= List of Asterales of South Africa =

List of flowering plants in the order Asterales recorded from South Africa

Asterales /æstəˈreɪliːz/ is an order of dicotyledonous flowering plants that includes the large family Asteraceae (or Compositae) known for composite flowers made of florets, and ten families related to the Asteraceae. The order has a cosmopolitan distribution, members are found throughout most of the world including desert and frigid zones, and includes mostly herbaceous species, although a small number of trees and shrubs are also present.

Asterales seem to have evolved from one common ancestor, and share characteristics on morphological and biochemical levels. Synapomorphies (a character that is shared by two or more groups through evolutionary development) include the presence in the plants of oligosaccharide inulin, a nutrient storage molecule used instead of starch; and unique stamen morphology. The stamens are usually found around the style, either aggregated densely or fused into a tube, probably an adaptation in association with the plunger (brush; or secondary) pollination that is common among the families of the order, wherein pollen is collected and stored on the length of the pistil.

The anthophytes are a grouping of plant taxa bearing flower-like reproductive structures. They were formerly thought to be a clade comprising plants bearing flower-like structures. The group contained the angiosperms - the extant flowering plants, such as roses and grasses - as well as the Gnetales and the extinct Bennettitales.

23,420 species of vascular plant have been recorded in South Africa, making it the sixth most species-rich country in the world and the most species-rich country on the African continent. Of these, 153 species are considered to be threatened. Nine biomes have been described in South Africa: Fynbos, Succulent Karoo, desert, Nama Karoo, grassland, savanna, Albany thickets, the Indian Ocean coastal belt, and forests.

The 2018 South African National Biodiversity Institute's National Biodiversity Assessment plant checklist lists 35,130 taxa in the phyla Anthocerotophyta (hornworts (6)), Anthophyta (flowering plants (33534)), Bryophyta (mosses (685)), Cycadophyta (cycads (42)), Lycopodiophyta (Lycophytes(45)), Marchantiophyta (liverworts (376)), Pinophyta (conifers (33)), and Pteridophyta (cryptogams (408)).

Five families are represented in the literature. Listed taxa include species, subspecies, varieties, and forms as recorded, some of which have subsequently been allocated to other taxa as synonyms, in which cases the accepted taxon is appended to the listing. Multiple entries under alternative names reflect taxonomic revision over time.

== Asteraceae ==
Family: Asteraceae, 329 genera have been recorded. Not all are necessarily currently accepted.

- Genus Acanthospermum:
- Genus Acanthotheca:
- Genus Achillea:
- Genus Achyrocline:
- Genus Acmella:
- Genus Adenachaena:
- Genus Adenanthellum:
- Genus Adenoglossa:
- Genus Adenostemma:
- Genus Afroaster:
- Genus Ageratina:
- Genus Ageratum:
- Genus Alatoseta:
- Genus Alciope:
- Genus Ambrosia:
- Genus Amellus:
- Genus Amphiglossa:
- Genus Anaglypha:
- Genus Anaxeton:
- Genus Anderbergia:
- Genus Anisochaeta:
- Genus Anisopappus:
- Genus Anisothrix:
- Genus Anthemis:
- Genus Antithrixia:
- Genus Aphelexis:
- Genus Arctotheca:
- Genus Arctotis:
- Genus Argyrocome:
- Genus Arnica:
- Genus Arrowsmithia:
- Genus Artemisia:
- Genus Artemisiopsis:
- Genus Ascaricida:
- Genus Aspilia:
- Genus Aster:
- Genus Athanasia:
- Genus Athrixia:
- Genus Atractylis:
- Genus Atrichantha:
- Genus Baccharis:
- Genus Baccharoides:
- Genus Berkheya:
- Genus Bertilia:
- Genus Bidens:
- Genus Blainvillea:
- Genus Blumea:
- Genus Bolandia:
- Genus Bothriocline:
- Genus Brachylaena:
- Genus Brachymeris:
- Genus Brachyrhynchos:
- Genus Bryomorphe:
- Genus Cacalia:
- Genus Cadiscus:
- Genus Calendula:
- Genus Callilepis:
- Genus Calostephane:
- Genus Calotesta:
- Genus Campuloclinium:
- Genus Candidea:
- Genus Capelio:
- Genus Caputia:
- Genus Carduus:
- Genus Carthamus:
- Genus Castalis:
- Genus Cenia:
- Genus Centaurea:
- Genus Centipeda:
- Genus Centrapalus:
- Genus Chondrilla:
- Genus Chromolaena:
- Genus Chrysanthellum:
- Genus Chrysanthemoides:
- Genus Chrysanthemum:
- Genus Chrysocoma:
- Genus Cineraria:
- Genus Cirsium:
- Genus Cnicus:
- Genus Comborhiza:
- Genus Conyza:
- Genus Corymbium:
- Genus Cosmos:
- Genus Cotula:
- Genus Crassocephalum:
- Genus Crassothonna:
- Genus Crepis:
- Genus Callumia:
- Genus Curio:
- Genus Cuspidia:
- Genus Cyanthillium:
- Genus Cymbopappus:
- Genus Cypselodontia:
- Genus Decaneurum:
- Genus Delairea:
- Genus Denekia:
- Genus Dicerothamnus:
- Genus Dichrocephala:
- Genus Dicoma:
- Genus Didelta:
- Genus Dimorphanthes:
- Genus Dimorphotheca:
- Genus Disparago:
- Genus Distephanus:
- Genus Dittrichia:
- Genus Doellia:
- Genus Dolichothrix:
- Genus Doria:
- Genus Doronicum:
- Genus Dymondia:
- Genus Eclipta:
- Genus Edmondia:
- Genus Elephantopus:
- Genus Elytropappus:
- Genus Emilia:
- Genus Enydra:
- Genus Erigeron:
- Genus Eriocephalus:
- Genus Erlangia:
- Genus Eschenbachia:
- Genus Ethulia:
- Genus Eumorphia:
- Genus Eupatorium:
- Genus Euryops:
- Genus Facelis:
- Genus Felicia:
- Genus Flaveria:
- Genus Foveolina:
- Genus Gaillardia:
- Genus Galeomma:
- Genus Galinsoga:
- Genus Gamochaeta:
- Genus Garuleum:
- Genus Gazania:
- Genus Geigeria:
- Genus Gerbera:
- Genus Gibbaria:
- Genus Glebionis:
- Genus Gnaphalium:
- Genus Gongrothamnus:
- Genus Gongyloglossa:
- Genus Gorteria:
- Genus Grangea:
- Genus Guizotia:
- Genus Gymnanthemum:
- Genus Gymnodiscus:
- Genus Gymnopentzia:
- Genus Gymnostephium:
- Genus Haplocarpha:
- Genus Hedypnois:
- Genus Helianthus:
- Genus Helichrysopsis:
- Genus Helichrysum:
- Genus Helminthotheca:
- Genus Hertia:
- Genus Heterolepis:
- Genus Heteromma:
- Genus Heterorhachis:
- Genus Hilliardia:
- Genus Hilliardiella:
- Genus Hippia:
- Genus Hirpicium:
- Genus Hoplophyllum:
- Genus Hydroidea:
- Genus Hymenolepis:
- Genus Hyoseris:
- Genus Hypericophyllum:
- Genus Hypochaeris:
- Genus Ifloga:
- Genus Inezia:
- Genus Inula:
- Genus Inulanthera:
- Genus Inuloides:
- Genus Iocaste:
- Genus Keringa:
- Genus Kleinia:
- Genus Klenzea:
- Genus Lachnospermum:
- Genus Lactuca:
- Genus Laevicarpa:
- Genus Laggera:
- Genus Lamprocephalus:
- Genus Langebergia:
- Genus Lapsana:
- Genus Lasiopogon:
- Genus Lasiopus:
- Genus Lasiospermum:
- Genus Launaea:
- Genus Lepidostephium:
- Genus Leptilon:
- Genus Leucanthemum:
- Genus Leucoptera:
- Genus Leysera:
- Genus Lidbeckia:
- Genus Linzia:
- Genus Litogyne:
- Genus Lopholaena:
- Genus Macledium:
- Genus Macowania:
- Genus Mairia:
- Genus Mantisalca:
- Genus Marasmodes:
- Genus Marsea:
- Genus Matricaria:
- Genus Melanthera:
- Genus Mesogramma:
- Genus Metalasia:
- Genus Microglossa:
- Genus Mikania:
- Genus Mikaniopsis:
- Genus Minurothamnus:
- Genus Monoculus:
- Genus Montanoa:
- Genus Monticapra:
- Genus Morysia:
- Genus Myrovernix:
- Genus Myxopappus:
- Genus Namibithamnus:
- Genus Nephrotheca:
- Genus Nestlera:
- Genus Nicolasia:
- Genus Nidorella:
- Genus Nolletia:
- Genus Norlindhia:
- Genus Oedera:
- Genus Oldenburgia:
- Genus Oligocarpus:
- Genus Oligoglossa:
- Genus Oligothrix:
- Genus Oncosiphon:
- Genus Oocephala:
- Genus Orbivestus:
- Genus Oreoleysera:
- Genus Oresbia:
- Genus Osmitopsis:
- Genus Osteospermum:
- Genus Othonna:
- Genus Oxylaena:
- Genus Parapolydora:
- Genus Parthenium:
- Genus Pechuel-loeschea:
- Genus Pegolettia:
- Genus Pentanema:
- Genus Pentatrichia:
- Genus Pentzia:
- Genus Perdicium:
- Genus Petalacte:
- Genus Peyrousea:
- Genus Phaenocoma:
- Genus Phaneroglossa:
- Genus Philyrophyllum:
- Genus Phymaspermum:
- Genus Picris:
- Genus Planea:
- Genus Platycarpha:
- Genus Platycarphella:
- Genus Plecostachys:
- Genus Plectreca:
- Genus Pluchea:
- Genus Poecilolepis:
- Genus Polyarrhena:
- Genus Polydora:
- Genus Printzia:
- Genus Pseudoconyza:
- Genus Pseudognaphalium:
- Genus Pseudopegolettia:
- Genus Psiadia:
- Genus Pteronia:
- Genus Pterothrix:
- Genus Pulicaria:
- Genus Relhania:
- Genus Rennera:
- Genus Rhynchopsidium:
- Genus Roldana:
- Genus Roodebergia:
- Genus Rosenia:
- Genus Schistostephium:
- Genus Schkuhria:
- Genus Senecio:
- Genus Seneciodes:
- Genus Seriphium:
- Genus Sigesbeckia:
- Genus Silybum:
- Genus Solanecio:
- Genus Solidago:
- Genus Soliva:
- Genus Sonchus:
- Genus Sphaeranthus:
- Genus Sphagneticola:
- Genus Spilanthes:
- Genus Staehelina:
- Genus Steirodiscus:
- Genus Stengelia:
- Genus Stilpnogyne:
- Genus Stoebe:
- Genus Stomatanthes:
- Genus Symphyotrichum:
- Genus Syncarpha:
- Genus Tagetes:
- Genus Tanacetum:
- Genus Taraxacum:
- Genus Tarchonanthus:
- Genus Tenrhynea:
- Genus Thaminophyllum:
- Genus Tithonia:
- Genus Tolpis:
- Genus Tragopogon:
- Genus Trichogyne:
- Genus Tridax:
- Genus Tripteris:
- Genus Troglophyton:
- Genus Urospermum:
- Genus Ursinia:
- Genus Vellereophyton:
- Genus Verbesina:
- Genus Vernonella:
- Genus Vernonia:
- Genus Vernoniastrum:
- Genus Vicoa:
- Genus Waitzia:
- Genus Webbia:
- Genus Wedelia:
- Genus Xanthium:
- Genus Xenismia:
- Genus Xeranthemum:
- Genus Youngia:
- Genus Zinnia:
- Genus Zoutpansbergia:
- Genus Zyrphelis:

== Campanulaceae ==
Family: Campanulaceae,

=== Campanula ===
Genus Campanula:

- Campanula cinerea L.f. accepted as Wahlenbergia cinerea (L.f.) Lammers, indigenous
- Campanula fasciculata L.f. accepted as Wahlenbergia desmantha Lammers, endemic
- Campanula sessiliflora L.f. accepted as Wahlenbergia subulata (L'Her.) Lammers var. subulata, indigenous
- Campanula tenella L.f. accepted as Wahlenbergia tenella (L.f.) Lammers var. tenella, indigenous
- Campanula unidentata L.f. accepted as Wahlenbergia unidentata (L.f.) Lammers, endemic

=== Craterocapsa ===
Genus Craterocapsa:

- Craterocapsa alfredica D.Y.Hong, endemic
- Craterocapsa congesta Hilliard & B.L.Burtt, indigenous
- Craterocapsa insizwae (Zahlbr.) Hilliard & B.L.Burtt, endemic
- Craterocapsa montana (A.DC.) Hilliard & B.L.Burtt, indigenous
- Craterocapsa tarsodes Hilliard & B.L.Burtt, indigenous

=== Lightfootia ===
Genus Lightfootia:

- Lightfootia adpressa (Thunb.) A.DC. accepted as Wahlenbergia adpressa (Thunb.) Sond. present
- Lightfootia albens Spreng. ex A.DC. accepted as Wahlenbergia albens (Spreng. ex A.DC.) Lammers, indigenous
- Lightfootia albicaulis Sond. accepted as Wahlenbergia albicaulis (Sond.) Lammers, endemic
- Lightfootia asparagoides Adamson, accepted as Wahlenbergia asparagoides (Adamson) Lammers, endemic
- Lightfootia axillaris Sond. accepted as Wahlenbergia axillaris (Sond.) Lammers, endemic
- Lightfootia brachiata Adamson, accepted as Wahlenbergia brachiata (Adamson) Lammers, endemic
- Lightfootia brachyphylla Adamson, accepted as Wahlenbergia brachyphylla (Adamson) Lammers, endemic
- Lightfootia calcarea Adamson, accepted as Wahlenbergia calcarea (Adamson) Lammers, endemic
- Lightfootia caledonica Sond. accepted as Wahlenbergia dieterlenii (E.Phillips) Lammers, indigenous
- Lightfootia capillaris H.Buek, accepted as Wahlenbergia thulinii Lammers, endemic
- Lightfootia cinerea (L.f.) Sond. accepted as Wahlenbergia cinerea (L.f.) Lammers, endemic
- Lightfootia cordata Adamson, accepted as Wahlenbergia cordata (Adamson) Lammers, endemic
- Lightfootia denticulata (Burch.) Sond. var. transvaalensis Adamson, accepted as Wahlenbergia denticulata (Burch.) A.DC. var. transvaalensis (Adamson) W.G.Welman, indigenous
- Lightfootia dieterlenii E.Phillips, accepted as Wahlenbergia dieterlenii (E.Phillips) Lammers, indigenous
- Lightfootia diffusa H.Buek, accepted as Wahlenbergia tenella (L.f.) Lammers, indigenous
- Lightfootia diffusa H.Buek var. palustris Adamson, accepted as Wahlenbergia tenella (L.f.) Lammers var. palustris (Adamson) W.G.Welman, endemic
- Lightfootia diffusa H.Buek var. stokoei Adamson, accepted as Wahlenbergia tenella (L.f.) Lammers var. stokoei (Adamson) W.G.Welman, endemic
- Lightfootia dinteri Engl. ex Dinter, accepted as Wahlenbergia denticulata (Burch.) A.DC. var. denticulata
- Lightfootia divaricata H.Buek, accepted as Wahlenbergia thunbergii (Schult.) B.Nord. var. thunbergii, indigenous
- Lightfootia divaricata H.Buek var. debilis (Sond.) Adamson, accepted as Wahlenbergia thunbergii (Schult.) B.Nord. var. debilis (Sond.) B.Nord. endemic
- Lightfootia divaricata H.Buek var. filifolia Adamson, accepted as Wahlenbergia thunbergii (Schult.) B.Nord. var. filifolia (Adamson) B.Nord. endemic
- Lightfootia effusa Adamson, accepted as Wahlenbergia effusa (Adamson) Lammers, endemic
- Lightfootia fasciculata (L.f.) A.DC. accepted as Wahlenbergia desmantha Lammers, endemic
- Lightfootia intermedia H.Buek, accepted as Wahlenbergia thunbergii (Schult.) B.Nord. var. thunbergii, indigenous
- Lightfootia juncea (H.Buek) Sond. accepted as Wahlenbergia juncea (H.Buek) Lammers, endemic
- Lightfootia laxiflora Sond. accepted as Wahlenbergia laxiflora (Sond.) Lammers, endemic
- Lightfootia loddigesii A.DC. accepted as Wahlenbergia tenerrima (H.Buek) Lammers, indigenous
- Lightfootia longifolia A.DC. accepted as Wahlenbergia longifolia (A.DC.) Lammers, endemic
- Lightfootia longifolia A.DC. var. corymbosa Adamson, accepted as Wahlenbergia longifolia (A.DC.) Lammers var. corymbosa (Adamson) W.G.Welman, endemic
- Lightfootia macrostachys A.DC. accepted as Wahlenbergia macrostachys (A.DC.) Lammers, endemic
- Lightfootia microphylla Adamson, accepted as Wahlenbergia microphylla (Adamson) Lammers, endemic
- Lightfootia multicaulis Adamson, accepted as Wahlenbergia adamsonii Lammers, endemic
- Lightfootia multiflora Adamson, accepted as Wahlenbergia polyantha Lammers, endemic
- Lightfootia namaquana Sond. accepted as Wahlenbergia sonderi Lammers, endemic
- Lightfootia nodosa H.Buek, accepted as Wahlenbergia nodosa (H.Buek) Lammers, endemic
- Lightfootia oppositifolia A.DC. accepted as Wahlenbergia thulinii Lammers, indigenous
- Lightfootia paniculata Sond. accepted as Wahlenbergia magaliesbergensis Lammers, endemic
- Lightfootia parvifolia (P.J.Bergius) Adamson, accepted as Wahlenbergia parvifolia (P.J.Bergius) Lammers, endemic
- Lightfootia pauciflora Adamson, accepted as Wahlenbergia oligantha Lammers, endemic
- Lightfootia planifolia Adamson, accepted as Wahlenbergia riversdalensis Lammers, endemic
- Lightfootia rigida Adamson, accepted as Wahlenbergia neorigida Lammers, endemic
- Lightfootia rubens H.Buek, accepted as Wahlenbergia rubens (H.Buek) Lammers, endemic
- Lightfootia rubens H.Buek var. brachyphylla Adamson, accepted as Wahlenbergia rubens (H.Buek) Lammers var. brachyphylla (Adamson) W.G.Welman, endemic
- Lightfootia rubioides Banks ex A.DC. accepted as Wahlenbergia rubioides (Banks ex A.DC.) Lammers, endemic
- Lightfootia rubioides Banks ex A.DC. var. stokoei Adamson, accepted as Wahlenbergia rubioides (Banks ex A.DC.) Lammers var. stokoei (Adamson) W.G.Welman, endemic
- Lightfootia sessiliflora (L.f.) Sond. accepted as Wahlenbergia subulata (L'Her.) Lammers var. subulata, indigenous
- Lightfootia spicata H.Buek, accepted as Wahlenbergia macrostachys (A.DC.) Lammers, indigenous
- Lightfootia squarrosa Adamson, accepted as Wahlenbergia levynsiae Lammers, endemic
- Lightfootia stricta Adamson, accepted as Wahlenbergia neostricta Lammers, endemic
- Lightfootia subulata L'Her. accepted as Wahlenbergia subulata (L'Her.) Lammers, endemic
- Lightfootia subulata L'Her. var. congesta Adamson, accepted as Wahlenbergia subulata (L'Her.) Lammers var. congesta (Adamson) W.G.Welman, endemic
- Lightfootia subulata L'Her. var. tenuifolia Adamson, accepted as Wahlenbergia subulata (L'Her.) Lammers var. tenuifolia (Adamson) W.G.Welman, endemic
- Lightfootia tenella (L.f.) A.DC. accepted as Wahlenbergia tenella (L.f.) Lammers var. tenella, indigenous
- Lightfootia tenella (L.f.) A.DC. var. fasciculata (L.f.) Sond. accepted as Wahlenbergia desmantha Lammers, endemic
- Lightfootia tenella (L.f.) A.DC. var. microphylla Sond. accepted as Wahlenbergia nodosa (H.Buek) Lammers, indigenous
- Lightfootia tenella (L.f.) A.DC. var. tenerrima (H.Buek) Sond. accepted as Wahlenbergia tenerrima (H.Buek) Lammers var. tenerrima, indigenous
- Lightfootia tenella Lodd. accepted as Wahlenbergia tenerrima (H.Buek) Lammers, indigenous
- Lightfootia tenella Lodd. var. montana Adamson, accepted as Wahlenbergia tenerrima (H.Buek) Lammers var. montana (Adamson) W.G.Welman, endemic
- Lightfootia tenerrima H.Buek, accepted as Wahlenbergia tenerrima (H.Buek) Lammers var. tenerrima, endemic
- Lightfootia tenuis Adamson, accepted as Wahlenbergia pyrophila Lammers, endemic
- Lightfootia thunbergiana H.Buek, accepted as Wahlenbergia thunbergiana (H.Buek) Lammers, present
- Lightfootia uitenhagensis H.Buek, accepted as Wahlenbergia thunbergii (Schult.) B.Nord. var. thunbergii, indigenous
- Lightfootia umbellata Adamson, accepted as Wahlenbergia umbellata (Adamson) Lammers, endemic
- Lightfootia unidentata (L.f.) A.DC. accepted as Wahlenbergia unidentata (L.f.) Lammers, endemic

=== Merciera ===
Genus Merciera:

- Merciera azurea Schltr. endemic
- Merciera brevifolia A.DC. endemic
- Merciera eckloniana H.Buek, endemic
- Merciera leptoloba A.DC. endemic
- Merciera tenuifolia (L.f.) A.DC. endemic
- Merciera tenuifolia (L.f.) A.DC. var. azurea (Schltr.) Adamson, accepted as Merciera azurea Schltr. present
- Merciera tenuifolia (L.f.) A.DC. var. candolleana Sond. accepted as Merciera tenuifolia (L.f.) A.DC. present
- Merciera tetraloba Cupido, endemic
- Merciera vaginata Adamson, accepted as Carpacoce heteromorpha (H.Buek) L.Bolus, present

=== Microcodon ===
Genus Microcodon:

- Microcodon glomeratus A.DC. endemic
- Microcodon hispidulus (Thunb.) Sond. accepted as Wahlenbergia hispidula (Thunb.) A.DC.
- Microcodon linearis (L.f.) H.Buek, endemic
- Microcodon sparsiflorus A.DC. endemic

=== Prismatocarpus ===
Genus Prismatocarpus:

- Prismatocarpus alpinus (Bond) Adamson, endemic
- Prismatocarpus altiflorus L'Her. endemic
- Prismatocarpus brevilobus A.DC. endemic
- Prismatocarpus campanuloides (L.f.) Sond. indigenous
- Prismatocarpus campanuloides (L.f.) Sond. var. campanuloides, endemic
- Prismatocarpus campanuloides (L.f.) Sond. var. dentatus Adamson, endemic
- Prismatocarpus candolleanus Cham. endemic
- Prismatocarpus cliffortioides Adamson, endemic
- Prismatocarpus cordifolius Adamson, endemic
- Prismatocarpus crispus L'Her. endemic
- Prismatocarpus debilis Adamson, indigenous
- Prismatocarpus debilis Adamson var. debilis, endemic
- Prismatocarpus debilis Adamson var. elongatus Adamson, endemic
- Prismatocarpus decurrens Adamson, endemic
- Prismatocarpus diffusus (L.f.) A.DC. endemic
- Prismatocarpus fastigiatus C.Presl ex A.DC. endemic
- Prismatocarpus fruticosus L'Her. endemic
- Prismatocarpus hildebrandtii Vatke, endemic
- Prismatocarpus hispidus Adamson, endemic
- Prismatocarpus implicatus Adamson, endemic
- Prismatocarpus junceus H.Buek, accepted as Wahlenbergia juncea (H.Buek) Lammers
- Prismatocarpus lasiophyllus Adamson, endemic
- Prismatocarpus lycioides Adamson, endemic
- Prismatocarpus lycopodioides A.DC. indigenous
- Prismatocarpus lycopodioides A.DC. var. hispidus Adamson, endemic
- Prismatocarpus lycopodioides A.DC. var. lycopodioides, endemic
- Prismatocarpus nitidus L'Her. indigenous
- Prismatocarpus nitidus L'Her. var. nitidus, endemic
- Prismatocarpus nitidus L'Her. var. ovatus Adamson, accepted as Prismatocarpus debilis Adamson var. debilis, present
- Prismatocarpus pauciflorus Adamson, endemic
- Prismatocarpus pedunculatus (P.J.Bergius) A.DC. endemic
- Prismatocarpus pilosus Adamson, endemic
- Prismatocarpus rogersii Fourc. endemic
- Prismatocarpus schlechteri Adamson, endemic
- Prismatocarpus sessilis Eckl. ex A.DC. indigenous
- Prismatocarpus sessilis Eckl. ex A.DC. var. macrocarpus Adamson, endemic
- Prismatocarpus sessilis Eckl. ex A.DC. var. sessilis, endemic
- Prismatocarpus spinosus Adamson, endemic
- Prismatocarpus tenellus Oliv. endemic
- Prismatocarpus tenerrimus H.Buek, endemic
- Prismatocarpus virgatus Fourc. endemic

=== Rhigiophyllum ===
Genus Rhigiophyllum:

- Rhigiophyllum squarrosum Hochst. endemic

=== Roella ===
Genus Roella:

- Roella amplexicaulis Wolley-Dod, endemic
- Roella arenaria Schltr. endemic
- Roella bryoides H.Buek, endemic
- Roella ciliata L. endemic
- Roella compacta Schltr. endemic
- Roella cuspidata Adamson var. cuspidata, accepted as Roella compacta Schltr. present
- Roella cuspidata Adamson var. hispida Adamson, accepted as Roella compacta Schltr. present
- Roella decurrens L'Her. endemic
- Roella divina Cupido, endemic
- Roella dregeana A.DC. indigenous
- Roella dregeana A.DC. var. dregeana, endemic
- Roella dregeana A.DC. var. nitida (Schltr.) Adamson, endemic
- Roella dunantii A.DC. endemic
- Roella glomerata A.DC. endemic
- Roella goodiana Adamson, endemic
- Roella incurva A.DC. endemic
- Roella incurva A.DC. var. rigida Adamson, accepted as Roella prostrata E.Mey. ex A.DC. present
- Roella latiloba A.DC. endemic
- Roella lightfootioides Schltr. accepted as Roella spicata L.f. var. spicata, present
- Roella maculata Adamson, endemic
- Roella muscosa L.f. endemic
- Roella prostrata E.Mey. ex A.DC. endemic
- Roella psammophila Schltr. accepted as Roella dregeana A.DC. var. dregeana, present
- Roella recurvata A.DC. endemic
- Roella reticulata L. accepted as Cullumia reticulata (L.) Greuter, M.V.Agab. & Wagenitz, indigenous
- Roella rhodantha Adamson, accepted as Roella incurva A.DC. present
- Roella secunda H.Buek, endemic
- Roella spicata L.f. indigenous
- Roella spicata L.f. var. burchellii Adamson, endemic
- Roella spicata L.f. var. spicata, endemic
- Roella squarrosa P.J.Bergius, endemic
- Roella triflora (R.D.Good) Adamson, endemic
- Roella uncinata Cupido, endemic

=== Siphocodon ===
Genus Siphocodon:

- Siphocodon debilis Schltr. endemic
- Siphocodon spartioides Turcz. endemic

=== Theilera ===
Genus Theilera:

- Theilera capensis D.Y.Hong, accepted as Theilera robusta (A.DC.) Cupido, indigenous
- Theilera guthriei (L.Bolus) E.Phillips, endemic
- Theilera robusta (A.DC.) Cupido, endemic

=== Trachelium ===
Genus Trachelium:

- Trachelium lanceolatum Guss. not indigenous, cultivated

=== Treichelia ===
Genus Treichelia:

- Treichelia dodii Cupido, indigenous
- Treichelia longibracteata (H.Buek ex Eckl. & Zeyh.) Vatke, endemic

=== Wahlenbergia ===
Genus Wahlenbergia:

- Wahlenbergia abyssinica (Hochst. ex A.Rich.) Thulin, indigenous
- Wahlenbergia abyssinica (Hochst. ex A.Rich.) Thulin subsp. abyssinica, indigenous
- Wahlenbergia acaulis E.Mey. endemic
- Wahlenbergia acicularis Brehmer, endemic
- Wahlenbergia acuminata Brehmer, endemic
- Wahlenbergia adamsonii Lammers, endemic
- Wahlenbergia adpressa (Thunb.) Sond. endemic
- Wahlenbergia albens (Spreng. ex A.DC.) Lammers, indigenous
- Wahlenbergia albicaulis (Sond.) Lammers, endemic
- Wahlenbergia androsacea A.DC. indigenous
- Wahlenbergia annularis A.DC. indigenous
- Wahlenbergia annuliformis Brehmer, accepted as Wahlenbergia androsacea A.DC. endemic
- Wahlenbergia appressifolia Hilliard & B.L.Burtt, indigenous
- Wahlenbergia asparagoides (Adamson) Lammers, endemic
- Wahlenbergia asperifolia Brehmer, endemic
- Wahlenbergia axillaris (Sond.) Lammers, endemic
- Wahlenbergia banksiana A.DC. indigenous
- Wahlenbergia bolusiana Schltr. & Brehmer, endemic
- Wahlenbergia bowkerae Sond. endemic
- Wahlenbergia brachiata (Adamson) Lammers, endemic
- Wahlenbergia brachycarpa Schltr. endemic
- Wahlenbergia brachyphylla (Adamson) Lammers, endemic
- Wahlenbergia brehmeri Lammers, endemic
- Wahlenbergia brevisquamifolia Brehmer, endemic
- Wahlenbergia buseriana Schltr. & Brehmer, endemic
- Wahlenbergia calcarea (Adamson) Lammers, endemic
- Wahlenbergia campanuloides (Delile) Vatke, indigenous
- Wahlenbergia capensis (L.) A.DC. endemic
- Wahlenbergia capillacea (L.f.) A.DC. indigenous
- Wahlenbergia capillacea (L.f.) A.DC. subsp. capillacea, indigenous
- Wahlenbergia capillaris (H.Buek) Lammers, accepted as Wahlenbergia thulinii Lammers, endemic
- Wahlenbergia capillata Brehmer, endemic
- Wahlenbergia capillifolia E.Mey. ex Brehmer, endemic
- Wahlenbergia cernua (Thunb.) A.DC. endemic
- Wahlenbergia ciliolata A.DC. accepted as Wahlenbergia cernua (Thunb.) A.DC. present
- Wahlenbergia cinerea (L.f.) Lammers, endemic
- Wahlenbergia clavata Brehmer, endemic
- Wahlenbergia clavatula Brehmer, endemic
- Wahlenbergia compacta Brehmer, endemic
- Wahlenbergia congestifolia Brehmer, indigenous
- Wahlenbergia constricta Brehmer, endemic
- Wahlenbergia cooperi Brehmer, indigenous
- Wahlenbergia cordata (Adamson) Lammers, endemic
- Wahlenbergia costata A.DC. endemic
- Wahlenbergia cuspidata Brehmer, endemic
- Wahlenbergia debilis H.Buek, endemic
- Wahlenbergia decipiens A.DC. endemic
- Wahlenbergia dentata Brehmer, endemic
- Wahlenbergia denticulata (Burch.) A.DC. indigenous
- Wahlenbergia denticulata (Burch.) A.DC. var. denticulata, indigenous
- Wahlenbergia denticulata (Burch.) A.DC. var. transvaalensis (Adamson) W.G.Welman, endemic
- Wahlenbergia denudata A.DC. endemic
- Wahlenbergia depressa J.M.Wood & M.S.Evans, indigenous
- Wahlenbergia desmantha Lammers, endemic
- Wahlenbergia dichotoma A.DC. endemic
- Wahlenbergia dieterlenii (E.Phillips) Lammers, indigenous
- Wahlenbergia dilatata Brehmer, endemic
- Wahlenbergia distincta Brehmer, endemic
- Wahlenbergia divergens A.DC. endemic
- Wahlenbergia doleritica Hilliard & B.L.Burtt, endemic
- Wahlenbergia dunantii A.DC. endemic
- Wahlenbergia ecklonii H.Buek, endemic
- Wahlenbergia effusa (Adamson) Lammers, endemic
- Wahlenbergia epacridea Sond. indigenous
- Wahlenbergia exilis A.DC. endemic
- Wahlenbergia fasciculata Brehmer, indigenous
- Wahlenbergia filipes Brehmer, endemic
- Wahlenbergia fistulosa Brehmer, endemic
- Wahlenbergia floribunda Schltr. & Brehmer, endemic
- Wahlenbergia fruticosa Brehmer, endemic
- Wahlenbergia galpiniae Schltr. endemic
- Wahlenbergia glandulifera Brehmer, endemic
- Wahlenbergia glandulosa Brehmer, accepted as Wahlenbergia androsacea A.DC. present
- Wahlenbergia gracilis E.Mey. endemic
- Wahlenbergia grandiflora Brehmer, indigenous
- Wahlenbergia hispidula (Thunb.) A.DC. endemic
- Wahlenbergia huttonii (Sond.) Thulin, indigenous
- Wahlenbergia ingrata A.DC. endemic
- Wahlenbergia inhambanensis Klotzsch, accepted as Wahlenbergia androsacea A.DC. present
- Wahlenbergia juncea (H.Buek) Lammers, endemic
- Wahlenbergia kowiensis R.A.Dyer, endemic
- Wahlenbergia krebsii Cham. indigenous
- Wahlenbergia krebsii Cham. subsp. krebsii, indigenous
- Wahlenbergia lasiocarpa Schltr. & Brehmer, endemic
- Wahlenbergia laxiflora (Sond.) Lammers, endemic
- Wahlenbergia levynsiae Lammers, endemic
- Wahlenbergia littoralis Schltr. & Brehmer, accepted as Wahlenbergia orae Lammers, present
- Wahlenbergia lobata Brehmer, endemic
- Wahlenbergia lobulata Brehmer, indigenous
- Wahlenbergia longifolia (A.DC.) Lammers, endemic
- Wahlenbergia longifolia (A.DC.) Lammers var. corymbosa (Adamson) W.G.Welman, endemic
- Wahlenbergia longifolia (A.DC.) Lammers var. longifolia, endemic
- Wahlenbergia longisepala Brehmer, endemic
- Wahlenbergia longisquamifolia Brehmer, endemic
- Wahlenbergia lycopodioides Schltr. & Brehmer, indigenous
- Wahlenbergia macra Schltr. & Brehmer, accepted as Wahlenbergia ecklonii H.Buek, present
- Wahlenbergia macrostachys (A.DC.) Lammers, endemic
- Wahlenbergia maculata Brehmer, endemic
- Wahlenbergia madagascariensis A.DC. indigenous
- Wahlenbergia magaliesbergensis Lammers, endemic
- Wahlenbergia massonii A.DC. endemic
- Wahlenbergia melanops Goldblatt & J.C.Manning, endemic
- Wahlenbergia meyeri A.DC. endemic
- Wahlenbergia microphylla (Adamson) Lammers, endemic
- Wahlenbergia minuta Brehmer, endemic
- Wahlenbergia mollis Brehmer, endemic
- Wahlenbergia namaquana Sond. endemic
- Wahlenbergia nana Brehmer, indigenous
- Wahlenbergia neorigida Lammers, endemic
- Wahlenbergia neostricta Lammers, endemic
- Wahlenbergia nodosa (H.Buek) Lammers, endemic
- Wahlenbergia obovata Brehmer, endemic
- Wahlenbergia oligantha Lammers, endemic
- Wahlenbergia oligotricha Schltr. & Brehmer, endemic
- Wahlenbergia oocarpa Sond. endemic
- Wahlenbergia orae Lammers, endemic
- Wahlenbergia oxyphylla A.DC. indigenous
- Wahlenbergia pallidiflora Hilliard & B.L.Burtt, endemic
- Wahlenbergia paniculata (Thunb.) A.DC. indigenous
- Wahlenbergia parvifolia (P.J.Bergius) Lammers, endemic
- Wahlenbergia patula A.DC. indigenous
- Wahlenbergia paucidentata Schinz, indigenous
- Wahlenbergia pauciflora A.DC. endemic
- Wahlenbergia pilosa H.Buek [1], endemic
- Wahlenbergia pinifolia N.E.Br. endemic
- Wahlenbergia pinnata Compton, indigenous
- Wahlenbergia polyantha Lammers, endemic
- Wahlenbergia polychotoma Brehmer, accepted as Wahlenbergia undulata (L.f.) A.DC. present
- Wahlenbergia polyclada A.DC. endemic
- Wahlenbergia polytrichifolia Schltr. indigenous
- Wahlenbergia polytrichifolia Schltr. subsp. dracomontana Hilliard & B.L.Burtt, indigenous
- Wahlenbergia polytrichifolia Schltr. subsp. polytrichifolia, endemic
- Wahlenbergia procumbens (Thunb.) A.DC. endemic
- Wahlenbergia prostrata A.DC. indigenous
- Wahlenbergia psammophila Schltr. indigenous
- Wahlenbergia pseudoandrosacea Brehmer, endemic
- Wahlenbergia pseudoinhambanensis Brehmer, endemic
- Wahlenbergia pseudonudicaulis Brehmer, endemic
- Wahlenbergia pulvillus-gigantis Hilliard & B.L.Burtt, indigenous
- Wahlenbergia pyrophila Lammers, endemic
- Wahlenbergia ramifera Brehmer, endemic
- Wahlenbergia ramulosa E.Mey. accepted as Wahlenbergia debilis H.Buek, endemic
- Wahlenbergia rara Schltr. & Brehmer, endemic
- Wahlenbergia rhytidosperma Thulin, endemic
- Wahlenbergia rigida Bernh. accepted as Theilera robusta (A.DC.) Cupido, present
- Wahlenbergia riversdalensis Lammers, endemic
- Wahlenbergia rivularis Diels, endemic
- Wahlenbergia robusta (A.DC.) Sond. accepted as Theilera robusta (A.DC.) Cupido, endemic
- Wahlenbergia roelliflora Schltr. & Brehmer, endemic
- Wahlenbergia rotundifolia Brehmer, accepted as Wahlenbergia brehmeri Lammers, present
- Wahlenbergia rubens (H.Buek) Lammers, endemic
- Wahlenbergia rubens (H.Buek) Lammers var. brachyphylla (Adamson) W.G.Welman, endemic
- Wahlenbergia rubens (H.Buek) Lammers var. rubens, endemic
- Wahlenbergia rubioides (Banks ex A.DC.) Lammers, endemic
- Wahlenbergia rubioides (Banks ex A.DC.) Lammers var. rubioides, endemic
- Wahlenbergia rubioides (Banks ex A.DC.) Lammers var. stokoei (Adamson) W.G.Welman, endemic
- Wahlenbergia saxifragoides Brehmer, endemic
- Wahlenbergia schistacea Brehmer, endemic
- Wahlenbergia schlechteri Brehmer, endemic
- Wahlenbergia scopella Brehmer, endemic
- Wahlenbergia serpentina Brehmer, endemic
- Wahlenbergia sessiliflora Brehmer, endemic
- Wahlenbergia sonderi Lammers, endemic
- Wahlenbergia sphaerica Brehmer, endemic
- Wahlenbergia squamifolia Brehmer, indigenous
- Wahlenbergia squarrosa Brehmer, endemic
- Wahlenbergia stellarioides Cham. & Schltdl. endemic
- Wahlenbergia subfusiformis Brehmer, endemic
- Wahlenbergia subpilosa Brehmer, endemic
- Wahlenbergia subrosulata Brehmer, indigenous
- Wahlenbergia subtilis Brehmer, endemic
- Wahlenbergia subulata (L'Her.) Lammers, endemic
- Wahlenbergia subulata (L'Her.) Lammers var. congesta (Adamson) W.G.Welman, endemic
- Wahlenbergia subulata (L'Her.) Lammers var. subulata, endemic
- Wahlenbergia subulata (L'Her.) Lammers var. tenuifolia (Adamson) W.G.Welman, endemic
- Wahlenbergia subumbellata Markgr. indigenous
- Wahlenbergia suffruticosa Cupido, indigenous
- Wahlenbergia swellendamensis H.Buek, accepted as Wahlenbergia ecklonii H.Buek, present
- Wahlenbergia tenella (L.f.) Lammers, endemic
- Wahlenbergia tenella (L.f.) Lammers var. palustris (Adamson) W.G.Welman, endemic
- Wahlenbergia tenella (L.f.) Lammers var. stokoei (Adamson) W.G.Welman, endemic
- Wahlenbergia tenella (L.f.) Lammers var. tenella, endemic
- Wahlenbergia tenerrima (H.Buek) Lammers, endemic
- Wahlenbergia tenerrima (H.Buek) Lammers var. montana (Adamson) W.G.Welman, endemic
- Wahlenbergia tenerrima (H.Buek) Lammers var. tenerrima, endemic
- Wahlenbergia tenuis A.DC. indigenous
- Wahlenbergia tetramera Thulin, endemic
- Wahlenbergia thulinii Lammers, endemic
- Wahlenbergia thunbergiana (H.Buek) Lammers, indigenous
- Wahlenbergia thunbergii (Schult.) B.Nord. indigenous
- Wahlenbergia thunbergii (Schult.) B.Nord. var. debilis (Sond.) B.Nord. endemic
- Wahlenbergia thunbergii (Schult.) B.Nord. var. filifolia (Adamson) B.Nord. endemic
- Wahlenbergia thunbergii (Schult.) B.Nord. var. thunbergii, endemic
- Wahlenbergia tomentosula Brehmer, endemic
- Wahlenbergia tortilis Brehmer, endemic
- Wahlenbergia transvaalensis Brehmer, endemic
- Wahlenbergia tumida Brehmer, endemic
- Wahlenbergia uitenhagensis (H.Buek) Lammers, accepted as Wahlenbergia thunbergii (Schult.) B.Nord. var. thunbergii, endemic
- Wahlenbergia uitenhagensis (H.Buek) Lammers var. debilis (Sond.) W.G.Welman, accepted as Wahlenbergia thunbergii (Schult.) B.Nord. var. debilis (Sond.) B.Nord. endemic
- Wahlenbergia uitenhagensis (H.Buek) Lammers var. filifolia (Adamson) W.G.Welman, accepted as Wahlenbergia thunbergii (Schult.) B.Nord. var. filifolia (Adamson) B.Nord. endemic
- Wahlenbergia umbellata (Adamson) Lammers, endemic
- Wahlenbergia undulata (L.f.) A.DC. indigenous
- Wahlenbergia unidentata (L.f.) Lammers, endemic
- Wahlenbergia virgata Engl. indigenous
- Wahlenbergia virgulta Brehmer, endemic
- Wahlenbergia wyleyana Sond. endemic

=== Goodeniaceae ===
Family: Goodeniaceae,

Genus Scaevola:

- Scaevola plumieri (L.) Vahl, indigenous
- Scaevola sericea Vahl, indigenous

== Lobeliaceae ==
Family: Lobeliaceae,

=== Cyphia ===
Genus Cyphia:

- Cyphia alba N.E.Br. indigenous
- Cyphia alicedalensis E.Wimm. endemic
- Cyphia angustifolia C.Presl ex Eckl. & Zeyh. endemic
- Cyphia angustiloba C.Presl ex Eckl. & Zeyh. endemic
- Cyphia aspergilloides E.Wimm. indigenous
  - Cyphia aspergilloides E.Wimm. var. aspergilloides, endemic
  - Cyphia aspergilloides E.Wimm. var. brevipes E.Wimm. endemic
- Cyphia assimilis Sond. endemic
  - Cyphia assimilis Sond. var. latifolia E.Phillips, accepted as Cyphia phillipsii E.Wimm. present
- Cyphia basiloba E.Wimm. endemic
- Cyphia belfastica E.Wimm. endemic
- Cyphia bolusii E.Phillips, indigenous
- Cyphia bulbosa (L.) P.J.Bergius, indigenous
  - Cyphia bulbosa (L.) P.J.Bergius var. acocksii E.Wimm. endemic
  - Cyphia bulbosa (L.) P.J.Bergius var. bulbosa, endemic
  - Cyphia bulbosa (L.) P.J.Bergius var. hafstroemii E.Wimm. endemic
  - Cyphia bulbosa (L.) P.J.Bergius var. leiandra E.Wimm. endemic
  - Cyphia bulbosa (L.) P.J.Bergius var. orientalis E.Phillips, accepted as Cyphia linarioides C.Presl ex Eckl. & Zeyh. present
- Cyphia campestris Eckl. & Zeyh. ex C.Presl, indigenous
  - Cyphia campestris Eckl. & Zeyh. ex C.Presl var. campestris, endemic
  - Cyphia campestris Eckl. & Zeyh. ex C.Presl var. nudiuscula E.Wimm. endemic
- Cyphia comptonii Bond, endemic
- Cyphia corylifolia Harv. endemic
- Cyphia crenata (Thunb.) C.Presl, indigenous
  - Cyphia crenata (Thunb.) C.Presl var. angustifolia E.Wimm. endemic
  - Cyphia crenata (Thunb.) C.Presl var. crenata, endemic
- Cyphia deltoidea E.Wimm. endemic
- Cyphia dentariifolia C.Presl, indigenous
  - Cyphia dentariifolia C.Presl var. dentariifolia, indigenous
  - Cyphia dentariifolia C.Presl var. luttigii E.Wimm. endemic
  - Cyphia dentariifolia C.Presl var. psilandra E.Wimm. endemic
- Cyphia dentata E.Wimm. endemic
- Cyphia digitata (Thunb.) Willd. indigenous
  - Cyphia digitata (Thunb.) Willd. subsp. digitata, endemic
  - Cyphia digitata (Thunb.) Willd. subsp. gracilis E.Wimm. endemic
- Cyphia eckloniana C.Presl ex Eckl. & Zeyh. endemic
- Cyphia elata Harv. indigenous
  - Cyphia elata Harv. var. elata, indigenous
  - Cyphia elata Harv. var. gerrardii (Harv.) E.Wimm. indigenous
  - Cyphia elata Harv. var. glabra Harv. endemic
  - Cyphia elata Harv. var. globularis E.Wimm. endemic
  - Cyphia elata Harv. var. oblongifolia (Sond. & Harv.) E.Phillips, accepted as Cyphia oblongifolia Sond. & Harv. present
- Cyphia galpinii E.Wimm. endemic
- Cyphia georgica E.Wimm. endemic
- Cyphia glabra E.Wimm. endemic
- Cyphia heterophylla C.Presl ex Eckl. & Zeyh. endemic
- Cyphia incisa (Thunb.) Willd. indigenous
  - Cyphia incisa (Thunb.) Willd. var. bracteata E.Phillips, endemic
  - Cyphia incisa (Thunb.) Willd. var. cardamines (Thunb.) E.Phillips, endemic
  - Cyphia incisa (Thunb.) Willd. var. incisa, endemic
  - Cyphia incisa (Thunb.) Willd. var. lyrata E.Wimm. endemic
  - Cyphia incisa (Thunb.) Willd. var. sinuata E.Wimm. endemic
- Cyphia latipetala C.Presl, endemic
- Cyphia linarioides C.Presl ex Eckl. & Zeyh. endemic
- Cyphia longiflora Schltr. endemic
- Cyphia longifolia N.E.Br. endemic
  - Cyphia longifolia N.E.Br. var. baurii E.Phillips, accepted as Cyphia longifolia N.E.Br. present
- Cyphia longilobata E.Phillips, endemic
- Cyphia longipedicellata E.Wimm. endemic
- Cyphia longipetala C.Presl, endemic
- Cyphia maculosa E.Phillips, endemic
- Cyphia natalensis E.Phillips, endemic
- Cyphia oblongifolia Sond. & Harv. indigenous
- Cyphia oligotricha Schltr. endemic
- Cyphia persicifolia C.Presl, endemic
- Cyphia phillipsii E.Wimm. endemic
- Cyphia phyteuma (L.) Willd. indigenous
  - Cyphia phyteuma (L.) Willd. var. ciliata E.Wimm. endemic
  - Cyphia phyteuma (L.) Willd. var. grandidentata E.Wimm. endemic
  - Cyphia phyteuma (L.) Willd. var. phyteuma, endemic
- Cyphia polydactyla C.Presl, endemic
- Cyphia psilostemon E.Wimm. endemic
- Cyphia ramosa E.Wimm. indigenous
- Cyphia ranunculifolia E.Wimm. endemic
- Cyphia revoluta E.Wimm. endemic
- Cyphia rogersii S.Moore, indigenous
  - Cyphia rogersii S.Moore subsp. rogersii, indigenous
  - Cyphia rogersii S.Moore subsp. winteri E.Wimm. endemic
- Cyphia salteri E.Wimm. endemic
- Cyphia schlechteri E.Phillips, endemic
- Cyphia smutsii E.Wimm. endemic
- Cyphia stenodonta E.Wimm. endemic
- Cyphia stenopetala Diels, indigenous
- Cyphia stenophylla E.Wimm. indigenous
- Cyphia subtubulata E.Wimm. endemic
- Cyphia sylvatica Eckl. indigenous
  - Cyphia sylvatica Eckl. var. graminea E.Wimm. endemic
  - Cyphia sylvatica Eckl. var. salicifolia (C.Presl ex Eckl. & Zeyh.) E.Wimm. endemic
  - Cyphia sylvatica Eckl. var. sylvatica, endemic
- Cyphia tenera Diels, endemic
- Cyphia tortilis N.E.Br. endemic
- Cyphia transvaalensis E.Phillips, endemic
- Cyphia tricuspis E.Wimm. endemic
- Cyphia triphylla E.Phillips, indigenous
- Cyphia tysonii E.Phillips, endemic
- Cyphia undulata Eckl. endemic
- Cyphia volubilis (Burm.f.) Willd. indigenous
  - Cyphia volubilis (Burm.f.) Willd. var. banksiana E.Wimm. endemic
  - Cyphia volubilis (Burm.f.) Willd. var. intermedia E.Wimm. accepted as Cyphia longipetala C.Presl, present
  - Cyphia volubilis (Burm.f.) Willd. var. latipetala (C.Presl ex Eckl. & Zeyh.) E.Wimm. accepted as Cyphia latipetala C.Presl, present
  - Cyphia volubilis (Burm.f.) Willd. var. longipes E.Wimm. accepted as Cyphia angustiloba C.Presl ex Eckl. & Zeyh. present
  - Cyphia volubilis (Burm.f.) Willd. var. volubilis, endemic
- Cyphia zeyheriana C.Presl ex Eckl. & Zeyh. endemic

=== Grammatotheca ===
Genus Grammatotheca:

- Grammatotheca bergiana (Cham.) C.Presl, indigenous
  - Grammatotheca bergiana (Cham.) C.Presl var. bergiana, endemic
  - Grammatotheca bergiana (Cham.) C.Presl var. ekloniana (C.Presl) E.Wimm. endemic
  - Grammatotheca bergiana (Cham.) C.Presl var. foliosa E.Wimm. endemic
  - Grammatotheca bergiana (Cham.) C.Presl var. pedunculata E.Wimm. endemic

=== Laurentia ===
Genus Laurentia:

- Laurentia arabidea (C.Presl) A.DC. accepted as Wimmerella arabidea (C.Presl) Serra, M.B.Crespo & Lammers, present
- Laurentia bifida (Thunb.) Sond. accepted as Wimmerella bifida (Thunb.) Serra, M.B.Crespo & Lammers, present
- Laurentia frontidentata E.Wimm. accepted as Wimmerella frontidentata (E.Wimm.) Serra, M.B.Crespo & Lammers, present
- Laurentia giftbergensis (E.Phillips) E.Wimm. accepted as Wimmerella bifida (Thunb.) Serra, M.B.Crespo & Lammers, present
- Laurentia hederacea Sond. accepted as Wimmerella hederacea (Sond.) Serra, M.B.Crespo & Lammers, present
- Laurentia hedyotidea Schltr. accepted as Wimmerella hedyotidea (Schltr.) Serra, M.B.Crespo & Lammers, present
- Laurentia longitubus E.Wimm. accepted as Wimmerella longitubus (E.Wimm.) Serra, M.B.Crespo & Lammers, present
- Laurentia mariae E.Wimm. accepted as Wimmerella mariae (E.Wimm.) Serra, M.B.Crespo & Lammers, present
- Laurentia pygmaea (Thunb.) Sond. var. pygmaea, accepted as Wimmerella pygmaea (Thunb.) Serra, M.B.Crespo & Lammers, present
- Laurentia secunda (L.f.) Kuntze, accepted as Wimmerella secunda (L.f.) Serra, M.B.Crespo & Lammers, present

=== Lobelia ===
Genus Lobelia:

- Lobelia acutangula (C.Presl) A.DC. accepted as Lobelia flaccida (C.Presl) A.DC. subsp. flaccida, present
- Lobelia anceps L.f. endemic
- Lobelia angolensis Engl. & Diels, accepted as Lobelia sonderiana (Kuntze) Lammers, present
- Lobelia aquaemontis E.Wimm. endemic
- Lobelia ardisiandroides Schltr. endemic
- Lobelia barkerae E.Wimm. endemic
- Lobelia bicolor Sims, accepted as Lobelia erinus L. present
- Lobelia boivinii Sond. endemic
  - Lobelia caerulea Hook. var. caerulea, accepted as Lobelia tomentosa L.f. present
  - Lobelia caerulea Hook. var. macularis (C.Presl) E.Wimm. accepted as Lobelia tomentosa L.f. present
- Lobelia capensis E.Wimm. accepted as Lobelia limosa (Adamson) E.Wimm. present
- Lobelia capillifolia (C.Presl) A.DC. endemic
- Lobelia chamaedryfolia (C.Presl) A.DC. endemic
- Lobelia chamaepitys Lam. indigenous
  - Lobelia chamaepitys Lam. var. ceratophylla (C.Presl) E.Wimm. endemic
  - Lobelia chamaepitys Lam. var. chamaepitys, endemic
- Lobelia chinensis Lour. not indigenous
- Lobelia cinerea Thunb. accepted as Wahlenbergia albicaulis (Sond.) Lammers, indigenous
- Lobelia cochlearifolia Diels, endemic
- Lobelia comosa L. indigenous
  - Lobelia comosa L. var. comosa, endemic
  - Lobelia comosa L. var. foliosa E.Wimm. endemic
  - Lobelia comosa L. var. microdon (C.Presl) E.Wimm. endemic
  - Lobelia comosa L. var. secundata (Sond.) E.Wimm. endemic
- Lobelia comptonii E.Wimm. endemic
- Lobelia corniculata Thulin, indigenous
- Lobelia coronopifolia L. endemic
- Lobelia cuneifolia Link & Otto, indigenous
  - Lobelia cuneifolia Link & Otto var. ananda E.Wimm. endemic
  - Lobelia cuneifolia Link & Otto var. cuneifolia, endemic
  - Lobelia cuneifolia Link & Otto var. hirsuta (C.Presl) E.Wimm. endemic
- Lobelia cyphioides Harv. endemic
- Lobelia dasyphylla E.Wimm. endemic
- Lobelia decurrentifolia (Kuntze) K.Schum. endemic
- Lobelia dichroma Schltr. endemic
  - Lobelia dodiana E.Wimm. var. dodiana, accepted as Lobelia quadrisepala (R.D.Good) E.Wimm. present
  - Lobelia dodiana E.Wimm. var. radicans (Schonland) E.Wimm. accepted as Lobelia zwartkopensis E.Wimm. present
- Lobelia dregeana (C.Presl) A.DC. indigenous
- Lobelia eckloniana (C.Presl) A.DC. endemic
- Lobelia erinus L. indigenous
- Lobelia esterhuyseniae E.Wimm. accepted as Lobelia comptonii E.Wimm. present
- Lobelia eurypoda E.Wimm. indigenous
  - Lobelia eurypoda E.Wimm. var. eurypoda, indigenous
  - Lobelia eurypoda E.Wimm. var. fissurarum E.Wimm. endemic
- Lobelia flaccida (C.Presl) A.DC. indigenous
  - Lobelia flaccida (C.Presl) A.DC. subsp. flaccida, indigenous
  - Lobelia flaccida (C.Presl) A.DC. subsp. mossiana (R.D.Good) Thulin, indigenous
- Lobelia galpinii Schltr. indigenous
- Lobelia goetzei Diels, indigenous
- Lobelia hypsibata E.Wimm. endemic
- Lobelia jasionoides (A.DC.) E.Wimm. indigenous
  - Lobelia jasionoides (A.DC.) E.Wimm. var. jasionoides, endemic
  - Lobelia jasionoides (A.DC.) E.Wimm. var. sparsiflora (Sond.) E.Wimm. endemic
- Lobelia laurentioides Schltr. endemic
- Lobelia laxa MacOwan, indigenous
- Lobelia limosa (Adamson) E.Wimm. endemic
- Lobelia linarioides (C.Presl) A.DC. accepted as Lobelia flaccida (C.Presl) A.DC. subsp. flaccida, present
- Lobelia linearis Thunb. endemic
- Lobelia lobata E.Wimm. indigenous
- Lobelia malowensis E.Wimm. indigenous
- Lobelia montaguensis E.Wimm. accepted as Lobelia erinus L. present
- Lobelia muscoides Cham. endemic
- Lobelia neglecta Roem. & Schult. endemic
- Lobelia nugax E.Wimm. endemic
- Lobelia oranjensis E.Wimm. accepted as Lobelia erinus L. present
- Lobelia oreas E.Wimm. accepted as Lobelia flaccida (C.Presl) A.DC. subsp. flaccida, present
- Lobelia parvifolia P.J.Bergius, accepted as Wahlenbergia parvifolia (P.J.Bergius) Lammers, endemic
- Lobelia parvisepala E.Wimm. accepted as Lobelia erinus L. present
- Lobelia patula L.f. endemic
- Lobelia pentheri E.Wimm. accepted as Lobelia flaccida (C.Presl) A.DC. subsp. flaccida, present
- Lobelia pinifolia L. endemic
  - Lobelia pinifolia L. var. laricina E.Wimm. accepted as Lobelia tomentosa L.f. present
- Lobelia preslii A.DC. indigenous
- Lobelia pteropoda (C.Presl) A.DC. endemic
- Lobelia pubescens Dryand. ex Aiton, indigenous
  - Lobelia pubescens Dryand. ex Aiton var. holopsida E.Wimm. endemic
  - Lobelia pubescens Dryand. ex Aiton var. incisa (C.Presl) Sond. endemic
  - Lobelia pubescens Dryand. ex Aiton var. jaquiniana Sond. endemic
  - Lobelia pubescens Dryand. ex Aiton var. pubescens, endemic
  - Lobelia pubescens Dryand. ex Aiton var. rotundifolia E.Wimm. endemic
- Lobelia quadrisepala (R.D.Good) E.Wimm. endemic
- Lobelia reinekeana E.Wimm. accepted as Lobelia flaccida (C.Presl) A.DC. subsp. flaccida, present
- Lobelia setacea Thunb. indigenous
  - Lobelia setacea Thunb. var. dissectifolia E.Wimm. endemic
  - Lobelia setacea Thunb. var. setacea, endemic
- Lobelia sonderiana (Kuntze) Lammers, indigenous
- Lobelia stenosiphon (Adamson) E.Wimm. endemic
- Lobelia sutherlandii E.Wimm. accepted as Lobelia flaccida (C.Presl) A.DC. subsp. flaccida, present
- Lobelia thermalis Thunb. indigenous
- Lobelia tomentosa L.f. indigenous
- Lobelia trullifolia Hemsl. indigenous
  - Lobelia trullifolia Hemsl. subsp. delicatula (Compton) Thulin, indigenous
- Lobelia valida L.Bolus, endemic
- Lobelia vanreenensis (Kuntze) K.Schum. indigenous
- Lobelia wilmsiana Diels, accepted as Lobelia flaccida (C.Presl) A.DC. subsp. flaccida, present
- Lobelia zwartkopensis E.Wimm. endemic

=== Monopsis ===
Genus Monopsis:

- Monopsis acrodon E.Wimm. endemic
- Monopsis alba Phillipson, endemic
- Monopsis belliflora E.Wimm. endemic
- Monopsis debilis (L.f.) C.Presl, indigenous
  - Monopsis debilis (L.f.) C.Presl var. debilis, endemic
  - Monopsis debilis (L.f.) C.Presl var. depressa (L.f.) Phillipson, endemic
  - Monopsis debilis (L.f.) C.Presl var. gracilis (C.Presl) Phillipson, endemic
- Monopsis decipiens (Sond.) Thulin, indigenous
- Monopsis flava (C.Presl ex Eckl. & Zeyh.) E.Wimm. endemic
- Monopsis kowynensis E.Wimm. endemic
- Monopsis lutea (L.) Urb. endemic
- Monopsis scabra (Thunb.) Urb. endemic
- Monopsis simplex (L.) E.Wimm. endemic
- Monopsis stellarioides (C.Presl) Urb. indigenous
  - Monopsis stellarioides (C.Presl) Urb. subsp. stellarioides, indigenous
- Monopsis unidentata (Dryand.) E.Wimm. indigenous
  - Monopsis unidentata (Dryand.) E.Wimm. subsp. intermedia Phillipson, endemic
  - Monopsis unidentata (Dryand.) E.Wimm. subsp. laevicaulis (C.Presl) Phillipson, endemic
  - Monopsis unidentata (Dryand.) E.Wimm. subsp. unidentata, endemic
- Monopsis variifolia (Sims) Urb. endemic
- Monopsis zeyheri (Sond.) Thulin, indigenous

=== Unigenes ===
Genus Unigenes:

- Unigenes humifusa A.DC. endemic

=== Wimmerella ===
Genus Wimmerella:

- Wimmerella arabidea (C.Presl) Serra, M.B.Crespo & Lammers, indigenous
- Wimmerella bifida (Thunb.) Serra, M.B.Crespo & Lammers, endemic
- Wimmerella frontidentata (E.Wimm.) Serra, M.B.Crespo & Lammers, endemic
- Wimmerella giftbergensis (E.Phillips) Serra, M.B.Crespo & Lammers, accepted as Wimmerella bifida (Thunb.) Serra, M.B.Crespo & Lammers, present
- Wimmerella hederacea (Sond.) Serra, M.B.Crespo & Lammers, endemic
- Wimmerella hedyotidea (Schltr.) Serra, M.B.Crespo & Lammers, endemic
- Wimmerella longitubus (E.Wimm.) Serra, M.B.Crespo & Lammers, endemic
- Wimmerella mariae (E.Wimm.) Serra, M.B.Crespo & Lammers, endemic
- Wimmerella pygmaea (Thunb.) Serra, M.B.Crespo & Lammers, endemic
- Wimmerella secunda (L.f.) Serra, M.B.Crespo & Lammers, endemic

== Menyanthaceae ==
Family: Menyanthaceae,

=== Nymphoides ===
Genus Nymphoides:

- Nymphoides forbesiana (Griseb.) Kuntze, indigenous
- Nymphoides indica (L.) Kuntze, indigenous
- Nymphoides indica (L.) Kuntze subsp. occidentalis A.Raynal, indigenous
- Nymphoides peltata (S.G.Gmel.) Kuntze, not indigenous, invasive
- Nymphoides rautanenii (N.E.Br.) A.Raynal, indigenous
- Nymphoides thunbergiana (Griseb.) Kuntze, indigenous

=== Villarsia ===
Genus Villarsia

- Villarsia capensis (Houtt.) Merr. endemic
- Villarsia goldblattiana Ornduff, endemic
- Villarsia manningiana Ornduff, endemic
