= Pentatrichia rehmii subsp. avasmontana =

Conservation status
- Least Concern (IUCN 3.1)

Scientific classification
- Kingdom: Plantae
- Clade: Tracheophytes
- Clade: Angiosperms
- Clade: Eudicots
- Clade: Asterids
- Order: Asterales
- Family: Asteraceae
- Genus: Pentatrichia
- Species: P. rehmii
- Subspecies: P. r. subsp. avasmontana

Trinomial name
- Pentatrichia rehmii subsp. avasmontana (Merxm.) Klaassen & Kwembeya

Synonyms
- Pentatrichia avasmontana Merxm.; Pentatrichia confertifolia Merxm.

Species of flowering plant

Pentatrichia rehmii subsp. avasmontana is a subspecies of flowering plant in the family Asteraceae. It is found only in Namibia. Its natural habitat is rocky areas.
