= Atrichantha =

Scientific classification
- Kingdom: Plantae
- Clade: Tracheophytes
- Clade: Angiosperms
- Clade: Eudicots
- Clade: Asterids
- Order: Asterales
- Family: Asteraceae
- Subfamily: Asteroideae
- Tribe: Gnaphalieae
- Genus: Atrichantha; Hilliard & B.L.Burtt
- Species: A. gemmifera

Binomial name
- Atrichantha gemmifera (Bolus) Hilliard & B.L.Burtt

Synonyms
- Helichrysum gemmiferum Bolus

Genus of flowering plants

Atrichantha is a genus of flowering plants in the family Asteraceae.

There is only one known species, Atrichantha gemmifera, endemic to the Cape Province of South Africa.

formerly included

Atrichantha elsiae Hilliard, Synonym of Hydroidea elsiae (Hilliard) P.O.Karis
