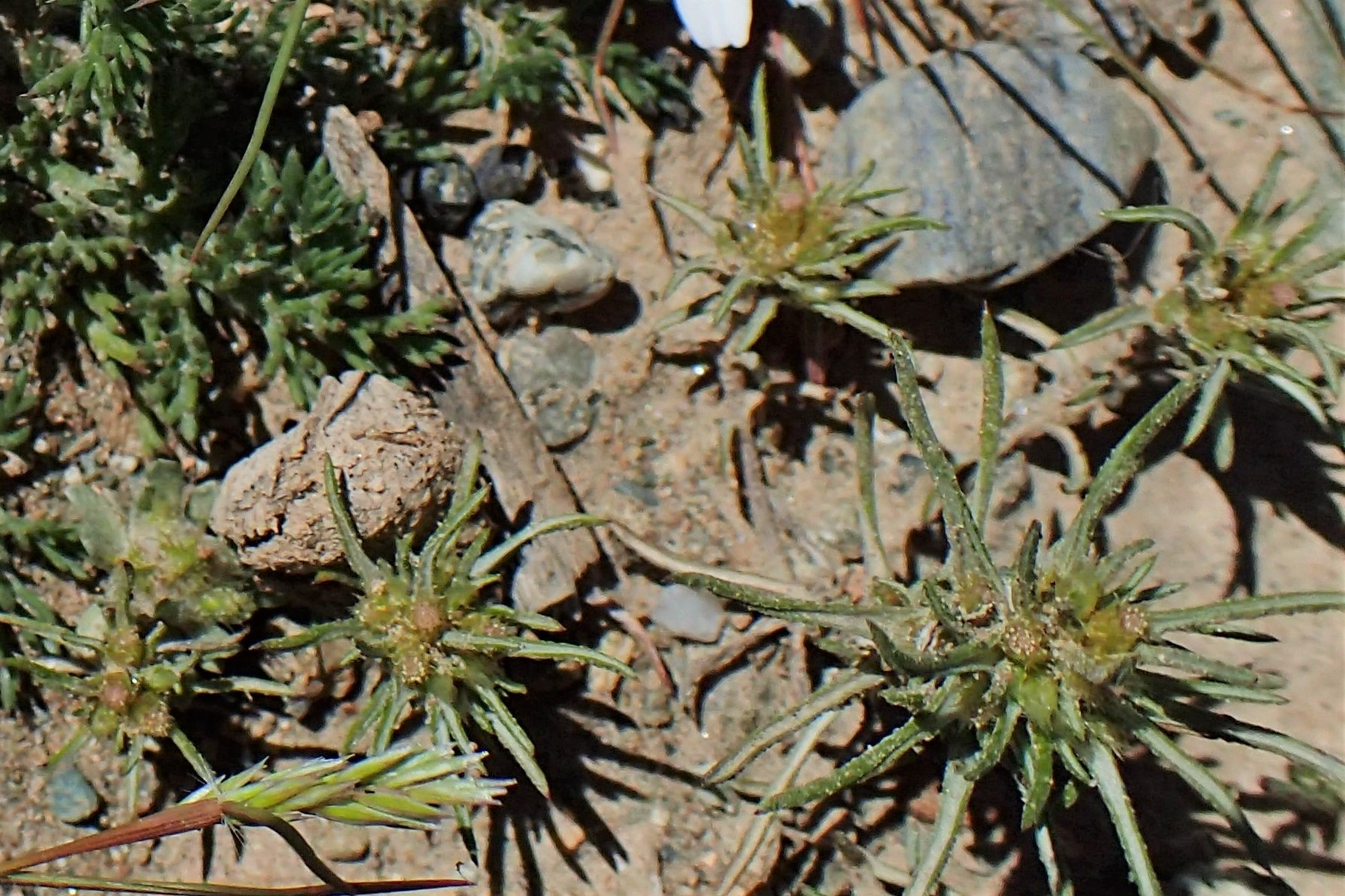

Scientific classification
- Kingdom: Plantae
- Clade: Tracheophytes
- Clade: Angiosperms
- Clade: Eudicots
- Clade: Asterids
- Order: Asterales
- Family: Asteraceae
- Subfamily: Asteroideae
- Tribe: Gnaphalieae
- Genus: Ifloga; Cass.

Synonyms
- Comptonanthus B.Nord.; Trichogyne sect. Ifloga (Cass.) DC.; Petalactella N.E.Br.; Trichogyne Less.

= Ifloga =

Genus of flowering plants

Ifloga is a genus of flowering plants in the family Asteraceae.

Species

Species accepted by the Plants of the World Online as of December 2022:

- Ifloga ambigua (L.) Druce
- Ifloga anomala Hilliard
- Ifloga candida Hilliard
- Ifloga decumbens (Thunb.) Schltr.
- Ifloga glomerata (Harv.) Fourc.
- Ifloga lerouxiae (Beyers) N.G.Bergh
- Ifloga molluginoides (DC.) Hilliard
- Ifloga obovata Bolle
- Ifloga paronychioides (DC.) Fenzl
- Ifloga pilulifera Schltr.
- Ifloga polycnemoides Fenzl
- Ifloga repens (L.) Hilliard & B.L.Burtt
- Ifloga spicata (Forssk.) Sch.Bip.
- Ifloga thellungiana Hilliard & B.L.Burtt
