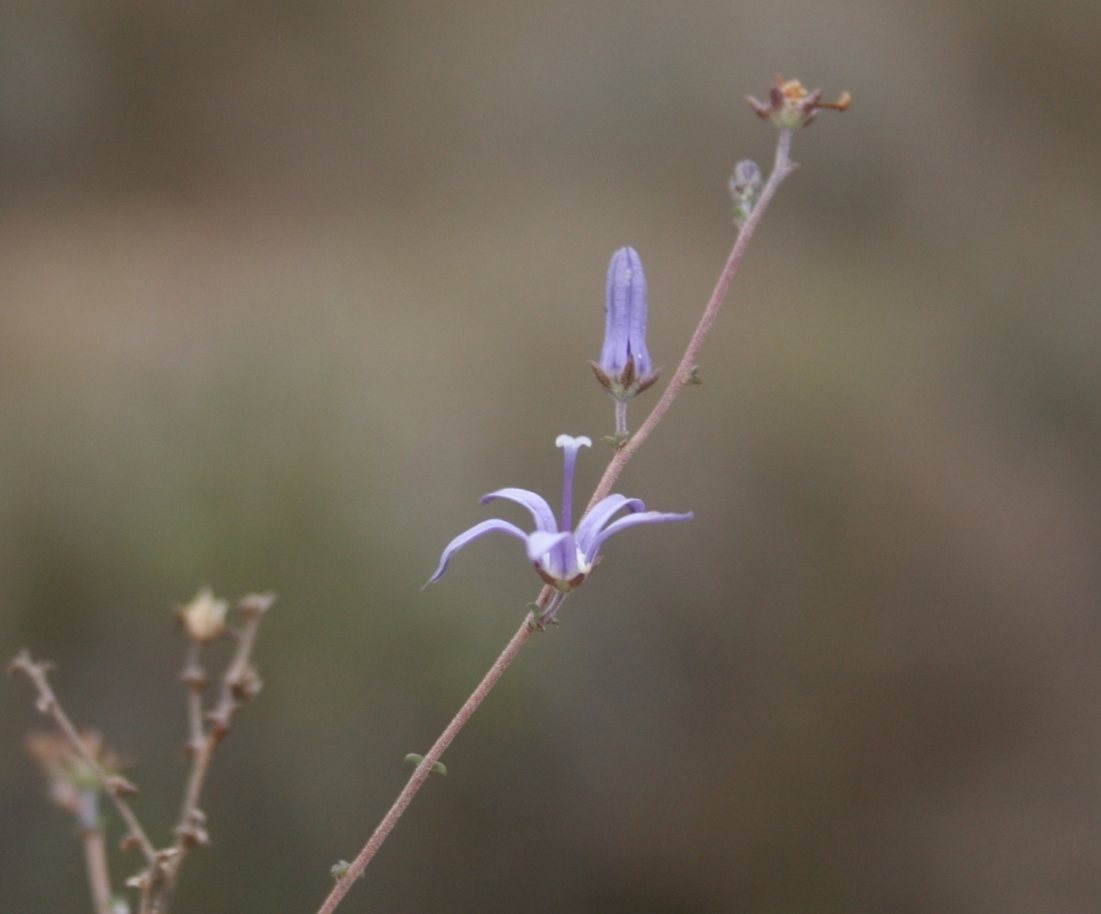

Scientific classification
- Kingdom: Plantae
- Clade: Tracheophytes
- Clade: Angiosperms
- Clade: Eudicots
- Clade: Asterids
- Order: Asterales
- Family: Campanulaceae
- Genus: Wahlenbergia
- Species: W. loddigesii

Binomial name
- Wahlenbergia loddigesii (A.DC.) I.M.Turner

Synonyms
- Lightfootia loddigesii A.DC.; Lightfootia tenerrima H.Buek; Lightfootia tenella var. tenerrima (H.Buek) Sond.; Wahlenbergia tenerrima (H.Buek) Lammers; Lightfootia tenella G.Lodd.

= Wahlenbergia loddigesii =

Species of flowering plant

Wahlenbergia loddigesii is a herbaceous plant in the family Campanulaceae native to the southern Cape regions of South Africa.

== Description ==
Wahlenbergia loddigesii has a slender, rambling, diffuse-sprawling growth-habit.

Its leaves are small, lanceolate (or ovate-lanceolate), somewhat thick and strongly recurved. The leaf tips are acute-acuminate and the margins are normally entire.

Its flowers are born in diffuse partial racemes, at the tips of long slender (often branched) flowering branches. The flowers are solitary or in pairs.

The petals are strongly recurved. The outside of the petals is usually blue, but can more rarely be purple or white. The style is usually blue-tipped. The base of the filaments is rhombic and ciliate. Its calyx lobes are short (1.5-2mm), triangular acute, faintly keeled and slightly revolute along the edges.

The ovary is usually minutely hairy, only half inferior, and basally rounded.

== Distribution and habitat ==
This species is indigenous to the Western Cape and Eastern Cape provinces of South Africa. It occurs from Ceres and Worcester in the west, to Bredasdorp in the south, Ladismith, Oudtshoorn and Prince Albert in the north, and eastwards as far as Port Elizabeth and Somerset East. (A variety, W. loddigesii var. montana, is sometimes recognised for the more gracile, pale-flowered plants occurring in the Swartberg mountains, at the top of the Swartberg Pass.)

Wahlenbergia loddigesii is most commonly found in dry, stony areas, on slopes or rocky hills.

This species is similar to, and often confused with, Wahlenbergia tenella and Wahlenbergia nodosa.
