= Lachnospermum =

Scientific classification
- Kingdom: Plantae
- Clade: Tracheophytes
- Clade: Angiosperms
- Clade: Eudicots
- Clade: Asterids
- Order: Asterales
- Family: Asteraceae
- Subfamily: Asteroideae
- Tribe: Gnaphalieae
- Genus: Lachnospermum; Willd.

Type species
- Lachnospermum ericifolium (syn of L. fasciculatum) Willd.

Synonyms
- Carpholoma D.Don

Genus of flowering plants

Lachnospermum, common name rooiblombos, is a genus of South African flowering plants in the family Asteraceae.

Species

- Lachnospermum fasciculatum (Thunb.) Baill. - Cape Province of South Africa
- Lachnospermum imbricatum (P.J.Bergius) Hilliard - South Africa
- Lachnospermum umbellatum (D.Don) Pillans - Cape Province of South Africa
