= Gymnostephium =

Scientific classification
- Kingdom: Plantae
- Clade: Tracheophytes
- Clade: Angiosperms
- Clade: Eudicots
- Clade: Asterids
- Order: Asterales
- Family: Asteraceae
- Subfamily: Asteroideae
- Tribe: Astereae
- Subtribe: Homochrominae
- Genus: Gymnostephium; Less.

Type species
- Gymnostephium hirsutum Less.

Synonyms
- Heteractis DC.; Zyrphelis sect. Gymnostephium (Less.) Zinnecker

Genus of flowering plants

Gymnostephium is a genus of flowering plants in the family Asteraceae.

Species

All the species are endemic to the Cape Provinces region of South Africa.

- Gymnostephium angustifolium Harv.
- Gymnostephium ciliare (DC.) Harv.
- Gymnostephium corymbosum (Turcz.) Harv.
- Gymnostephium fruticosum DC.
- Gymnostephium gracile Less.
- Gymnostephium hirsutum Less.
- Gymnostephium leve Bolus
- Gymnostephium papposum G.L.Nesom
