= Poecilolepis =

Scientific classification
- Kingdom: Plantae
- Clade: Tracheophytes
- Clade: Angiosperms
- Clade: Eudicots
- Clade: Asterids
- Order: Asterales
- Family: Asteraceae
- Subfamily: Asteroideae
- Tribe: Astereae
- Subtribe: Homochrominae
- Genus: Poecilolepis; Grau

Type species
- Poecilolepis ficoidea (DC.) Grau

Genus of plants

Poecilolepis is a genus of flowering plants in the tribe Astereae within the family Asteraceae, which is endemic to the Cape Provinces of South AFrica.

Species

- Poecilolepis ficoidea (DC.) Grau
- Poecilolepis maritima (Bolus) Grau
