= Roodebergia =

Scientific classification
- Kingdom: Plantae
- Clade: Tracheophytes
- Clade: Angiosperms
- Clade: Eudicots
- Clade: Asterids
- Order: Asterales
- Family: Asteraceae
- Subfamily: Asteroideae
- Tribe: Astereae
- Subtribe: Homochrominae
- Genus: Roodebergia; B.Nord.
- Species: R. kitamurana

Binomial name
- Roodebergia kitamurana B.Nord.

Genus of plants

Roodebergia is a monotypic genus of flowering plants belonging to the family Asteraceae. The only species is Roodebergia kitamurana.

Its native range is South African Republic.
