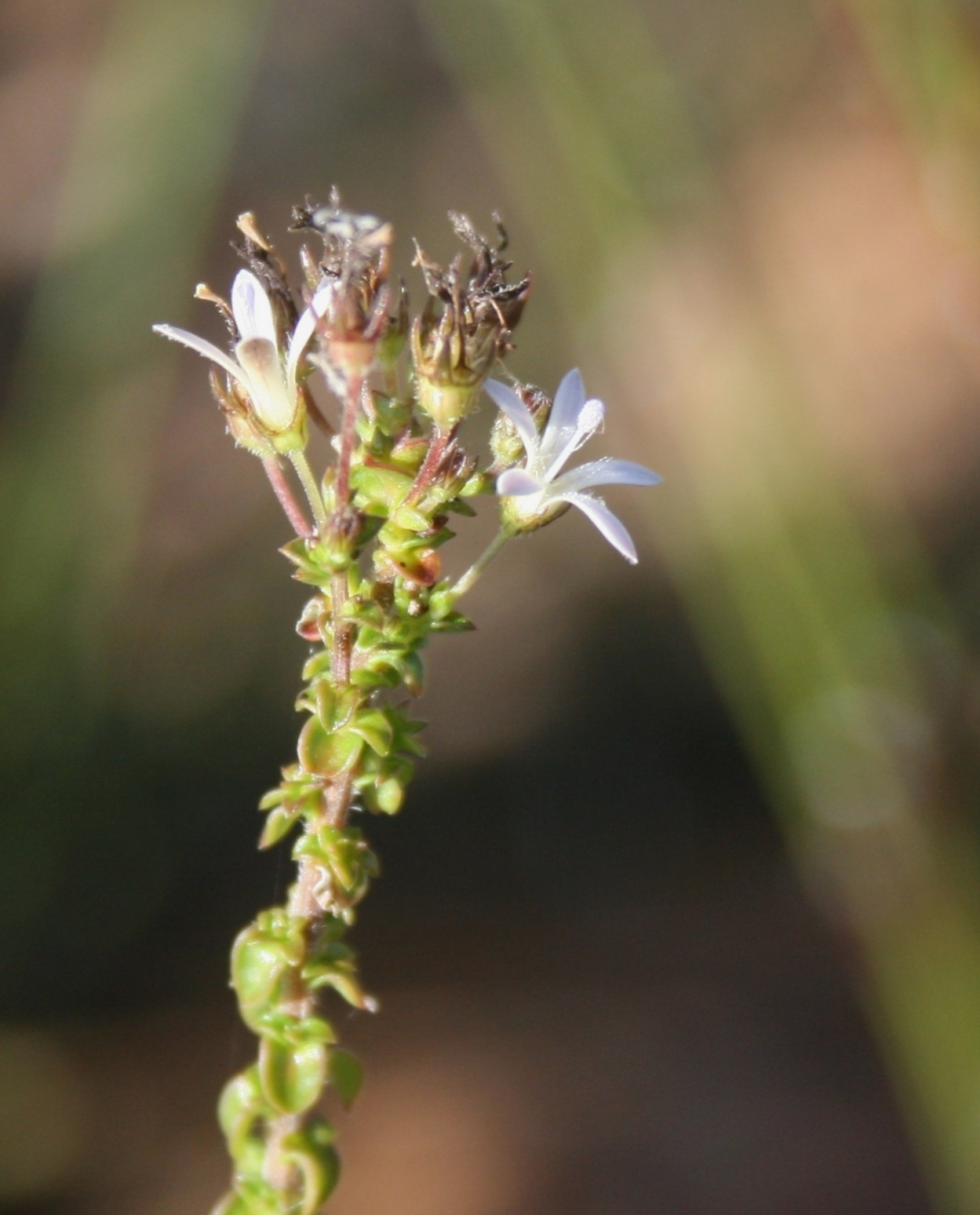

Scientific classification
- Kingdom: Plantae
- Clade: Tracheophytes
- Clade: Angiosperms
- Clade: Eudicots
- Clade: Asterids
- Order: Asterales
- Family: Campanulaceae
- Genus: Wahlenbergia
- Species: W. tenella

Binomial name
- Wahlenbergia tenella (L.f.) Lammers

Synonyms
- Campanula tenella L.f.; Lightfootia tenella (L.f.) A.DC.; Lightfootia diffusa Buek

= Wahlenbergia tenella =

Species of flowering plant

Wahlenbergia tenella (known as the "Fine Capebell") is a herbaceous plant in the family Campanulaceae native to the southern Cape regions of South Africa.

== Description ==
Wahlenbergia tenella has an erect-sprawling growth-habit.

Its leaves are small, ovate, thick and strongly recurved. The leaf tips are acute and the margins are entire (sometimes with a few minute marginal teeth near the leaf base).

Its flowers are assembled at the tips of the stems, often in groups of about three. The petals are strongly recurved, sometimes slightly cucullate at the tip. The outside of the petals ranges in colour from purple to blue to white. The style is usually blue-tipped. The base of the filaments is truncate-to-obovate (sometimes even appearing to be 3-lobed), and is covered in thick, short cilia. Its calyx lobes are relatively short (2-3mm), acute, involute and, as with the leaves, sometimes with a few minute marginal teeth near the base.

The ovary is usually glabrous, and more than half inferior. Basally it is hemispherical or occasionally slightly flattened or pointed.

== Distribution and habitat ==
Wahlenbergia tenella is indigenous to the Western Cape and Eastern Cape provinces of South Africa. It occurs from Cape Town in the west, to Bredasdorp in the south, Ladismith in the north, and eastwards as far as Port Elizabeth and Queenstown in the Eastern Cape Province. It is most commonly found in lower altitude sandy substrates, especially on coastal plains but also sometimes inland.

This species is similar to, and often confused with, Wahlenbergia tenerrima and Wahlenbergia nodosa.

== Varieties ==
Wahlenbergia tenella has two recognised varieties:

- W. tenella var. palustris (Adamson) W.G.Welman. Indigenous to marshes, river-banks and moist, mountainous habitats in the Langeberg, between Swellendam and Riversdale.
- W. tenella var. stokoei (Adamson) W.G.Welman. Indigenous to the low coastal mountains between Caledon and Bredasdorp.
