= Tenrhynea =

Scientific classification
- Kingdom: Plantae
- Clade: Tracheophytes
- Clade: Angiosperms
- Clade: Eudicots
- Clade: Asterids
- Order: Asterales
- Family: Asteraceae
- Subfamily: Asteroideae
- Tribe: Gnaphalieae
- Genus: Tenrhynea; Hilliard & B.L.Burtt
- Species: T. phylicifolia

Binomial name
- Tenrhynea phylicifolia (DC.) Hilliard & B.L.Burtt

Synonyms
- Rhynea DC. 1838, illegitimate name not Scop. 1777 (Clusiaceae); Helichrysum phylicaefolium DC.; Cassinia phylicifolia (DC.) J.M.Wood; Rhynea phylicifolia DC.

Genus of plants

Tenrhynea is a genus of Southern African plants in the tribe Gnaphalieae within the family Asteraceae.

Species

The only known species is Tenrhynea phylicifolia, found in Eastern Cape, KwaZulu-Natal, Limpopo, Mpumalanga, and Eswatini
