= Calotesta =

Scientific classification
- Kingdom: Plantae
- Clade: Tracheophytes
- Clade: Angiosperms
- Clade: Eudicots
- Clade: Asterids
- Order: Asterales
- Family: Asteraceae
- Subfamily: Asteroideae
- Tribe: Gnaphalieae
- Genus: Calotesta; P.O.Karis
- Species: C. alba

Binomial name
- Calotesta alba P.O.Karis

Genus of flowering plants

Calotesta is a monotypic genus of flowering plants in the family Asteraceae, containing the single species Calotesta alba. It is endemic to the Western Cape of South Africa, where it is limited to the Klein Swartberge Mountains.

This plant is characterized by the thick, cutinized coating on its seeds. When the species was described in 1990, it fit into no existing genera, so the new genus Calotesta was erected to house it.

The plant grows on steep sandstone cliff faces in the fynbos.

It is designated a critically rare taxon in South Africa because it is limited to a single mountain range, but it is not considered to be a threatened species.
