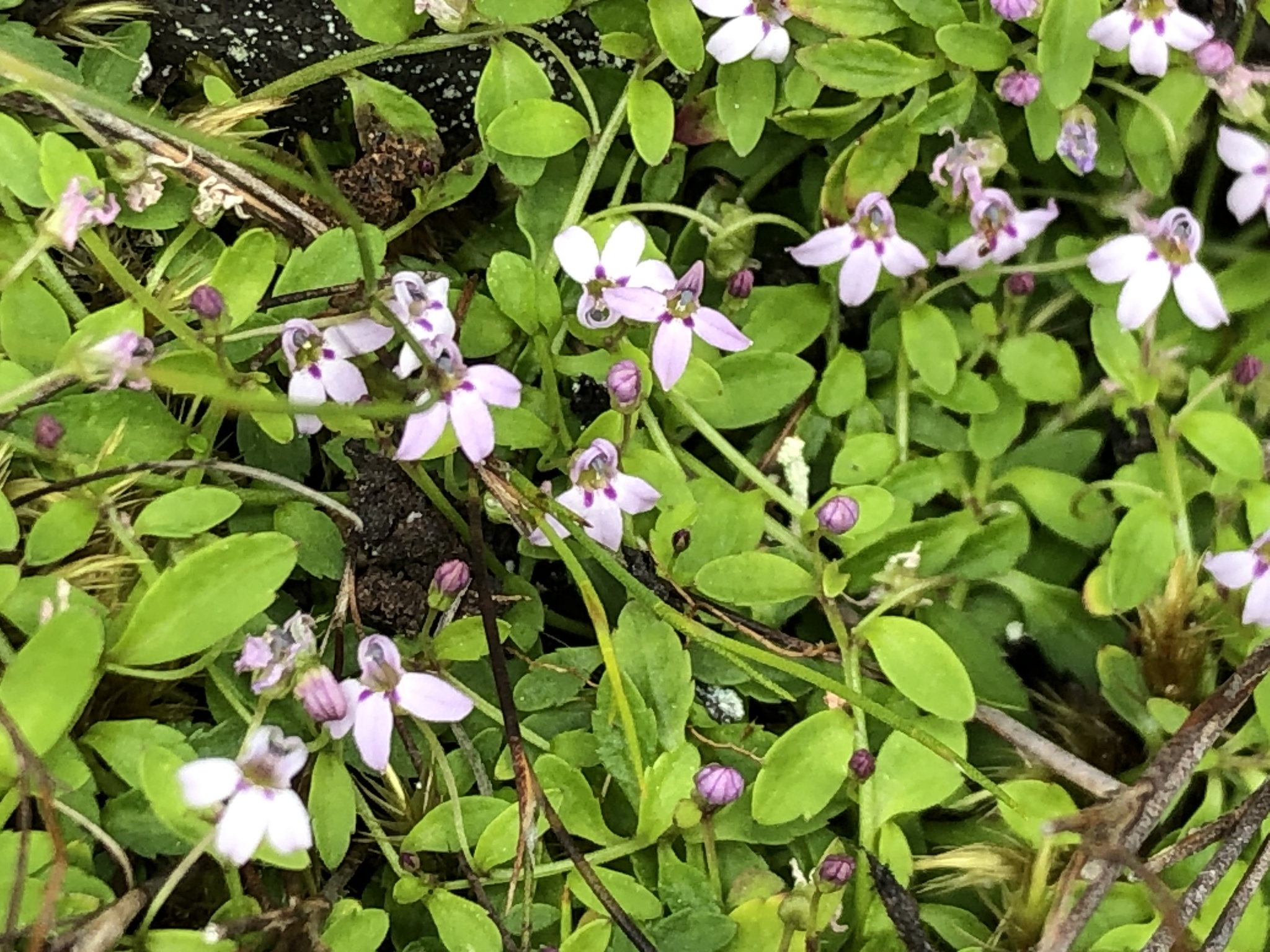
- Unigenes humifusa

Scientific classification
- Kingdom: Plantae
- Clade: Tracheophytes
- Clade: Angiosperms
- Clade: Eudicots
- Clade: Asterids
- Order: Asterales
- Family: Campanulaceae
- Subfamily: Lobelioideae
- Genus: Unigenes; E.Wimm.
- Species: U. humifusa

Binomial name
- Unigenes humifusa (A.DC.) E.Wimm.

Synonyms
- Mezleria humifusa A.DC. in A.P.de Candolle; Dortmanna humifusa (A.DC.) Kuntze; Lobelia disperma E.Wimm. in H.G.A.Engler

= Unigenes =

Genus of flowering plants

Unigenes is a genus of plants in the Campanulaceae. It has only one known species, Unigenes humifusa, endemic to the Cape Provinces of South Africa.
