= Rhigiophyllum =

Scientific classification
- Kingdom: Plantae
- Clade: Tracheophytes
- Clade: Angiosperms
- Clade: Eudicots
- Clade: Asterids
- Order: Asterales
- Family: Campanulaceae
- Genus: Rhigiophyllum; Hochst. (1842)
- Species: R. squarrosum

Binomial name
- Rhigiophyllum squarrosum Hochst. (1842)

Genus of plants

Rhigiophyllum is a genus of flowering plants belonging to the family Campanulaceae. It contains a single species, Rigiophyllum squarrosum, a subshrub or shrub endemic to the Cape Provinces of South Africa.
