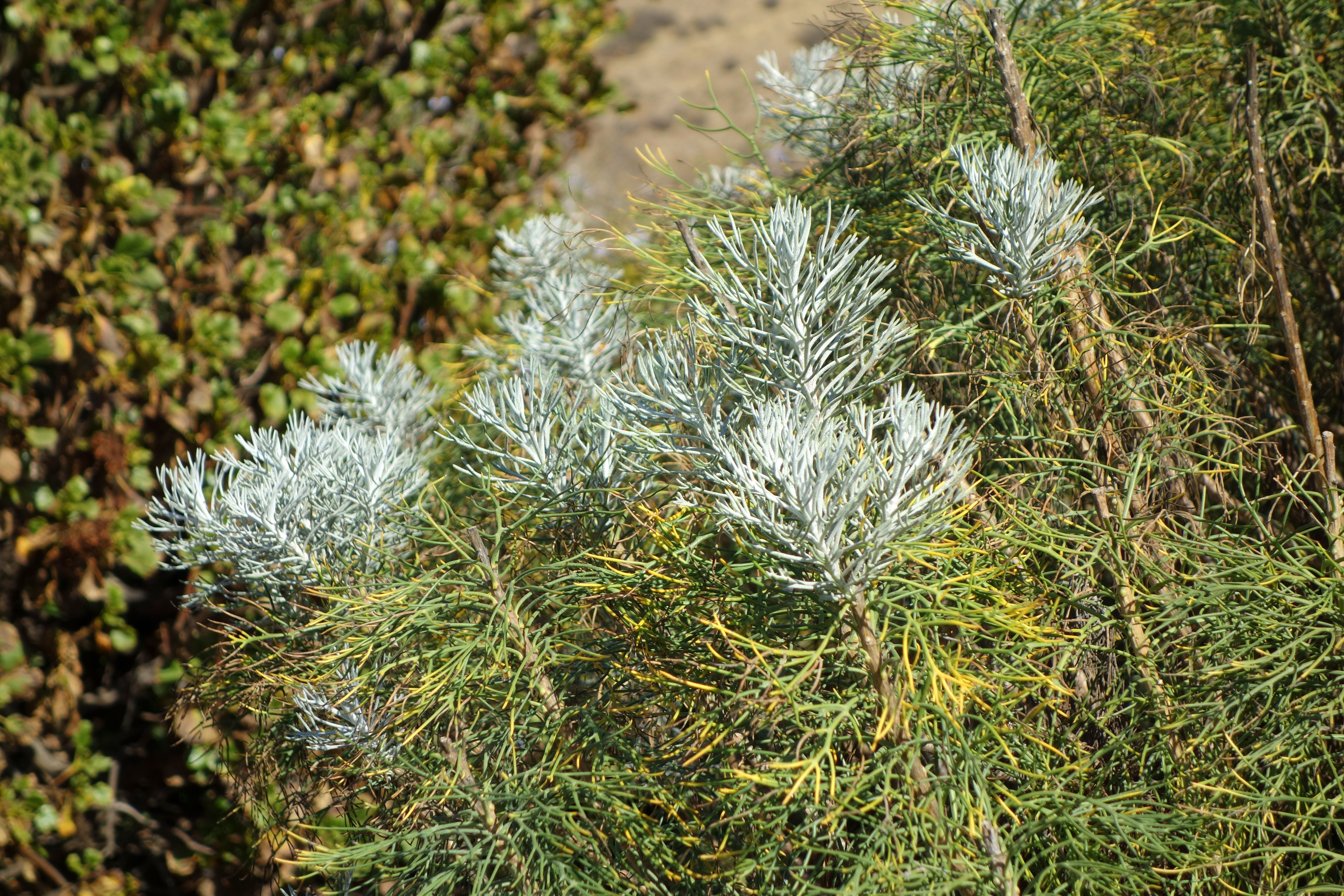
- Phymaspermum acerosum

Scientific classification
- Kingdom: Plantae
- Clade: Tracheophytes
- Clade: Angiosperms
- Clade: Eudicots
- Clade: Asterids
- Order: Asterales
- Family: Asteraceae
- Subfamily: Asteroideae
- Tribe: Anthemideae
- Genus: Phymaspermum; Less.

Type species
- Phymaspermum junceum Less.

Synonyms
- Adenachaena DC. (1838); Adenochaena DC. (1838), orth. var.; Brachymeris DC.; Brachystylis E.Mey. ex DC. (1838), pro syn.; Iocaste E.Mey. ex Harv. (1865), nom. superfl.; Jacosta DC. (1838), pro syn.; Oligoglossa DC. (1838)

= Phymaspermum =

Genus of plants in the chamomile tribe within the daisy family

Phymaspermum is a genus of southern African plants in the chamomile tribe within the daisy family. It is native to Botswana, Eswatini, Lesotho, Namibia, South Africa, and Zimbabwe.

Species

- Phymaspermum acerosum
- Phymaspermum aciculare
- Phymaspermum appressum
- Phymaspermum argenteum
- Phymaspermum athanasioides
- Phymaspermum bolusii
- Phymaspermum carnosulum
- Phymaspermum diddifolium
- Phymaspermum equisetoides
- Phymaspermum erubescens
- Phymaspermum junceum
- Phymaspermum leptophyllum
- Phymaspermum montanum
- Phymaspermum parvifolium
- Phymaspermum peglerae
- Phymaspermum pinnatifidum
- Phymaspermum pubescens
- Phymaspermum schroeteri
- Phymaspermum scoparium
- Phymaspermum villosum
- Phymaspermum woodii
