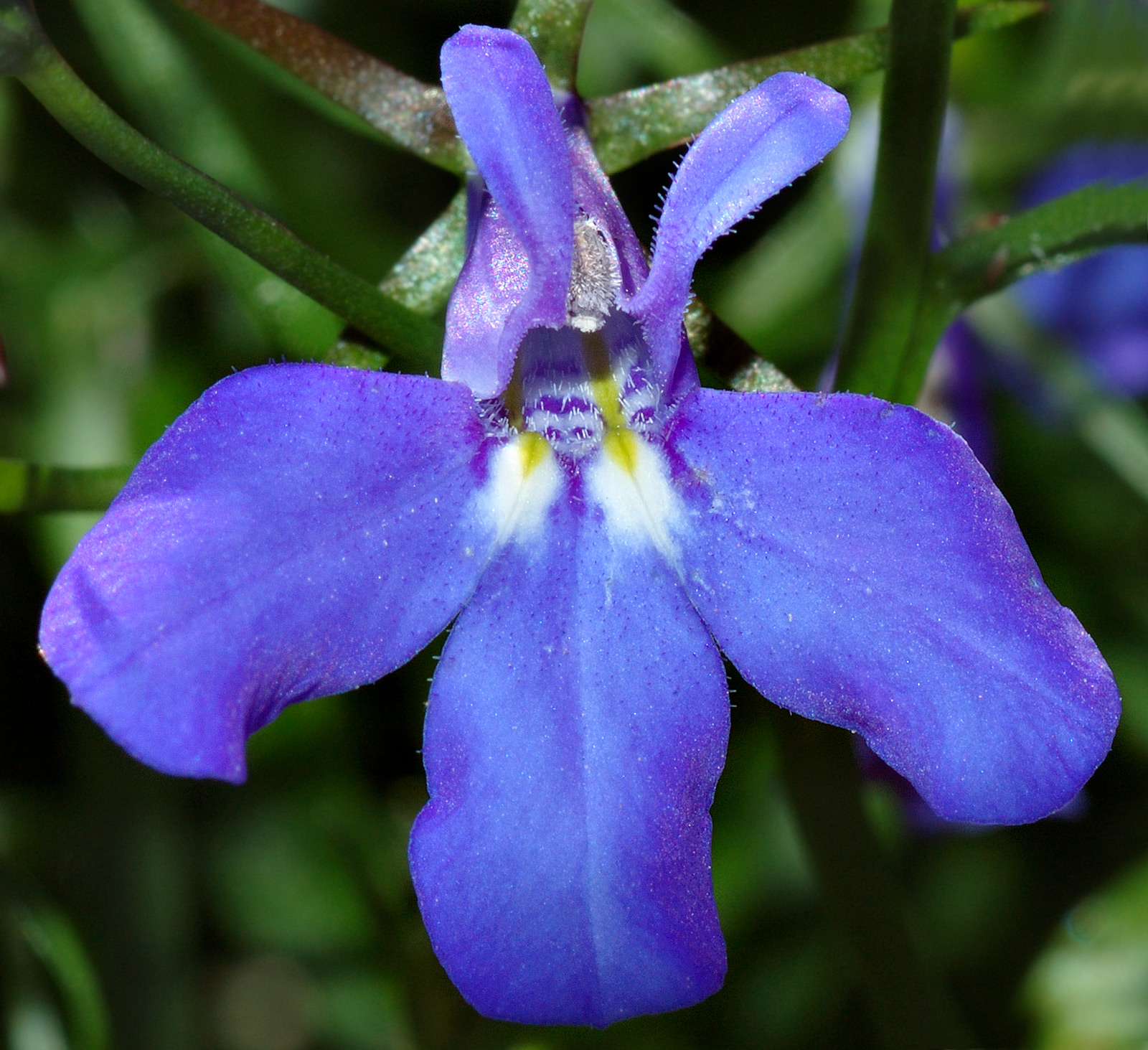

Scientific classification
- Kingdom: Plantae
- Clade: Tracheophytes
- Clade: Angiosperms
- Clade: Eudicots
- Clade: Asterids
- Order: Asterales
- Family: Campanulaceae
- Genus: Lobelia
- Species: L. erinus

Binomial name
- Lobelia erinus L.

Synonyms
- List: Dortmannia debilis var. natalensis Kuntze; Dortmannia erinoides (L.) Kuntze; Dortmannia erinus (L.) Kuntze; Dortmannia flexuosa (C.Presl) Kuntze; Dortmannia lavandulacea (Klotzsch) Kuntze; Dortmannia senegalensis (A.DC.) Kuntze; Enchysia erinoides (L.) C.Presl; Grammatotheca erinoides (L.) Sond.; Laurentia erinoides (L.) G.Nicholson; Lobelia acutangula (C.Presl) A.DC.; Lobelia algoensis A.DC.; Lobelia altimontis E.Wimm.; Lobelia bellidifolia L.f.; Lobelia bellidifolia Thunb.; Lobelia benguellensis Hiern; Lobelia bicolor Sims; Lobelia bracteolata A.DC.; Lobelia candida Link nom. inval.; Lobelia chilawana Schinz; Lobelia dortmannii Dammann; Lobelia erinifolia Salisb. nom. illeg.; Lobelia erinoides L.; Lobelia erinoides Thunb.; Lobelia filiformis f. albiflora E.Wimm.; Lobelia filiformis var. filiformis; Lobelia filiformis f. multipilis E.Wimm.; Lobelia filiformis f. muzandazora E.Wimm.; Lobelia filiformis var. natalensis (A.DC.) E.Wimm.; Lobelia jugosa S.Moore; Lobelia keilhackii E.Wimm.; Lobelia kohautiana Vatke nom. illeg.; Lobelia lavendulacea Klotzsch; Lobelia lydenburgensis E.Wimm.; Lobelia melsetteria E.Wimm. nom. inval.; Lobelia montaguensis E.Wimm.; Lobelia natalensis A.DC.; Lobelia nuda Hemsl.; Lobelia nuzana E.Wimm.; Lobelia oranjensis E.Wimm.; Lobelia parvifolia Raf. nom. illeg.; Lobelia polyodon E.Wimm.; Lobelia procumbens J.Forbes; Lobelia pubescens var. simplex Kuntze; Lobelia raridentata E.Wimm.; Lobelia rosulata S.Moore; Lobelia schrankii Sweet; Lobelia senegalensis A.DC.; Lobelia transvaalensis Schltr.; Lobelia trierarchii R.D.Good; Lobelia turgida E.Wimm.; Lobelia wildii E.Wimm.; Monopsis conspicua Salisb. nom. illeg.; Monopsis debilis var. conspicua Sond.; Monopsis simplex var. conspicua (Sond.) E.Wimm.; Rapuntium acutangulum C.Presl; Rapuntium bellidifolium (L.f.) C.Presl; Rapuntium bicolor (Sims) C.Presl; Rapuntium erinoides (L.) Mill.; Rapuntium erinus (L.) Mill.; Rapuntium kohautianum C.Presl; Rapuntium krebsianum C.Presl; Rapuntium procumbens (J.Forbes) C.Presl

= Lobelia erinus =

Species of flowering plant

Lobelia erinus (edging lobelia, garden lobelia or trailing lobelia) is a species of flowering plant in the bellflower family Campanulaceae, native to southern Africa.

== Description ==
It is a low growing, prostrate or scrambling herbaceous perennial plant growing to 8–15 cm tall. The basal leaves are oval, 10 mm long and 4–8 mm broad, with a toothed margin; leaves higher on the stems are slender and sometimes untoothed.

The flowers are blue to violet in wild plants, with a five-lobed corolla 8–20 mm across; they are produced in loose panicles. About 0.5 to 4.5 inches long inflorescence stems are about 5 inches long, loose racemose inflorescences with many flowers. The hermaphrodite flower is zygomorphic with a length of up to 1 centimeter and quinate with double perianth. The five sepals are fused. The fan-shaped lower lip is trilobed. The color of the crown varies depending on the variety between white, blue, purple, pink or red and the center is yellow or white. The five stamens are 3 to 7 millimeters long.

The fruit is a 5–8 mm capsule containing numerous small seeds.

== Range ==
The distribution area lies in southern Africa and extends from Malawi, Mozambique, Zambia and Zimbabwe to the south to Botswana, Namibia, Eswatini, Lesotho and the South African provinces. L. erinus also occurs as a weed where it has escaped from cultivation.

== Cultivation and uses ==
Lobelia erinus is a very popular edging plant in gardens, especially for hanging baskets and window boxes. In temperate zones it is grown as a half-hardy annual, i.e. sown under glass with some heat in spring, then planted out when all danger of frost has passed. Alternatively plants can be purchased from garden centres as young "plug" plants, to be transferred outside in May or June.

=== Cultivars ===
Numerous cultivars have been selected, either with a bushy or a trailing habit, in a wide range of flower colours, including white, pink, magenta ("red"), pale to dark blue, and purple, often with a prominent white eye. Some of the better known cultivars include 'Blue Moon', 'Gracilis', 'Crystal Palace', 'Sapphire', 'Rosamund' and 'Riviera Rose'.

In the United Kingdom the following cultivars have gained the Royal Horticultural Society's Award of Garden Merit:

- 'Cambridge Blue'
- Cascade Series
- 'Colour Cascade'
- 'Crystal Palace'
- 'Mrs Clibran'
- Purple Star=‘Westpurstar’
- 'Regatta Midnight Blue'
- 'Regatta Sky Blue'
- 'Richardii' syn. Lobelia richardsonii
- 'Riviera Blue Eyes'
- 'String of Pearls'
- Techno Heat Trailing Light Blue Improved=‘Lobstrahob’
- Waterfall Blue=‘Balobwablu’ (Waterfall Series)

== Gallery ==
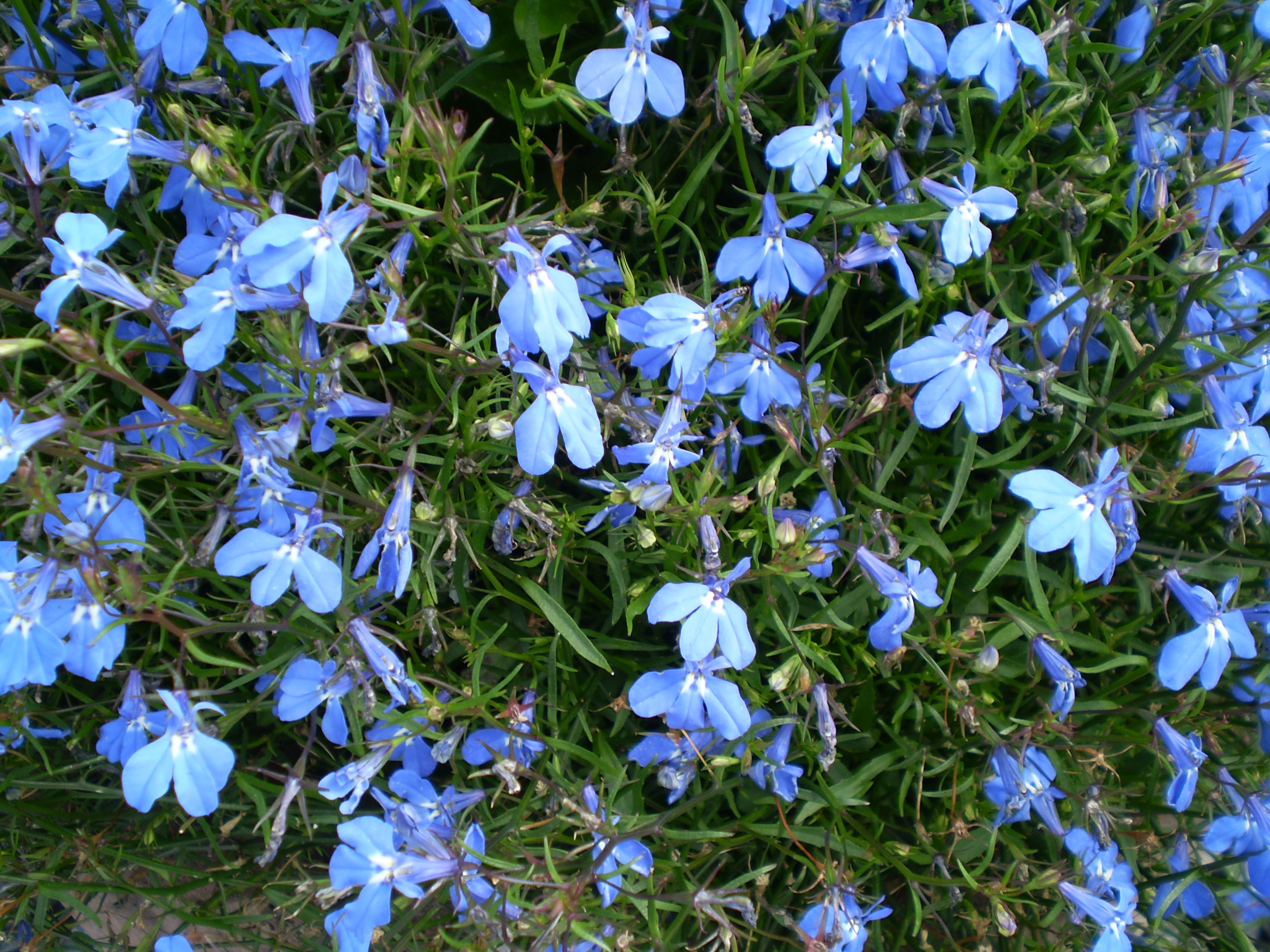
'Cambridge Blue'

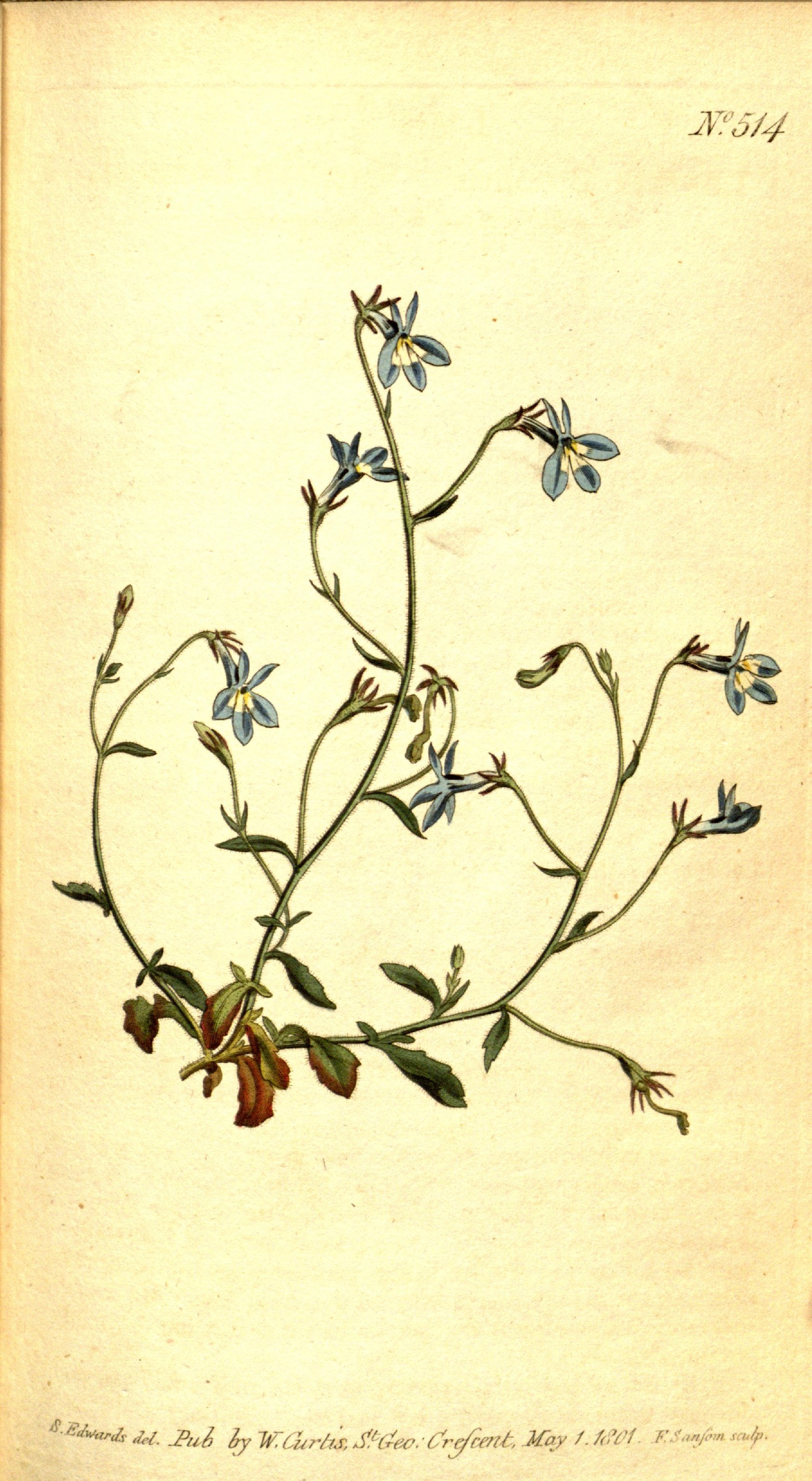
Illustration

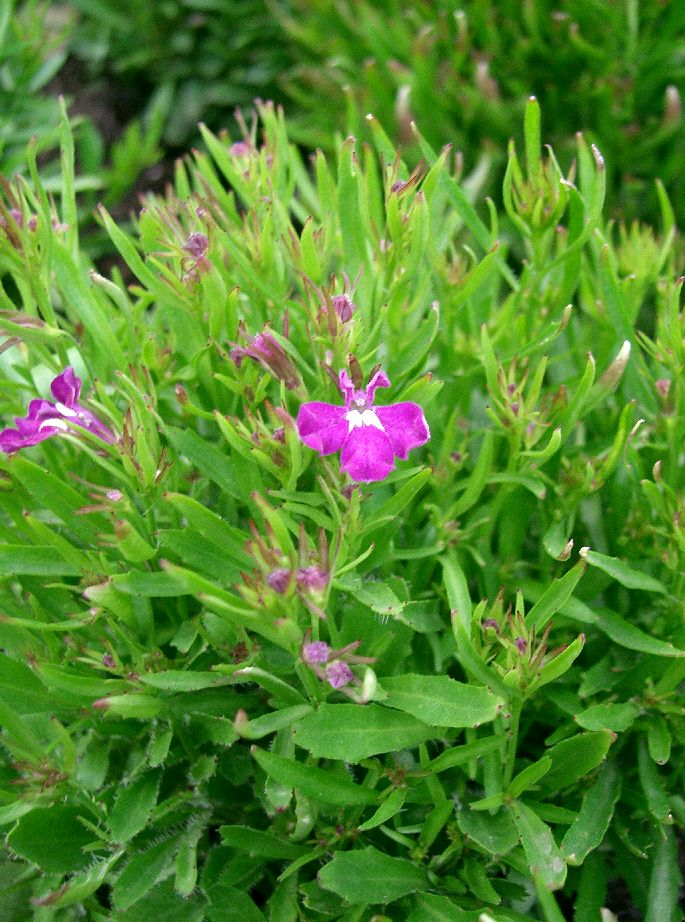
'Riviera Rose'

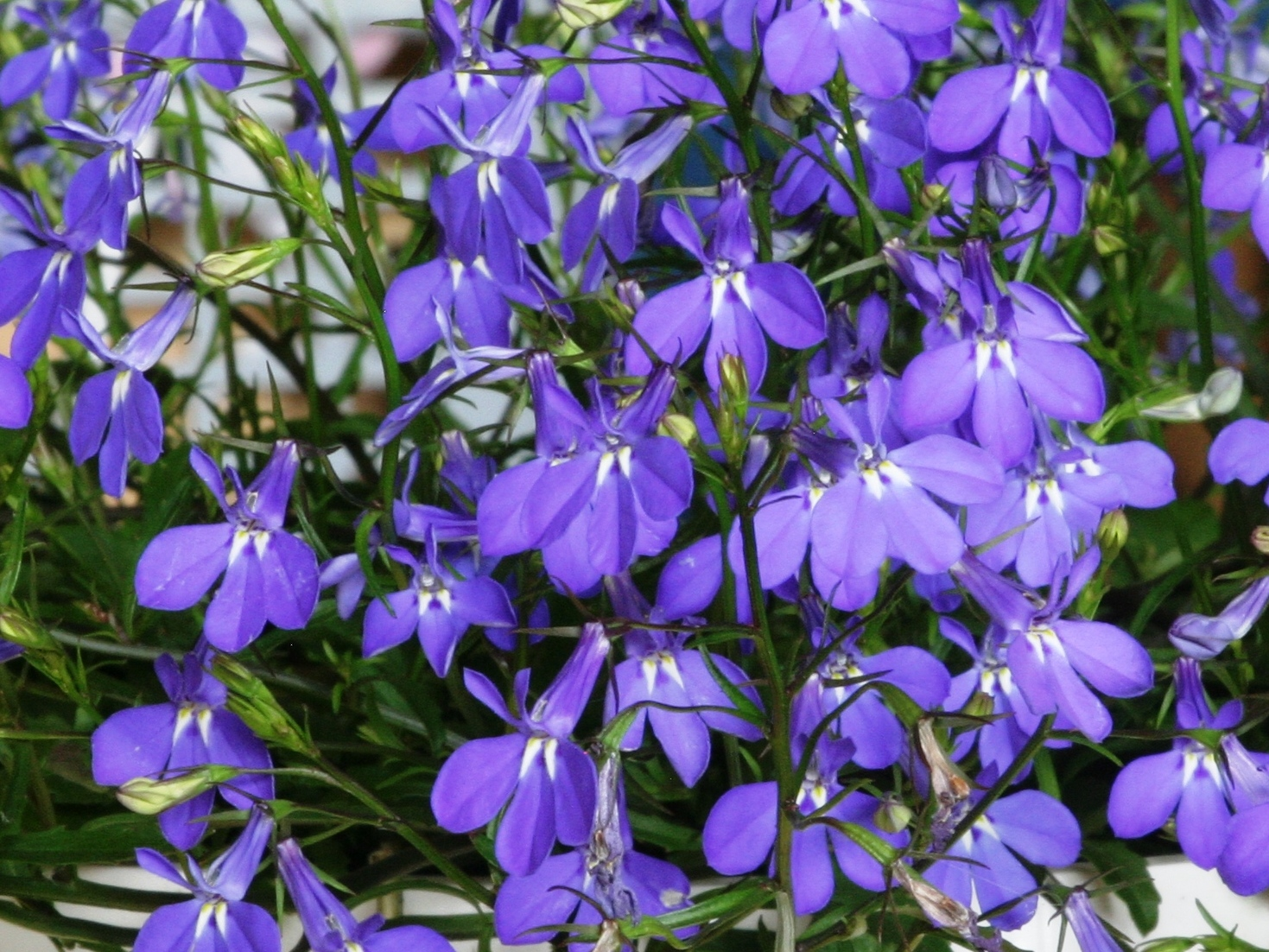
'Sapphire'
