= Pterothrix =

Scientific classification
- Kingdom: Plantae
- Clade: Tracheophytes
- Clade: Angiosperms
- Clade: Eudicots
- Clade: Asterids
- Order: Asterales
- Family: Asteraceae
- Genus: Pterothrix; DC. (1838)

Species
- Pterothrix cymbifolia Harv.; Pterothrix perotrichoides Harv.; Pterothrix spinescens DC.

Genus of plants

Pterothrix is a genus of flowering plants in family Asteraceae. It includes three species native to southern Africa, ranging from Namibia through the Cape Provinces, Northern Provinces, and Free State of South Africa to Lesotho.
