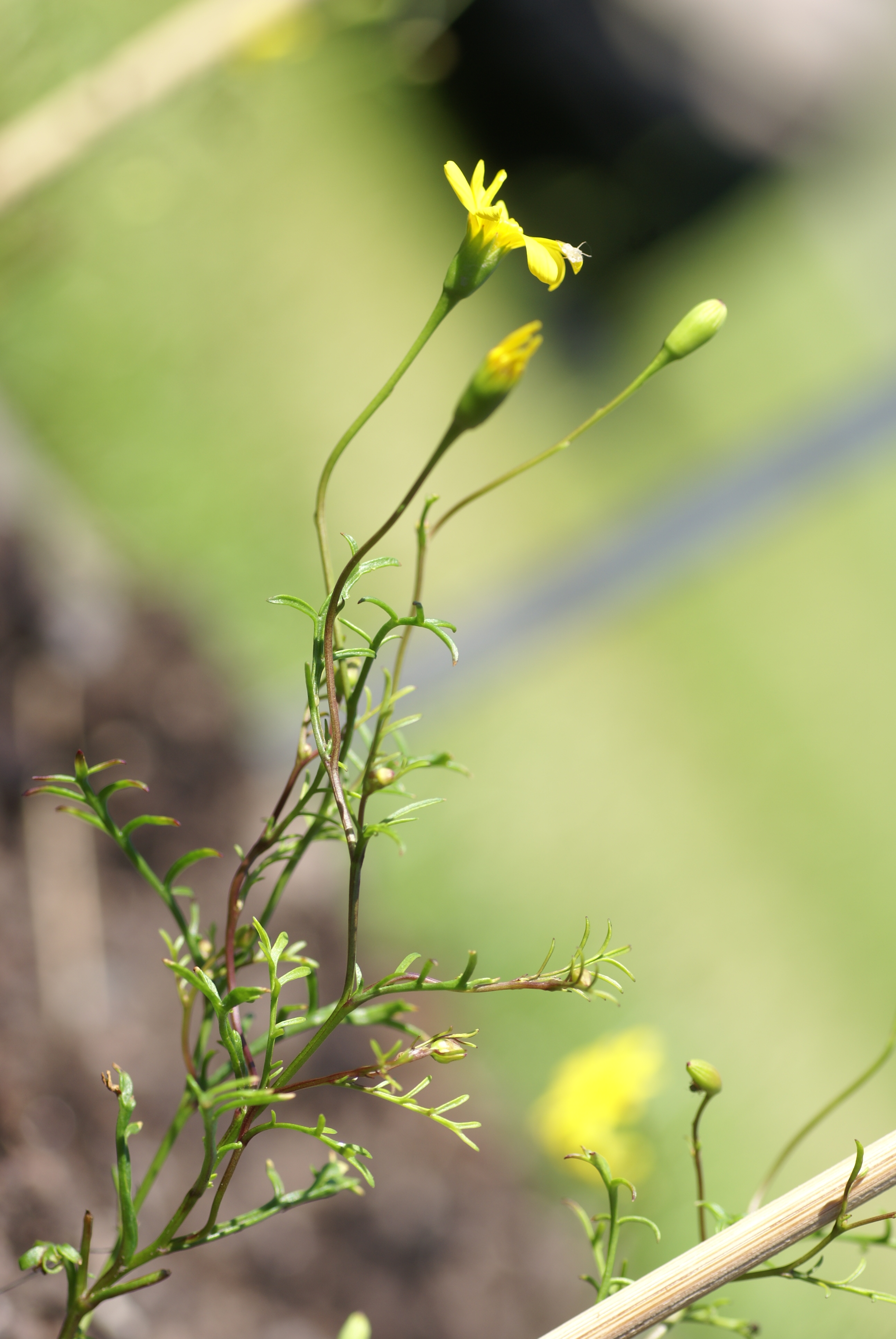
- Steirodiscus tagetes

Scientific classification
- Kingdom: Plantae
- Clade: Tracheophytes
- Clade: Angiosperms
- Clade: Eudicots
- Clade: Asterids
- Order: Asterales
- Family: Asteraceae
- Subfamily: Asteroideae
- Tribe: Senecioneae
- Genus: Steirodiscus; Less.

Synonyms
- Psilothonna (E.Mey. ex DC.) E.Phillips (1950)

= Steirodiscus =

Genus of plants

Steirodiscus is a genus of South African plants in the groundsel tribe within the Asteraceae. It is endemic to the Cape Provinces.

Some species are used as garden plants. Cultivars include 'Gold Rush'.

Species

- Steirodiscus capillaceus
- Steirodiscus gamolepis
- Steirodiscus linearilobus
- Steirodiscus speciosus
- Steirodiscus tagetes

formerly included

Steirodiscus chrysanthemoides - Euryops chrysanthemoides
