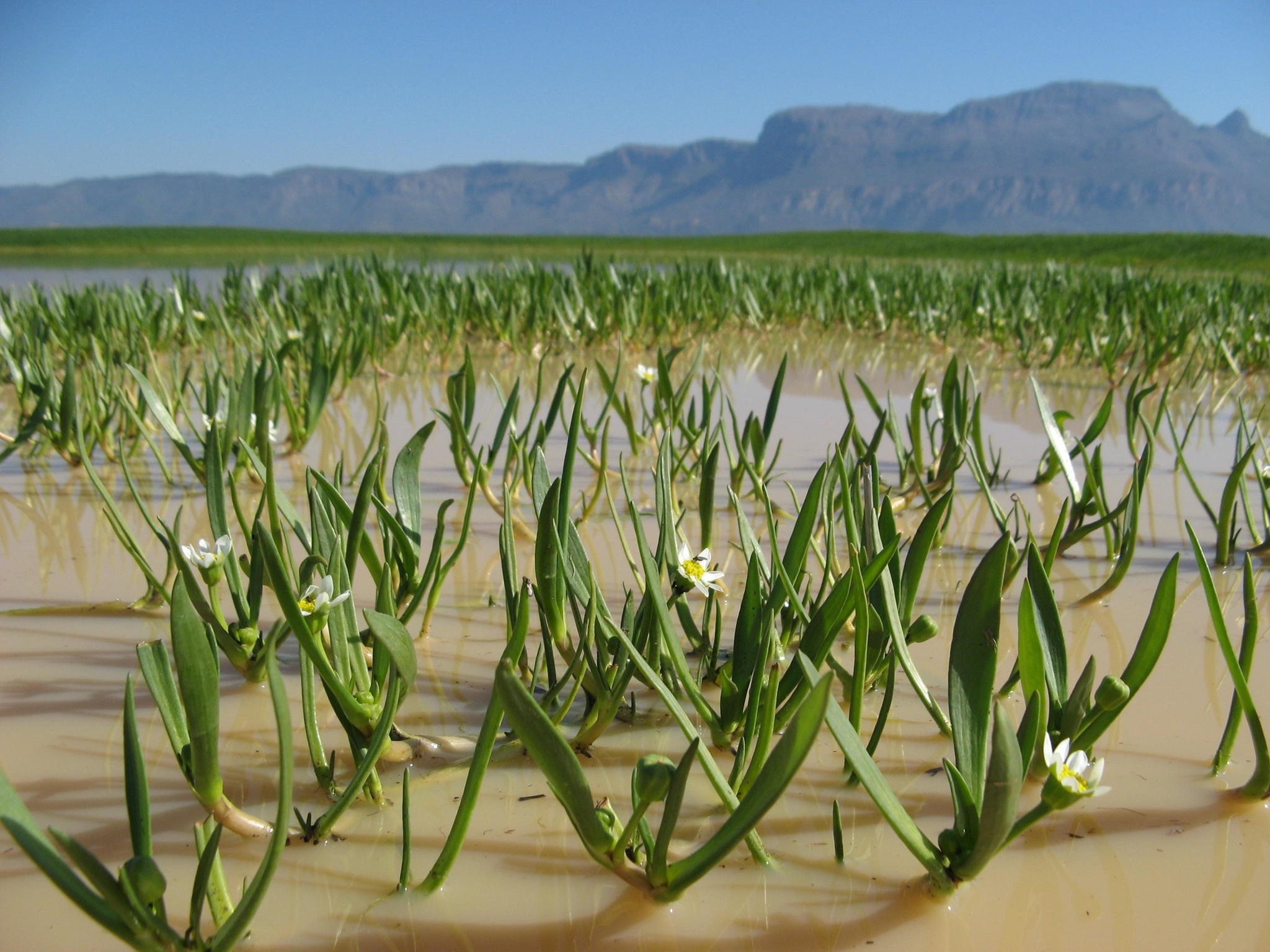

Conservation status
- Critically Endangered (IUCN 3.1)

Scientific classification
- Kingdom: Plantae
- Clade: Embryophytes
- Clade: Tracheophytes
- Clade: Angiosperms
- Clade: Eudicots
- Clade: Asterids
- Order: Asterales
- Family: Asteraceae
- Genus: Senecio
- Species: S. cadiscus

Binomial name
- Senecio cadiscus B.Nord. & Pelser

Synonyms
- Cadiscus aquaticus

= Senecio cadiscus =

Species of flowering plant

Senecio cadiscus is a species of aquatic flowering plant in the aster family, Asteraceae. It is endemic to the Western Cape of South Africa, where it grows in vernal pools. It was at one time classified as Cadiscus aquaticus, the only species in the monotypic genus Cadiscus, but molecular phylogenetic analysis showed that it is nested within Senecio. It is a floating or emergent plant with small narrow leaves and white-rayed flowers. Its populations are small and fragmented, and are declining. The plant is threatened by grazing and trampling by livestock, invasive plants, reclamation of wetlands and eutrophication from fertilizer runoff. The International Union for Conservation of Nature has consequently rated it as "critically endangered".

== Taxonomy ==
This plant was known as Cadiscus aquaticus, the only species in the monotypic genus Cadiscus, until molecular phylogenetic analyses indicated it was clearly nested among the species of Senecio. It was moved there and renamed S. cadiscus in 2009. Some authorities still accept its former name.

== Description ==
This is an aquatic plant that grows in vernal pools. It is floating or emergent and sometimes terrestrial along the pool margins. Young plants are submerged. Flowering occurs in August and September.

The plant has narrow, floating leaves and white ray florets. The fruit is a cypsela with a pappus of coarse bristles and small tufts of hairs that become sticky and slimy when wet. These may be adaptations to zoochory, in which seeds are dispersed by animals, perhaps waterfowl.

== Status ==
The plant is restricted to vernal pool habitat. It is known from a few localities, and has been recently extirpated from a few others. It does not occur in all of the vernal pools that are apparently available to it, and it probably does not have the ability to disperse easily. Populations are thought to have declined over 70% in the last 100 years, and declines are ongoing. Threats to the plant and its vernal pool ecosystem include grazing and trampling by cattle and horses, reclamation of wetlands, use of heavy machinery on the land, invasive species of grasses introduced when livestock feed is discarded in the area, and eutrophication from fertilizer runoff.
