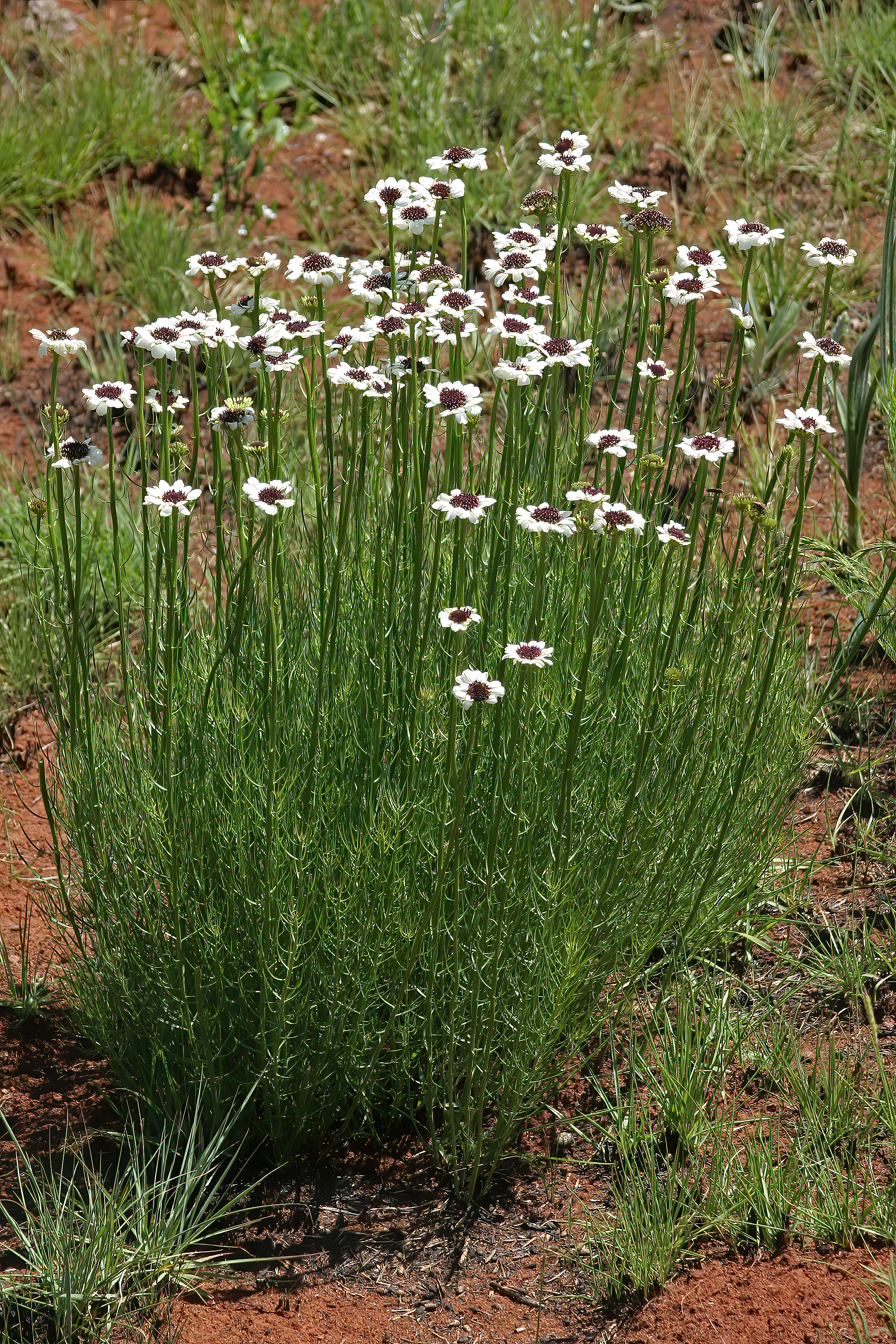
- Callilepis leptophylla

Scientific classification
- Kingdom: Plantae
- Clade: Tracheophytes
- Clade: Angiosperms
- Clade: Eudicots
- Clade: Asterids
- Order: Asterales
- Family: Asteraceae
- Subfamily: Asteroideae
- Tribe: Gnaphalieae
- Genus: Callilepis; DC.

Synonyms
- Zoutpansbergia Hutch.

= Callilepis (plant) =

Genus of flowering plants

Callilepis is a genus of flowering plants in the family Asteraceae. It is native to southern Africa.

== Species ==
As of May 2024, Plants of the World Online accepted 10 species.

- Callilepis caerulea (Hutch.) Leins – ox-eye daisy – Soutpansberg, Limpopo
- Callilepis corymbosa P.P.J.Herman & Koek.
- Callilepis glabra DC.
- Callilepis lancifolia Burtt Davy – Limpopo
- Callilepis laureola DC. – ox-eye daisy, black-eyed susan, marguerite – Limpopo, KwaZulu-Natal, Free State, Swaziland, Cape Province
- Callilepis leptophylla Harv. – wild daisy – Limpopo, KwaZulu-Natal, Swaziland
- Callilepis nepotiana P.P.J.Herman
- Callilepis normae P.P.J.Herman & Koek.
- Callilepis retiefiae P.P.J.Herman
- Callilepis salicifolia Oliv. – Limpopo, KwaZulu-Natal, Swaziland
