= Aphelexis =

Scientific classification
- Kingdom: Plantae
- Clade: Tracheophytes
- Clade: Angiosperms
- Clade: Eudicots
- Clade: Asterids
- Order: Asterales
- Family: Asteraceae
- Genus: Aphelexis; D.Don

Genus of flowering plants

Aphelexis is a genus of flowering plants belonging to the family Asteraceae.

Its native range is Madagascar.

Species:

- Aphelexis adhaerens Bojer ex DC.
- Aphelexis candollei Bojer ex DC.
- Aphelexis hypnoides DC.
- Aphelexis selaginifolia DC.
