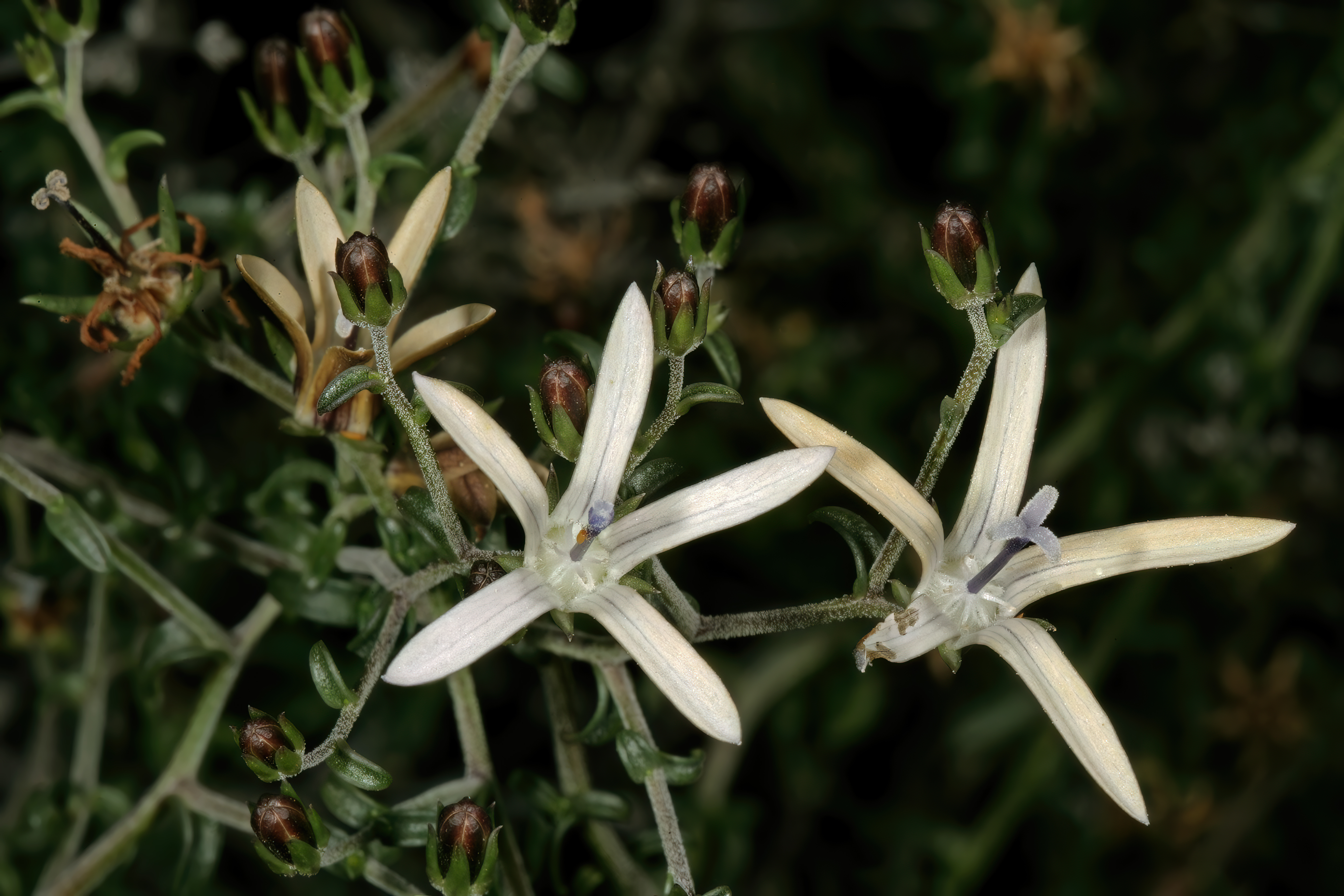

Scientific classification
- Kingdom: Plantae
- Clade: Tracheophytes
- Clade: Angiosperms
- Clade: Eudicots
- Clade: Asterids
- Order: Asterales
- Family: Campanulaceae
- Genus: Wahlenbergia
- Species: W. nodosa

Binomial name
- Wahlenbergia nodosa (H.Buek) Lammers

= Wahlenbergia nodosa =

Species of flowering plant

Wahlenbergia nodosa (known as the Muistepelkaroo) is a herbaceous plant in the family Campanulaceae native to the dry karoo regions of South Africa.

This species is similar to, and often confused with, Wahlenbergia tenella and Wahlenbergia tenerrima.
