= Pentatrichia =

Scientific classification
- Kingdom: Plantae
- Clade: Tracheophytes
- Clade: Angiosperms
- Clade: Eudicots
- Clade: Asterids
- Order: Asterales
- Family: Asteraceae
- Subfamily: Asteroideae
- Tribe: Gnaphalieae
- Genus: Pentatrichia; Klatt

Synonyms
- Anisothrix O.Hoffm. ex Kuntze

Genus of flowering plants

Pentatrichia is a genus of African plants in the tribe Gnaphalieae within the family Asteraceae.

Species accepted by the Plants of the World Online as of April 2023:

- Pentatrichia alata S.Moore - South Africa
- Pentatrichia integra (Compton) Klaassen & N.G.Bergh - South Africa
- Pentatrichia kuntzei (O.Hoffm.) Klaassen & N.G.Bergh - South Africa
- Pentatrichia petrosa Klatt - South Africa
- Pentatrichia rehmii (Merxm.) Merxm. - Namibia
  - Pentatrichia rehmii subsp. avasmontana (Merxm.) Klaassen & Kwembeya
  - Pentatrichia rehmii subsp. rehmii
