= Anderbergia =

Scientific classification
- Kingdom: Plantae
- Clade: Tracheophytes
- Clade: Angiosperms
- Clade: Eudicots
- Clade: Asterids
- Order: Asterales
- Family: Asteraceae
- Subfamily: Asteroideae
- Tribe: Gnaphalieae
- Genus: Anderbergia; B.Nord.

Genus of flowering plants

Anderbergia is a genus of flowering plants in the family Asteraceae described as a genus in 1996.

Species

All the species are native to the Cape Provinces region of South Africa.

- Anderbergia elsiae B.Nord.
- Anderbergia epaleata (Hilliard & B.L.Burtt) B.Nord.
- Anderbergia fallax B.Nord.
- Anderbergia rooibergensis B.Nord.
- Anderbergia ustulata B.Nord.
- Anderbergia vlokii (Hilliard) B.Nord.
