= Campuloclinium =

Scientific classification
- Kingdom: Plantae
- Clade: Tracheophytes
- Clade: Angiosperms
- Clade: Eudicots
- Clade: Asterids
- Order: Asterales
- Family: Asteraceae
- Subfamily: Asteroideae
- Tribe: Eupatorieae
- Genus: Campuloclinium; DC.

Synonyms
- Eupatorium sect. Campuloclinium (DC.) Benth. ex Baker

Genus of flowering plants

Campuloclinium is a genus of flowering plants in the family Asteraceae.

Species

Campuloclinium is native to Mesoamerica and South America.

- Campuloclinium alternifolium Gardner
- Campuloclinium burchellii (Baker) R.M.King & H.Rob.
- Campuloclinium cabralensis H.Rob.
- Campuloclinium campuloclinioides (Baker) R.M.King & H.Rob.
- Campuloclinium chlorolepis (Baker) R.M.King & H.Rob.
- Campuloclinium eiteniorum R.M.King & H.Rob.
- Campuloclinium hatschbachii H.Rob.
- Campuloclinium hickenii (Cabrera & Vittet) R.M.King & H.Rob.
- Campuloclinium hirsutum Gardner
- Campuloclinium irwinii R.M.King & H.Rob.
- Campuloclinium macrocephalum (Less.) DC.
- Campuloclinium megacephalum (Mart. ex Baker) R.M.King & H.Rob.
- Campuloclinium parvulum (Glaz. ex Glaz.) R.M.King & H.Rob.
- Campuloclinium purpurascens (Sch.Bip. ex Baker) R.M.King & H.Rob.
- Campuloclinium riedelii (Baker) R.M.King & H.Rob.
- Campuloclinium tubaraoense (Hieron.) R.M.King & H.Rob.
