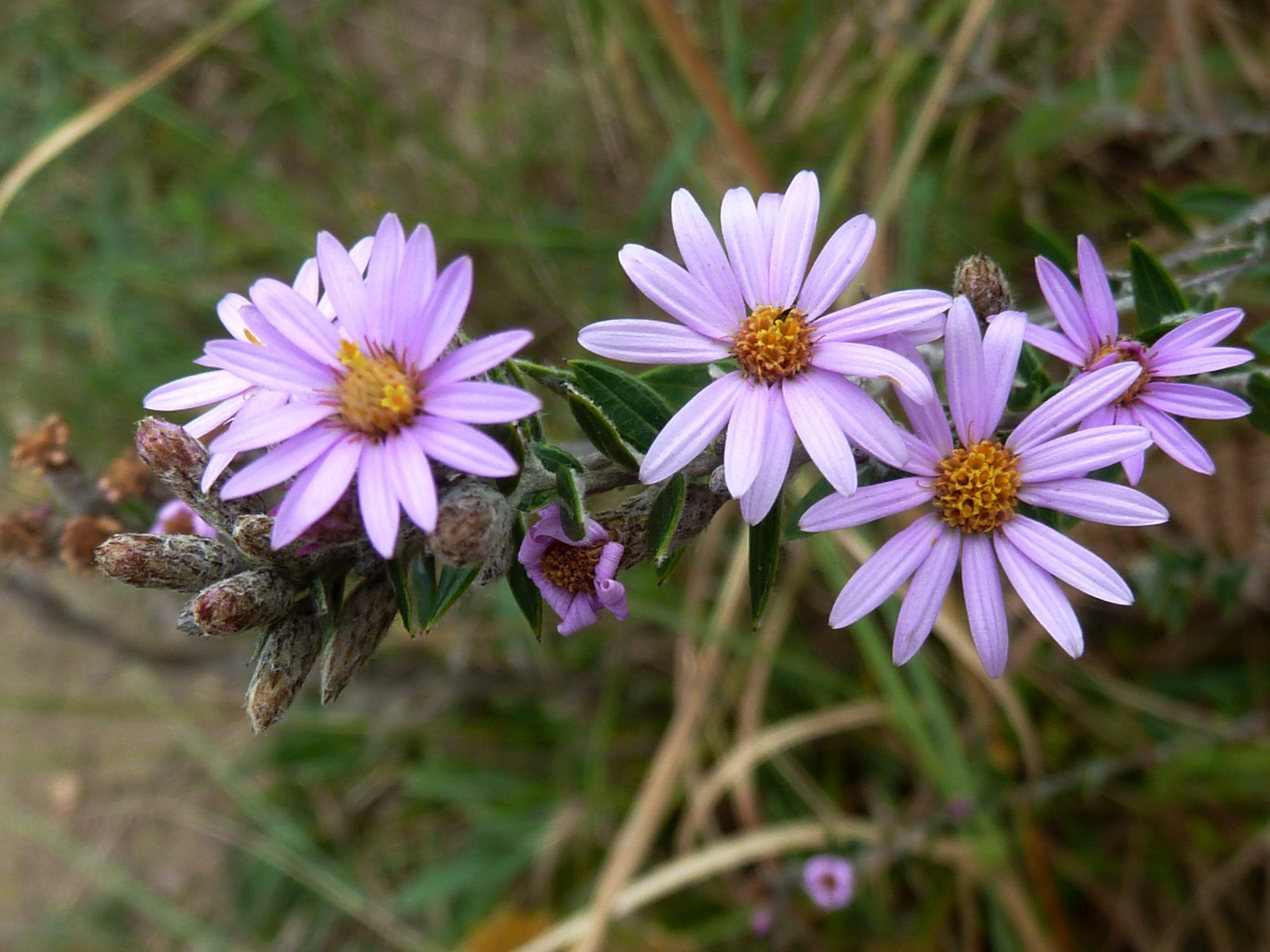
- A. phylicoides

Scientific classification
- Kingdom: Plantae
- Clade: Embryophytes
- Clade: Tracheophytes
- Clade: Angiosperms
- Clade: Eudicots
- Clade: Asterids
- Order: Asterales
- Family: Asteraceae
- Subfamily: Asteroideae
- Tribe: Gnaphalieae
- Genus: Athrixia; Ker Gawl.

Species
- 15; see text

= Athrixia =

Genus of flowering plants

Athrixia is a genus of flowering plants in the family Asteraceae. It includes 15 species of perennial herbs or shrubs native to eastern and southern Africa, ranging from Ethiopia to South Africa including Madagascar.

15 species are accepted:

- Athrixia angustissima DC.
- Athrixia arachnoidea J.M.Wood & M.S.Evans ex J.M.Wood
- Athrixia capensis Ker Gawl.
- Athrixia citrina
- Athrixia crinita (L.) Druce
- Athrixia debilis DC.
- Athrixia elata Sond.
- Athrixia fontana MacOwan
- Athrixia fontinalis Wild
- Athrixia gerrardii Harv.
- Athrixia heterophylla (Thunb.) Less.
- Athrixia nyassana S.Moore
- Athrixia oblonga S.Moore
- Athrixia phylicoides DC.
- Athrixia rosmarinifolia (Sch.Bip. ex Walp.) Oliv. & Hiern
- Athrixia subsimplex Brenan
