= Grammatotheca =

Scientific classification
- Kingdom: Plantae
- Clade: Tracheophytes
- Clade: Angiosperms
- Clade: Eudicots
- Clade: Asterids
- Order: Asterales
- Family: Campanulaceae
- Subfamily: Lobelioideae
- Genus: Grammatotheca; C.Presl
- Species: G. bergiana

Binomial name
- Grammatotheca bergiana (Cham.) C.Presl

Synonyms
- Lobelia bergiana Cham.; Clintonia bergiana (Cham.) G.Don; Grammatotheca erinoides var. thunbergiana Sond. in W.H.Harvey; Dortmanna bergiana (Cham.) Kuntze; Grammatotheca dregeana C.Presl; Grammatotheca eckloniana C.Presl; Grammatotheca meyeriana C.Presl; Grammatotheca mundtiana C.Presl; Lobelia amplexicaulis de Vriese in J.G.C.Lehmann; Lobelia macrocarpa de Vriese in J.G.C.Lehmann; Lobelia macrocarpa var. genistoides de Vriese in J.G.C.Lehmann; Lobelia stenotheca F.Muell.; Grammatotheca erinoides var. dregeana (C.Presl) Sond. in W.H.Harvey; Grammatotheca erinoides var. eckloniana (C.Presl) E.Wimm.; Grammatotheca erinoides var. pedunculata E.Wimm.; Grammatotheca bergiana var. eckloniana (C.Presl) E.Wimm. in H.G.A.Engler; Grammatotheca bergiana var. foliosa E.Wimm. in H.G.A.Engler; Grammatotheca bergiana var. pedunculata (E.Wimm.) E.Wimm. in H.G.A.Engler

Genus of flowering plants

Grammatotheca is a genus of plants in the Campanulaceae. It has only one known species, Grammatotheca bergiana, a subshrub native to the Cape Provinces and KwaZulu-Natal of South Africa, but naturalized in Western Australia.
