= Lepidostephium =

Scientific classification
- Kingdom: Plantae
- Clade: Tracheophytes
- Clade: Angiosperms
- Clade: Eudicots
- Clade: Asterids
- Order: Asterales
- Family: Asteraceae
- Subfamily: Asteroideae
- Tribe: Gnaphalieae
- Genus: Lepidostephium; Oliv.

Genus of flowering plants

Lepidostephium is a genus of South African flowering plants in the family Asteraceae. It is native to the Cape Provinces and KwaZulu-Natal.

Species

- Lepidostephium asteroides (Bolus & Schltr.) Kroner
- Lepidostephium denticulatum Oliv.
