= Disparago =

Scientific classification
- Kingdom: Plantae
- Clade: Embryophytes
- Clade: Tracheophytes
- Clade: Angiosperms
- Clade: Eudicots
- Clade: Asterids
- Order: Asterales
- Family: Asteraceae
- Subfamily: Asteroideae
- Tribe: Gnaphalieae
- Genus: Disparago; Gaertn.

Genus of flowering plants

Disparago is a genus of flowering plants in the family Asteraceae.

Species

All the species are endemic to the Cape Province region of South Africa

- Disparago anomala Schltr. ex Levyns
- Disparago ericoides (P.J.Bergius) Gaertn.
- Disparago kraussii Sch.Bip.
- Disparago laxifolia DC.
