= Hydroidea =

Scientific classification
- Kingdom: Plantae
- Clade: Embryophytes
- Clade: Tracheophytes
- Clade: Angiosperms
- Clade: Eudicots
- Clade: Asterids
- Order: Asterales
- Family: Asteraceae
- Subfamily: Asteroideae
- Tribe: Gnaphalieae
- Genus: Hydroidea; P.O.Karis
- Species: H. elsiae

Binomial name
- Hydroidea elsiae (Hilliard) P.O.Karis

Synonyms
- Atrichantha elsiae Hilliard

Genus of flowering plants

Hydroidea is a genus of flowering plants in the family Asteraceae.

Species

There is only one known species, Hydroidea elsiae, native to the Cape Provinces of South Africa.
