= List of Lobelia species =

The following is a list of Lobelia species accepted by the Plants of the World Online as of January 2021:

== A ==
- Lobelia aberdarica R.E.Fr. & T.C.E.Fr.
- Lobelia acrochila (E.Wimm.) E.B.Knox
- Lobelia acuminata Sw.
- Lobelia acutidens Hook.f.
- Lobelia adnexa E.Wimm.
- Lobelia agrestis E.Wimm.
- Lobelia aguana E.Wimm.
- Lobelia alpina Vell.
- Lobelia alsinoides Lam.
- Lobelia alticaulis Proctor
- Lobelia amoena Michx.
- Lobelia anatina E.Wimm.
- Lobelia anceps L.f.
- Lobelia andrewsii Lammers
- Lobelia angulata G.Forst.
- Lobelia apalachicolensis D.D.Spauld., Barger & H.E.Horne
- Lobelia appendiculata A.DC.
- Lobelia aquaemontis E.Wimm.
- Lobelia aquatica Cham.
- Lobelia archboldiana (Merr. & L.M.Perry) Moeliono
- Lobelia archeri N.G.Walsh
- Lobelia ardisiandroides Schltr.
- Lobelia arnhemiaca E.Wimm.
- Lobelia assurgens L.
- Lobelia aurita (Brandegee) T.J.Ayers
- Lobelia australiensis Lammers
- Lobelia ayersiae Rzed.

== B ==
- Lobelia bambuseti R.E.Fr. & T.C.E.Fr.
- Lobelia barkerae E.Wimm.
- Lobelia barnsii Exell
- Lobelia baumannii Engl.
- Lobelia beaugleholei Albr.
- Lobelia benthamii F.Muell.
- Lobelia bequaertii De Wild.
- Lobelia berlandieri A.DC.
- Lobelia biflora Rzed.
- Lobelia bipinnatifida Rzed.
- Lobelia blantyrensis E.Wimm.
- Lobelia boivinii Sond.
- Lobelia boninensis Koidz.
- Lobelia borneensis (Hemsl.) Moeliono
- Lobelia boykinii Torr. & Gray ex A.DC.
- Lobelia brachyantha Merr. & L.M.Perry
- Lobelia brasiliensis A.O.S.Vieira & G.J.Sheph.
- Lobelia brevifolia Nutt. ex A.DC.
- Lobelia bridgesii Hook. & Arn.
- Lobelia brigittalis E.H.L.Krause
- Lobelia browniana Schult. (Note: Lobelia browniana Schult. is listed as a synonym of Lobelia gibbosa Labill. by Plants of the World Online, but as an accepted species at the Australian Plant Census.)
- Lobelia bryoides Willd. ex Schult.
- Lobelia bryophila E.Wimm.
- Lobelia burttii E.A.Bruce

== C ==
- Lobelia cacuminis Britton & P.Wilson
- Lobelia caeciliae E.Wimm.
- Lobelia caerulea Sims
- Lobelia caledoniana C.D.Adams
- Lobelia calochlamys (Donn.Sm.) Wilbur
- Lobelia camporum Pohl
- Lobelia canbyi A.Gray
- Lobelia capillifolia (C.Presl) A.DC.
- Lobelia cardinalis L.
- Lobelia carens Heenan
- Lobelia caudata (Griseb.) Urb.
- Lobelia cavaleriei H.Lév.
- Lobelia chamaedryfolia (C.Presl) A.DC.
- Lobelia chamaepitys Lam.
- Lobelia cheiranthus L.
- Lobelia cheranganiensis Thulin
- Lobelia chevalieri Danguy
- Lobelia chinensis Lour.
- Lobelia chireensis A.Rich.
- Lobelia christii Urb.
- Lobelia ciliata A.Spreng. ex C.Presl
- Lobelia circaeoides (C.Presl) A.DC.
- Lobelia cirsiifolia Lam.
- Lobelia cladlomesa Raf.
- Lobelia clavata E.Wimm.
- Lobelia claviflora Albr. & R.W.Jobson
- Lobelia cleistogamoides N.G.Walsh & Albr.
- Lobelia cliffortiana L.
- Lobelia cobaltica S.Moore
- Lobelia cochleariifolia Diels
- Lobelia collina Kunth
- Lobelia columnaris Hook.f.
- Lobelia comosa L.
- Lobelia comptonii E.Wimm.
- Lobelia concolor R.Br.
- Lobelia conferta Merr. & L.M.Perry
- Lobelia conglobata Lam.
- Lobelia cordifolia Hook. & Arn.
- Lobelia corniculata Thulin
- Lobelia coronopifolia L.
- Lobelia corymbiformis Rzed.
- Lobelia cubana Urb.
- Lobelia cuneifolia Link & Otto
- Lobelia cyanea E.Wimm.
- Lobelia cymbalarioides Engl.
- Lobelia cyphioides Harv.

== D ==
- Lobelia darlingensis (E.Wimm.) Albr.
- Lobelia dasyphylla E.Wimm.
- Lobelia davidii Franch.
- Lobelia deckenii (Asch.) Hemsl.
- Lobelia decurrens Cav.
- Lobelia decurrentifolia (Kuntze) K.Schum.
- Lobelia deleiensis C.E.C.Fisch.
- Lobelia dentata Cav.
- Lobelia diastateoides McVaugh
- Lobelia diazlunae Rzed. & Calderón
- Lobelia dichroma Schltr.
- Lobelia dielsiana E.Wimm.
- Lobelia digitalifolia (Griseb.) Urb.
- Lobelia dioica R.Br.
- Lobelia dissecta M.B.Moss
- Lobelia divaricata Hook. & Arn.
- Lobelia divergens Rzed.
- Lobelia diversifolia Willd. ex Schult.
- Lobelia djurensis Engl. & Diels
- Lobelia dodiana E.Wimm.
- Lobelia donanensis P.Royen
- Lobelia dopatrioides Kurz
- Lobelia dortmanna L.
- Lobelia douglasiana F.M.Bailey (Note: Lobelia douglasiana F.M.Bailey is listed as a synonym of Lobelia stenophylla Benth. by Plants of the World Online, but as an accepted species at the Australian Plant Census.)
- Lobelia dregeana (C.Presl) A.DC.
- Lobelia dressleri Wilbur
- Lobelia drungjiangensis D.Y.Hong
- Lobelia dunbariae Rock
- Lobelia duriprati T.C.E.Fr.

== E ==
- Lobelia ehrenbergii Vatke
- Lobelia ekmanii Urb.
- Lobelia elongata Small
- Lobelia endlichii (E.Wimm.) T.J.Ayers
- Lobelia ensiformis Vell.
- Lobelia erectiuscula H.Hara
- Lobelia erlangeriana Engl.
- Lobelia erinus L.
- Lobelia eryliae C.E.C.Fisch.
- Lobelia esquirolii H.Lév.
- Lobelia eurostos Voigt
- Lobelia eurypoda E.Wimm.
- Lobelia exaltata Pohl
- Lobelia excelsa Bonpl.
- Lobelia exilis Hochst. ex A.Rich.

== F ==
- Lobelia fangiana (E.Wimm.) S.Y.Hu
- Lobelia fastigiata Kunth
- Lobelia fatiscens Heenan
- Lobelia fawcettii Urb.
- Lobelia feayana A.Gray
- Lobelia fenestralis Cav.
- Lobelia fenshamii N.G.Walsh & Albr.
- Lobelia fervens Thunb.
- Lobelia filicaulis (C.Presl) Schönland
- Lobelia filiformis Lam.
- Lobelia filipes E.Wimm.
- Lobelia fissiflora N.G.Walsh
- Lobelia fistulosa Vell.
- Lobelia flaccida (C.Presl) A.DC.
- Lobelia flaccidifolia Small
- Lobelia flexicaulis Rzed. & Calderón
- Lobelia flexuosa (C.Presl) A.DC.
- Lobelia floridana Chapm.
- Lobelia foliiformis T.J.Zhang & D.Y.Hong
- Lobelia fontana Albr. & N.G.Walsh
- Lobelia fugax Heenan, Courtney & P.N.Johnson

== G ==
- Lobelia galpinii Schltr.
- Lobelia gaoligongshanica D.Y.Hong
- Lobelia gattingeri A.Gray
- Lobelia gaudichaudii A.DC.
- Lobelia gelida F.Muell.
- Lobelia georgiana McVaugh
- Lobelia ghiesbreghtii Decne.
- Lobelia gibbosa Labill.
- Lobelia giberroa Hemsl.
- Lobelia gilgii Engl.
- Lobelia gilletii De Wild.
- Lobelia glaberrima Heenan
- Lobelia gladiaria McVaugh
- Lobelia glandulosa Walter
- Lobelia glaucescens E.Wimm.
- Lobelia glazioviana Zahlbr.
- Lobelia gloria-montis Rock
- Lobelia goetzei Diels
- Lobelia goldmanii (Fernald) T.J.Ayers
- Lobelia gouldii W.Fitzg.
- Lobelia gracillima Welw. ex Hiern
- Lobelia grandifolia Britton
- Lobelia graniticola E.Wimm.
- Lobelia grayana E.Wimm.
- Lobelia gregoriana Baker f.
- Lobelia griffithii Hook.f. & Thomson
- Lobelia gruina Cav.
- Lobelia guatemalensis (B.L.Rob. ex Donn.Sm.) Wilbur
- Lobelia guerrerensis Eakes & Lammers
- Lobelia guzmanii Rzed.
- Lobelia gypsophila T.J.Ayers

== H ==
- Lobelia hainanensis E.Wimm.
- Lobelia harrisii Urb.
- Lobelia hartlaubii Buchenau
- Lobelia hartwegii Benth. ex A.DC.
- Lobelia hassleri Zahlbr.
- Lobelia hederacea Cham.
- Lobelia henodon E.Wimm.
- Lobelia henricksonii M.C.Johnst.
- Lobelia hereroensis Schinz
- Lobelia heteroclita McVaugh
- Lobelia heterophylla Labill.
- Lobelia heyneana Schult.
- Lobelia hilaireana (Kanitz) E.Wimm.
- Lobelia hillebrandii Rock
- Lobelia hintoniorum B.L.Turner
- Lobelia hirtipes E.Wimm.
- Lobelia holotricha E.Wimm.
- Lobelia holstii Engl.
- Lobelia homophylla E.Wimm.
- Lobelia hongiana Q.F.Wang & G.W.Hu
- Lobelia horombensis E.Wimm.
- Lobelia hotteana Judd & Skean
- Lobelia humistrata F.Muell. ex Benth.
- Lobelia humpatensis E.Wimm.
- Lobelia hypnodes E.Wimm. ex McVaugh
- Lobelia hypoleuca Hillebr.

== I ==
- Lobelia illota McVaugh
- Lobelia imberbis (Griseb.) Urb.
- Lobelia imperialis E.Wimm.
- Lobelia inconspicua A.Rich.
- Lobelia inflata L.
- Lobelia innominata Rendle
- Lobelia intercedens (E.Wimm.) Thulin
- Lobelia irasuensis Planch. & Oerst.
- Lobelia irrigua R.Br.
- Lobelia iteophylla C.Y.Wu

== J ==
- Lobelia jaliscensis McVaugh
- Lobelia jasionoides (A.DC.) E.Wimm.

== K ==
- Lobelia kalmii L.
- Lobelia kalobaensis E.Wimm. ex Thulin
- Lobelia × kauaensis (A.Gray) A.Heller
- Lobelia kirkii R.E.Fr.
- Lobelia knoblochii T.J.Ayers
- Lobelia koolauensis (Hosaka & Fosberg) Lammers
- Lobelia kraussii Graham
- Lobelia kundelungensis Thulin

== L ==
- Lobelia lammersiana P.Biju, Josekutty & Augustine
- Lobelia langeana Dusén
- Lobelia lasiocalycina E.Wimm.
- Lobelia laurentioides Schltr.
- Lobelia laxa MacOwan
- Lobelia laxiflora Kunth
- Lobelia leichhardii E.Wimm.
- Lobelia lepida E.Wimm.
- Lobelia leschenaultiana (C.Presl) Skottsb.
- Lobelia leucotos Albr.
- Lobelia limosa (Adamson) E.Wimm.
- Lobelia linarioides (C.Presl) A.DC.
- Lobelia lindblomii Mildbr.
- Lobelia linearis Thunb.
- Lobelia lingulata E.Wimm.
- Lobelia lisowskii Thulin
- Lobelia lithophila Senterre & Cast.-Campos
- Lobelia livingstoniana R.E.Fr.
- Lobelia lobata E.Wimm.
- Lobelia longicaulis Brandegee
- Lobelia longipedicellata C.E.C.Fisch.
- Lobelia longisepala Engl.
- Lobelia loochooensis Koidz.
- Lobelia lucayana Britton & Millsp.
- Lobelia lukwangulensis Engl.
- Lobelia luruniensis E.Wimm.
- Lobelia luzoniensis (Pers.) Merr.

== M ==
- Lobelia macdonaldii B.L.Turner
- Lobelia macrocentron (Benth.) T.J.Ayers
- Lobelia macrodon (Hook.f.) Lammers
- Lobelia malowensis E.Wimm.
- Lobelia margarita E.Wimm.
- Lobelia martagon (Griseb.) Hitchc.
- Lobelia mcvaughii T.J.Ayers
- Lobelia melliana E.Wimm.
- Lobelia membranacea R.Br.
- Lobelia mexicana E.Wimm.
- Lobelia mezlerioides E.Wimm.
- Lobelia mildbraedii Engl.
- Lobelia minutula Engl.
- Lobelia modesta Wedd.
- Lobelia molleri Henriq.
- Lobelia monostachya (Rock) Lammers
- Lobelia montana Reinw. ex Blume
- Lobelia morogoroensis E.B.Knox & Pócs
- Lobelia muscoides Cham.

== N ==
- Lobelia nana Kunth
- Lobelia neglecta Schult.
- Lobelia neumannii T.C.E.Fr.
- Lobelia nicotianifolia Roth
- Lobelia niihauensis H.St.John
- Lobelia nubicola McVaugh
- Lobelia nubigena J.Anthony
- Lobelia nugax E.Wimm.
- Lobelia nummularia Lam.
- Lobelia nummularioides Cham.
- Lobelia nuttallii Schult.

== O ==
- Lobelia oahuensis Rock
- Lobelia oaxacana Rzed.
- Lobelia obconica E.Wimm.
- Lobelia occidentalis McVaugh & Huft
- Lobelia oligophylla (Wedd.) Lammers
- Lobelia oreas E.Wimm.
- Lobelia organensis Gardner
- Lobelia orientalis Rzed. & Calderón
- Lobelia origenes Lammers
- Lobelia ovina E.Wimm.
- Lobelia oxyphylla Urb.

== P ==
- Lobelia paludigena Thulin
- Lobelia paludosa Nutt.
- Lobelia paranaensis R.Braga
- Lobelia parva Badré & Cadet
- Lobelia parvidentata L.O.Williams
- Lobelia parvisepala E.Wimm.
- Lobelia patula L.f.
- Lobelia pedunculata R.Br.
- Lobelia pentheri E.Wimm.
- Lobelia perpusilla Hook.f.
- Lobelia perrieri E.Wimm.
- Lobelia persicifolia Lam.
- Lobelia petiolata Huamán
- Lobelia philippinensis Skottsb.
- Lobelia physaloides A.Cunn.
- Lobelia pinifolia L.
- Lobelia platycalyx (F.Muell.) F.Muell.
- Lobelia plebeia E.Wimm.
- Lobelia pleotricha Diels
- Lobelia poetica E.Wimm.
- Lobelia polyphylla Hook. & Arn.
- Lobelia porphyrea Rzed. & Calderón
- Lobelia portoricensis (Vatke) Urb.
- Lobelia pratiana Gaudich. ex Lammers
- Lobelia pratioides Benth.
- Lobelia preslii A.DC.
- Lobelia pringlei S.Watson
- Lobelia proctorii Argent & P.Wilkie
- Lobelia psilostoma E.Wimm.
- Lobelia pteropoda (C.Presl) A.DC.
- Lobelia puberula Michx.
- Lobelia pubescens Aiton
- Lobelia pulchella Vatke
- Lobelia purpurascens R.Br.
- Lobelia purpusii Brandegee
- Lobelia pyramidalis Wall.

== Q ==
- Lobelia quadrangularis R.Br.
- Lobelia quadrisepala (R.D.Good) E.Wimm.
- Lobelia quarreana E.Wimm.
- Lobelia quiexobrae Rzed.

== R ==
- Lobelia rarifolia E.Wimm.
- Lobelia reinekeana E.Wimm.
- Lobelia reinwardtiana (C.Presl) A.DC.
- Lobelia remyi Rock
- Lobelia reniformis Cham.
- Lobelia reptans W.J.de Wilde & Duyfjes
- Lobelia reverchonii B.L.Turner
- Lobelia rhombifolia de Vriese
- Lobelia rhynchopetalum Hemsl.
- Lobelia rhytidosperma Benth.
- Lobelia ritabeaniana E.B.Knox
- Lobelia rivalis E.Wimm.
- Lobelia robusta Graham
- Lobelia × rogersii Bowden
- Lobelia rosalindae Rzed.
- Lobelia rosea Wall.
- Lobelia rotundifolia Juss. ex A.DC.
- Lobelia roughii Hook.f.
- Lobelia rubescens De Wild.
- Lobelia rzedowskii Art.Castro & I.Gut.

== S ==
- Lobelia salicina Lam.
- Lobelia sancta Thulin
- Lobelia santa-luciae Rendle
- Lobelia santos-limae Brade
- Lobelia sapinii De Wild.
- Lobelia sartorii Vatke
- Lobelia saturninoi Art.Castro & I.Gut.
- Lobelia scaevolifolia Roxb.
- Lobelia scebelii Chiov.
- Lobelia schimperi Hochst. ex A.Rich.
- Lobelia scrobiculata E.Wimm.
- Lobelia seguinii H.Lév. & Vaniot
- Lobelia serpens Lam.
- Lobelia serratifolia W.J.de Wilde & Duyfjes
- Lobelia sessilifolia Lamb.
- Lobelia setacea Thunb.
- Lobelia setulosa E.Wimm.
- Lobelia shaferi Urb.
- Lobelia simplicicaulis R.Br.
- Lobelia simulans N.G.Walsh
- Lobelia sinaloae Sprague
- Lobelia siphilitica L.
- Lobelia solaris E.Wimm.
- Lobelia sonderiana (Kuntze) Lammers
- Lobelia spathopetala Diels
- Lobelia × speciosa Sweet
- Lobelia spicata Lam.
- Lobelia standleyi McVaugh
- Lobelia stellfeldii R.Braga
- Lobelia stenocarpa E.Wimm.
- Lobelia stenodonta (Fernald) McVaugh
- Lobelia stenophylla Benth.
- Lobelia stenosiphon (Adamson) E.Wimm.
- Lobelia stolonifera Donn.Sm.
- Lobelia stricklandiae Gilliland
- Lobelia stricta Sw.
- Lobelia stuhlmannii Schweinf. ex Stuhlmann
- Lobelia sublibera S.Watson
- Lobelia subnuda Benth.
- Lobelia subpubera Wedd.
- Lobelia subscaposa Rzed.
- Lobelia sulawesiensis Lammers
- Lobelia sumatrana Merr.
- Lobelia surrepens Hook.f.
- Lobelia sutherlandii E.Wimm.

== T ==
- Lobelia taliensis Diels
- Lobelia tarsophora Seaton ex Greenm.
- Lobelia tatea (E.Wimm.) E.Wimm.
- Lobelia telekii Schweinf.
- Lobelia telephioides (C.Presl) A.DC.
- Lobelia tenera Kunth
- Lobelia tenuior R.Br.
- Lobelia terminalis C.B.Clarke
- Lobelia thapsoidea Schott ex Pohl
- Lobelia thermalis Thunb.
- Lobelia thorelii E.Wimm.
- Lobelia thuliniana E.B.Knox
- Lobelia tomentosa L.f.
- Lobelia trigonocaulis F.Muell.
- Lobelia tripartita Thulin
- Lobelia trullifolia Hemsl.
- Lobelia tupa L.

== U ==
- Lobelia udzungwensis Thulin
- Lobelia uliginosa E.Wimm.
- Lobelia umbellifera McVaugh
- Lobelia urens L.

== V ==
- Lobelia vagans Balf.f.
- Lobelia valida L.Bolus
- Lobelia vanreenensis (Kuntze) K.Schum.
- Lobelia victoriensis P.Royen
- Lobelia villaregalis T.J.Ayers
- Lobelia villosa (Rock) H.St.John & Hosaka
- Lobelia viridiflora McVaugh
- Lobelia vivaldii Lammers & Proctor
- Lobelia volcanica T.J.Ayers

== W ==
- Lobelia wahiawa Lammers
- Lobelia walkeri (C.B.Clarke) W.J.de Wilde & Duyfjes
- Lobelia welwitschii Engl. & Diels
- Lobelia wilmsiana Diels
- Lobelia winfridae Diels (Note: Lobelia winifrediae Diels, listed at Plants of the World Online is listed as an orthographical variant of Lobelia winfridae Diels by the Australian Plant Census.)
- Lobelia wollastonii Baker f.

== X ==
- Lobelia xalapensis Kunth
- Lobelia xongorolana E.Wimm.

== Y ==
- Lobelia yucatana E.Wimm.
- Lobelia yuccoides Hillebr.

== Z ==
- Lobelia zelayensis Wilbur
- Lobelia zeylanica L.
- Lobelia zwartkopensis E.Wimm.
