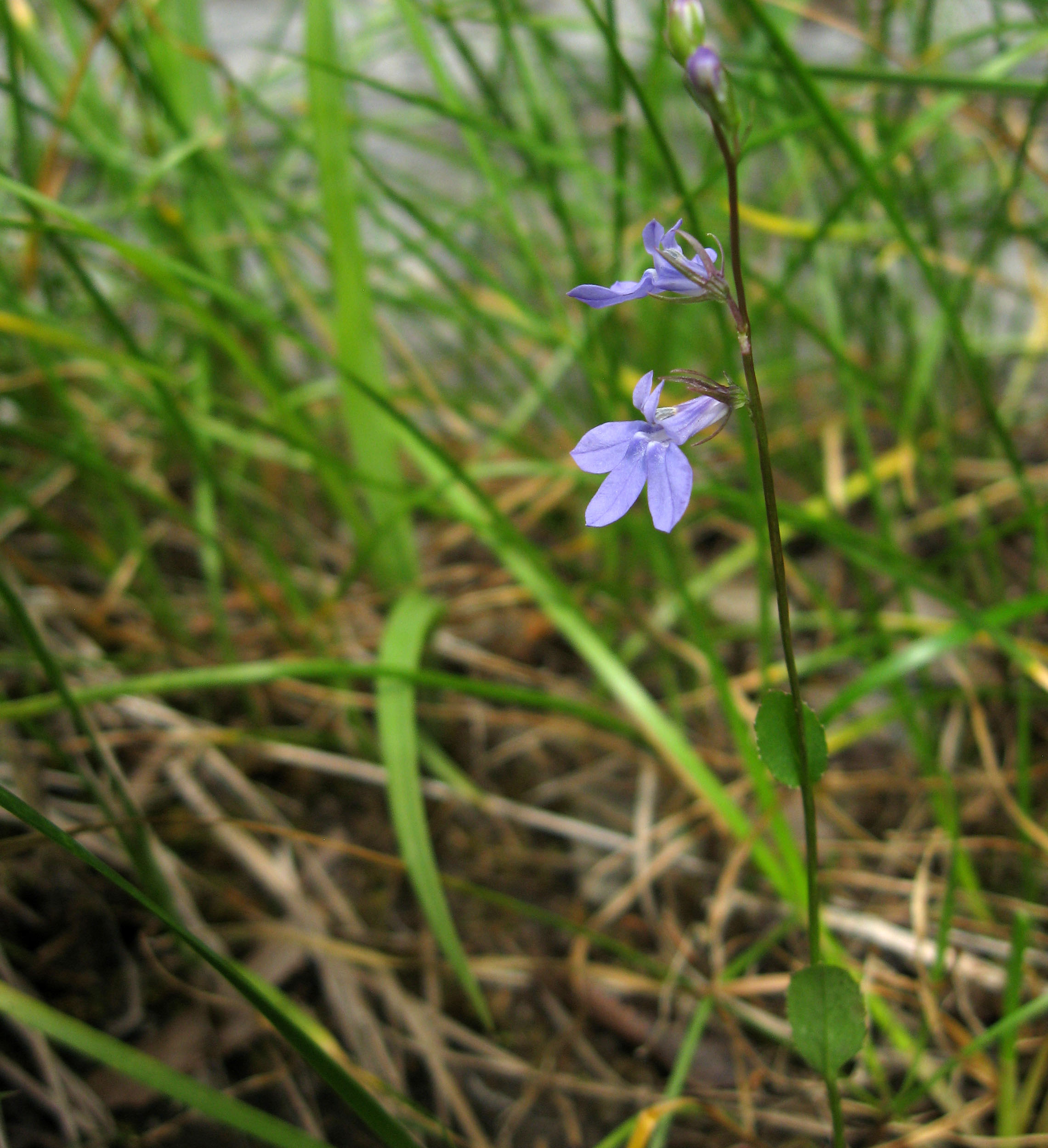

Scientific classification
- Kingdom: Plantae
- Clade: Tracheophytes
- Clade: Angiosperms
- Clade: Eudicots
- Clade: Asterids
- Order: Asterales
- Family: Campanulaceae
- Genus: Lobelia
- Species: L. gattingeri

Binomial name
- Lobelia gattingeri A.Gray

= Lobelia gattingeri =

Species of flowering plant

Lobelia gattingeri is a species of flowering plant in the bellflower family commonly called Gattinger's lobelia. It is endemic to calcareous cedar glades and barrens. It has a small range, native only to middle Tennessee and one site in the Pennyroyal Plain of Kentucky.

It is an annual species, with seeds germinating in either the autumn or spring. It produces a spike of blue flowers in the spring, and during wet summers it can remain in bloom until October.

It is sometimes considered a variety of Lobelia appendiculata, which is found further to the south and west. It is distinguished by its smaller size and more glabrous calyx.
