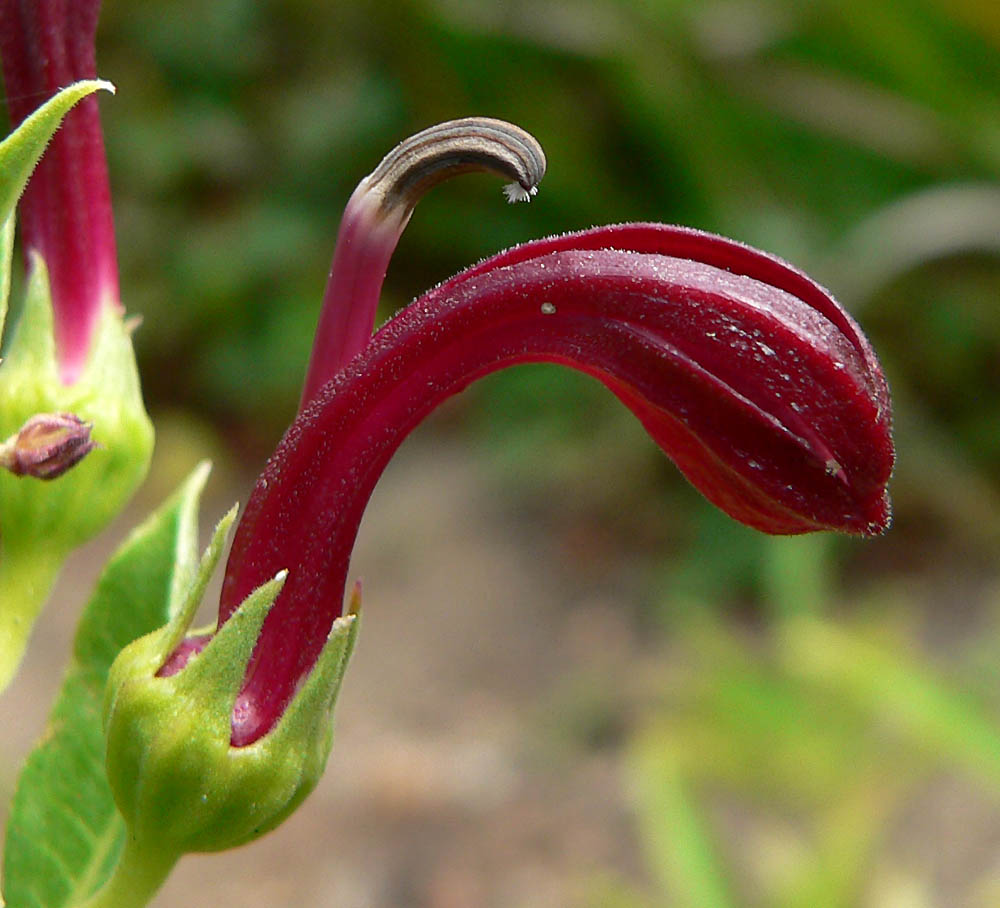
- Close-up of flower
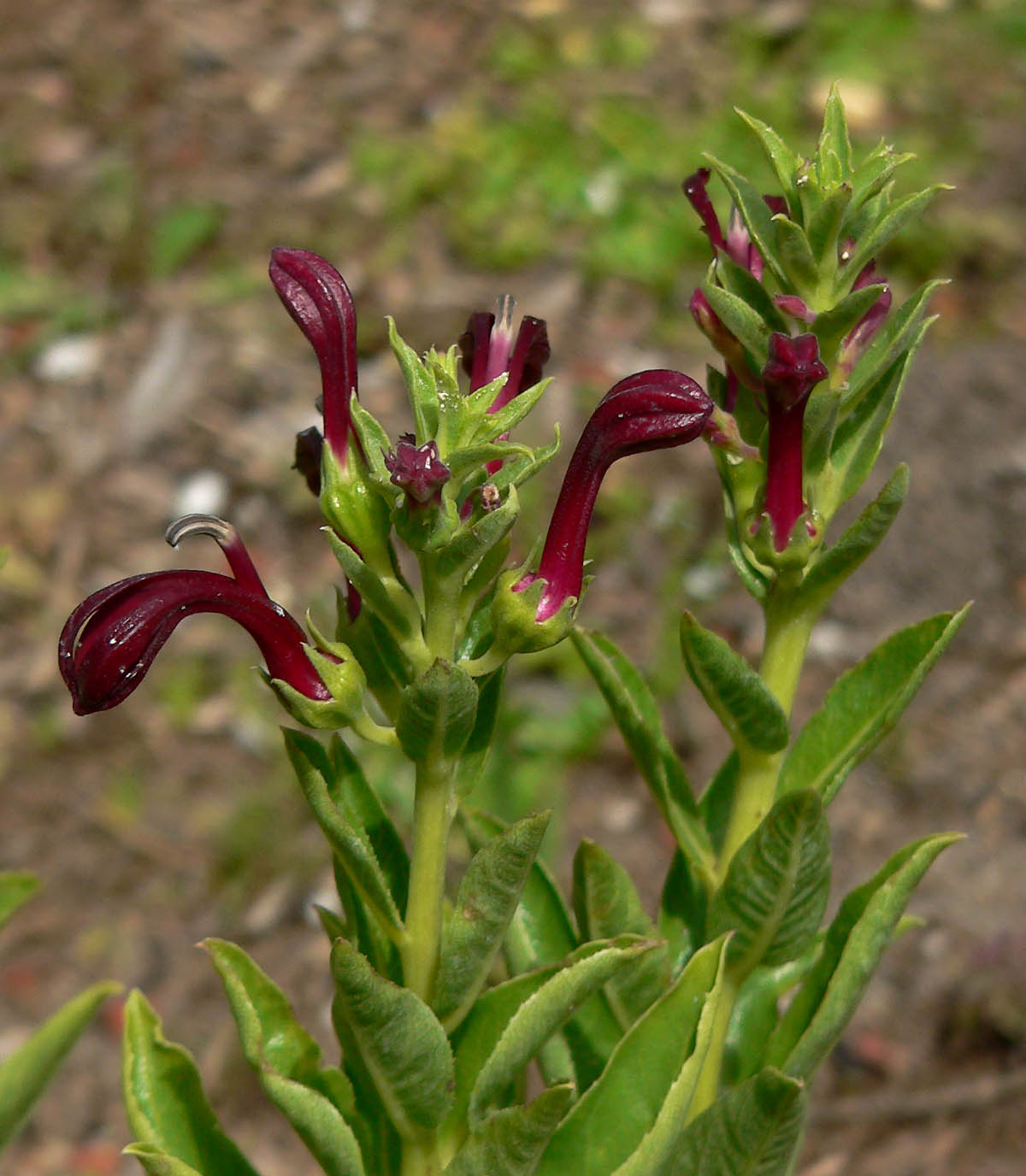
- At the San Francisco Botanical Garden

Scientific classification
- Kingdom: Plantae
- Clade: Embryophytes
- Clade: Tracheophytes
- Clade: Spermatophytes
- Clade: Angiosperms
- Clade: Eudicots
- Clade: Asterids
- Order: Asterales
- Family: Campanulaceae
- Genus: Lobelia
- Species: L. polyphylla

Binomial name
- Lobelia polyphylla Hook. & Arn.

Synonyms
- List: Dortmanna besseriana (C.Presl) Kuntze; Dortmanna bracteosa (C.Presl) Kuntze; Dortmanna hyssopifolia (C.Presl) Kuntze; Dortmanna polyphylla (Hook. & Arn.) Kuntze; Dortmanna purpurea (Lindl.) Kuntze; Dortmanna subdentata (C.Presl) Kuntze; Lobelia axilliflora (Phil.) Reiche; Lobelia hyssopifolia (C.Presl) Gay; Lobelia ovata Reiche; Lobelia polyphylla var. angustifolia (Hook. & Arn. ex A.DC.) Heynh.; Lobelia polyphylla var. besseriana (C.Presl) Reiche; Lobelia polyphylla var. bracteosa (C.Presl) Reiche; Lobelia polyphylla f. bracteosa (C.Presl) E.Wimm.; Lobelia polyphylla var. coquimbana (Vatke) Reiche; Lobelia polyphylla f. hyssopifolia (C.Presl) E.Wimm.; Lobelia polyphylla var. latifolia (A.DC.) Heynh.; Lobelia polyphylla f. linearifolia (Phil.) E.Wimm.; Lobelia polyphylla f. subdentata (C.Presl) E.Wimm.; Lobelia purpurea Lindl.; Rapuntium besserianum C.Presl; Rapuntium bracteosum C.Presl; Rapuntium hyssopifolium C.Presl; Rapuntium poeppigianum C.Presl; Rapuntium polyphyllum (Hook. & Arn.) C.Presl; Rapuntium purpureum (G.Don) C.Presl; Rapuntium subdentatum C.Presl; Tupa atropurpurea Vis.; Tupa axilliflora Phil.; Tupa besseriana (C.Presl) A.DC.; Tupa bracteosa (C.Presl) A.DC.; Tupa gayana Phil.; Tupa hyssopifolia (C.Presl) A.DC.; Tupa linearifolia Phil.; Tupa poeppigiana Phil.; Tupa polyphylla (Hook. & Arn.) G.Don; Tupa polyphylla var. angustifolia Hook. & Arn. ex A.DC.; Tupa polyphylla var. besseriana (C.Presl) Vatke; Tupa polyphylla var. bracteosa (C.Presl) Vatke; Tupa polyphylla var. coquimbana Vatke; Tupa polyphylla var. latifolia A.DC.; Tupa purpurea G.Don; Tupa serrata Phil.; Tupa subdentata (C.Presl) A.DC.

= Lobelia polyphylla =

Species of flowering plant

Lobelia polyphylla, called the tabaco del Diablo (along with Lobelia tupa), is a species of flowering plant in the family Campanulaceae, native to northern and central Chile. When smoked, it has narcotic and hallucinogenic effects.
