= Lobelia subpubera =

Conservation status
- Endangered (IUCN 3.1)

Scientific classification
- Kingdom: Plantae
- Clade: Tracheophytes
- Clade: Angiosperms
- Clade: Eudicots
- Clade: Asterids
- Order: Asterales
- Family: Campanulaceae
- Genus: Lobelia
- Species: L. subpubera

Binomial name
- Lobelia subpubera Wedd.

Synonyms
- Dortmanna subpubera (Wedd.) Kuntze

Species of flowering plant

Lobelia subpubera is a species of plant in the family Campanulaceae. It is endemic to Ecuador. It is a perennial which grows in high-elevation subalpine grassland (páramo). It is known from two locations, Volcán Cotopaxi and around Laguna de Atillo in Sangay National Park.

It is threatened by habitat loss.
