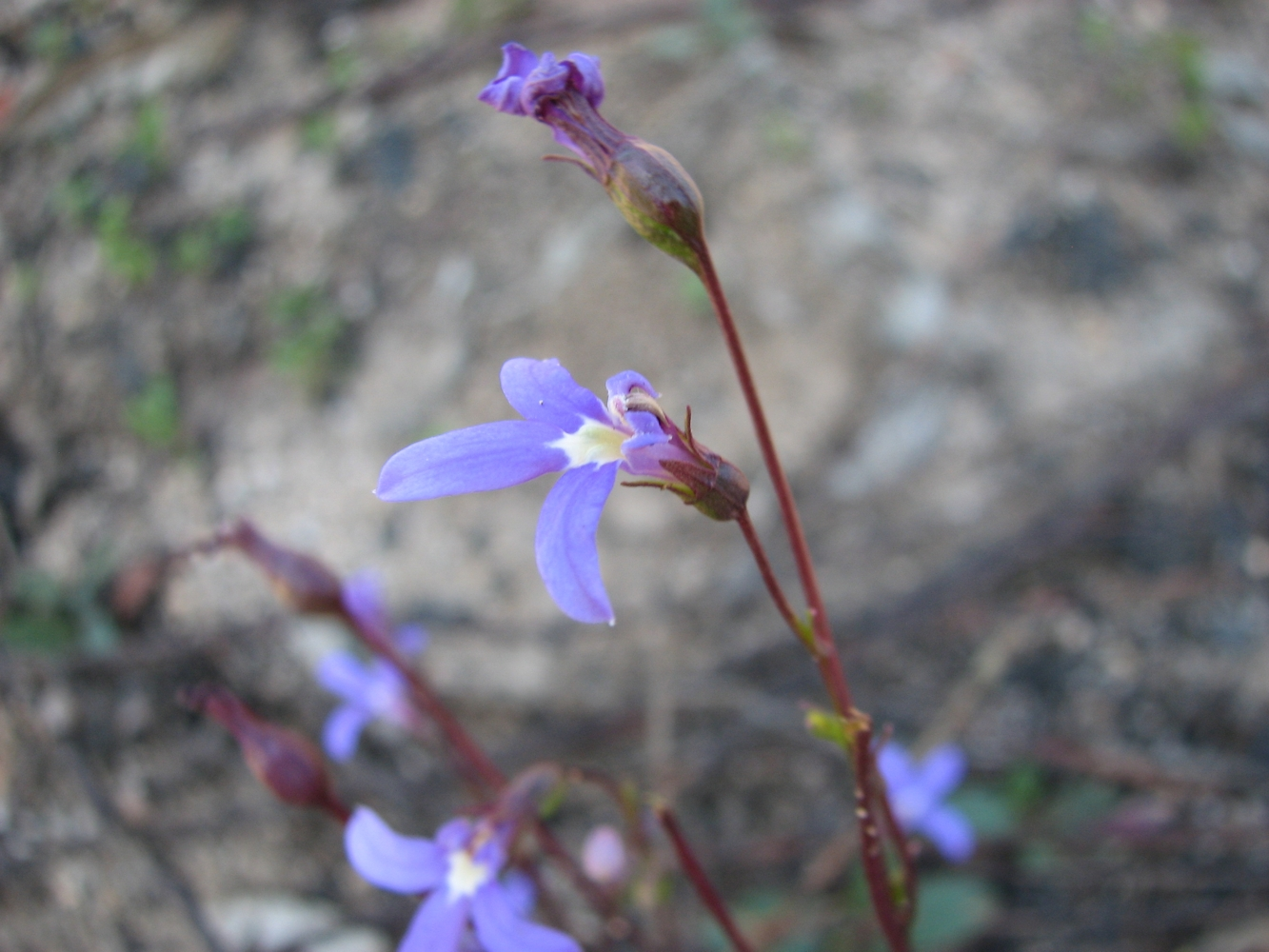
- Lobelia rhombifolia, Bunyip State Park, Victoria

Scientific classification
- Kingdom: Plantae
- Clade: Tracheophytes
- Clade: Angiosperms
- Clade: Eudicots
- Clade: Asterids
- Order: Asterales
- Family: Campanulaceae
- Genus: Lobelia
- Species: L. rhombifolia

Binomial name
- Lobelia rhombifolia de Vriese

= Lobelia rhombifolia =

Species of plant

Lobelia rhombifolia, commonly known as tufted lobelia, is an annual plant from southern Australia. They range from 5 to 30 cm in height and produce purple flowers, with a white throat and two recurved upper lobes. The flowers appear at different times across their native range:

- September to December in Western Australia
- October and November in South Australia
- November in Victoria
- October to February in Tasmania

The species was first formally described in 1845 by German botanist Johann Lehmann in Plantae Preissianae.

In Tasmania, the species is classified as "rare" under the Threatened Species Protection Act.
