= Lobelia simulans =

Scientific classification
- Kingdom: Plantae
- Clade: Tracheophytes
- Clade: Angiosperms
- Clade: Eudicots
- Clade: Asterids
- Order: Asterales
- Family: Campanulaceae
- Genus: Lobelia
- Species: L. simulans

Binomial name
- Lobelia simulans N.G.Walsh

Species of flowering plant

Lobelia simulans is a small herbaceous plant in the family Campanulaceae native to Western Australia, and was first described in 2010 by Neville Walsh, David Albrecht and Eric Knox.

The species is found scattered throughout the Mid West region of Western Australia.
