= Lobelia rarifolia =

Scientific classification
- Kingdom: Plantae
- Clade: Tracheophytes
- Clade: Angiosperms
- Clade: Eudicots
- Clade: Asterids
- Order: Asterales
- Family: Campanulaceae
- Genus: Lobelia
- Species: L. rarifolia

Binomial name
- Lobelia rarifolia E.Wimm.

Species of flowering plant

Lobelia rarifolia is a small herbaceous plant in the family Campanulaceae native to Western Australia.

The erect, slender and annual herb typically grows to a height of 0.07 to 0.25 metres (0.2 to 0.8 ft). It blooms between September and December producing blue flowers.

The species is found on plains, lateritic ridges and damp flats in the South West, Wheatbelt, Great Southern and Goldfields-Esperance regions of Western Australia where it grows in sandy-clay-loam soils.
