= Lobelia rhytidosperma =

Scientific classification
- Kingdom: Plantae
- Clade: Tracheophytes
- Clade: Angiosperms
- Clade: Eudicots
- Clade: Asterids
- Order: Asterales
- Family: Campanulaceae
- Genus: Lobelia
- Species: L. rhytidosperma

Binomial name
- Lobelia rhytidosperma Benth.

Species of flowering plant

Lobelia rhytidosperma, commonly known as wrinkled-seeded lobelia, is a small herbaceous plant in the family Campanulaceae native to Western Australia.

The erect and glabrous herb typically grows to a height of 0.1 to 0.3 metres (0.3 to 1.0 ft). It blooms between October and December producing blue flowers.

The species is found along the west coast in the South West, Wheatbelt and Mid West regions of Western Australia where it grows in lateritic soils.
