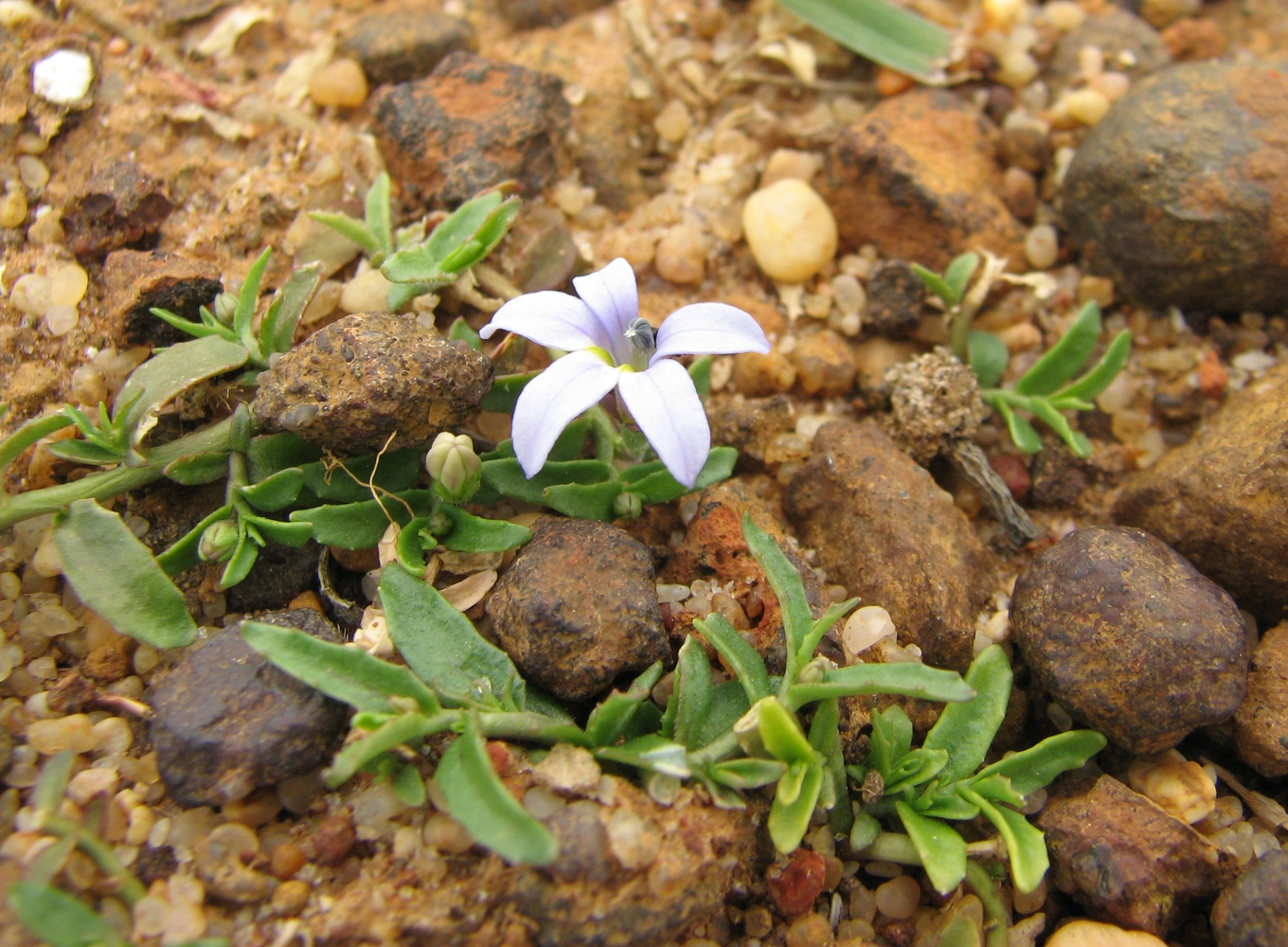
- Lobelia pratioides, Illfracombe, Victoria

Scientific classification
- Kingdom: Plantae
- Clade: Tracheophytes
- Clade: Angiosperms
- Clade: Eudicots
- Clade: Asterids
- Order: Asterales
- Family: Campanulaceae
- Genus: Lobelia
- Species: L. pratioides

Binomial name
- Lobelia pratioides Benth.

= Lobelia pratioides =

Species of plant

Lobelia pratioides, the poison lobelia, is a small prostrate flowering plant, native to Australia. The leaves are usually between 6 and 15 mm long. Pale blue or lilac flowers are produced from November to January in the species native range. The rounded fruits are around 5 mm long.

The species occurs in damp areas within grasslands and grassy woodland in South Australia, Tasmania and Victoria. In Tasmania the species is listed as "vulnerable" under the TSP Act and in South Australia it is listed as "rare".
