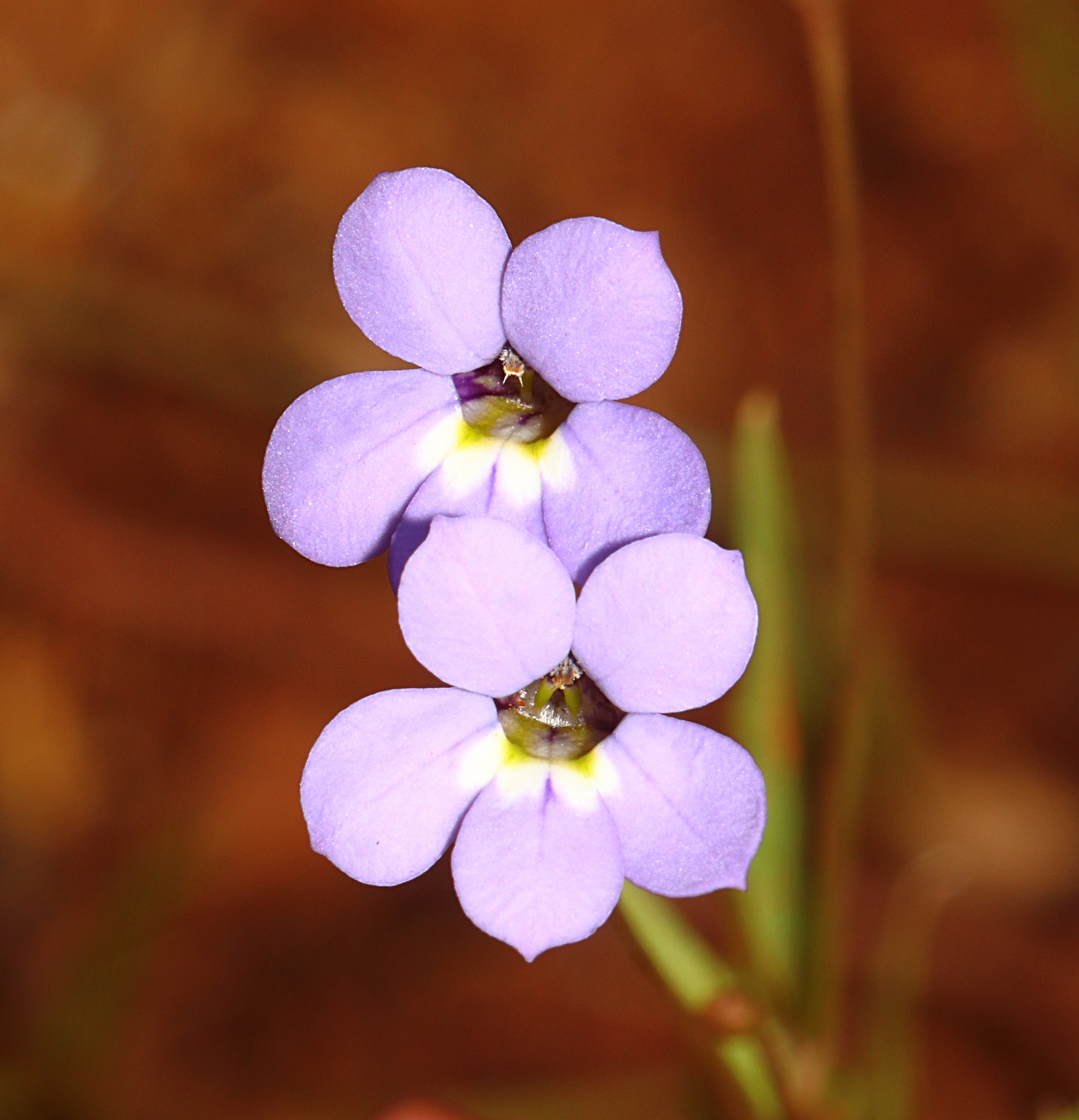

Scientific classification
- Kingdom: Plantae
- Clade: Tracheophytes
- Clade: Angiosperms
- Clade: Eudicots
- Clade: Asterids
- Order: Asterales
- Family: Campanulaceae
- Genus: Lobelia
- Species: L. douglasiana

Binomial name
- Lobelia douglasiana F.M.Bailey

= Lobelia douglasiana =

Species of flowering plant

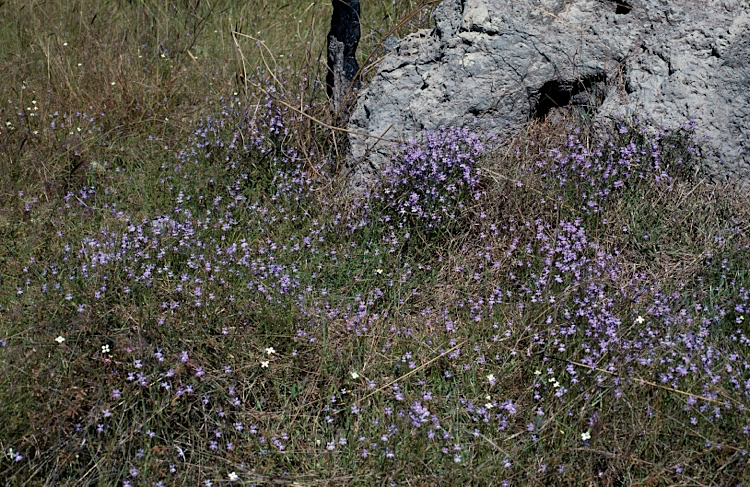
Habit

Lobelia douglasiana is a flowering plant in the family Campanulaceae and is endemic to northern Australia. It is a small, spreading herb with blue and white flowers.

== Description ==
Lobelia douglasiana is a twining, slender annual 0.07–0.15 m (2.8 in – 5.9 in) high with white or blue flowers. Flowering occurs from April to August.

== Taxonomy and naming ==
Lobelia douglasiana was first formally described in 1897 by Frederick Manson Bailey and the description was published in the Queensland Agricultural Journal. The specific epithet (douglasiana) may have been named after the politician John Douglas (1828–1904).

== Distribution and habitat ==
This lobelia grows in moist soils, laterite and clay near watercourses in Queensland, Western Australia and the Northern Territory.
