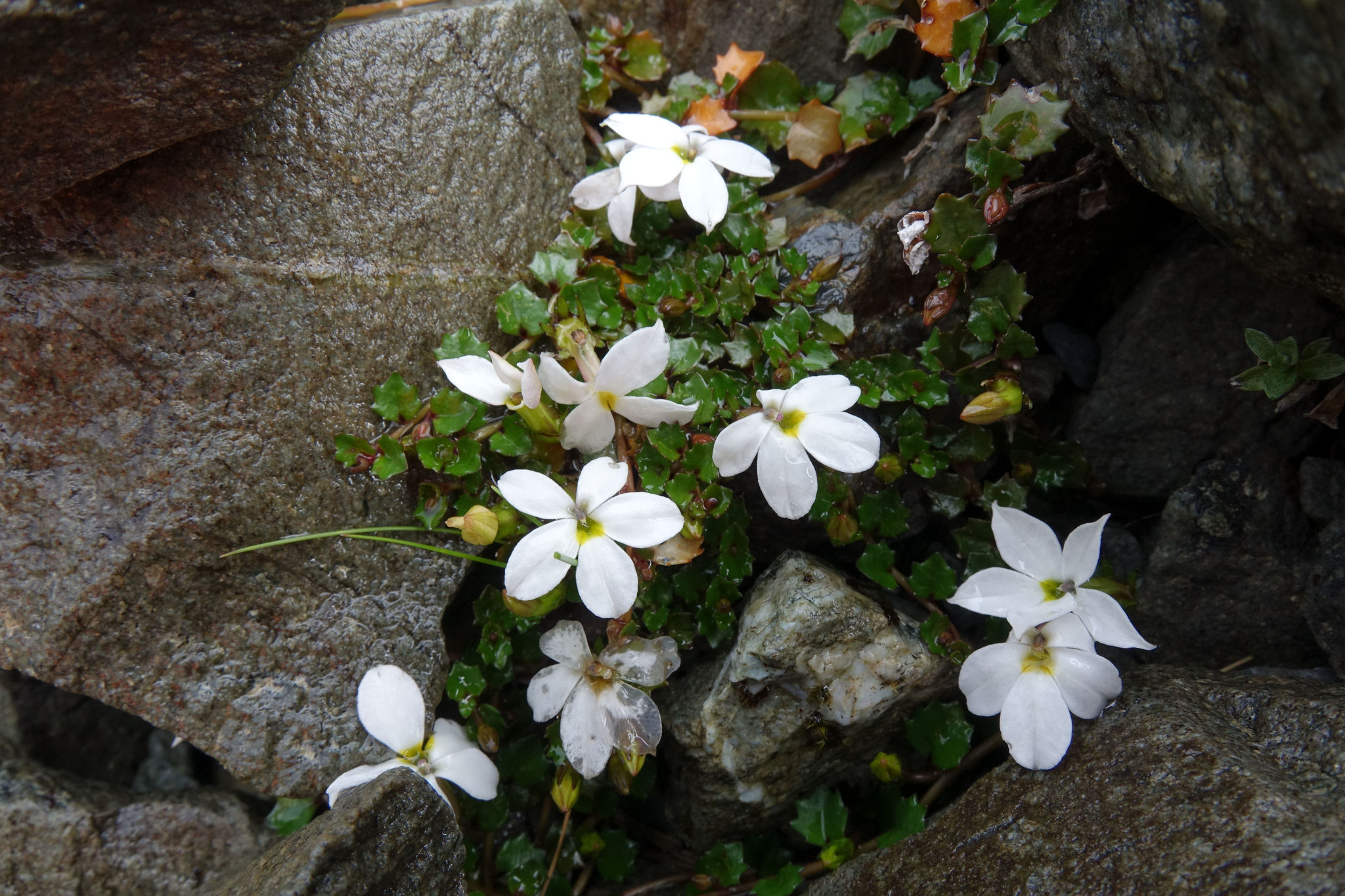
- Lobelia macrodon near Aoraki / Mount Cook

Conservation status
- Not Threatened (NZ TCS)

Scientific classification
- Kingdom: Plantae
- Clade: Tracheophytes
- Clade: Angiosperms
- Clade: Eudicots
- Clade: Asterids
- Order: Asterales
- Family: Campanulaceae
- Genus: Lobelia
- Species: L. macrodon

Binomial name
- Lobelia macrodon (Hook.f.) Lammers

= Lobelia macrodon =

Species of plant

Lobelia macrodon is a species of small flower from alpine habitats in New Zealand.

== Description ==
A small flower with grasping, mat-forming rooting structures. The Flower has white petals with five lobes and a large calyx.

== Range ==
Alpine habitats in New Zealand.
