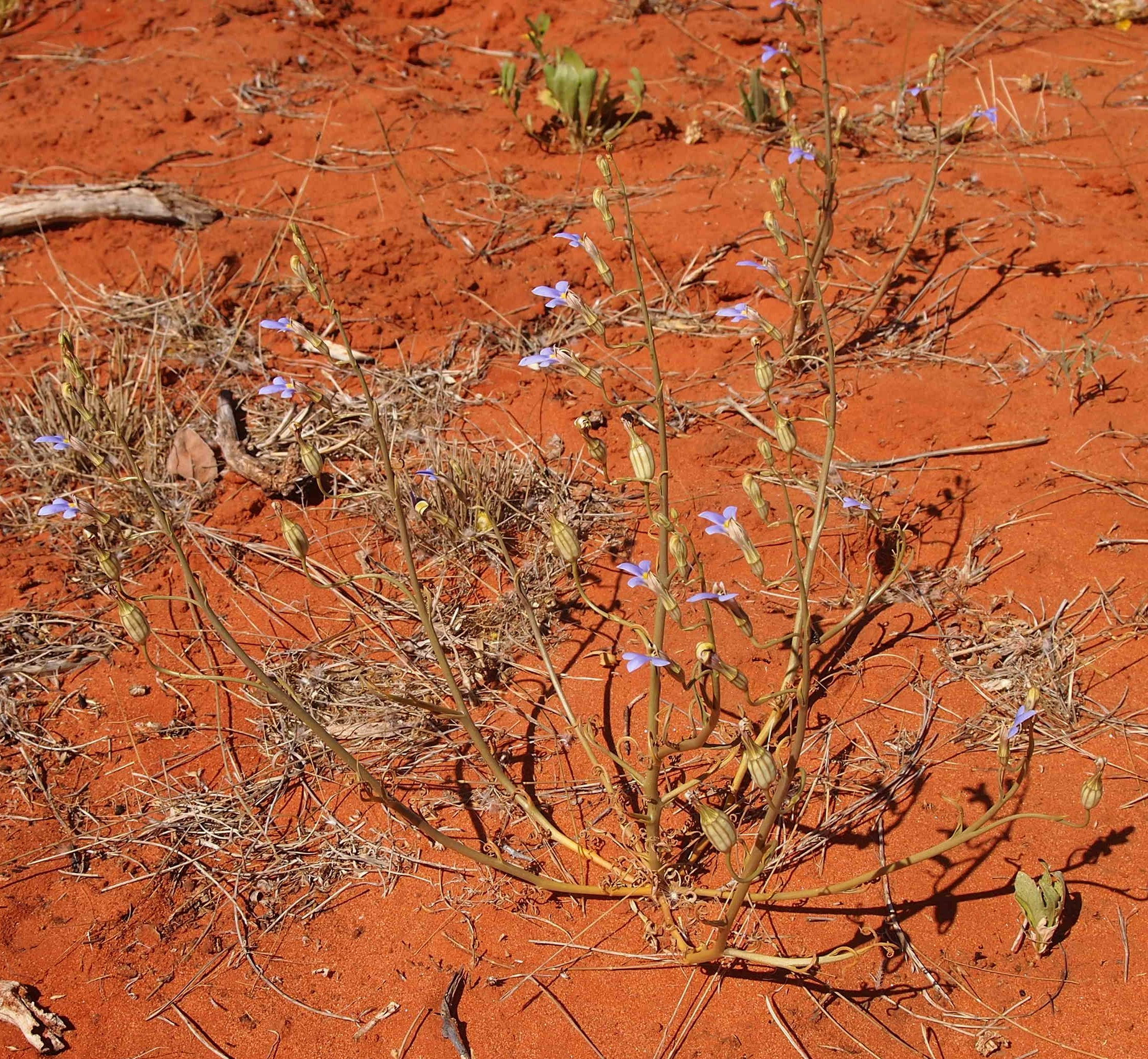

Scientific classification
- Kingdom: Plantae
- Clade: Tracheophytes
- Clade: Angiosperms
- Clade: Eudicots
- Clade: Asterids
- Order: Asterales
- Family: Campanulaceae
- Genus: Lobelia
- Species: L. heterophylla

Binomial name
- Lobelia heterophylla Labill.

= Lobelia heterophylla =

Species of plant

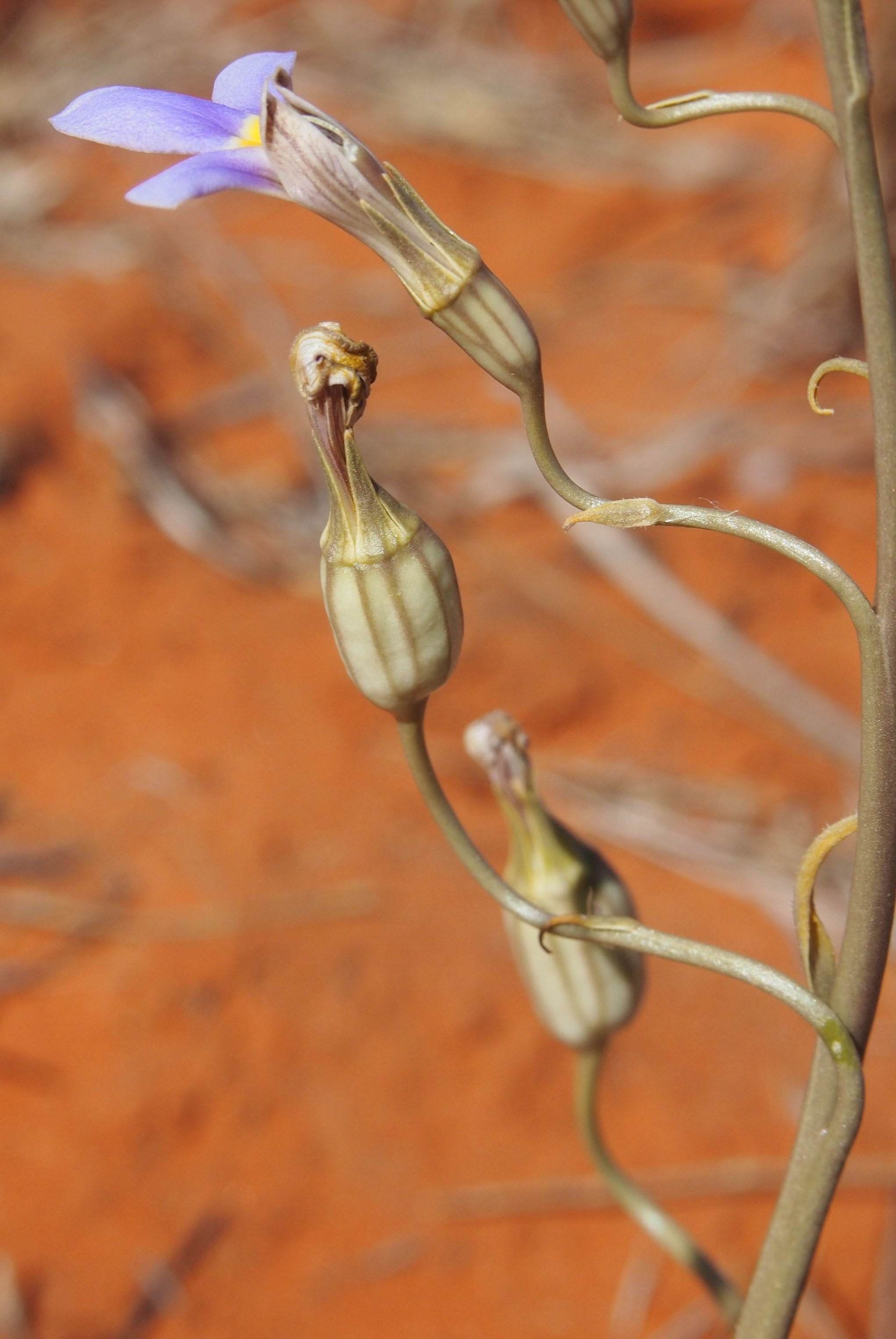
Flowers and fruit

Lobelia heterophylla is a blue to purple flowered herb found in Southern Australia. The specific epithet refers to the variety of leaf forms found on individual plants. The species was first described by Jacques Labillardière in his seminal work on Australian flora, Novae Hollandiae Plantarum Specimen. L. heterophylla has a wide distribution, due to its ability to inhabit a variety of soil types. The habit of the herbaceous plant is erect, up to 0.6 metres, with flowers appearing from August or October to December, or January to February. The flower whorl is deeply cleft, its colour range of blue, scarlet or purple is well known and it is considered to be a desirable specimen for use in gardens. The plant is commonly referred to as wing-seeded lobelia and Australian blue creeper (various-leaved lobelia). The species was featured and illustrated by Joseph Paxton in 1838.
