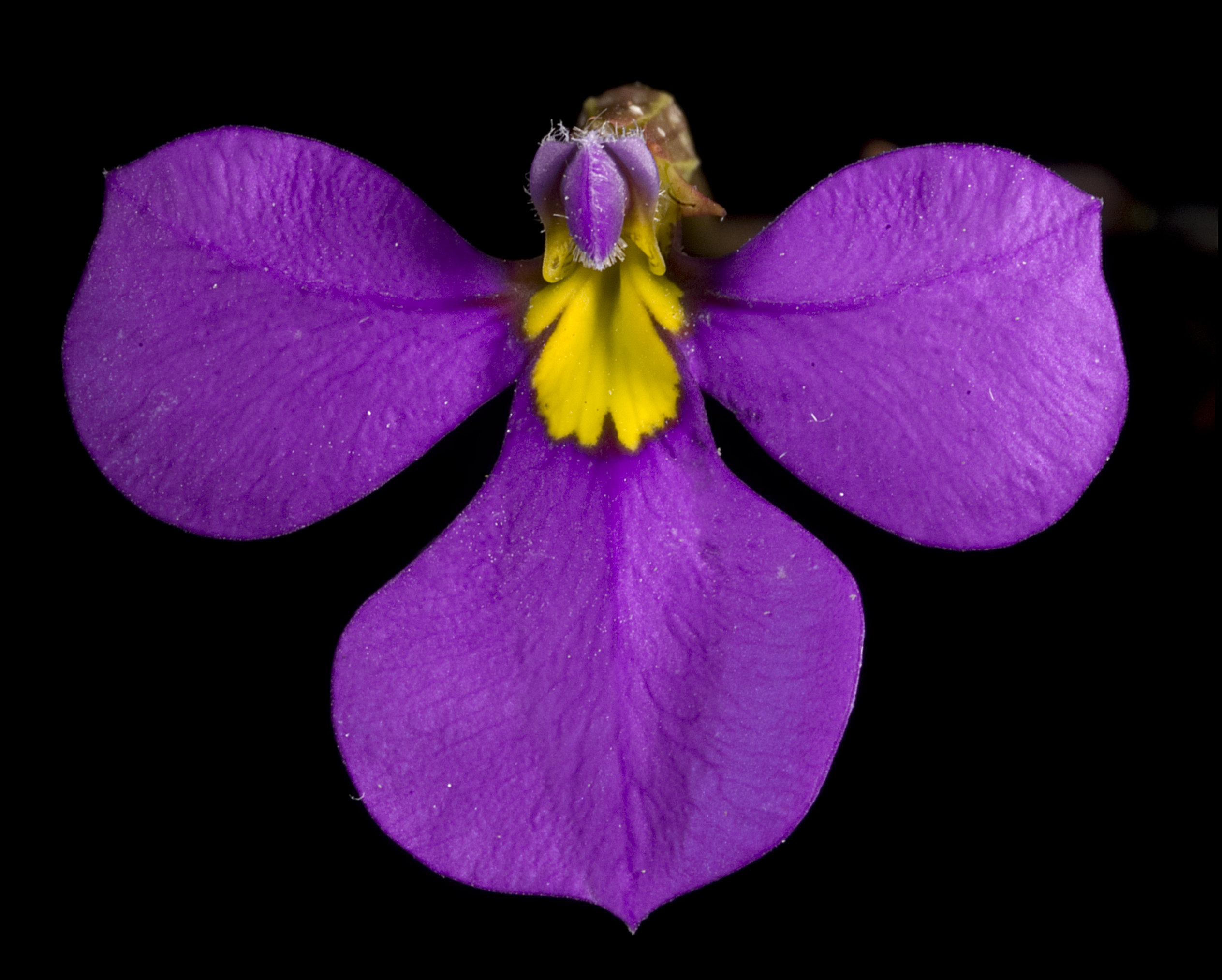

Scientific classification
- Kingdom: Plantae
- Clade: Tracheophytes
- Clade: Angiosperms
- Clade: Eudicots
- Clade: Asterids
- Order: Asterales
- Family: Campanulaceae
- Genus: Lobelia
- Species: L. winfridae

Binomial name
- Lobelia winfridae Diels

= Lobelia winfridae =

Species of flowering plant

Lobelia winfridae, commonly known as little lobelia, is a small herbaceous plant in the family Campanulaceae native to Western Australia.

The erect, annual herb typically grows to a height of 0.02 to 0.2 metres (0.1 to 0.7 ft). It blooms between August and November producing blue flowers.

The species is found on plains, lateritic screes, dunes and sandstone breakaways in the Mid West, Wheatbelt and Goldfields-Esperance regions of Western Australia where it grows in stony sandy-clay soils.
