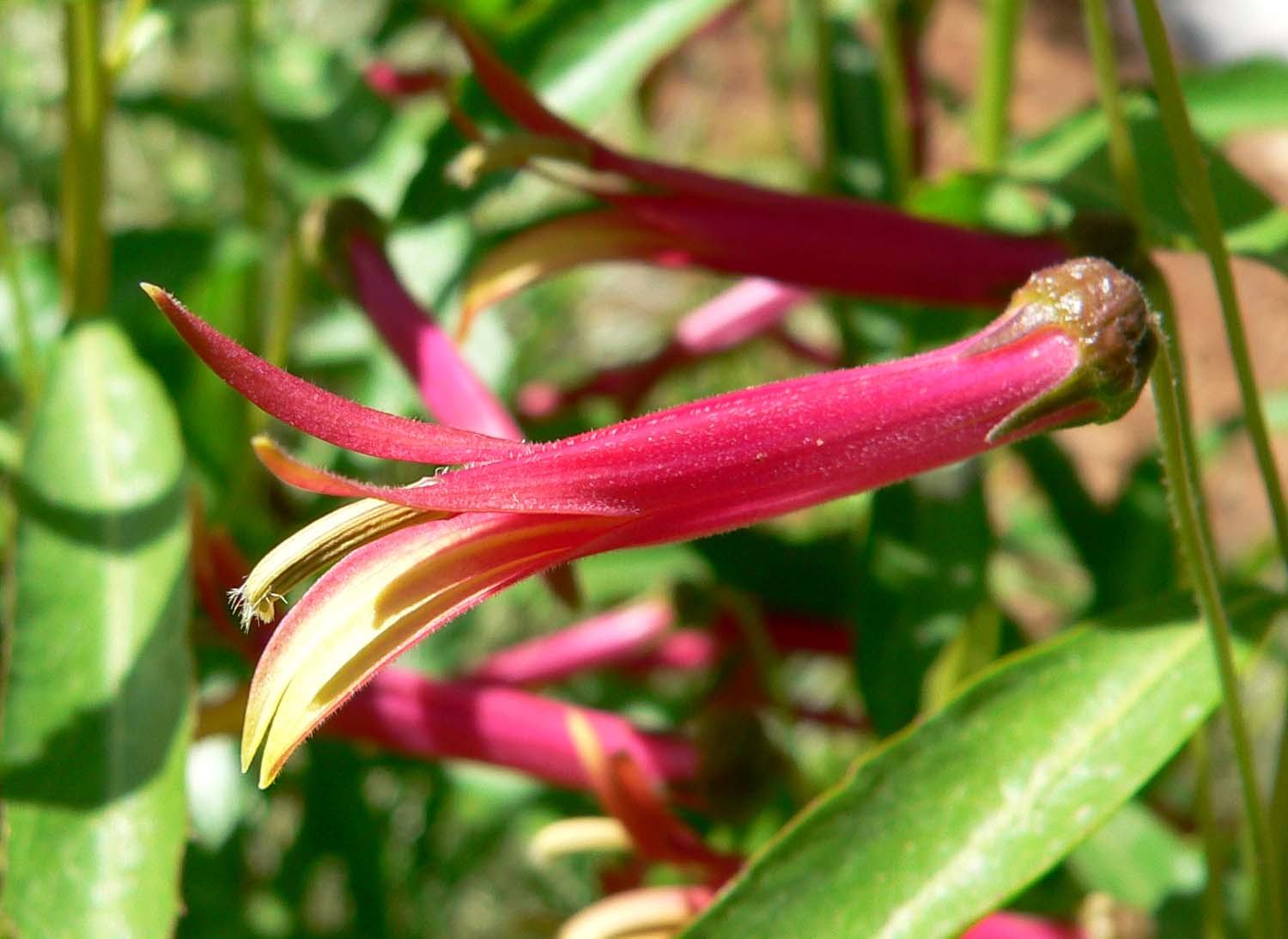

Conservation status
- Apparently Secure (NatureServe)

Scientific classification
- Kingdom: Plantae
- Clade: Tracheophytes
- Clade: Angiosperms
- Clade: Eudicots
- Clade: Asterids
- Order: Asterales
- Family: Campanulaceae
- Genus: Lobelia
- Species: L. laxiflora

Binomial name
- Lobelia laxiflora Kunth

Subspecies
- Lobelia laxiflora subsp. angustifolia (A.DC.) Eakes & Lammers; Lobelia laxiflora subsp. laxiflora

Synonyms
- Dortmanna laxiflora (Kunth) Kuntze; Rapuntium laxiflorum (Kunth) C.Presl; Tupa laxiflora (Kunth) Planch. & Oerst.

= Lobelia laxiflora =

Species of flowering plant

Lobelia laxiflora is a species of flowering plant in the family Campanulaceae. It is a subshrub or shrub native to the Americas, where it ranges from southern Arizona through Mexico and Central America to Colombia. It is known by several English-language common names, including Mexican lobelia, Sierra Madre lobelia, Mexican cardinalflower, looseflowers lobelia, and drooping lobelia. In Spanish and Nahuatl it is known as aretitos, acaxóchitl, and chilpanxóchitl. It has gained the Royal Horticultural Society's Award of Garden Merit as an ornamental.

In general, this is a perennial herb, subshrub, or shrub usually growing up to about 1.5 meters in maximum height, but known to reach 3 meters. The leaves vary in shape, size, and texture. The inflorescence is a raceme up to 40 centimeters long bearing leaflike bracts and several flowers. The flower may be over 6 centimeters long including its tubular base and corolla with narrow, spreading lobes. It is usually red, sometimes yellowish. The anthers protrude from the corolla. The plant produces seeds and also spreads via underground runners.

In Mexico this plant grows in pine-oak forest habitat. In Arizona it has been noted in riparian woodland.

The hummingbird flower mite (Tropicoseius chiriquensis) lives in the flowers of this plant, feeding on the nectar and pollen and laying eggs. Each flower blooms for about a week, enough time for the mite to complete its life cycle.

Like other lobelias, this species contains medicinally useful alkaloids. Several new compounds have been discovered during chemical analyses of this plant.

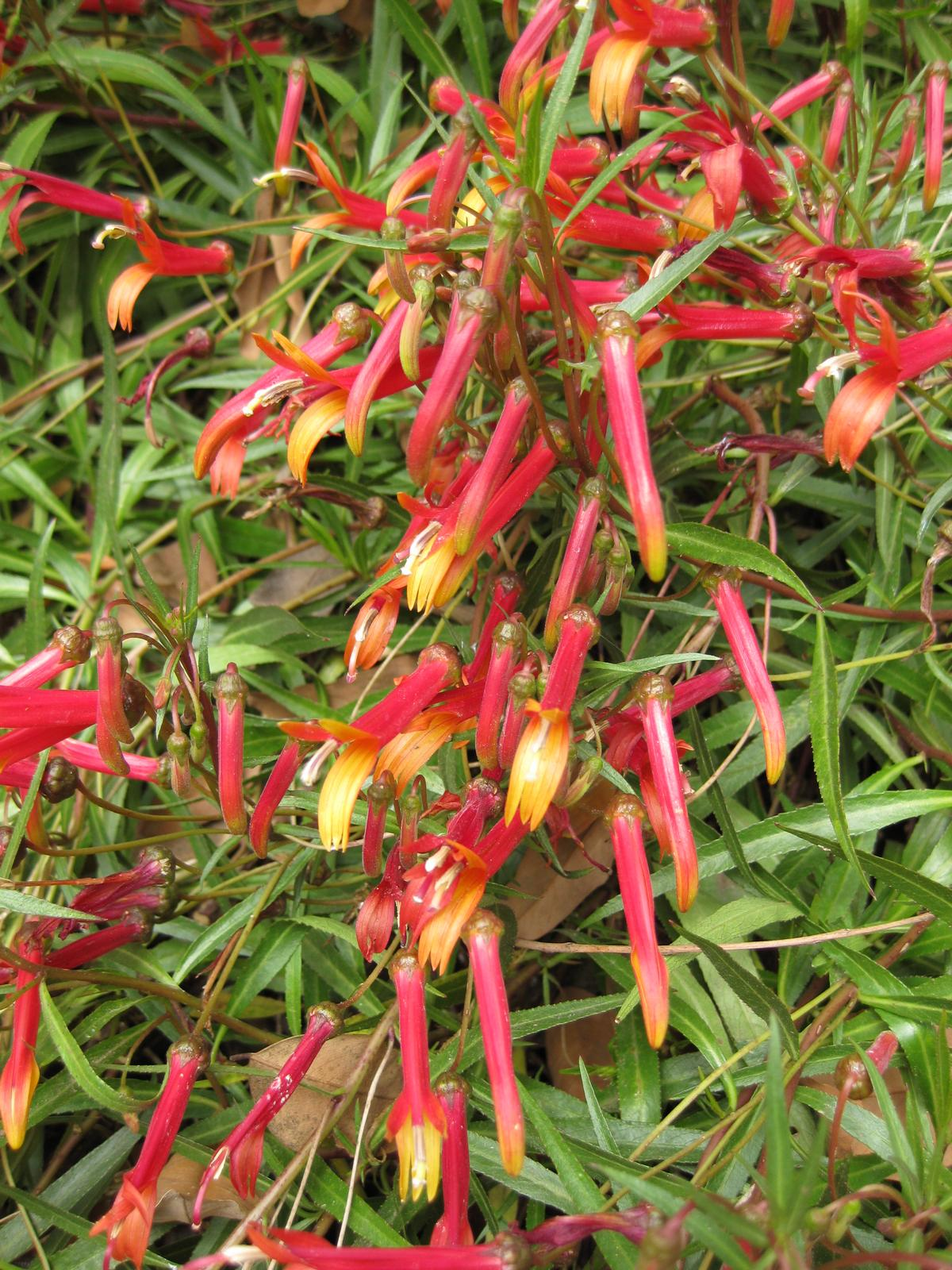
Lobelia laxiflora, Huntington Gardens
