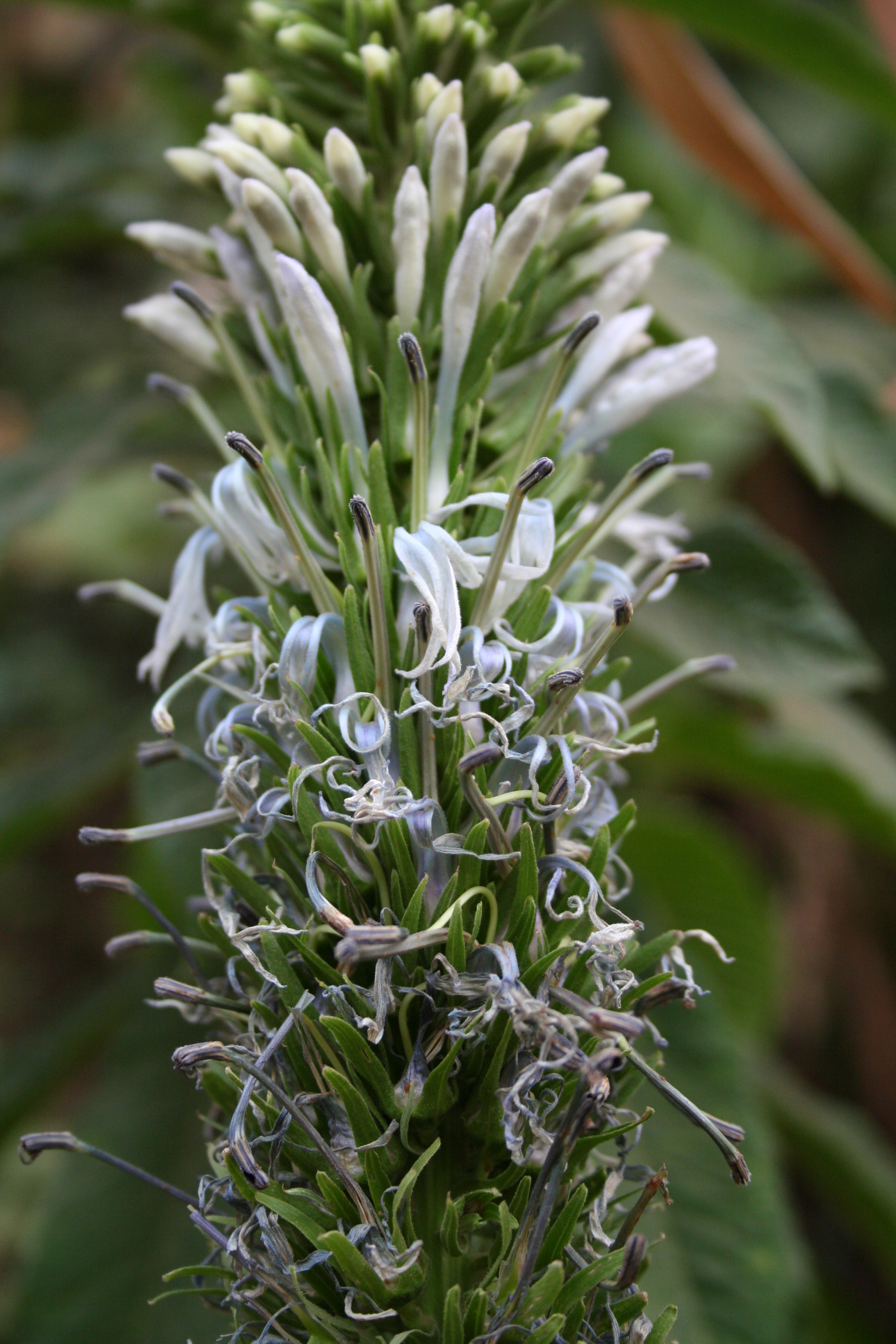
- Inflorescence of Lobelia columnaris, Laikom (Cameroon)

Conservation status
- Vulnerable (IUCN 3.1)

Scientific classification
- Kingdom: Plantae
- Clade: Tracheophytes
- Clade: Angiosperms
- Clade: Eudicots
- Clade: Asterids
- Order: Asterales
- Family: Campanulaceae
- Genus: Lobelia
- Species: L. columnaris

Binomial name
- Lobelia columnaris Hook.f.

= Lobelia columnaris =

Species of flowering plant

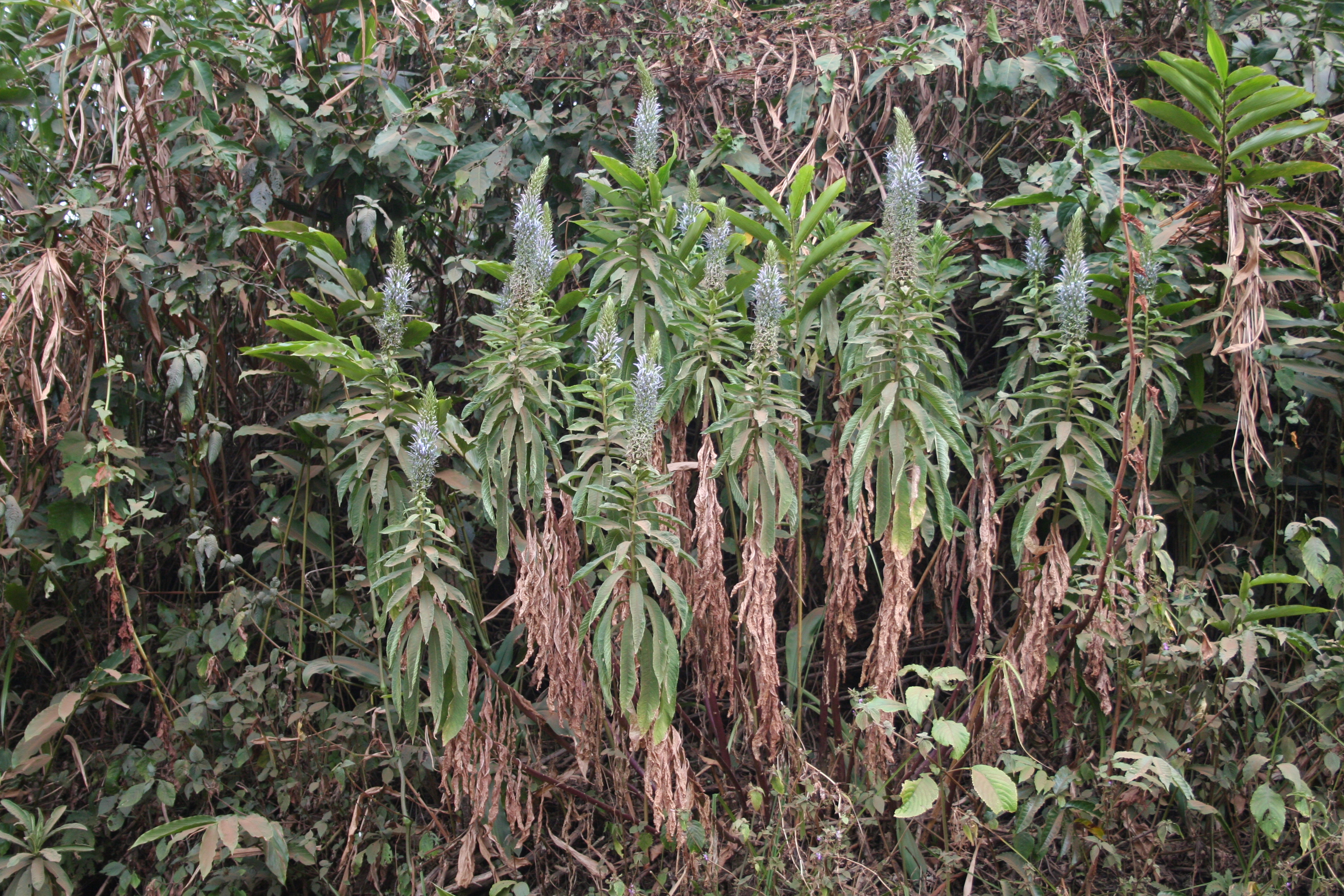

Lobelia columnaris is a species of plant in the family Campanulaceae. It is the only giant Lobelia occurring in West Africa and is found in Cameroon and Equatorial Guinea. Its natural habitat is subtropical or tropical dry forests.
