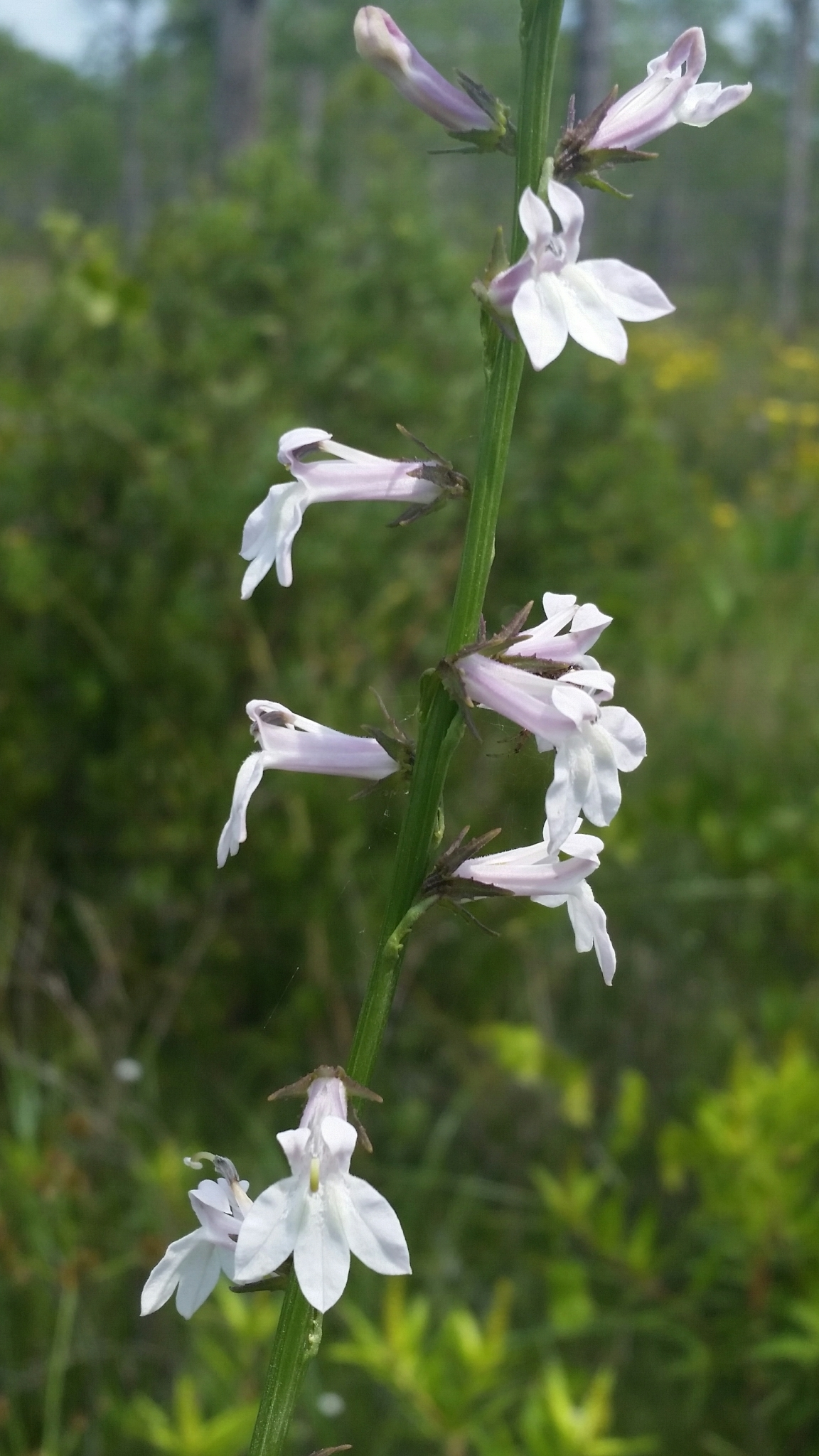
- In Franklin County, Florida

Scientific classification
- Kingdom: Plantae
- Clade: Tracheophytes
- Clade: Angiosperms
- Clade: Eudicots
- Clade: Asterids
- Order: Asterales
- Family: Campanulaceae
- Genus: Lobelia
- Species: L. floridana

Binomial name
- Lobelia floridana Chapm.

Synonyms
- Lobelia paludosa var. floridana (Chapm.) A.Gray

= Lobelia floridana =

Species of flowering plant

Lobelia floridana, commonly known as Florida lobelia, is a species of flowering plant in the bellflower family (Campanulaceae) native the southeastern United States. It was first formally named in 1878 by Alvan Wentworth Chapman.
