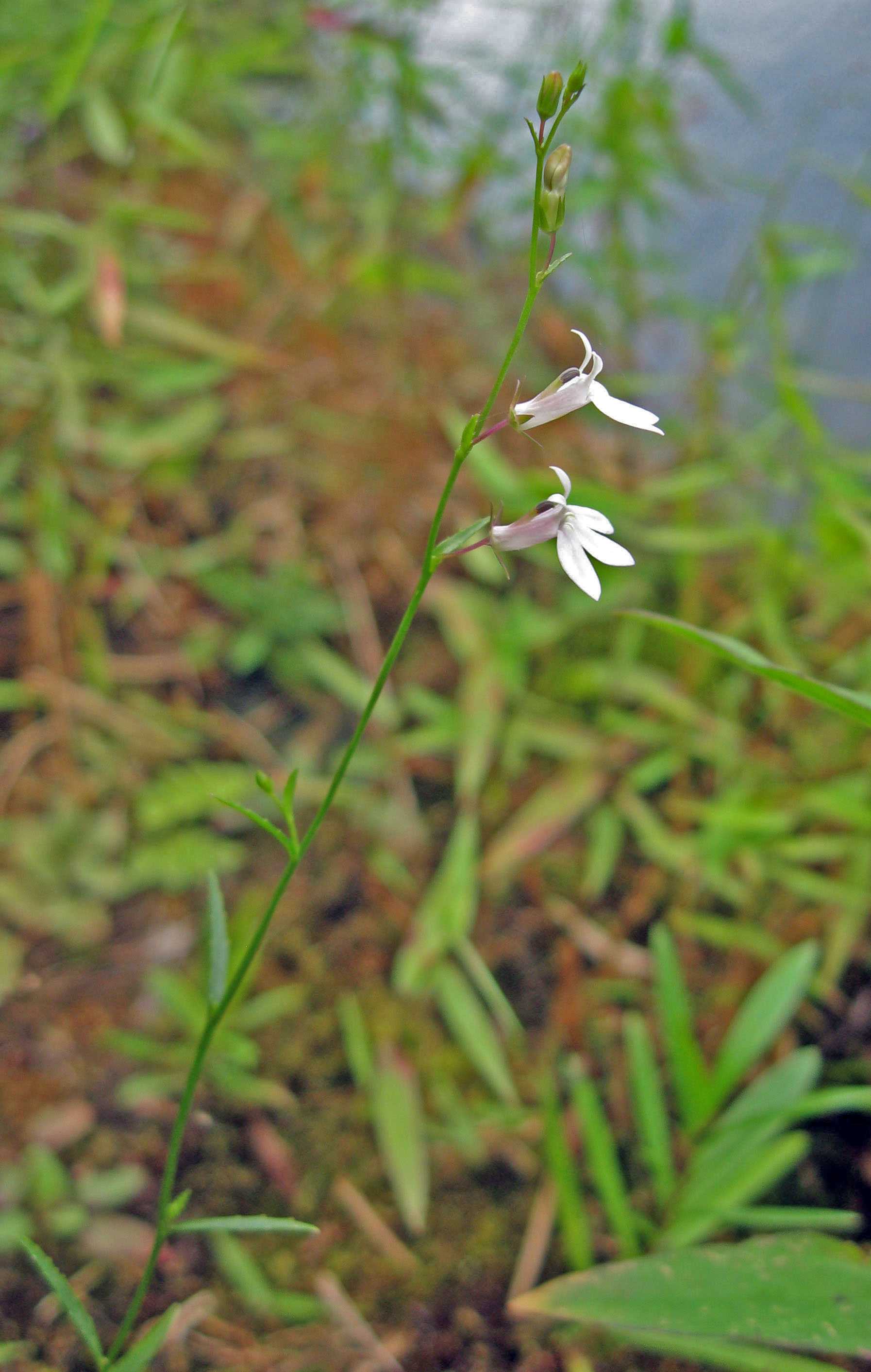

Scientific classification
- Kingdom: Plantae
- Clade: Tracheophytes
- Clade: Angiosperms
- Clade: Eudicots
- Clade: Asterids
- Order: Asterales
- Family: Campanulaceae
- Genus: Lobelia
- Species: L. nuttallii

Binomial name
- Lobelia nuttallii J.A.Schultes

= Lobelia nuttallii =

Species of flowering plant

Lobelia nuttallii is a species of flowering plant in the bellflower family commonly called Nuttall's lobelia. It is native to the Eastern United States where it is found in coastal areas, with disjunct populations in the Southern Blue Ridge Mountains and the Cumberland Plateau. It is mostly found in habitats with wet, sandy, acidic soils such as flatwoods and southern bogs.

It is a small, delicate perennial that produces pale blue flowers in the late summer.
