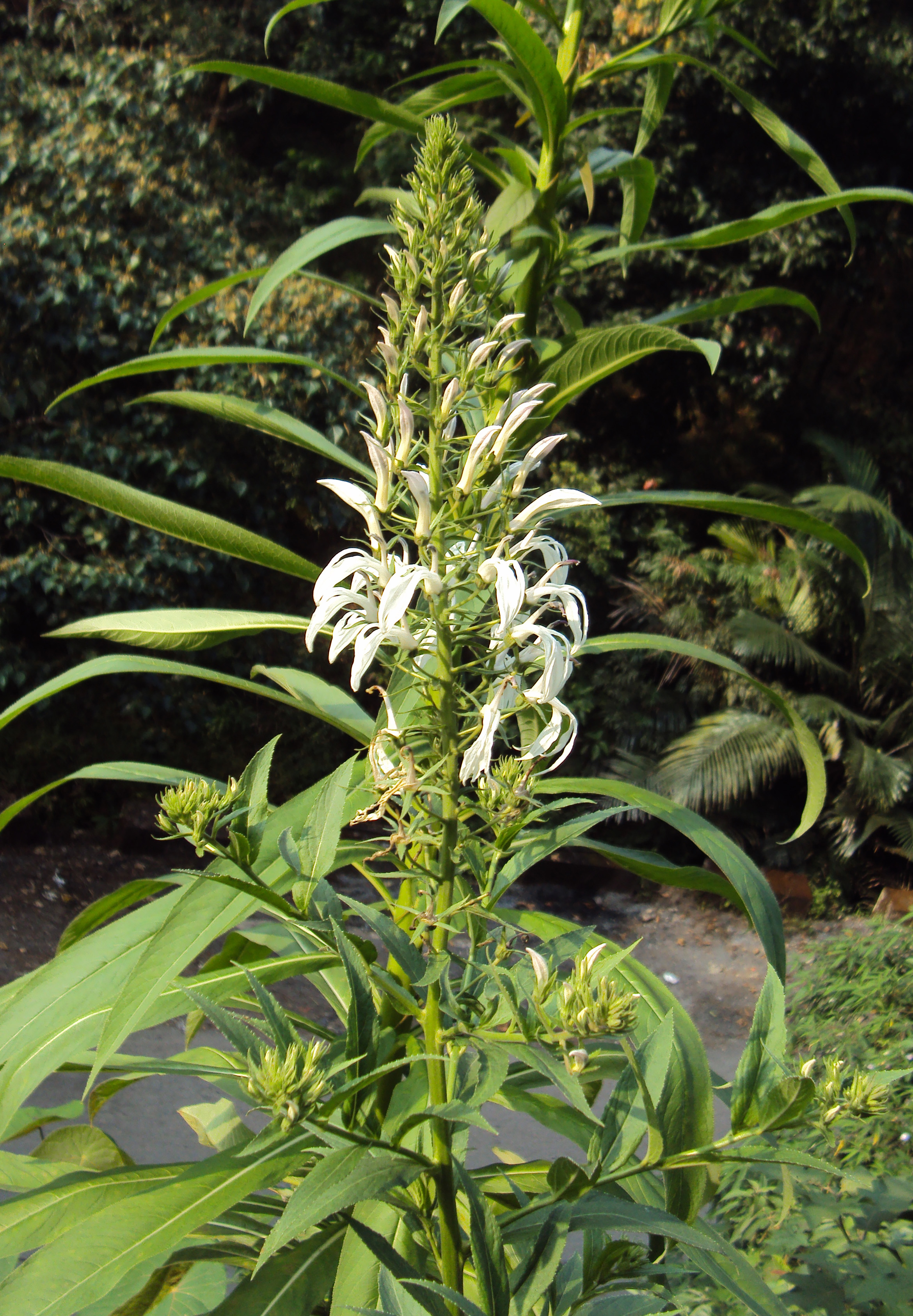

Scientific classification
- Kingdom: Plantae
- Clade: Tracheophytes
- Clade: Angiosperms
- Clade: Eudicots
- Clade: Asterids
- Order: Asterales
- Family: Campanulaceae
- Genus: Lobelia
- Species: L. nicotianifolia

Binomial name
- Lobelia nicotianifolia L.

Synonyms
- Lobelia nicotianaefolia; Dortmannia nicotianifolia (Roth ex Schult.) Kuntze; Lobelia camptodon E.Wimm.; Lobelia courtallensis K.K.N.Nair; Lobelia nicotianifolia var. bibarbata E.Wimm.; Lobelia nicotianifolia var. brevipedicellata E.Wimm.; Lobelia nicotianifolia var. macrostemon Skottsb.; Lobelia nicotianifolia var. trichandra (Wight) C.B.Clarke; Lobelia trichandra Wight; Rapuntium nicotianifolium (Roth ex Schult.) C.Presl

= Lobelia nicotianifolia =

Species of flowering plant

Lobelia nicotianifolia is a species of flowering plant with a distribution primarily across India and Sri Lanka. It is commonly called wild tobacco, because the leaves resemble tobacco leaves. It is a poisonous plant.

== Flowering ==
December.

== Medicinal uses ==
Lobelia nicotianifolia is used in India to treat bronchitis, asthma, and insect and scorpion bites and to induce nausea and vomiting.

== Common names ==
- English: Wild tobacco
- Hindi: धवल Dhawal, नरसल Narasala
- Marathi: Dhawal, रान तंबाखू Ran tambakhu
- Tamil: Upperichedi, காட்டுப்புகையிலை Kattu-p-pukaiyilai
- Malayalam: Kattupokala, കാട് പുകയില Kaat Pukayila
- Telugu: అడవి పొగాకు Adavipogaku
- Kannada: ಕಾಡು ಹೊಗೆಸೊಪ್ಪು Kadahogesoppu, ಕಾಡು ತಮ್ಬಾಕು Kaadu Tambaaku
- Bengali: Badanala
- Gujarati: નળી Nali
- Sinhala: Wal dunkola
- Konkani: बकनल Baknal
- Sanskrit: म्रित्युपुष्प Mrityupushpa, म्रदुछड़ Mriduchhada, महानाला Mahanala, सुराद्रुम Suradruma
- Bengali: নাল Nala, বাদানাল Badanala
- Mizo: Berawchal
