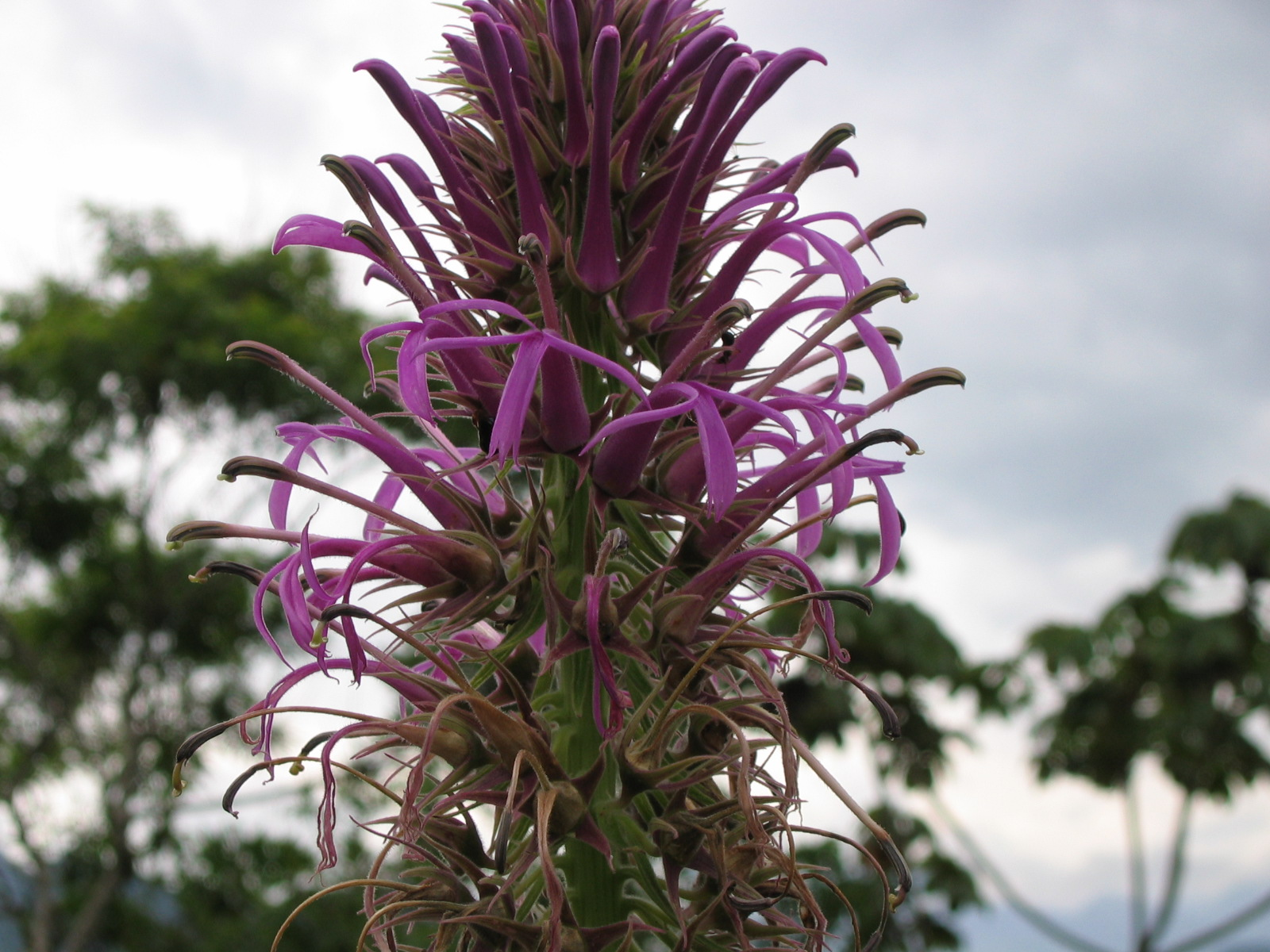

Scientific classification
- Kingdom: Plantae
- Clade: Tracheophytes
- Clade: Angiosperms
- Clade: Eudicots
- Clade: Asterids
- Order: Asterales
- Family: Campanulaceae
- Genus: Lobelia
- Species: L. thapsoidea

Binomial name
- Lobelia thapsoidea Schott

= Lobelia thapsoidea =

Species of flowering plant

Lobelia thapsoidea is a tall herb that grows in elevated areas of Southeastern Brazil. As all other species in the subfamily Lobelioideae, it is poisonous and should be handled carefully.
