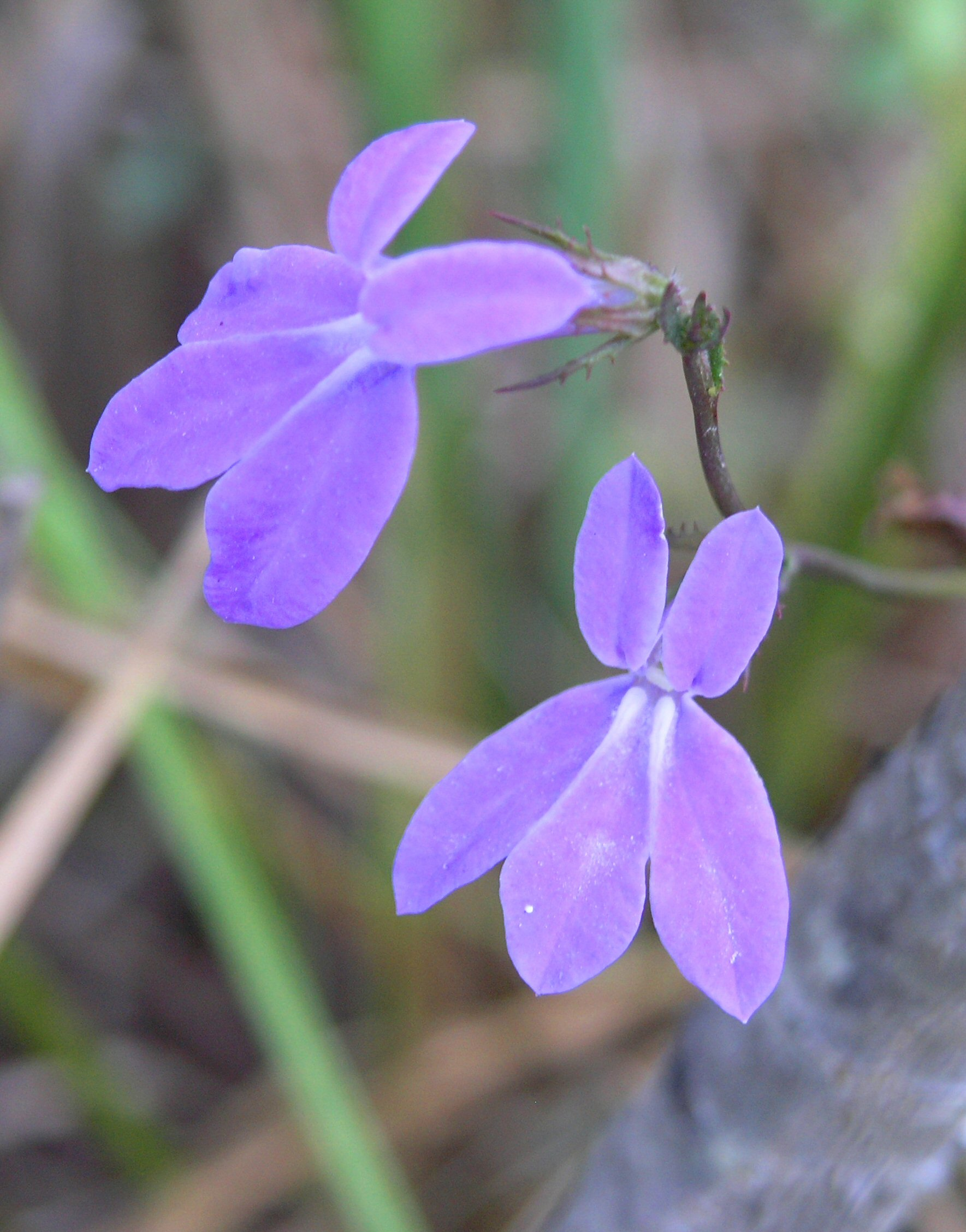

Scientific classification
- Kingdom: Plantae
- Clade: Tracheophytes
- Clade: Angiosperms
- Clade: Eudicots
- Clade: Asterids
- Order: Asterales
- Family: Campanulaceae
- Genus: Lobelia
- Species: L. glandulosa

Binomial name
- Lobelia glandulosa Walter

= Lobelia glandulosa =

Flowering plant

Lobelia glandulosa, known as the glade lobelia, is a perennial flowering plant. It is in the bellflower family Campanulaceae. Its range encompasses North Carolina to southern Florida, and extends westward to southern Alabama. It is slender-stemmed with linear to narrow lance-shaped leaves.
