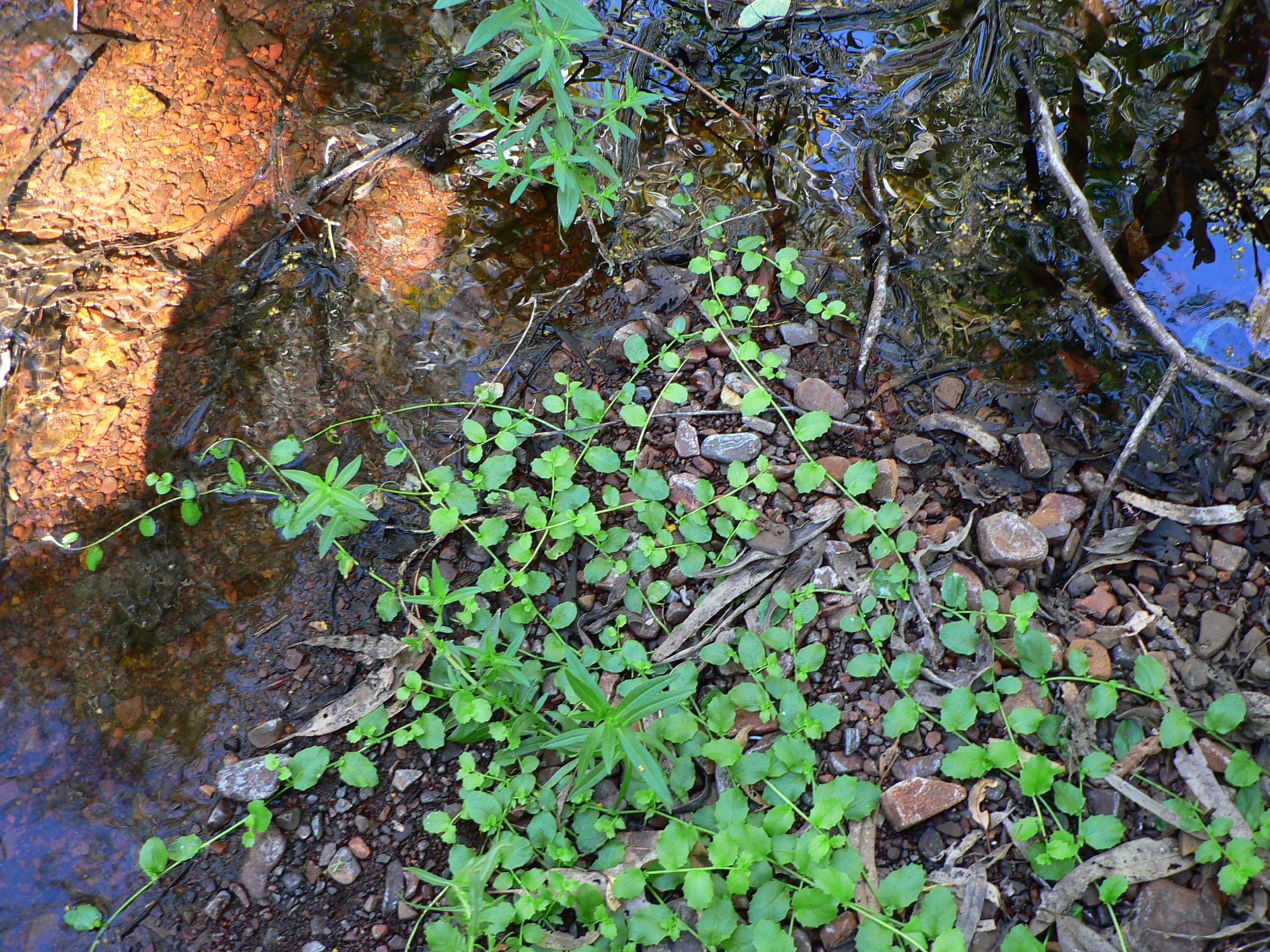

Scientific classification
- Kingdom: Plantae
- Clade: Tracheophytes
- Clade: Angiosperms
- Clade: Eudicots
- Clade: Asterids
- Order: Asterales
- Family: Campanulaceae
- Genus: Lobelia
- Species: L. arnhemiaca

Binomial name
- Lobelia arnhemiaca E.Wimm.

= Lobelia arnhemiaca =

Species of flowering plant

Lobelia arnhemiaca is a herb found in Western Australia, Northern Territory and Queensland.
