= Lobelia hereroensis =

Conservation status
- Vulnerable (IUCN 3.1)

Scientific classification
- Kingdom: Plantae
- Clade: Tracheophytes
- Clade: Angiosperms
- Clade: Eudicots
- Clade: Asterids
- Order: Asterales
- Family: Campanulaceae
- Genus: Lobelia
- Species: L. hereroensis

Binomial name
- Lobelia hereroensis Schinz

Species of flowering plant

Lobelia hereroensis is a species of plant in the family Campanulaceae. It is endemic to Namibia. It is threatened by habitat loss.
