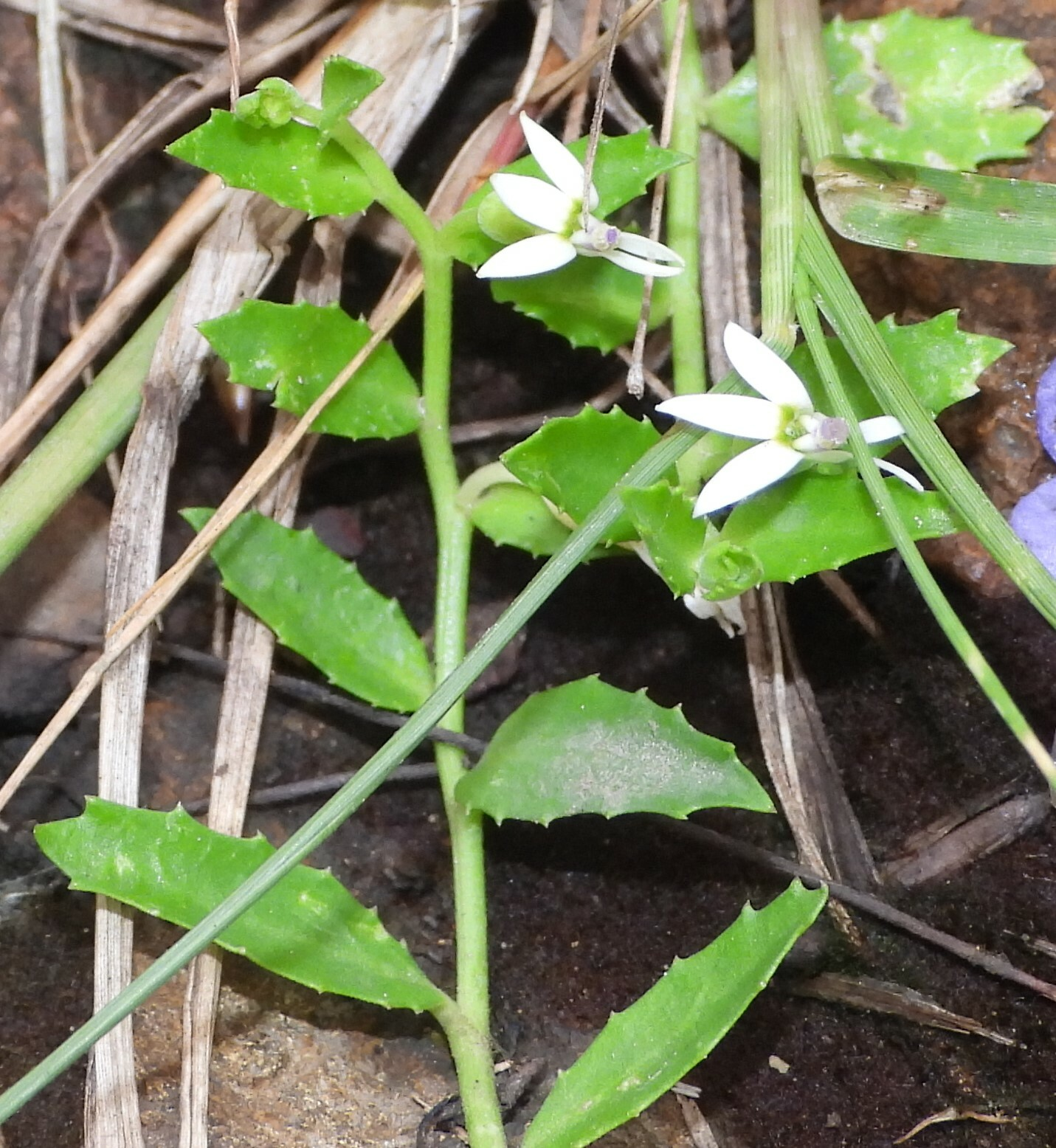

Conservation status
- Priority One — Poorly Known Taxa (DEC)

Scientific classification
- Kingdom: Plantae
- Clade: Tracheophytes
- Clade: Angiosperms
- Clade: Eudicots
- Clade: Asterids
- Order: Asterales
- Family: Campanulaceae
- Genus: Lobelia
- Species: L. leucotos

Binomial name
- Lobelia leucotos Albr.

= Lobelia leucotos =

Species of flowering plant

Lobelia leucotos is a species of herbaceous plant in the family Campanulaceae native to Australia.

The small perennial herb blooms between January and June producing white flowers.

The species is found in Queensland and Western Australia where it grows in skeletal sandy soils.
