= Lobelia feayana =

Scientific classification
- Kingdom: Plantae
- Clade: Tracheophytes
- Clade: Angiosperms
- Clade: Eudicots
- Clade: Asterids
- Order: Asterales
- Family: Campanulaceae
- Genus: Lobelia
- Species: L. feayana

Binomial name
- Lobelia feayana A.Gray

Synonyms
- Dortmanna feayana (A.Gray) Kuntz

Species of flowering plant

Lobelia feayana, also known as the bay lobelia or Feay's lobelia, is a species of bellflower endemic to Florida. A perennial dicot in the Campanulaceae family, it grows in moist areas such as ditches and is often spotted along roadsides. When clustered, the flowers have been described as appearing as a purple haze. It is pollinated by bees and the colors of the five petaled flowers vary from "bluish to lavender to purplish-pink". It is sometimes mistaken for blue toadflax (Linaria canadensis) which can also grow in groupings.
