= Lobelia amoena =

Scientific classification
- Kingdom: Plantae
- Clade: Embryophytes
- Clade: Tracheophytes
- Clade: Spermatophytes
- Clade: Angiosperms
- Clade: Eudicots
- Clade: Asterids
- Order: Asterales
- Family: Campanulaceae
- Genus: Lobelia
- Species: L. amoena

Binomial name
- Lobelia amoena Michx.

Species of plant

Lobelia amoena, commonly known as southern lobelia, is a species of flowering plant in the family Campanulaceae native to the southeastern United States.

== Description ==
Southern lobelia may be annual or perennial, and typically grows erectly with strict or freely branched stems. The leaves are elliptic to lanceolate in shape, measuring 4–15 cm in length and 2–4 cm in width. Leaf margins may be entire, crenate, or serrate. Inflorescences are terminal racemes that are often leafy and bracteate, giving the flowers an axillary appearance. The flowers are zygomorphic and bilabiate, with a 5-lobed calyx that is more or less actinomorphic. The corolla is 2-lipped and fenestrate, with the upper lip divided into two lobes and the lower into three. Sepals are entire or remotely glandular-serrate. The corolla tube is 7–9 mm long, and the filament tube measures 5–7 mm. There are five stamens, which are completely united. The fruit is a capsule, 6–8 mm wide, and dehisces apically through pores. Seeds are yellowish-brown, oblong, tuberculate, and range from 0.6 to 1 mm in length.

== Distribution and habitat ==
Southern lobelia is found from western North Carolina and eastern Tennessee south through western South Carolina to central Georgia and eastern/central Alabama. There is also a disjunct population in the Florida Panhandle and along the coastal plain of Georgia and South Carolina. It grows in floodplain forests, seeps, marshes, and along streambanks
