= Lobelia brevifolia =

Scientific classification
- Kingdom: Plantae
- Clade: Tracheophytes
- Clade: Angiosperms
- Clade: Eudicots
- Clade: Asterids
- Order: Asterales
- Family: Campanulaceae
- Genus: Lobelia
- Species: L. brevifolia

Binomial name
- Lobelia brevifolia Nutt. ex A. DC.

Species of plant

Lobelia brevifolia, the shortleaf lobelia, is a flowering plant species in the genus Lobelia. It is a perennial dicot in the Campanulaceae (bellflower) family. It grows in the Southeastern United States, in parts of Florida, Alabama, Mississippi, and Louisiana.

In Florida it grows in the Florida panhandle.
