= Lobelia fissiflora =

Scientific classification
- Kingdom: Plantae
- Clade: Tracheophytes
- Clade: Angiosperms
- Clade: Eudicots
- Clade: Asterids
- Order: Asterales
- Family: Campanulaceae
- Genus: Lobelia
- Species: L. fissiflora

Binomial name
- Lobelia fissiflora N.G.Walsh

Species of flowering plant

Lobelia fissiflora is a small herbaceous plant in the family Campanulaceae native to Western Australia, and first described in 2010 by Neville Walsh, David Albrecht and Eric Knox.

The herb is found scattered through the eastern Wheatbelt, southern parts of the MidWest and Goldfields-Esperance regions of Western Australia.
