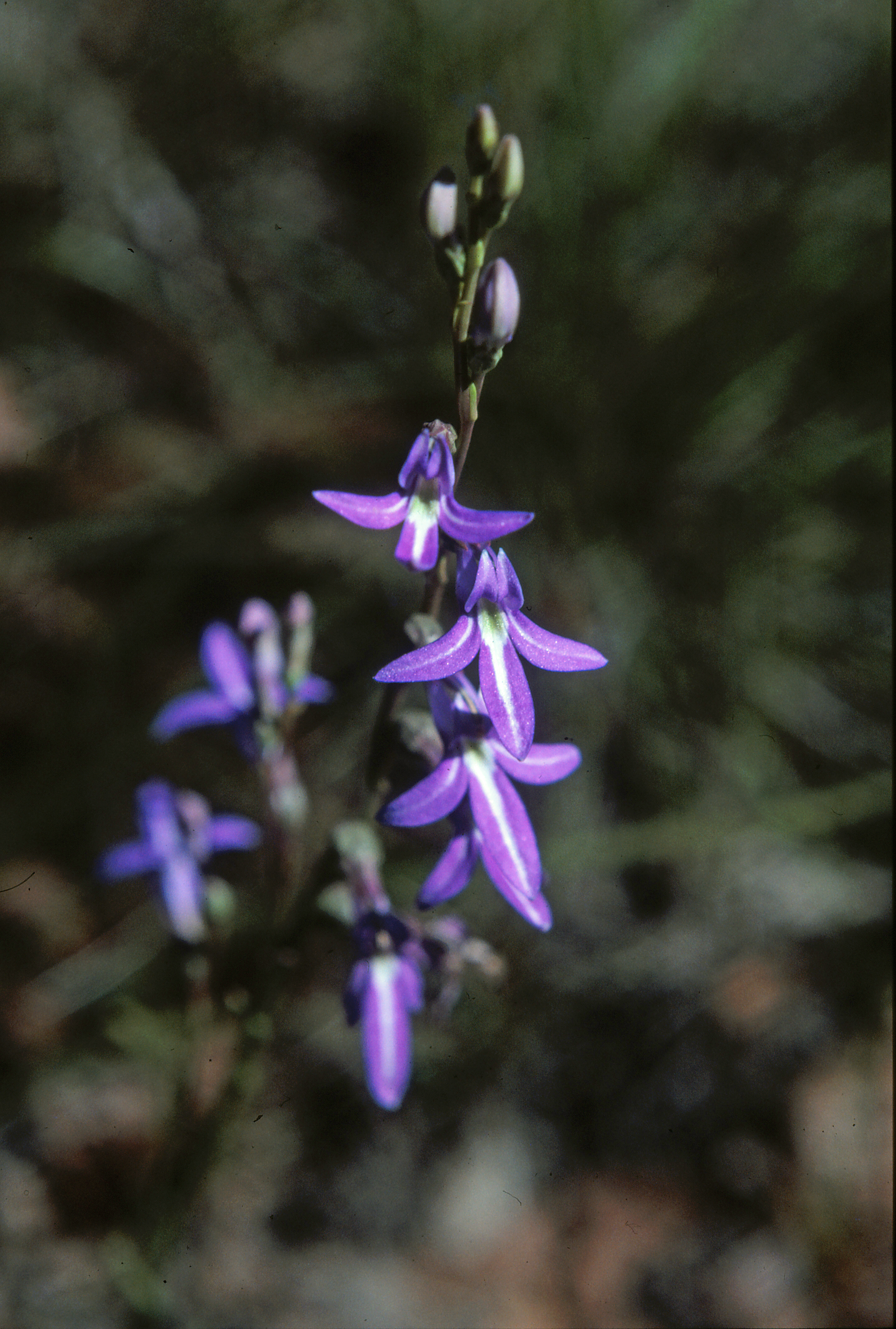

Scientific classification
- Kingdom: Plantae
- Clade: Tracheophytes
- Clade: Angiosperms
- Clade: Eudicots
- Clade: Asterids
- Order: Asterales
- Family: Campanulaceae
- Genus: Lobelia
- Species: L. gibbosa

Binomial name
- Lobelia gibbosa Labill.

= Lobelia gibbosa =

Tall lobelia

Species of flowering plant

Lobelia gibbosa, commonly known as tall lobelia, is a small herbaceous plant in the family Campanulaceae native to Australia.

The annual herb has an erect and slender habit. It typically grows to a height of 0.1 to 0.5 metres (0.3 to 1.6 ft). It blooms between November and March producing blue flowers.

The species is found on dunes and hills, on clay pans and among granite outcrops in the Wheatbelt, Mid West, South West, Great Southern and Goldfields-Esperance regions of Western Australia where it grows in sandy-loam soils.
