= Lobelia archeri =

Conservation status
- Priority One — Poorly Known Taxa (DEC)

Scientific classification
- Kingdom: Plantae
- Clade: Tracheophytes
- Clade: Angiosperms
- Clade: Eudicots
- Clade: Asterids
- Order: Asterales
- Family: Campanulaceae
- Genus: Lobelia
- Species: L. archeri

Binomial name
- Lobelia archeri N.G.Walsh

Species of flowering plant

Lobelia archeri is a small herbaceous plant in the family Campanulaceae native to Western Australia, first described in 2010 by Neville Walsh.

The herb is found in a small area near Esperance in the Goldfields-Esperance region of Western Australia.
