= Lobelia georgiana =

Scientific classification
- Kingdom: Plantae
- Clade: Embryophytes
- Clade: Tracheophytes
- Clade: Spermatophytes
- Clade: Angiosperms
- Clade: Eudicots
- Clade: Asterids
- Order: Asterales
- Family: Campanulaceae
- Genus: Lobelia
- Species: L. georgiana

Binomial name
- Lobelia georgiana McVaugh

Synonyms
- Lobelia amoena var. glandulifera A.Gray; Lobelia amoena var. obtusata A.Gray; Lobelia glandulifera (A.Gray) Small

Species of flowering plant

Lobelia georgiana, the Georgia lobelia, is a species of flowering plant in the family Campanulaceae, native to the southeastern United States. It is likely that the range of Lobelia georgiana only extends to Alabama, Georgia and Florida due to misidentification of specimens.
