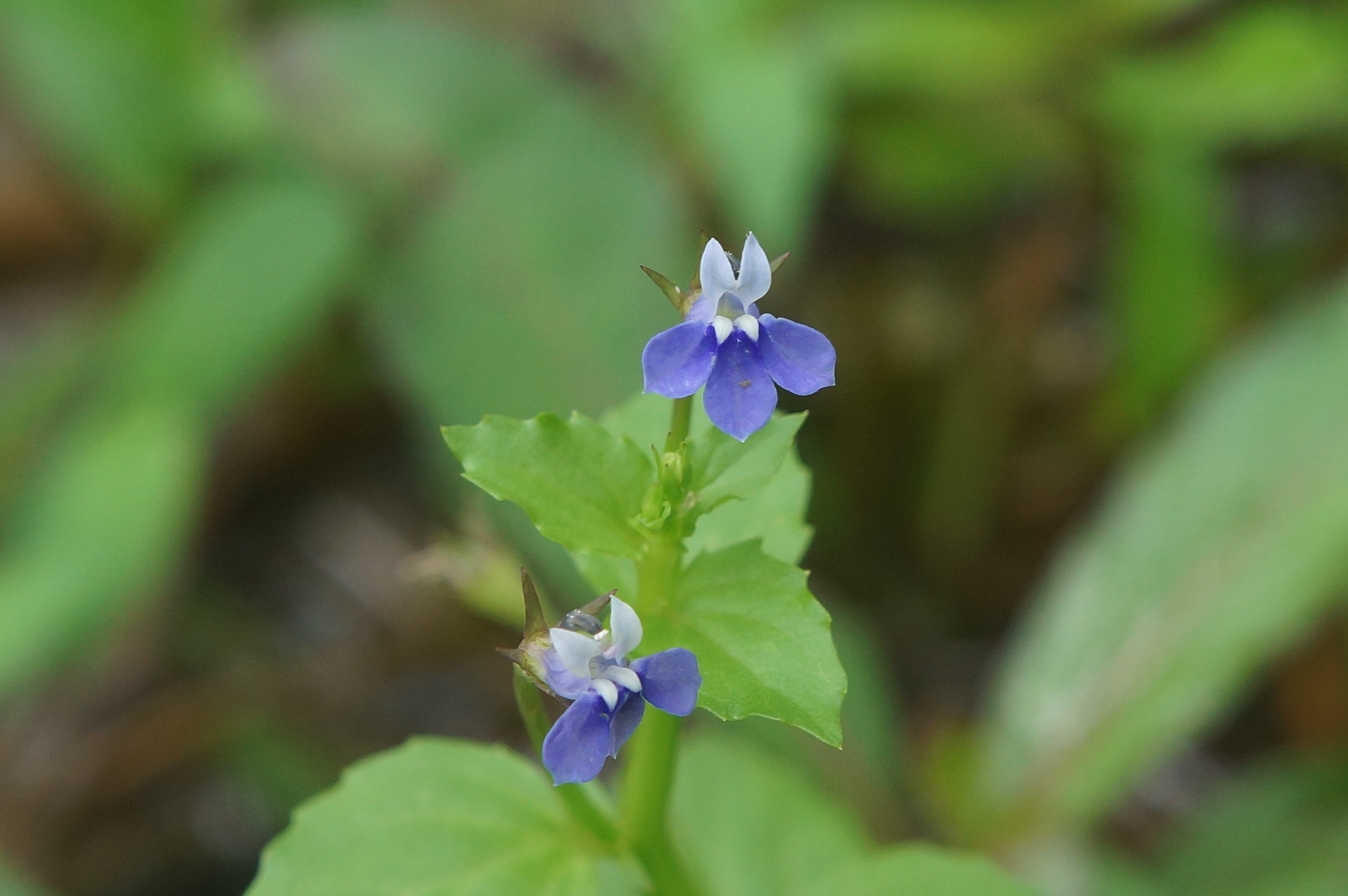
- Lobelia alsinoides, Kozhikode, Kerala

Scientific classification
- Kingdom: Plantae
- Clade: Tracheophytes
- Clade: Angiosperms
- Clade: Eudicots
- Clade: Asterids
- Order: Asterales
- Family: Campanulaceae
- Genus: Lobelia
- Species: L. alsinoides

Binomial name
- Lobelia alsinoides Lam.

= Lobelia alsinoides =

Species of flowering plant

Lobelia alsinoides is a species of plant in the family Campanulaceae.
