= Lobelia cleistogamoides =

Scientific classification
- Kingdom: Plantae
- Clade: Tracheophytes
- Clade: Angiosperms
- Clade: Eudicots
- Clade: Asterids
- Order: Asterales
- Family: Campanulaceae
- Genus: Lobelia
- Species: L. cleistogamoides

Binomial name
- Lobelia cleistogamoides N.G.Walsh & Albr.

Species of flowering plant

Lobelia cleistogamoides is a small herbaceous plant in the family Campanulaceae native to Western Australia, and first described in 2007 by Neville Walsh and David Albrecht.

The herb is found scattered through the Wheatbelt, Mid West and Goldfields-Esperance regions of Western Australia.
