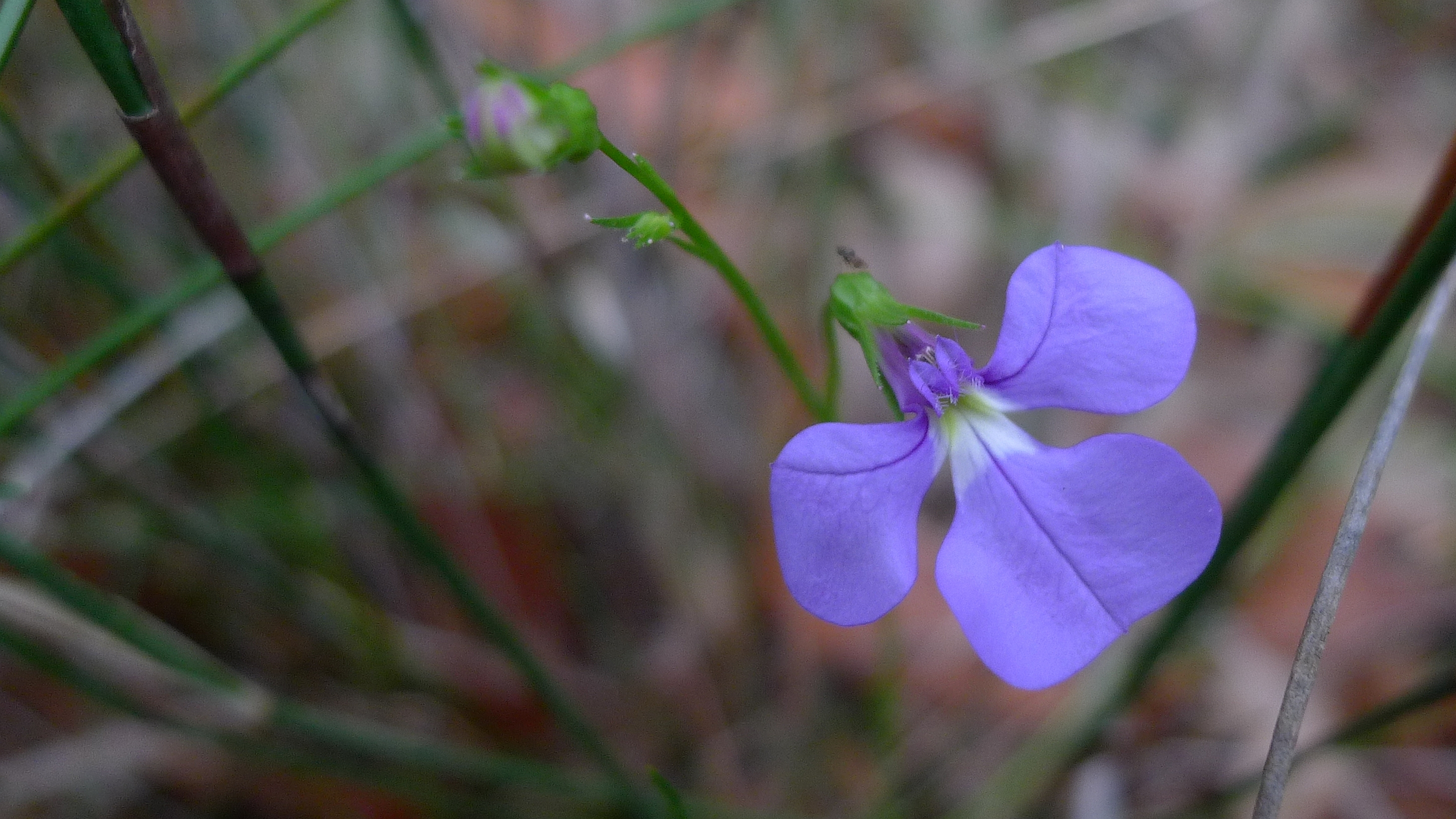

Scientific classification
- Kingdom: Plantae
- Clade: Tracheophytes
- Clade: Angiosperms
- Clade: Eudicots
- Clade: Asterids
- Order: Asterales
- Family: Campanulaceae
- Genus: Lobelia
- Species: L. andrewsii

Binomial name
- Lobelia andrewsii Lammers

= Lobelia andrewsii =

Trailing lobelia

Species of flowering plant

Lobelia andrewsii, commonly known as trailing lobelia, is a small herbaceous, flowering plant in the family Campanulaceae. It has dark blue or purple flowers and grows in New South Wales and Queensland.

== Description ==
Lobelia andrewsii is an upright to horizontally scrambling herb that grows up to 30 cm (12 in) high. The leaves are variable, lower leaves are ovate, upper leaves lance shaped, opposite, becoming linear, leaf margins smooth or toothed, 1–5.5 cm (0.39–2.17 in) long, 2–12 mm (0.079–0.472 in) wide and more or less sessile. The inflorescence consists of up to 12 flowers raceme-like, in a one-side formation and the pedicels up to 20 mm (0.79 in) long. The corolla is violet or deep blue, paler at the base, up to 17 mm (0.67 in) long, the middle lower petal egg-shaped, outer petals egg-shaped or oblong. The two upper petals curve inward and are covered with soft, thin hairs. Flowering occurs from November to July and the fruit is egg-shaped and 3.5–4 mm (0.14–0.16 in) long and diameter.

== Taxonomy and naming ==
Lobelia andrewsii was first formally described in 2001 by Thomas G. Lammers and the description was published in Novon. The specific epithet (andrewsii) honours Henry Cranke Andrews.

== Distribution and habitat ==
Trailing lobelia grows in open forest and mostly on sandy soils north of the Royal National Park, inland to Howell and west of Tenterfield.
