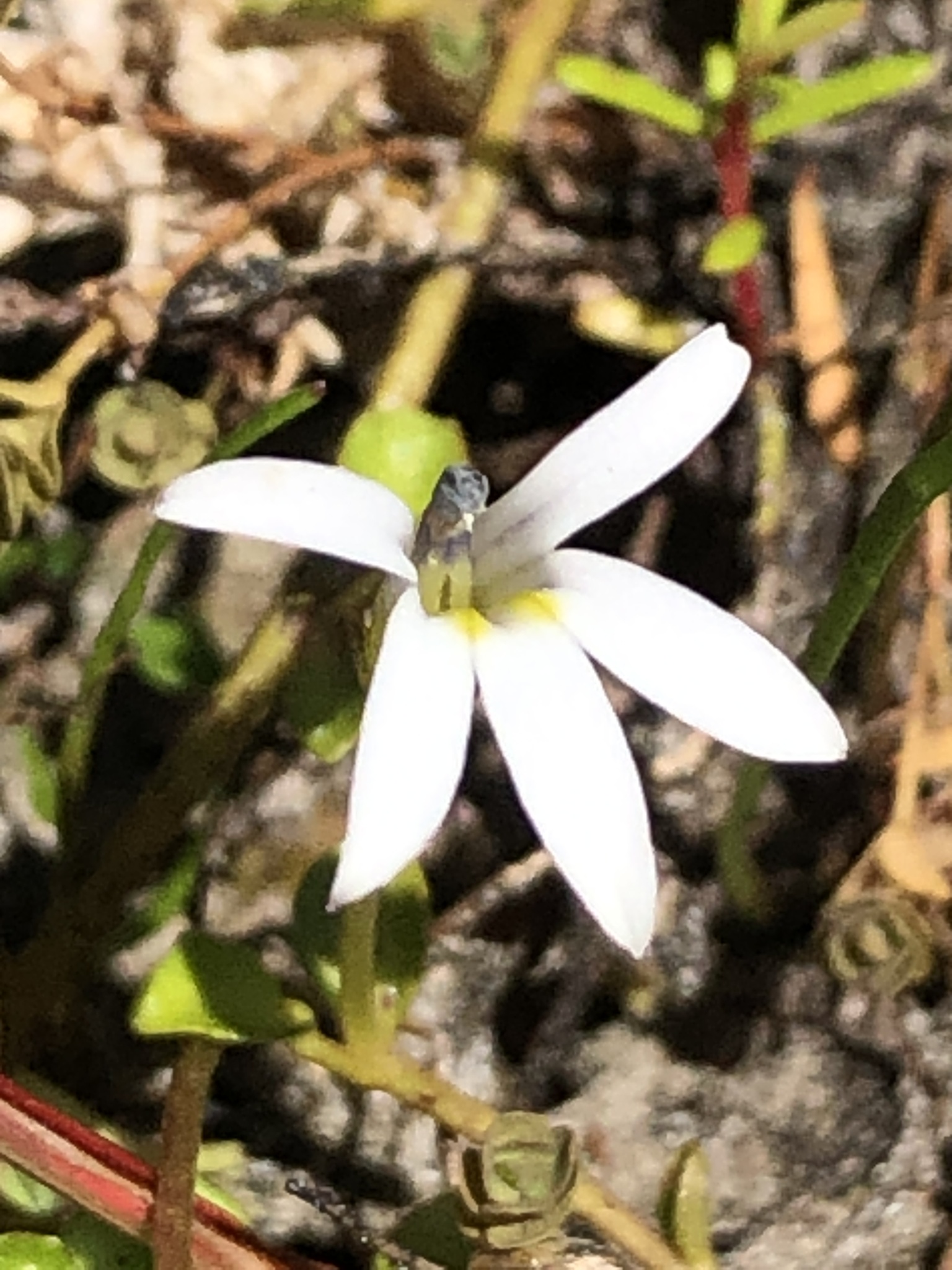
- Lobelia fatiscens in Nelson Lakes National Park

Conservation status
- Naturally Uncommon (NZ TCS)

Scientific classification
- Kingdom: Plantae
- Clade: Embryophytes
- Clade: Tracheophytes
- Clade: Angiosperms
- Clade: Eudicots
- Clade: Asterids
- Order: Asterales
- Family: Campanulaceae
- Genus: Lobelia
- Species: L. fatiscens

Binomial name
- Lobelia fatiscens Heenan

= Lobelia fatiscens =

Species of flowering plant

Lobelia fatiscens is a species of bellflower, endemic to New Zealand.

== Description ==
A small, creeping herb with white flowers. The leaves are glabrous and thin, without significant teeth. The leaf-shape and corolla are important for distinguishing it in the field.

== Distribution and habitat ==
Lobelia fatiscens is known from the South Island of New Zealand, where it is found in Nelson and on the West Coast, as well as near Lake Rotioti in Nelson Lakes National Park.

It generally grows near water or in wet areas, whether the water is standing like lakes, or moving as in rivers, streams, or roadside ditches.

It is at risk, as it inhabits wetlands that may be drained or disturbed and as it has to compete with naturalised species.

== Ecology ==
Lobelia fatiscens can be found amongst stands of kahikatea and kāmahi. Lobelia fatiscens is generally found in wetlands, which means that it and its communities are threatened by wetland drainage and disturbance.

== Etymology ==
The term fatiscens, which means 'disintegrating' in Latin, refers "to the seeds being released by the disintegrating wall of the indehiscent capsule."

== Taxonomy ==
Lobelia fatiscens was recently split from other species, in 2008. It is closely related to Lobelia fugax, which is smaller and has a diploid chromosonal pattern of 2n=14, while L. fatiscens has doubled since the evolutionary split and has a patter of 2n=28. While most specimens are coastal, the population at Lake Rotioti has not been tested to see if it conforms genetically to the others.

The holotype is from a dam near the South Island town of Charleston.
