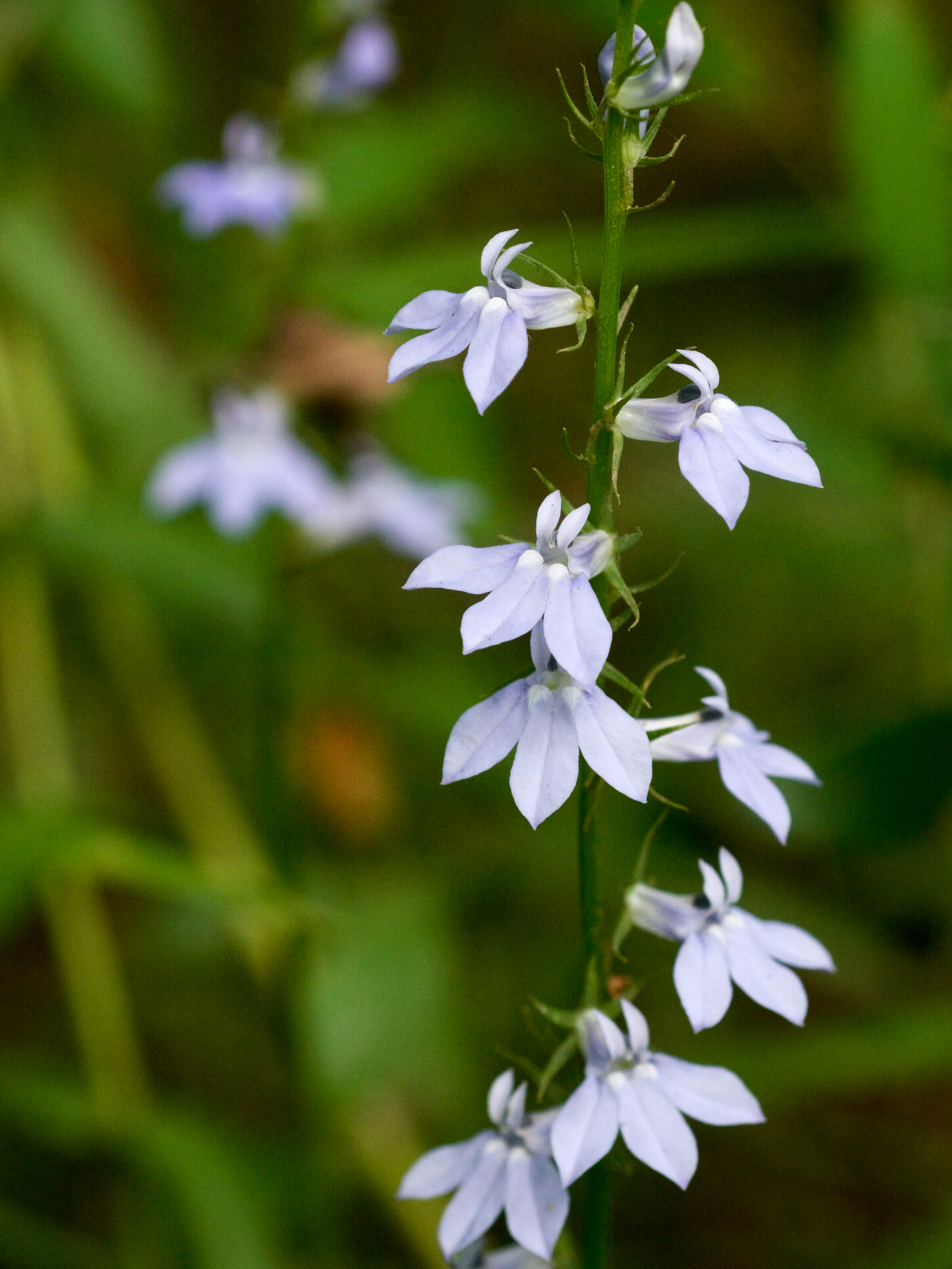

Scientific classification
- Kingdom: Plantae
- Clade: Tracheophytes
- Clade: Angiosperms
- Clade: Eudicots
- Clade: Asterids
- Order: Asterales
- Family: Campanulaceae
- Genus: Lobelia
- Species: L. appendiculata

Binomial name
- Lobelia appendiculata A.DC.

= Lobelia appendiculata =

Species of flowering plant

Lobelia appendiculata is a species of flowering plant in the bellflower family known by the common name pale lobelia. It is found in the south-central portion of North America. It is an annual herb growing up to 2 ft (0.61 m) tall.
