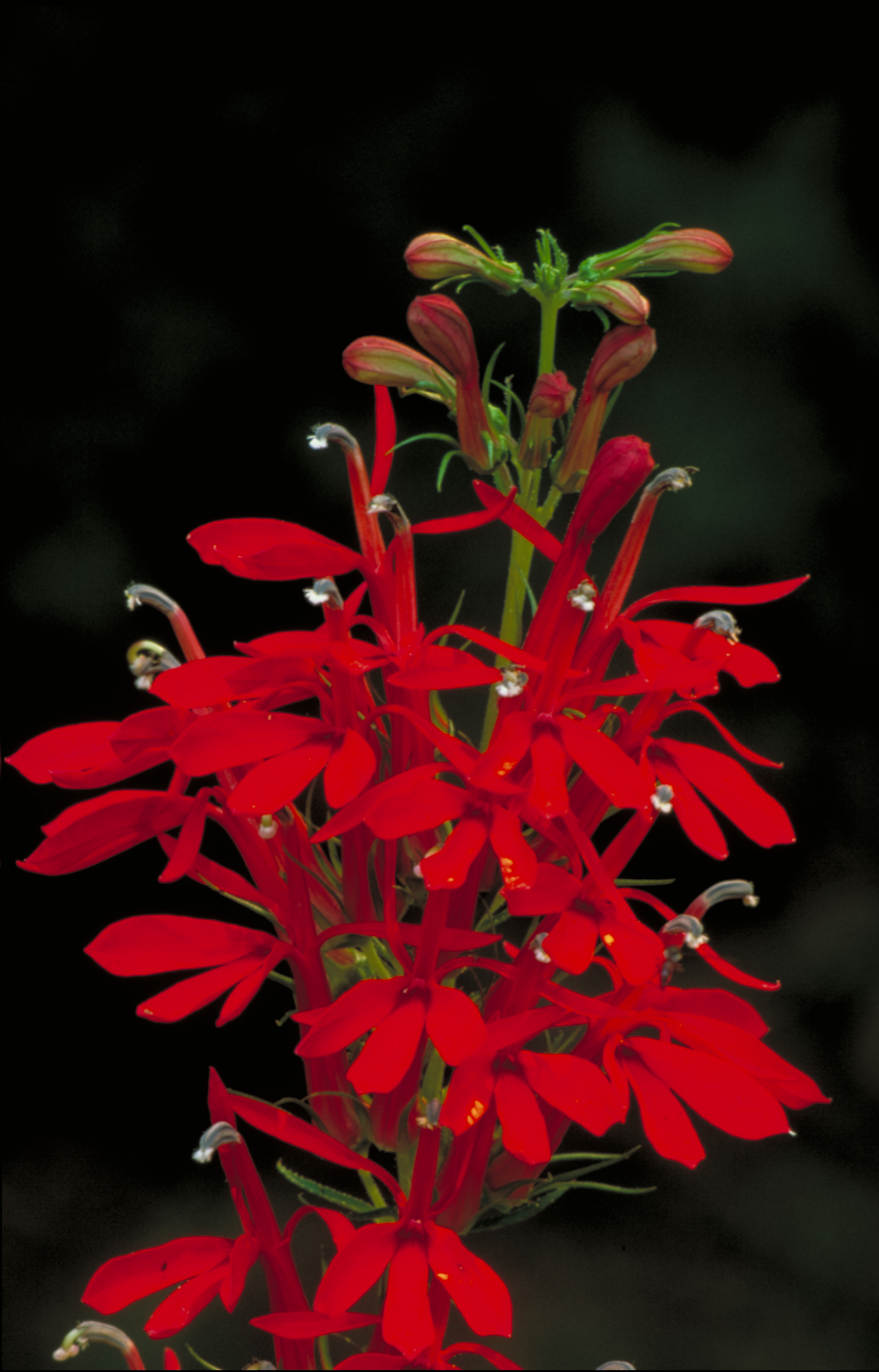

Conservation status
- Least Concern (IUCN 3.1)

- Secure (NatureServe)

Scientific classification
- Kingdom: Plantae
- Clade: Tracheophytes
- Clade: Angiosperms
- Clade: Eudicots
- Clade: Asterids
- Order: Asterales
- Family: Campanulaceae
- Genus: Lobelia
- Species: L. cardinalis

Binomial name
- Lobelia cardinalis L.

Synonyms
- List: Dortmanna cardinalis (L.) Kuntze; Dortmanna cordigera (Cav.) Kuntze; Dortmanna engelmanniana Kuntze; Dortmanna fulgens (Humb. & Bonpl. ex Willd.) Kuntze; Dortmanna graminea (Lam.) Kuntze; Dortmanna longifolia (C.Presl) Kuntze; Dortmanna phyllostachya (Engelm.) Kuntze; Dortmanna splendens (Humb. & Bonpl. ex Willd.) Kuntze; Lobelia cardinalis f. alba (J.McNab) H.St.John; Lobelia cardinalis var. alba J.McNab; Lobelia cardinalis var. angustifolia Vatke; Lobelia cardinalis var. candida Alph.Wood; Lobelia cardinalis f. cordigera (Cav.) Bowden; Lobelia cardinalis var. glandulosa N.Coleman; Lobelia cardinalis var. graminea (Lam.) McVaugh; Lobelia cardinalis subsp. graminea (Lam.) McVaugh; Lobelia cardinalis var. hispidula E.Wimm.; Lobelia cardinalis f. hispidula (E.Wimm.) Bowden; Lobelia cardinalis var. integerrima Alph.Wood; Lobelia cardinalis var. meridionalis Bowden; Lobelia cardinalis var. multiflora (Paxton) McVaugh; Lobelia cardinalis var. phyllostachya (Engelm.) McVaugh; Lobelia cardinalis var. propinqua (Paxton) Bowden; Lobelia cardinalis var. pseudosplendens McVaugh; Lobelia cardinalis f. rosea H.St.John; Lobelia cardinalis var. texensis (Raf.) Rothr.; Lobelia coccinea (Moench) Stokes; Lobelia cordigera Cav.; Lobelia cordigera var. fatalis E.Wimm.; Lobelia cordigera var. marryattiae (Paxton) E.Wimm.; Lobelia cordigera var. multiflora (Paxton) E.Wimm.; Lobelia fulgens Humb. & Bonpl. ex Willd.; Lobelia fulgens f. atrosanguinea (Hook.) Voss; Lobelia fulgens var. multiflora Paxton; Lobelia fulgens var. propinqua Paxton; Lobelia fulgens var. pyramidalis Paxton; Lobelia graminea Lam.; Lobelia graminea var. intermedia E.Wimm.; Lobelia graminea f. kerneri (L.Nagy) E.Wimm.; Lobelia graminea var. phyllostachya (Engelm.) E.Wimm.; Lobelia ignea Paxton; Lobelia kerneri L.Nagy; Lobelia longifolia (C.Presl) A.DC.; Lobelia marryattiae Paxton; Lobelia mucronata Engelm.; Lobelia phyllostachya Engelm.; Lobelia porphyrantha Decne. ex Groenland; Lobelia princeps Otto & A.Dietr.; Lobelia propinqua J.W.Loudon; Lobelia punicea Otto & A.Dietr.; Lobelia punicea var. kerneri (L.Nagy) E.Wimm.; Lobelia ramosa Burb.; Lobelia schiedeana Heynh.; Lobelia splendens Humb. & Bonpl. ex Willd.; Lobelia splendens var. atrosanguinea Hook.; Lobelia splendens var. fulgens (Humb. & Bonpl. ex Willd.) S.Watson; Lobelia splendens var. ignea Hook.; Lobelia texensis Raf.; Rapuntium cardinale (L.) Mill.; Rapuntium coccineum Moench; Rapuntium cordigerum (Cav.) C.Presl; Rapuntium fulgens (Humb. & Bonpl. ex Willd.) C.Presl; Rapuntium gramineum (Lam.) C.Presl; Rapuntium longifolium C.Presl; Rapuntium splendens (Humb. & Bonpl. ex Willd.) C.Presl; Tupa ignescens Payer

= Lobelia cardinalis =

Species of flowering plant

Lobelia cardinalis, the cardinal flower (syn. L. fulgens), is a species of flowering plant in the bellflower family Campanulaceae native to the Americas, from southeastern Canada south through the eastern and southwestern United States, Mexico and Central America to northern Colombia.

== Description and habitat ==
Lobelia cardinalis is a perennial herbaceous plant which grows up to 1.2 m (4 ft) tall. It is found primarily in wet places, such as riparian zones, riverbanks, bogs or swamps. It is also sometimes found in damp or semi-flooded and shaded forest areas. The plant tends to occupy locations near a water source, providing its roots with consistent hydration via groundwater from the saturated soil. It may be found growing slightly away from or closer to the water, and may even be found growing aquatically, with some or all of the plant submerged and its flowers rising from the surface.

The leaves are up to 20 cm (8 in) long and 5 cm (2 in) broad, lanceolate to oval, featuring a toothed margin. The flowers are usually vibrant red, have five deep lobes, and are up to 4 cm across; they are produced via an erect raceme, up to 70 cm (28 in) tall, during the summer and into the fall. Some forms with white (f. alba) and pink (f. rosea) flowers are also known.

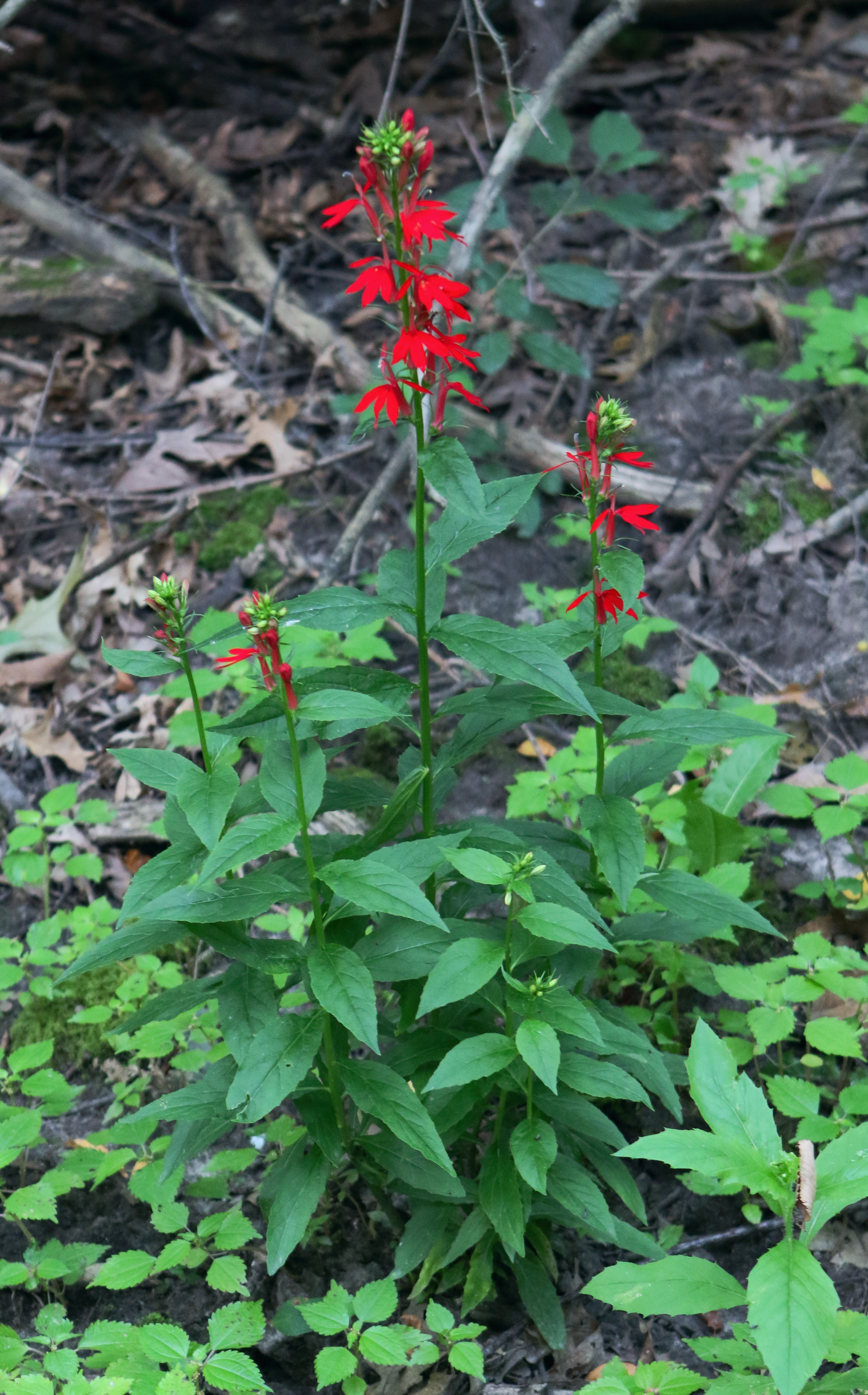

L. cardinalis is related to two other Lobelia species found in the Eastern United States, Lobelia inflata ('Indian tobacco') and Lobelia siphilitica ('great lobelia'). As is typical of the genus, all display the characteristic "lip" petal near the opening of the flower and a "milky" secretion when the plant is broken. L. siphilitica has blue flowers and is primarily pollinated by bees, whereas L. cardinalis is red, and is primarily pollinated by the ruby-throated hummingbird (Archilochus colubris).

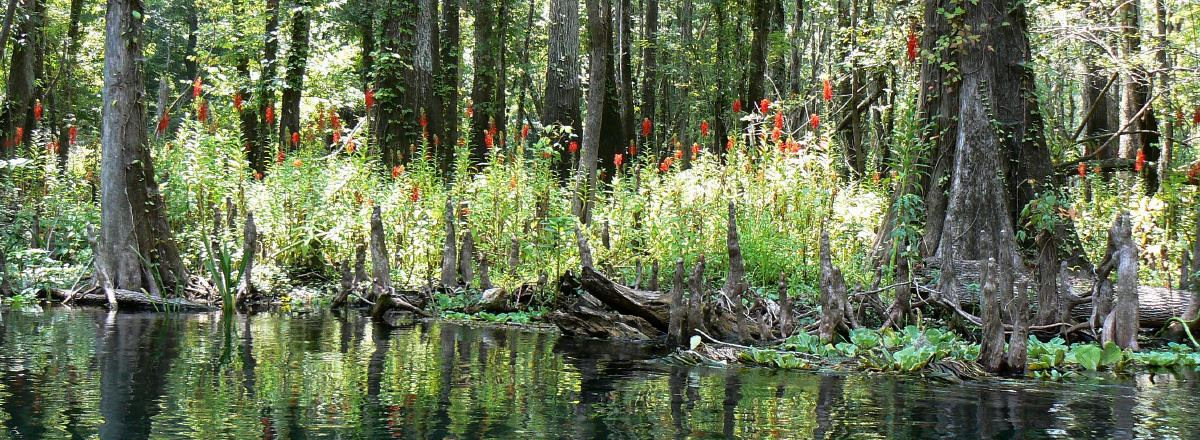
L. cardinalis on the banks of the Ichetucknee River, Columbia County, Florida

== Etymology ==
Lobelia cardinalis was first introduced to Europe in the mid-1620s; the name 'cardinal flower' was in use by 1629, likely due to the similarity of the flower's color to the vesture of Roman Catholic Cardinals.

== Growing and cultivars ==
In cultivation, L. cardinalis requires rich, fairly deep soil which remains reliably moist—yet sufficiently aerated—all year-round; alternatively, it may be grown as an accent plant in or along ponds, fountains or other garden water features, with its pot positioned so it can always access water. If not planted in or around a water source, L. cardinalis tends to prefer for its roots to stay cool, something achieved when grown in dappled sun or part shade. The cultivar 'Queen Victoria' has gained the Royal Horticultural Society's Award of Garden Merit.

This plant is easily propagated by seed or by dividing-out the young plants, which are seen forming around the older, more mature plants each year. Although the plant is generally considered a perennial, they may be short-lived, or behave more as a "long-term annual".

Within the freshwater planted aquarium and aquascaping hobbies, the species is used somewhat frequently. At least one new variety has been developed and is available commercially, Lobelia cardinalis 'Mini', with small and compact green leaves.

== Medicinal and other uses ==
The Zuni people use this plant as an ingredient of "schumaakwe cakes" and used it externally for rheumatism and swelling. The Penobscot people smoked the dried leaves as a substitute for tobacco. It may also have been chewed.

== Toxicity ==
As a member of the Lobelia genus, L. cardinalis contains a number of naturally occurring, toxic alkaloids, including lobelanine and lobeline, thus rendering the species potentially harmful if ingested. Various negative physical symptoms may manifest upon consuming even small or mid-sized quantities of the plant, including nausea, vomiting, diarrhea, excessive salivation, fatigue/exhaustion, weakness, dilation of pupils, convulsions, and even coma.
