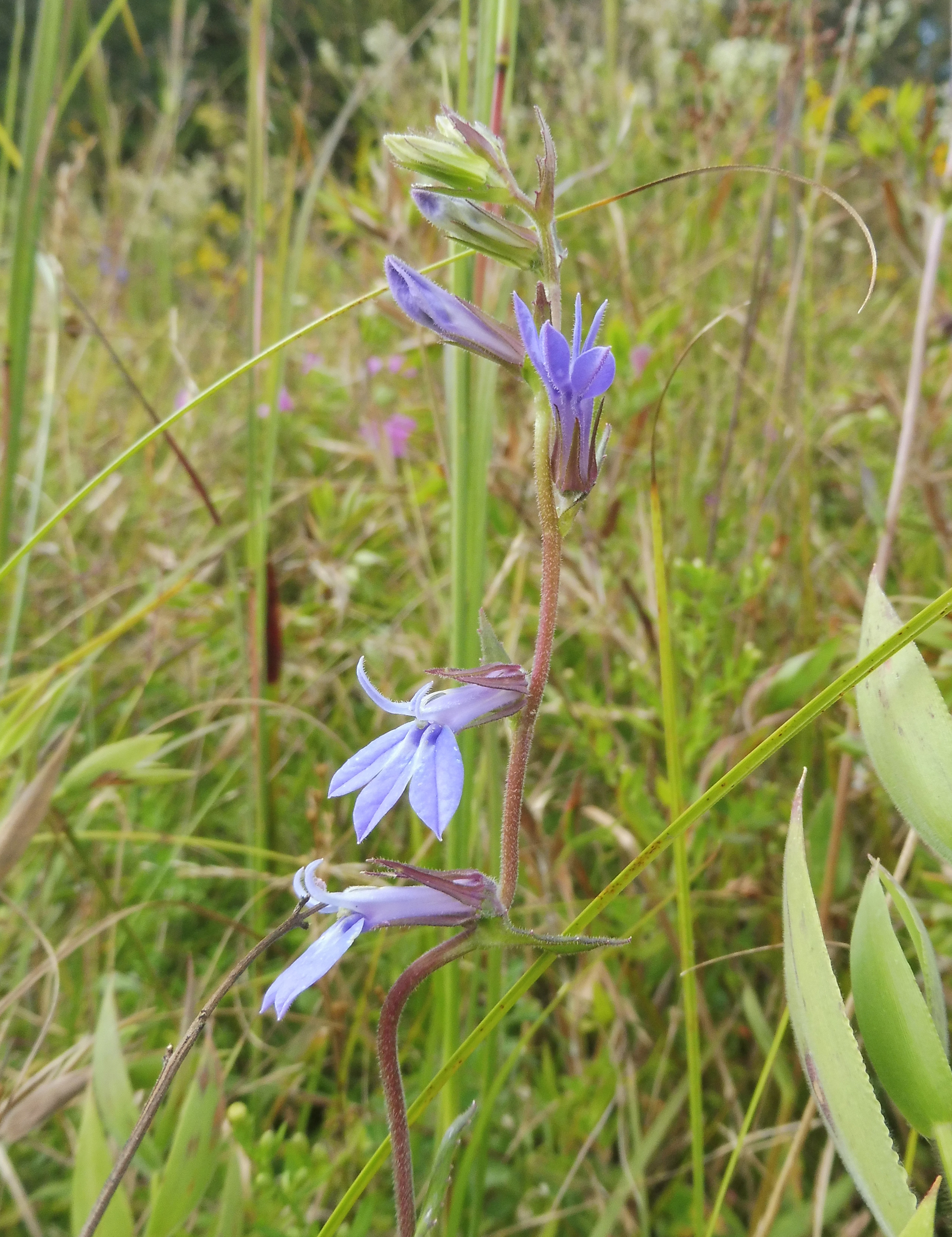

Scientific classification
- Kingdom: Plantae
- Clade: Embryophytes
- Clade: Tracheophytes
- Clade: Spermatophytes
- Clade: Angiosperms
- Clade: Eudicots
- Clade: Asterids
- Order: Asterales
- Family: Campanulaceae
- Genus: Lobelia
- Species: L. puberula

Binomial name
- Lobelia puberula Michx.

= Lobelia puberula =

Species of flowering plant

Lobelia puberula, or downy lobelia, is a perennial herbaceous wildflower in the Bellflower family (Campanulaceae) native to eastern and south central United States. It is the most common blue-flowered Lobelia in the Southeast. It grows in mesic (moderate moisture) to hydric (moist) habitats in sun or partial shade.

== Description ==
Downy lobelia is a perennial herb that grows up to 2.5 ft (1 m) tall. Leaves are simple with a toothed margin. The flowers are blue to violet, five-lobed, and bloom from July to October.

Lobelia puberula is similar to two other Lobelia species in to the Eastern United States, Lobelia inflata (Indian tobacco) and Lobelia siphilitica (great lobelia); all display the characteristic "lip" petal near the opening of the flower and the "milky" liquid the plant excretes.

== Ecology ==
Lobelia puberula is insect pollinated and is recorded to have been visited in northern Florida by Augochloropsis metallica, Bombus pensylvanicus, and Lasioglossum reticulatum.
