= Pratia =

Genus of plants

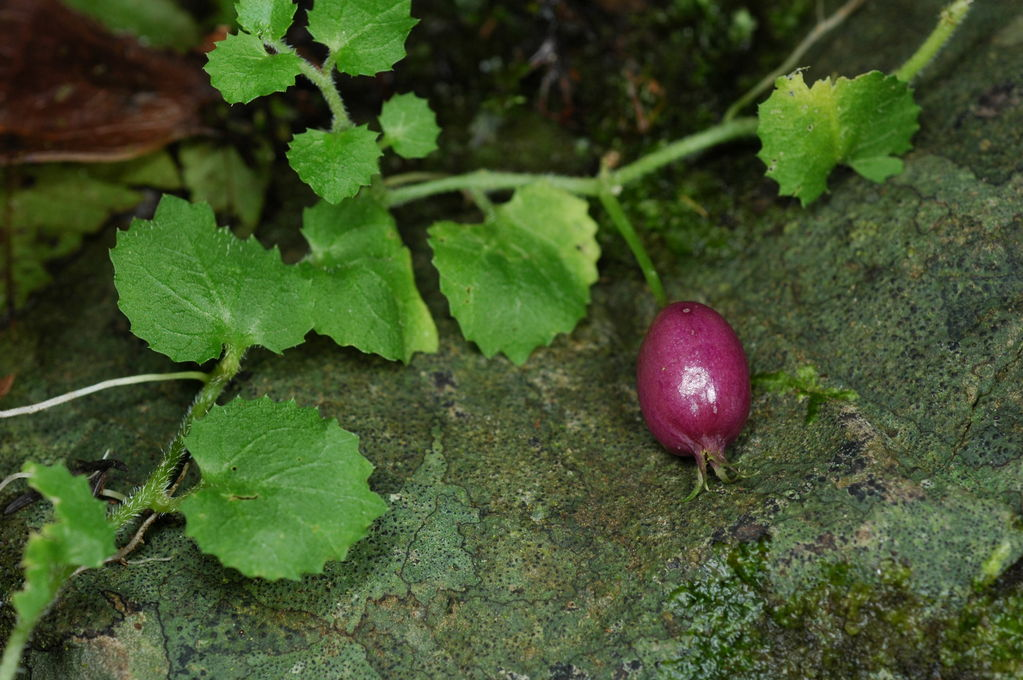
Pratia nummularia.jpg

Pratia is a formerly recognized genus of flowering plants in the family Campanulaceae, native to Asia, Australia and New Zealand. Along with other genera, such as Hypsela and Isotoma, it is now included in Lobelia.

Former species include:

- Pratia angulata (G.Forst.) Hook.f., now Lobelia angulata, native to New Zealand
- Pratia concolor (R.Br.) Druce, now Lobelia concolor (poison pratia), native to Australia - New South Wales, Queensland, South Australia and Victoria
- Pratia pedunculata (R.Br.) Benth., now Lobelia pedunculata, native to Australia - New South Wales, South Australia, Tasmania and Victoria
- Pratia purpurascens (R.Br.) E.Wimm., now Lobelia purpurascens, native to Australia
