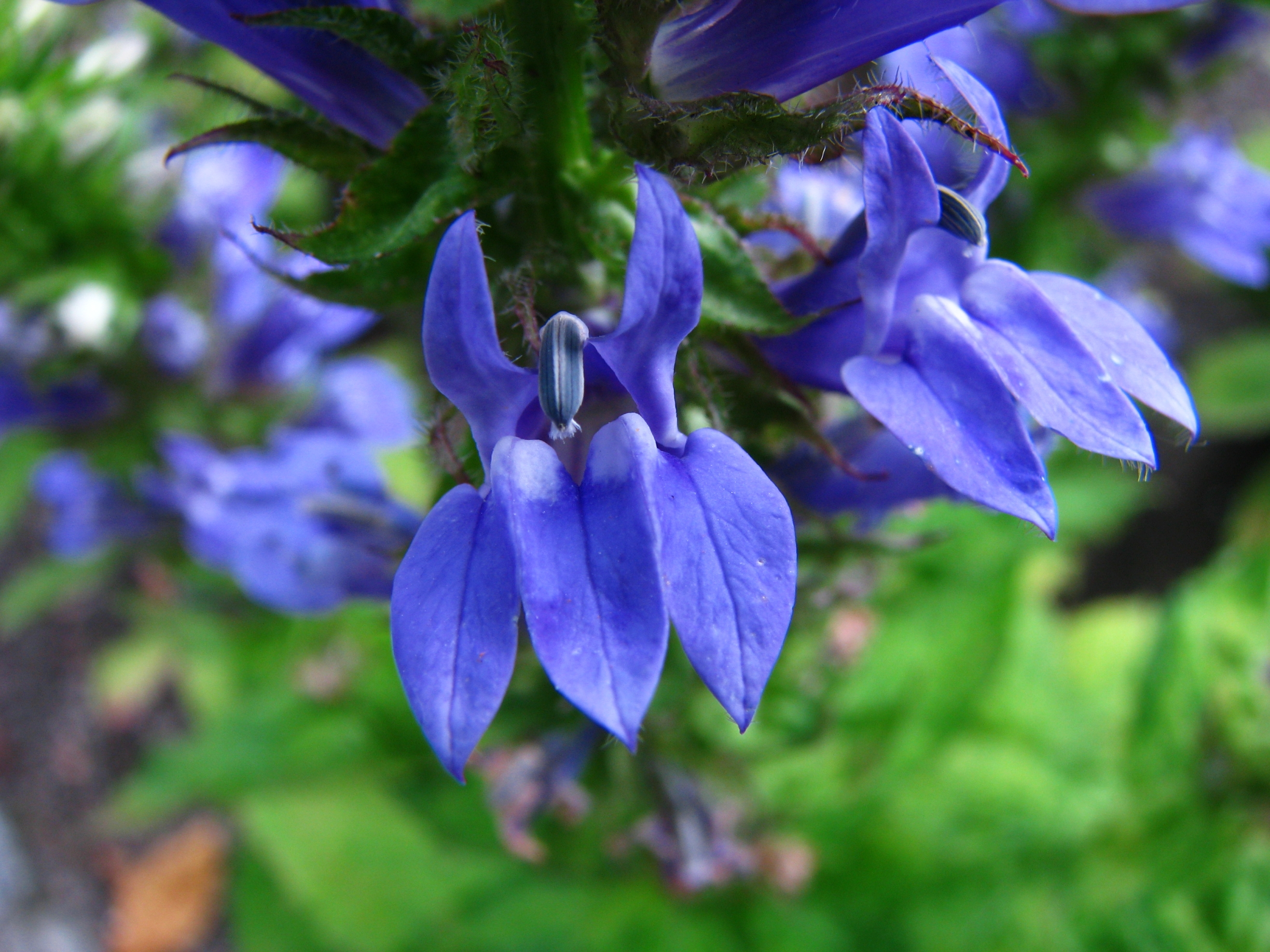
- Lobelia siphilitica

Scientific classification
- Kingdom: Plantae
- Clade: Tracheophytes
- Clade: Angiosperms
- Clade: Eudicots
- Clade: Asterids
- Order: Asterales
- Family: Campanulaceae
- Subfamily: Lobelioideae; Burnett

Genera
- See text

= Lobelioideae =

Subfamily of flowering plants

Lobelioideae is a subfamily of the plant family Campanulaceae. It contains 32 genera, totalling about 1200 species. Some of the larger genera are Lobelia, Siphocampylus, Centropogon, Burmeistera and Cyanea.

They are perennials, sometimes annuals, ranging in form from herbs to small trees. Most species are tropical in distribution, but in total this subfamily occurs almost worldwide, being absent only from Arctic regions, central Asia and the Near East. The subfamily is particularly diverse in Hawaii, where well over 100 species of Hawaiian lobelioids have radiated from a single introduction.

This subfamily was formerly given family rank as Lobeliaceae, under a somewhat different circumscription.

The leaves are simple and alternate. The plants have milky sap. The flowers are bilaterally symmetric with five lobes and stamens. The corolla tube opens along the upper side with two lobes above and three below, and the stamens join together in the tube.

== Genera ==
- Brighamia A.Gray
- Burmeistera H.Karst. & Triana
- Calcaratolobelia Wilbur
- Centropogon C.Presl
- Clermontia Gaudich.
- Cyanea Gaudich.
- Delissea Gaudich.
- Dialypetalum Benth.
- Diastatea Scheidw.
- Dielsantha E.Wimm.
- Downingia Torr.
- Grammatotheca C.Presl
- Heterotoma Zucc.
- Hippobroma G.Don
- Howellia A.Gray
- Hypsela C.Presl
- Isotoma (R.Br.) Lindl.
- Legenere McVaugh
- Lobelia L.
- Lysipomia Kunth
- Monopsis Salisb.
- Palmerella A.Gray
- Porterella Torr.
- Pratia Gaudich.
- Ruthiella Steenis
- Sclerotheca A.DC.
- Siphocampylus Pohl
- Solenopsis C.Presl
- Trematolobelia Zahlbr. ex Rock
- Unigenes E.Wimm.
