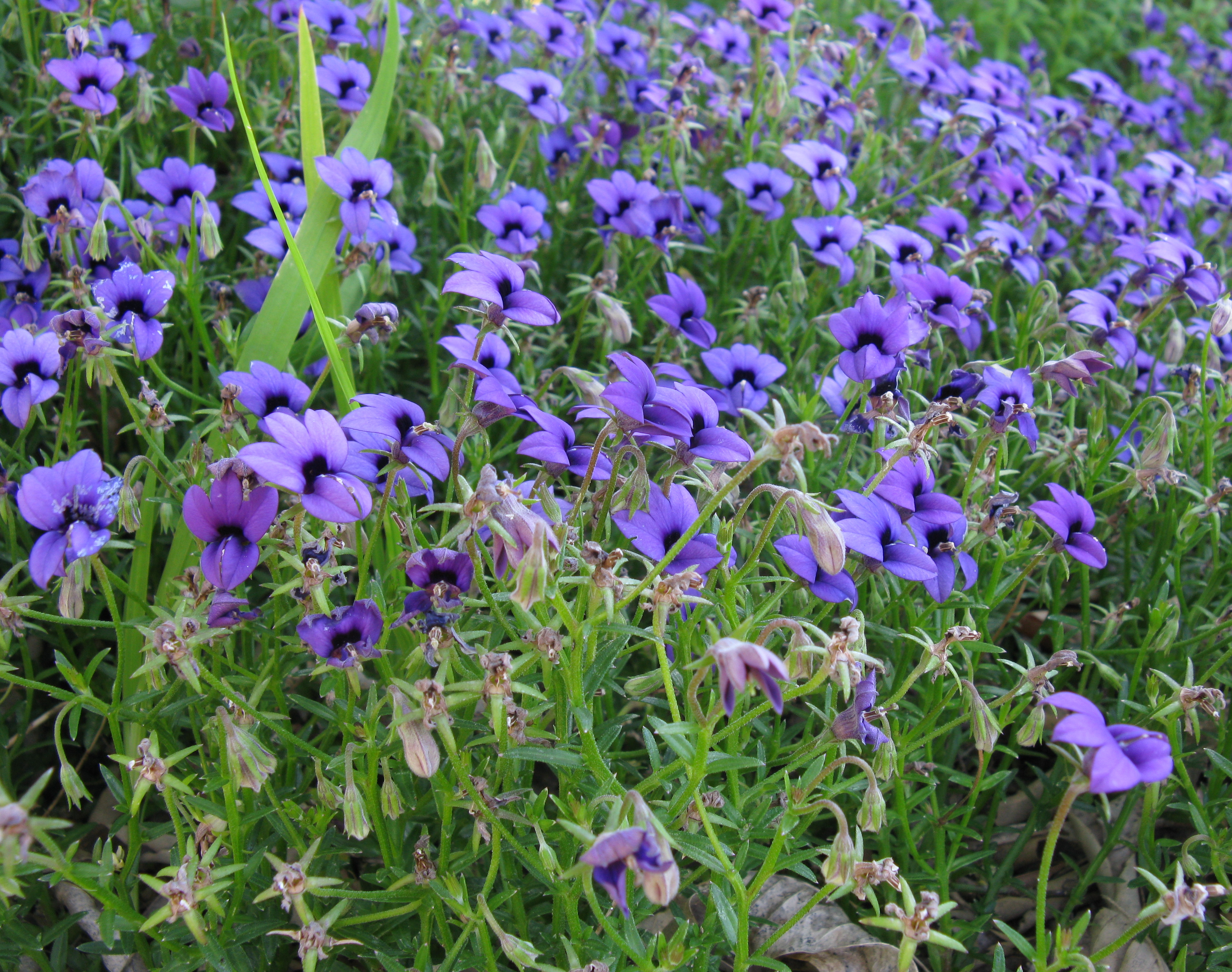
- Monopsis unidentata

Scientific classification
- Kingdom: Plantae
- Clade: Tracheophytes
- Clade: Angiosperms
- Clade: Eudicots
- Clade: Asterids
- Order: Asterales
- Family: Campanulaceae
- Subfamily: Lobelioideae
- Genus: Monopsis; Salisb. (1817)

Species
- 15; see text

Synonyms
- Dobrowskya C.Presl (1836); Mezleria C.Presl (1836); Parastranthus G.Don (1834)

= Monopsis =

Genus of flowering plants

Monopsis is a genus of small, Lobelia-like herbaceous plants indigenous to Africa. A few species are annuals, but most are perennials. Common names are not well established, but often refer to more familiar plants, as in "wild violet" for Monopsis unidentata, "yellow lobelia" for Monopsis lutea or "pansy lobelia" for Monopsis debilis.

== Description ==
Their stems are variously but irregularly branched and in many species are prostrate and creeping, rooting at nodes. Such species are horticulturally useful components of flat ground cover.

The leaf placement or phyllotaxis of the various species also varies, being either opposite or alternate, depending on the species. The leaves are fairly small and generally lightly to markedly toothed. In shape the leaves are simple, and those of various species vary from elliptic, through lanceolate, to short linear.

The flowers may be borne in terminal racemes or spikes, but most species bear numerous solitary flowers on pedicels in leaf axils. The pedicels generally twist in such a manner as to present the three-petalled lip uppermost, though in some species such as Monopsis decipiens the two-petalled lip is usually on top. Consistency on this respect is most likely an adaptation to favour preferred pollinators, as it permits them to perform their functions most efficiently, both for the plant and for their own reproductive success. Most species have flowers of either yellow or purple; the colours being vibrant and intense, much like those of many of the Lobelia species. A few have flowers of various intermediate colours such as salmon. Flowers of some species, such as Monopsis decipiens are colourfully patterned. Some species have white flowers.

The calyx has five lobes, its tube being fused to the ovary. The corolla has five petals, the corolla tube of most species being split nearly to its base, forming two lips or lobes. The upper lip has three of the petals, the lower lip the remaining two. In some species the petals of the two-part lip are nearly fully fused, but in others they are nearly completely split.

There are five stamens; in some species they are free from the tube of the corolla, but in others they grow from near the base of the tube. The anthers, and in some species the upper parts of the filaments of the stamens, are joined into a ring around the style. The tips of the anthers are bearded with little brushes of white hair.

The ovary is inferior and more or less fused to the calyx; it has two locules, each containing many small ovules. The style is thread-like, bent, and divides into slender, elongated flat stigmas that are hairy at their bases and protrude from the ring of anthers. The seed capsule has two valves and splits loculicidally.

== Distribution ==
The genus is native to the continent of Africa, all but two of the described species occurring mainly within Southern Africa, and one species being present also on the Comoro Islands. Most are those are endemic to Southern Africa, about half of them being fynbos species.

== Taxonomy ==
15 species are accepted.

- Monopsis acrodon E.Wimm.
- Monopsis alba Phillipson
- Monopsis belliflora E.Wimm.
- Monopsis debilis (L.f.) C.Presl
- Monopsis decipiens (Sond.) Thulin
- Monopsis flava (C.Presl) E.Wimm.
- Monopsis kowynensis E.Wimm.
- Monopsis lutea (L.) Urb.
- Monopsis malvacea E.Wimm.
- Monopsis scabra (Thunb.) Urb.
- Monopsis simplex (L.) E.Wimm.
- Monopsis stellarioides (C.Presl) Urb.
- Monopsis unidentata (Dryand.) E.Wimm.
- Monopsis variifolia (Sims) Urb.
- Monopsis zeyheri (Sond.) Thulin

The taxonomy, nomenclature and infraspecific variation of Monopsis debilis was discussed in Phillipson (1986), and that of Monopsis unidentata was discussed in Phillipson (1989).

== Horticulture ==
Many of the species are desirable as informal plants because of their unobtrusive habit, simple maintenance, and vivid colours. They already were being recommended as garden ornamentals in the early nineteenth century. The creeping species such as Monopsis lutea and Monopsis flava are horticulturally useful components of flat ground cover and can be included in suitable lawns as inoffensive flowering plants among the grass. Bushier species such as Monopsis unidentata do well as deeper ground covers in damp spots or in beds and pots as well as fillers in nooks and crannies in gardens where many other more formal plants either are troublesome or refuse to grow satisfactorily. Both types are rewarding in walls and hanging baskets.

In some regions at least, Monopsis species are recognised as desirable in bird-friendly gardens.
