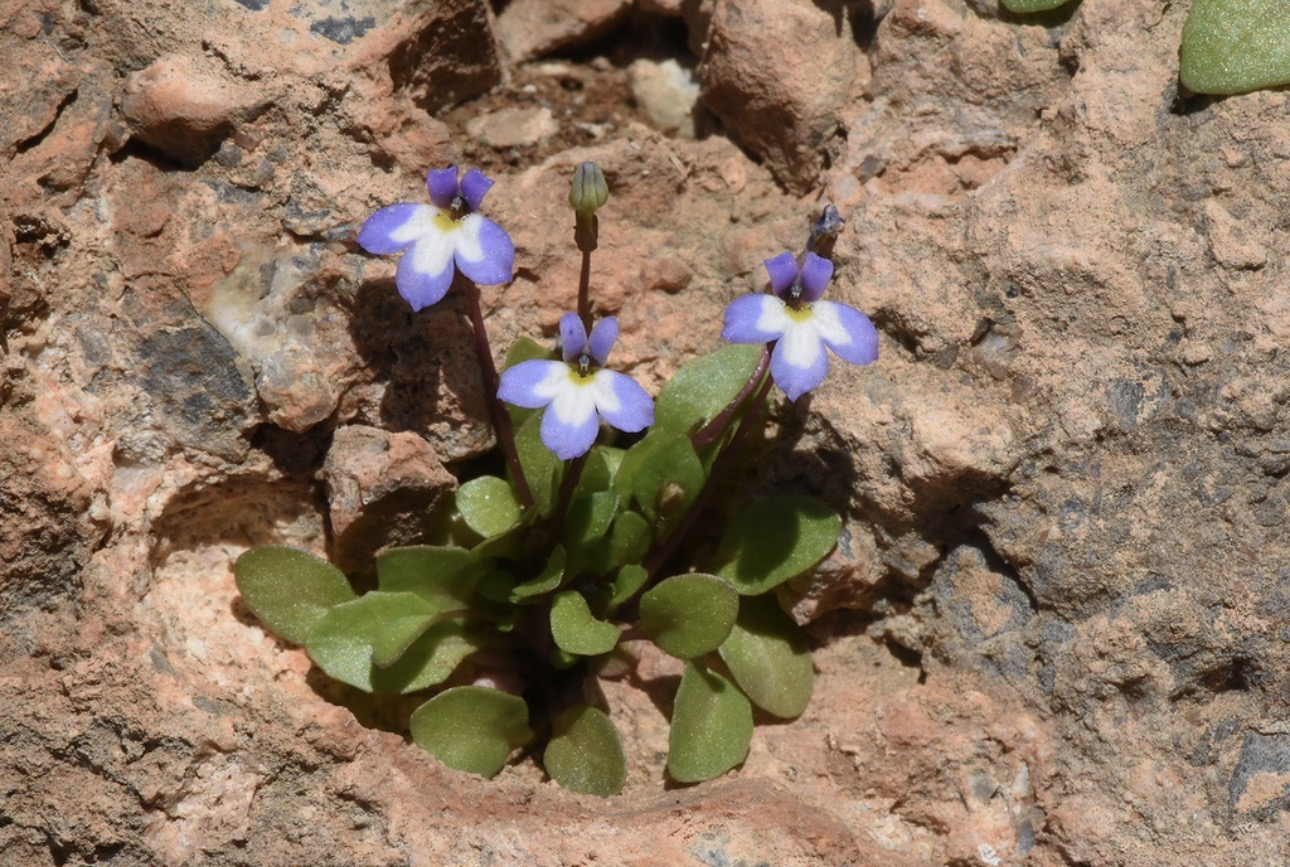

Scientific classification
- Kingdom: Plantae
- Clade: Tracheophytes
- Clade: Angiosperms
- Clade: Eudicots
- Clade: Asterids
- Order: Asterales
- Family: Campanulaceae
- Genus: Solenopsis
- Species: S. sphaciotica

Binomial name
- Solenopsis sphaciotica Cambria, Giusso, Minissale & Brullo
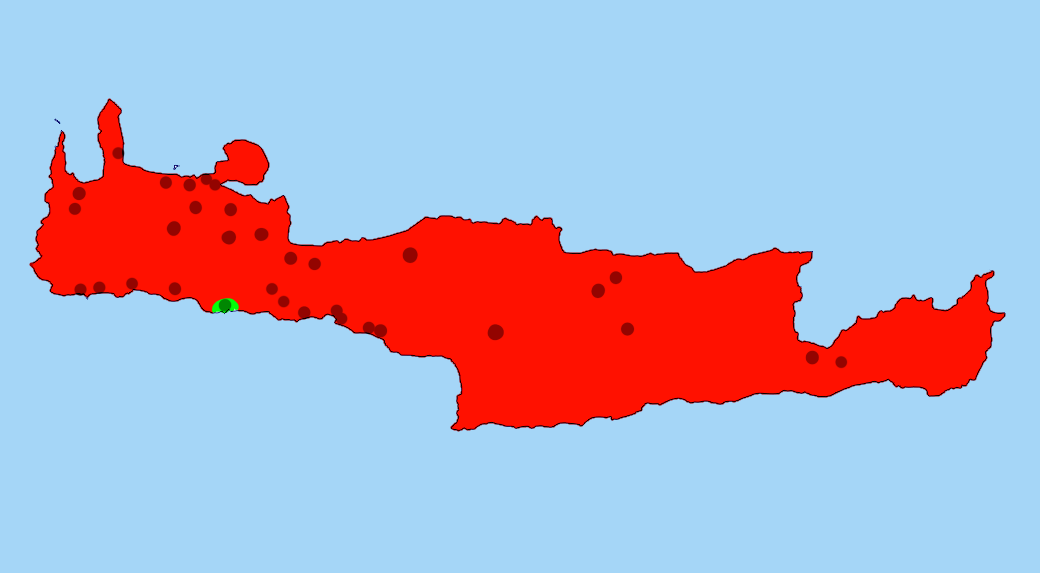
- S. sphaciotica S. minuta (Crete) Darker colour shows known localities*

= Solenopsis sphaciotica =

Species of flowering plant

Solenopsis sphaciotica is a species of flowering plant in the bellflower family Campanulaceae. It is a small annual herb endemic to the island of Crete, Greece, where it grows on seasonally dripping coastal limestone cliffs. The species is known from a single population near Hora Sfakion in the southwestern part of the island.

== Description ==
Solenopsis sphaciotica is a diminutive annual herb with a fibrous root system. Plants are acaulescent or briefly scapose and form a basal rosette typically 1.2 to 2 centimeters in diameter. The leaves are spathulate to oblanceolate, measuring 4 to 12 millimeters in total length. The leaf blade is 2 to 5.5 millimeters long and 1.2 to 3 millimeters wide, with an entire to weakly crenate margin that lacks glands. The petiole ranges from 2 to 8 millimeters in length. Leaf surfaces are glabrous.

Floral pedicels arise from the base of the rosette and measure 15 to 45 millimeters in length. Each pedicel bears two bracteoles that are 1.5 to 2.7 millimeters long and 0.2 to 0.3 millimeters wide. The bracteoles possess four to eight hairs in their upper half, including one apical hair and two to four lateral hairs per side, along with one or two stipitate glands per side in the lower half.

The calyx is 2.5 to 3.3 millimeters long with linear lanceolate lobes measuring 1.8 to 2 millimeters in length. The corolla is bilabiate and 4 to 5 millimeters long. The corolla tube is pale lilac, 2 to 2.5 millimeters long and 0.6 to 0.7 millimeters in diameter. The upper lip consists of two lanceolate lobes 2.5 to 2.7 millimeters long and 1.0 to 1.2 millimeters wide; these are bluish lilac with acute apices and lack glands. The lower lip is trilobed, 4.5 to 5.5 millimeters long, yellowish at the base, with widely ovate and apiculate lobes measuring 1.8 to 2.3 millimeters by 1.8 to 2.2 millimeters. The lower lip lobes are edged in bluish lilac and irregularly white in the central portion. Dense papillae cover the lower lip up to the lobe bases; these papillae measure 0.02 to 0.2 millimeters in length.

Staminal filaments are free and 3 to 3.5 millimeters long. The anthers are violet and connate into a tube 1.0 to 1.1 millimeters long that completely encloses the stigma. The two lower anthers are smaller, lack basal papillae, and bear an apical tuft of hairs. The three upper anthers are curved and hairy on the dorsal surface. The ovary is fused with the calyx tube. The style is whitish, 3.0 to 3.5 millimeters long, with a pale lilac bifid papillate stigma that bears a ring of hairs just beneath its base. The capsule is papillose and 1.8 to 2 millimeters long. Seeds are ellipsoid, brownish, shining, and measure 0.36 to 0.40 millimeters in length by 0.18 to 0.20 millimeters in width.

The species belongs to the genus Solenopsis within the subfamily Lobelioideae of Campanulaceae. Morphologically it shows affinities with other eastern Mediterranean annual species including S. minuta (particularly its annual forms), S. antiphonitis from Cyprus, and S. gutermannii from Kefalonia. It is distinguished from these taxa by its smaller overall dimensions including a calyx 1.1 to 2 millimeters long, corolla 4 to 5 millimeters long, staminal filaments 2 to 2.5 millimeters long, and seeds 0.32 to 0.36 millimeters long.

The species most closely resembles S. antiphonitis in its small flower size but differs in having leaves without marginal glands, a shorter calyx and corolla, lilac corolla lobes with a distinct margin on the lower lip, papillae restricted to the base of the lower lip, and an anther tube lacking basal papillae.

== Etymology ==
The specific epithet sphaciotica refers to the species' type locality: Hora Sfakion (Sfakia).

== Habitat and ecology ==
Solenopsis sphaciotica is endemic to Crete, where it is known from a single locality near Hora Sfakion on the southwestern coast. It grows on temporarily dripping limestone rock walls that are covered by a thin layer of clay rich red soil. The species occurs at approximately 50-60 meters elevation.

The plant flowers in spring alongside other small microphytes including Campanula erinus, Centaurium tenuiflorum, and Sedum rubens, occurring on a sparse moss carpet dominated by Gymnostomum calcareum var. calcareum. It flowers and fruits from April until early June.

== Conservation status ==
The species is known from a single population covering less than 10 square meters, with fewer than 100 individuals recorded. Although the population occurs within a protected area, its extremely restricted distribution makes it vulnerable to stochastic natural events or human disturbance. The authors of the species recommended a conservation assessment of Critically Endangered (CR) under IUCN criteria B2a and D.
