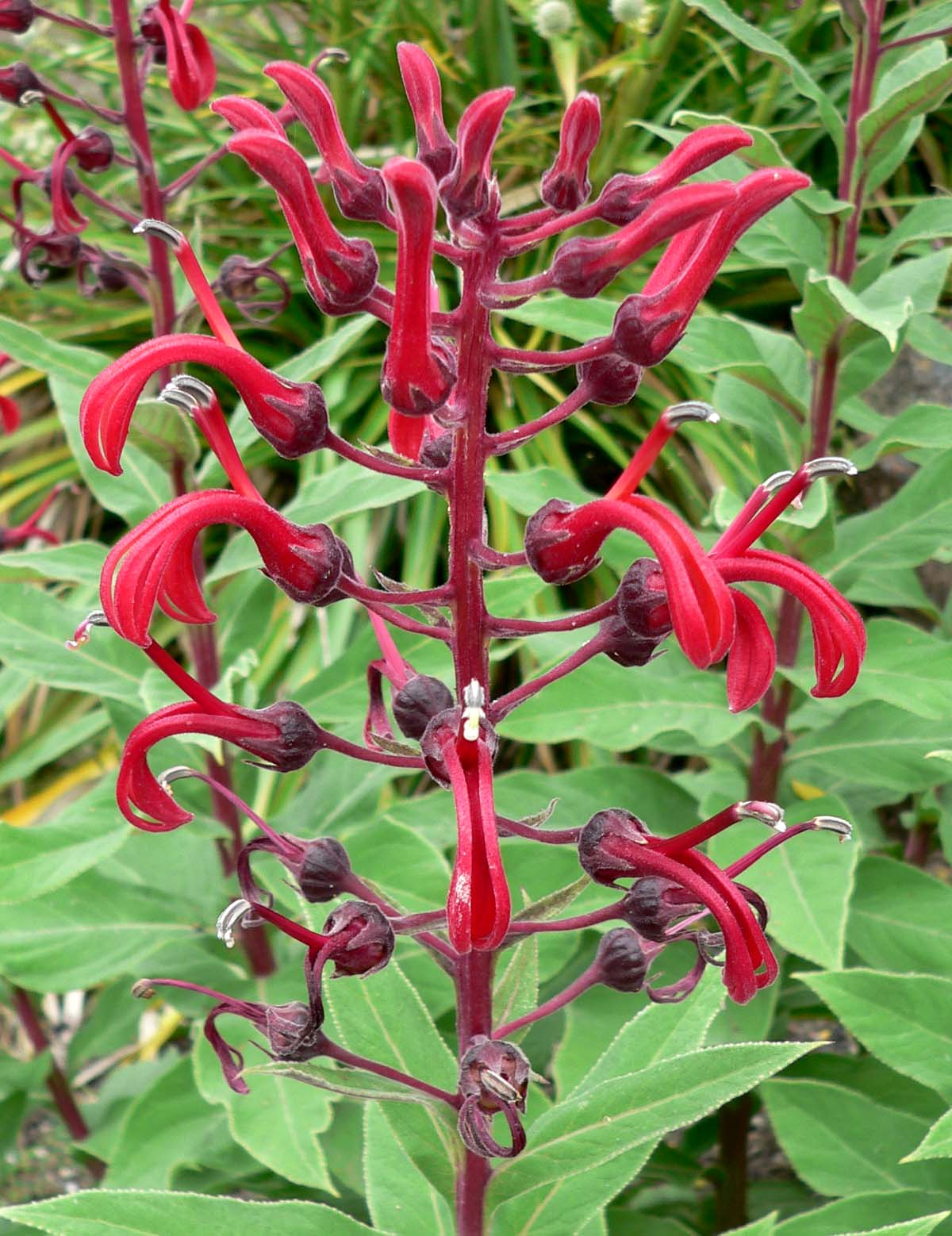

Scientific classification
- Kingdom: Plantae
- Clade: Tracheophytes
- Clade: Angiosperms
- Clade: Eudicots
- Clade: Asterids
- Order: Asterales
- Family: Campanulaceae
- Genus: Lobelia
- Species: L. tupa

Binomial name
- Lobelia tupa L.

= Lobelia tupa =

Species of plant

Lobelia tupa is a species of Lobelia native to central Chile from Valparaíso south to Los Lagos regions.

Lobelia tupa is an evergreen perennial plant which grows up to 4 m tall and thrives in dry soils. The foliage is grey-green, with felty elliptical leaves 10–15 cm long. The flowers are red, tubular and 2-lipped and are produced in a sympodium pattern.

The plant has numerous ethnobotanical uses due to its pharmaceutically active alkaloids. The latex is used as an abortifacient, and the large, felty leaves are smoked as a narcotic with possible hallucinogenic effects - whence one of its common names, Tabaco del Diablo (Devil's tobacco). Ironically, this plant has been used to treat nicotine addiction because it contains the nicotine-related alkaloid Lobeline (a mixed agonist–antagonist at nicotinic acetylcholine receptors). The Mapuche of Southern Chile consider it a sacred plant. Tupa leaves have also been found to contain chemicals that act as a respiratory stimulant.
