= Solenopsis =

Solenopsis is a scientific name for two genera:

- Solenopsis (ant), a genus of ants comprising the fire ants and thief ants
- Solenopsis (plant), a genus of flowering plants in the family Campanulaceae, commonly treated as a synonym of Laurentia or Isotoma
