= Dielsantha =

Conservation status
- Near Threatened (IUCN 3.1)

Scientific classification
- Kingdom: Plantae
- Clade: Tracheophytes
- Clade: Angiosperms
- Clade: Eudicots
- Clade: Asterids
- Order: Asterales
- Family: Campanulaceae
- Subfamily: Lobelioideae
- Genus: Dielsantha; E.Wimm
- Species: D. galeopsoides

Binomial name
- Dielsantha galeopsoides (Engl. & Diels) E.Wimm

Synonyms
- Lobelia galeopsoides Engl. & Diels; Lobelia sylvicola Lejoly & Lisowski

Genus of flowering plants

Dielsantha is a genus of plants in the family Campanulaceae. It has only one known species, Dielsantha galeopsoides, native to tropical West Africa (Nigeria, Cameroon, Congo-Brazzaville, Equatorial Guinea, Gabon, the islands in the Gulf of Guinea.
