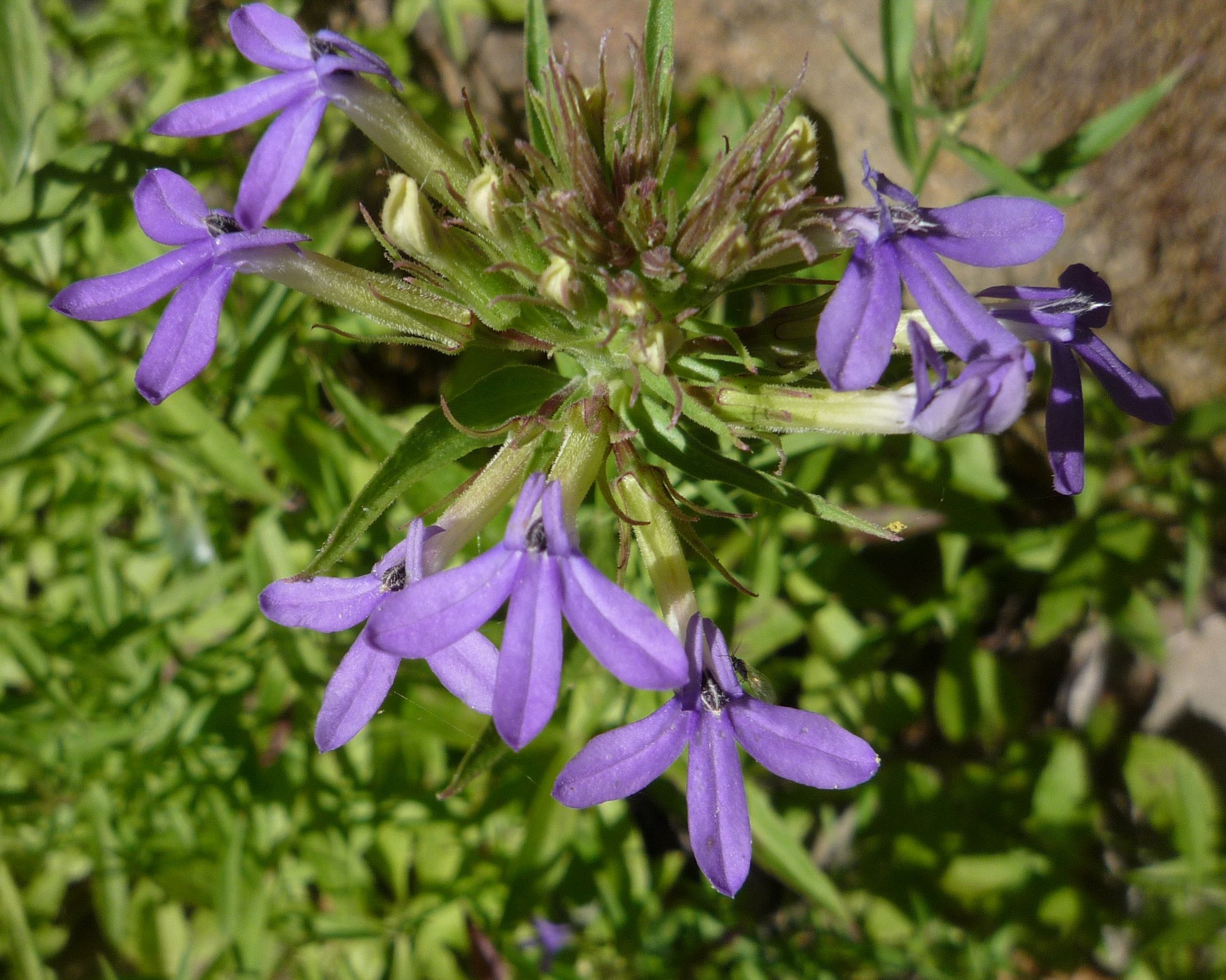
- Palmerella debilis var. serrata Blue Canyon Trail; Santa Ynez Mountains; Santa Barbara County

Scientific classification
- Kingdom: Plantae
- Clade: Tracheophytes
- Clade: Angiosperms
- Clade: Eudicots
- Clade: Asterids
- Order: Asterales
- Family: Campanulaceae
- Subfamily: Lobelioideae
- Genus: Palmerella; A.Gray
- Species: P. debilis

Binomial name
- Palmerella debilis A.Gray

Synonyms
- Lobelia dunnii Greene; Laurentia debilis (A.Gray) McVaugh; Palmerella debilis var. serrata A.Gray in S.Watson & al.; Lobelia rothrockii Greene; Laurentia debilis var. serrata (A.Gray) McVaugh; Lobelia dunnii var. serrata (A.Gray) McVaugh

= Palmerella =

Genus of flowering plants

Palmerella is a genus of plants in the family Campanulaceae. It has only one known species, Palmerella debilis, long known by the synonym Lobelia dunnii. It is native to 8 counties in southern California (San Diego, Orange, Riverside, San Bernardino, Los Angeles, Ventura, Santa Barbara and Monterey) plus the northern part of Baja California.

The oldest name for the plant is Palmerella debilis, coined by Asa Gray in 1876. Greene in 1889 wanted to move the species to the genus Lobelia, but could not use the name Lobelia debilis, because that name had already been used for a different plant by Linnaeus f. in 1782. Hence Greene created the replacement name Lobelia dunnii. More recent publications favor reverting to Gray's older name.

Two subspecies are recognized:

- Palmerella debilis subsp. debilis - Baja California
- Palmerella debilis subsp. serrata (A.Gray) Lammers - California and Baja California
