= Diastatea =

Scientific classification
- Kingdom: Plantae
- Clade: Tracheophytes
- Clade: Angiosperms
- Clade: Eudicots
- Clade: Asterids
- Order: Asterales
- Family: Campanulaceae
- Subfamily: Lobelioideae
- Genus: Diastatea; Scheidw.

Type species
- Diastatea virgata Scheidw.

Genus of flowering plants

Diastatea is a genus of plants native to Latin America, mostly in Mexico and Central America but with one species extending southward along the Andes to Argentina.

- Diastatea costaricensis McVaugh - Guatemala, Honduras, Nicaragua, Costa Rica
- Diastatea expansa McVaugh - central Mexico
- Diastatea ghiesbreghtii (Kuntze) E.Wimm - southwestern Mexico
- Diastatea micrantha (Kunth) McVaugh - widespread from central Mexico to the Jujuy region of northern Argentina
- Diastatea tenera (A.Gray) McVaugh - southern Mexico and Guatemala
- Diastatea virgata Scheidw. - southern Mexico
