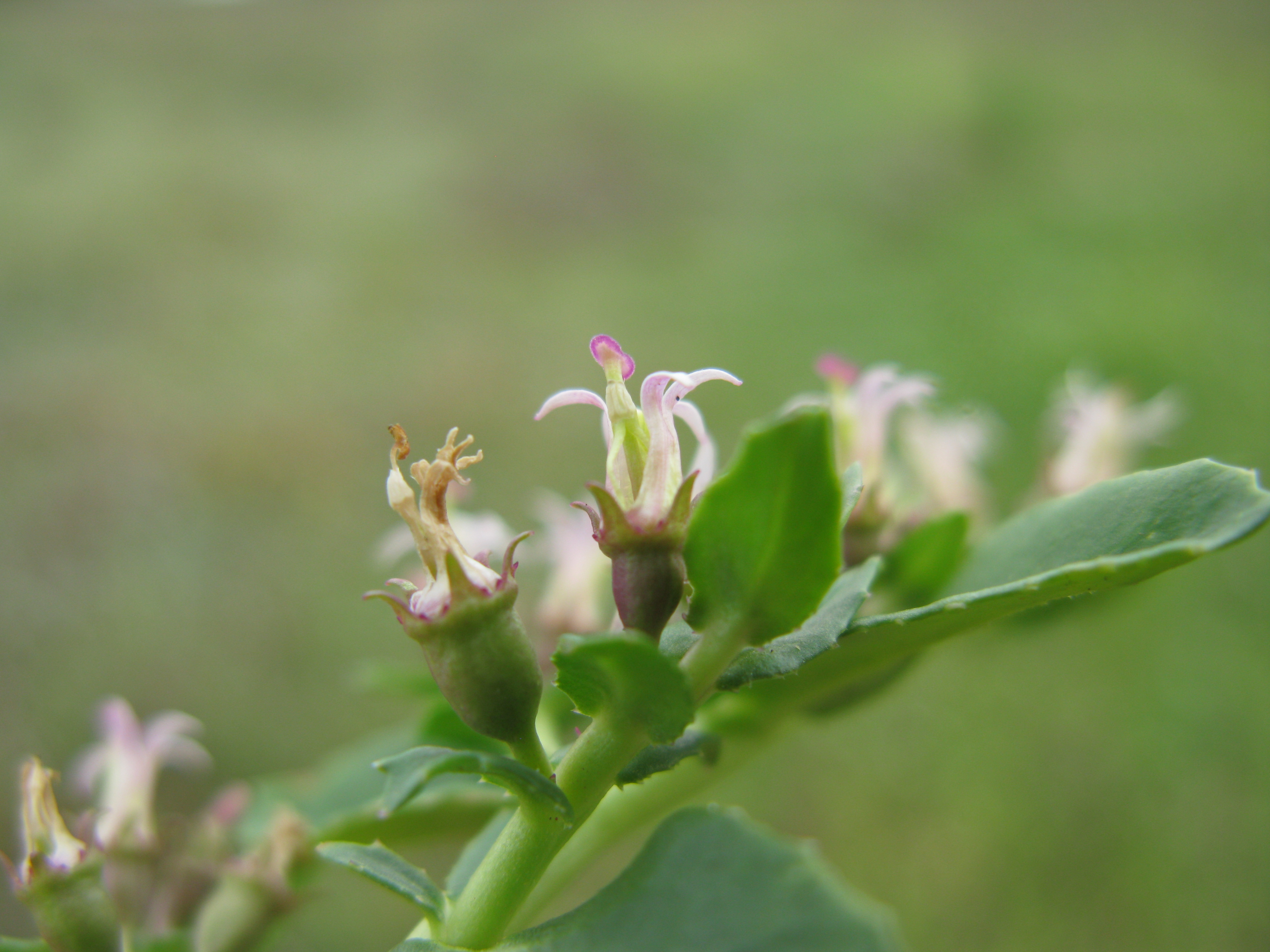

Scientific classification
- Kingdom: Plantae
- Clade: Tracheophytes
- Clade: Angiosperms
- Clade: Eudicots
- Clade: Asterids
- Order: Asterales
- Family: Campanulaceae
- Genus: Lobelia
- Species: L. concolor

Binomial name
- Lobelia concolor R.Br.

Synonyms
- Isolobus concolor (R.Br.) A.DC.; Isolobus cunninghamii A.DC.; Lobelia australiensis Lammers; Pratia concolor (R.Br.) Druce; Pratia concolor var. longipes (Hook.f.) E.Wimm.; Pratia cunninghamii (A.DC.) Hook.f.; Pratia cunninghamii var. longipes Hook.f.; Pratia erecta Gaudich.; Pratia prostrata E.Wimm.

= Lobelia concolor =

Species of plant

Lobelia concolor, synonym Pratia concolor, commonly known as poison pratia, is a small herbaceous scrambling herb native to Australia.
