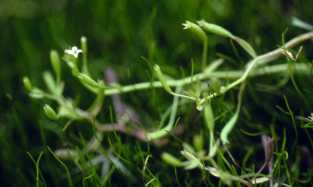

Scientific classification
- Kingdom: Plantae
- Clade: Tracheophytes
- Clade: Angiosperms
- Clade: Eudicots
- Clade: Asterids
- Order: Asterales
- Family: Campanulaceae
- Subfamily: Lobelioideae
- Genus: Legenere
- Species: L. limosa

Binomial name
- Legenere limosa (Greene) McVaugh

= Legenere =

Genus of flowering plants in the bellflower family Campanulaceae

Legenere is a genus in the bellflower family, with only one species, Legenere limosa, an annual wildflower endemic to limited portions of Northern California. The species common name is false Venus's looking glass or Greene's legenere.

== Description ==
Stems are reclining and of length ten to thirty centimeters, but the lateral slender branches are rigid.

== Distribution ==
Blooming in May and June, it occurs below elevations of 610 meters in vernal pools and certain other moist habitats. Principal colonies are in Solano County, Sacramento County, Lake County, Napa County, Sonoma County, Tehama County and Yuba County.

According to the California Native Plant Society L. limosa is classified on List 1B: Rare, threatened, or endangered; and 0.1: Seriously endangered. Main threats to the species are grazing, invasive species, and development.

== Etymology ==
- The genus name Legenere is an anagram of "E. L. Greene". It refers to Edward Lee Greene who first described this plant in 1890.
- The species name limosa derives from the Latin word limosa meaning muddy, and refers to the moist habitats of the plant.

== See also ==
- Wetland
