= Thomas Conrad Porter =

American botanist and theologian (1822-1901)

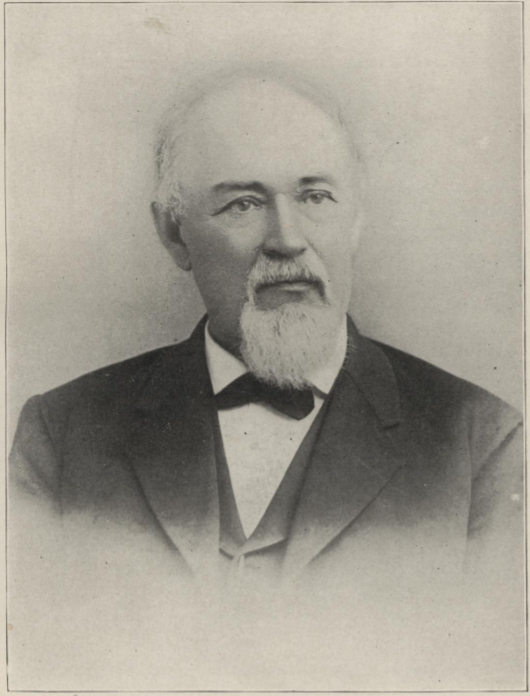
- Thomas Conrad Porter, c. 1900
- Born: January 22, 1822; Alexandria, Pennsylvania
- Died: April 27, 1901 (aged 79); Easton, Pennsylvania
- Education: Lafayette College
- Scientific career
- Fields: Botany
- Workplaces: Franklin & Marshall College; Lafayette College
- Author abbrev. (botany): Porter

Thomas Conrad Porter (1822–1901) was an American botanist and theologian known as an expert on the flora of Pennsylvania.

== Biography ==
Porter was born in Alexandria, Pennsylvania on January 22, 1822. He attended Harrisburg Academy before enrolling in Lafayette College at the age of 14. He graduated in 1840, and returned home to Alexandria and began to collect plants near Tussey Mountain. He went on to attend Princeton Theological Seminary, graduating in 1844. He moved down to Monticello, Georgia for a year as part of a Presbyterian mission. Here he collected at places such as Stone Mountain and Toccoa Falls, and began collaborating with Asa Gray. He discovered Gymnolomia porteri during his time at Stone Mountain.

In 1849, Porter was brought on as a professor of natural sciences at Marshall College. He stayed at the institution until 1866. He then moved to Lafayette College as a professor of botany and zoology, staying until his retirement in 1897. Between 1869 and 1875, Porter worked under Ferdinand Vandeveer Hayden as part of the United States Geological and Geographical Survey of the Territories in the Rocky Mountains.

In 1864, he was elected as a member to the American Philosophical Society.

He was personally interested in Germanic literature and scholarly arts, and published several critiques in the field. He died in 1901.

== Legacy ==
Poter's herbarium was preserved as part of the Academy of Natural Sciences of Philadelphia. A small number of his collections are held in Australasian herbaria, including the National Herbarium of Victoria at the Royal Botanic Gardens Victoria, and the Auckland War Memorial Museum Herbarium.

The genera Porterella and Porteranthus were named for him, as well as the species Aster porteri, Calamagrostis porteri, and Muhlenbergia porteri.

== Selected publications ==
- Porter, Thomas Conrad (1860). German Hymnology. Mercersburg Review.
- Porter, Thomas Conrad (1851). Sonnets. Mercersburg Review.
- Porter, Thomas Conrad; Coulter, John Merle (1874). Synopsis of the Flora of Colorado. U.S. Government Printing Office.
- Porter, Thomas Conrad (1893). A List of the Grasses of Pennsylvania. Torrey Botanical Club.
- Porter, Thomas Conrad; Small, John Kunkel (1903). Flora of Pennsylvania. Ginn.
