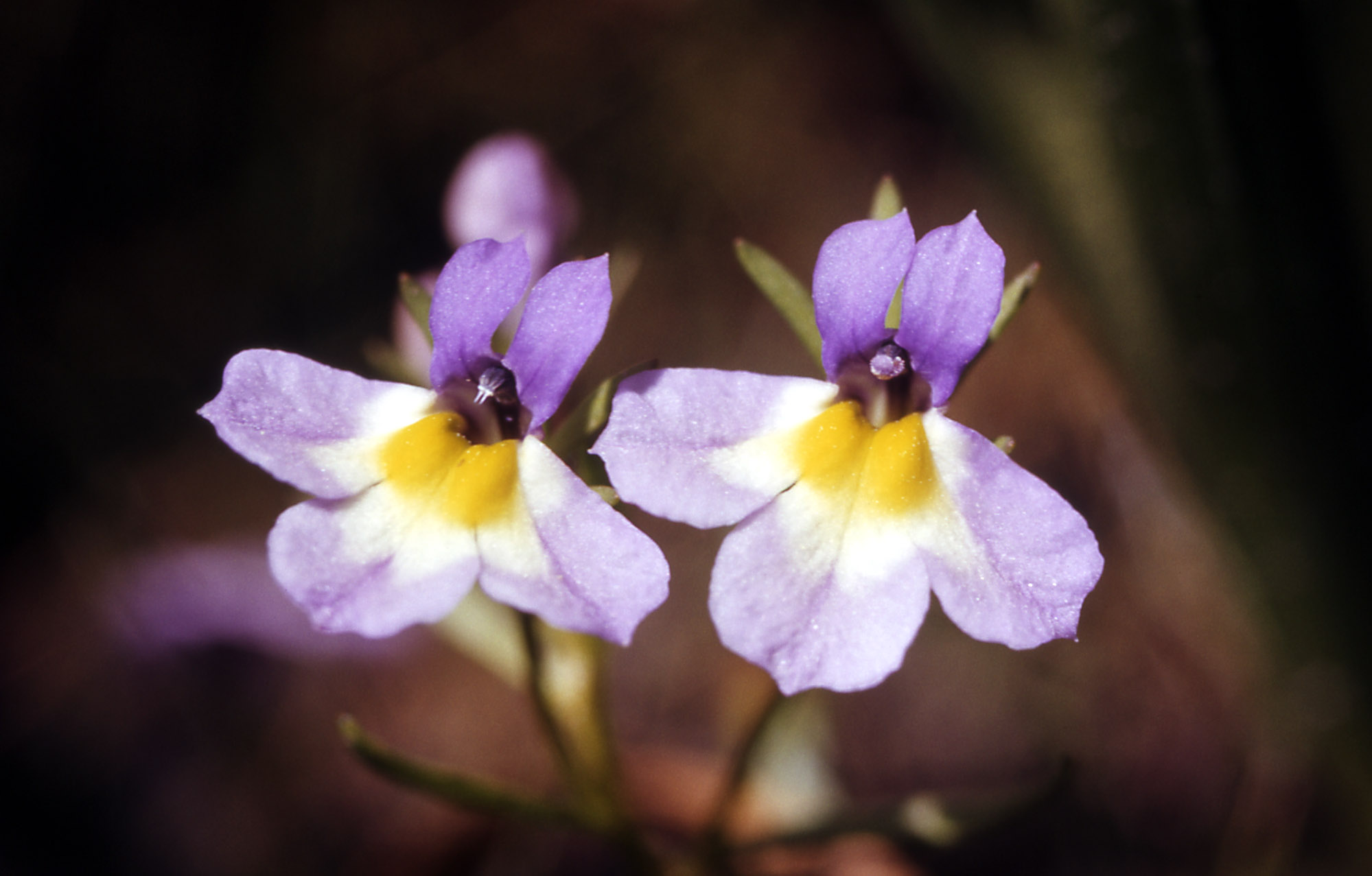

Scientific classification
- Kingdom: Plantae
- Clade: Tracheophytes
- Clade: Angiosperms
- Clade: Eudicots
- Clade: Asterids
- Order: Asterales
- Family: Campanulaceae
- Subfamily: Lobelioideae
- Genus: Porterella; Torr.
- Species: P. carnosula

Binomial name
- Porterella carnosula (Hook. & Arn.) Torr.

= Porterella =

Genus of flowering plants

Porterella is a monotypic genus of flowering plants in the bellflower family containing the single species Porterella carnosula, which is known by the common name fleshy porterella, or simply porterella.

The species is native to the western United States from California to Wyoming, where it grows in moist spots, such as ponds or wet grasslands, sometimes just at the edge of the water or partially submerged. It is an annual herb producing an erect stem to a maximum height around 30 centimeters. The leaves along the stem are oval or triangular, those growing beneath the surface of the water more triangular in shape. They measure up to 1.5 centimeters long by half a centimeter wide. The inflorescence bears showy flowers which are quite similar in appearance to those of some species in sister genus Downingia. Each has a narrow tubular throat opening into a wide corolla with two narrow pointed upper lobes and three wider, rounded lower lobes each with a small tooth. The upper lobes are deep blue, and the lower lobes are a similar shade with an area of white and bright yellow near the throat. The stamens are fused into a single unit tipped with tiny toothlike anthers.

The genus is named for Thomas Conrad Porter.
