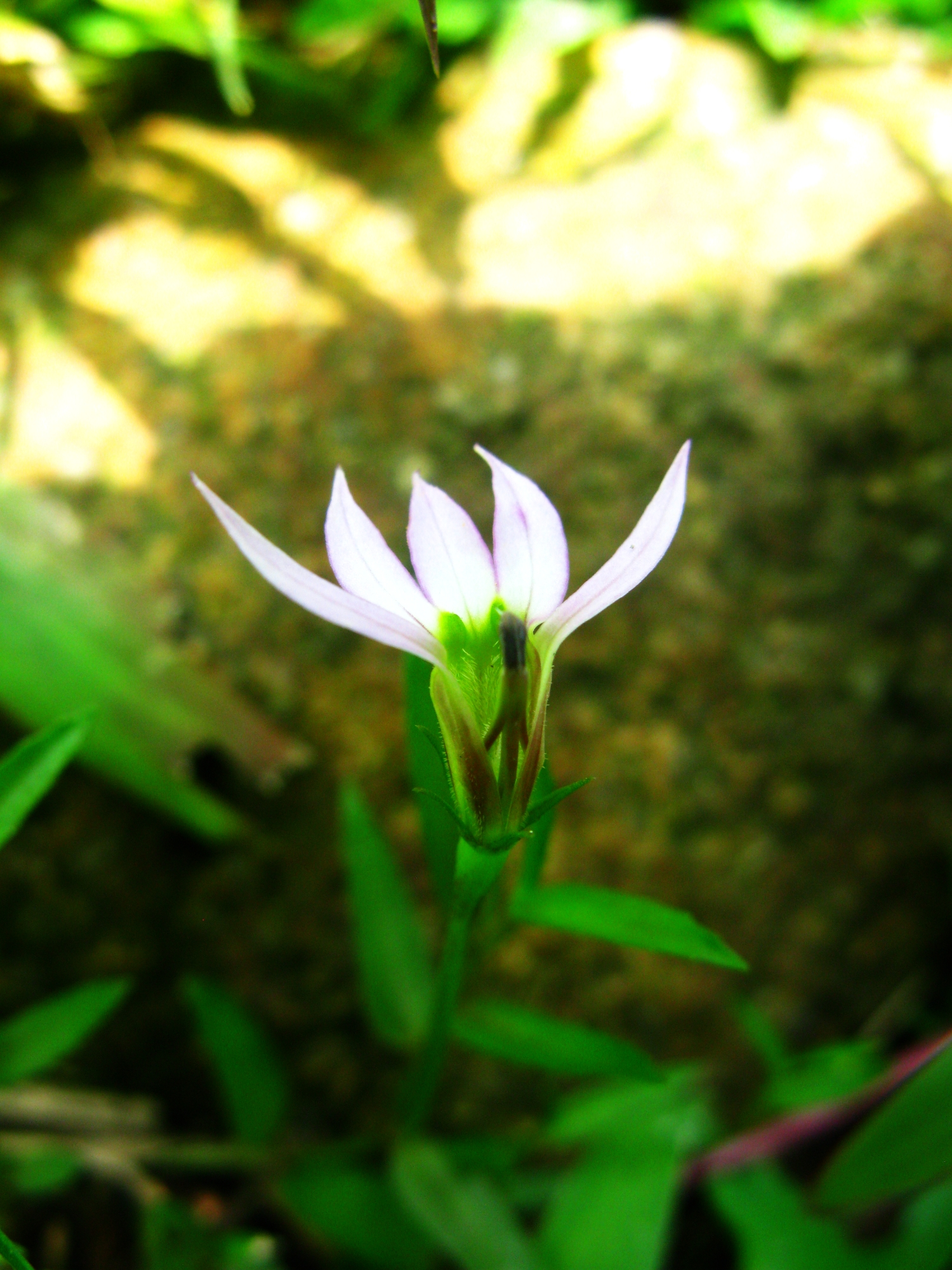
- Flower of Lobelia chinensis

Scientific classification
- Kingdom: Plantae
- Clade: Tracheophytes
- Clade: Angiosperms
- Clade: Eudicots
- Clade: Asterids
- Order: Asterales
- Family: Campanulaceae
- Genus: Lobelia
- Species: L. chinensis

Binomial name
- Lobelia chinensis Lour.

Synonyms
- List: Dortmanna chinensis (Lour.) Kuntze; Rapuntium chinense (Lour.) C.Presl; Dortmanna campanuloides (Thunb.) Kuntze; Dortmanna radicans (Thunb.) Kuntze; Isolobus caespitosus (Blume) Hassk.; Isolobus campanuloides (Thunb.) A.DC.; Isolobus kerii A.DC.; Isolobus radicans (Thunb.) A.DC.; Isolobus roxburghianus A.DC.; Lobelia caespitosa Blume; Lobelia campanuloides Thunb.; Lobelia chinensis var. albiflora (E.Wimm.) E.Wimm.; Lobelia chinensis f. lactiflora (Hisauti) H.Hara; Lobelia chinensis f. plena (Makino) H.Hara; Lobelia chinensis var. tetrapetala Y.N.Lee; Lobelia chinensis f. tetrapetala (Y.N.Lee) M.Kim; Lobelia japonica F.Dietr.; Lobelia kerii (A.DC.) Heynh.; Lobelia radicans Thunb.; Lobelia radicans var. albiflora E.Wimm.; Lobelia radicans f. lactiflora Hisauti; Lobelia radicans f. plena Makino; Lobelia roxburghiana (A.DC.) Heynh.; Pratia radicans G.Don; Pratia thunbergii G.Don; Rapuntium caespitosum (Blume) C.Presl; Rapuntium campanuloides (Thunb.) C.Presl; Rapuntium radicans (Thunb.) C.Presl

= Lobelia chinensis =

Species of flowering plant

Lobelia chinensis is a species of flowering plant in the family Campanulaceae. It is sometimes referred to by the common names Asian lobelia, Chinese lobelia, and Herba Lobellae Chinensis. It is one of the 50 fundamental herbs used in traditional Chinese medicine, where it has the name (Chinese: 半边莲; pinyin: bàn biān lián).

== Description ==
Lobelia chinensis is a small perennial herb that grows in tangled clumps from 15 centimetres (5.9 in) to 35 centimetres (14 in) long. It has a long, thin, branching stem that is olive green and green-brown crumpled narrow leaves. It has little to no odor and a sweet and pungent taste. When harvesting herbs for medical use, the ones with the greenest stems and yellower roots are preferred.

== Distribution ==
It is native to Bangladesh, Cambodia, China, India, Japan, Korea, Laos, Malaysia, Nepal, Taiwan, Thailand, and Vietnam.

== Herbal medicine ==
Lobelia chinensis is considered one of the 50 fundamental herbs in Chinese herbology. Historically, L. chinensis has been used in herbal medicine to help stop smoking, however the Food and Drug Administration has banned the use of herbs containing lobeline due to its lack of acceptable clinical efficacy data.

== Chemical constituents ==
Lobelia chinensis contains 6,7-dimethoxycoumarin, fraxinol, 5-hydroxy-7-methoxycoumarin, tomentin, 3'-hydroxygenkwanin, apigenin, quercetin, luteolin, linarin, luteolin 3',4'-dimethylether-7-O-beta-D-glucoside, isoferulic acid, and ethyl rosmarinate.

== Toxicity and adverse effects ==
Lobelia chinensis is considered mildly toxic due to its adverse effects, including vomiting, heartburn, anxiety, vibrating, eclampsia, increased heart-rate, and severe stomach aches.
