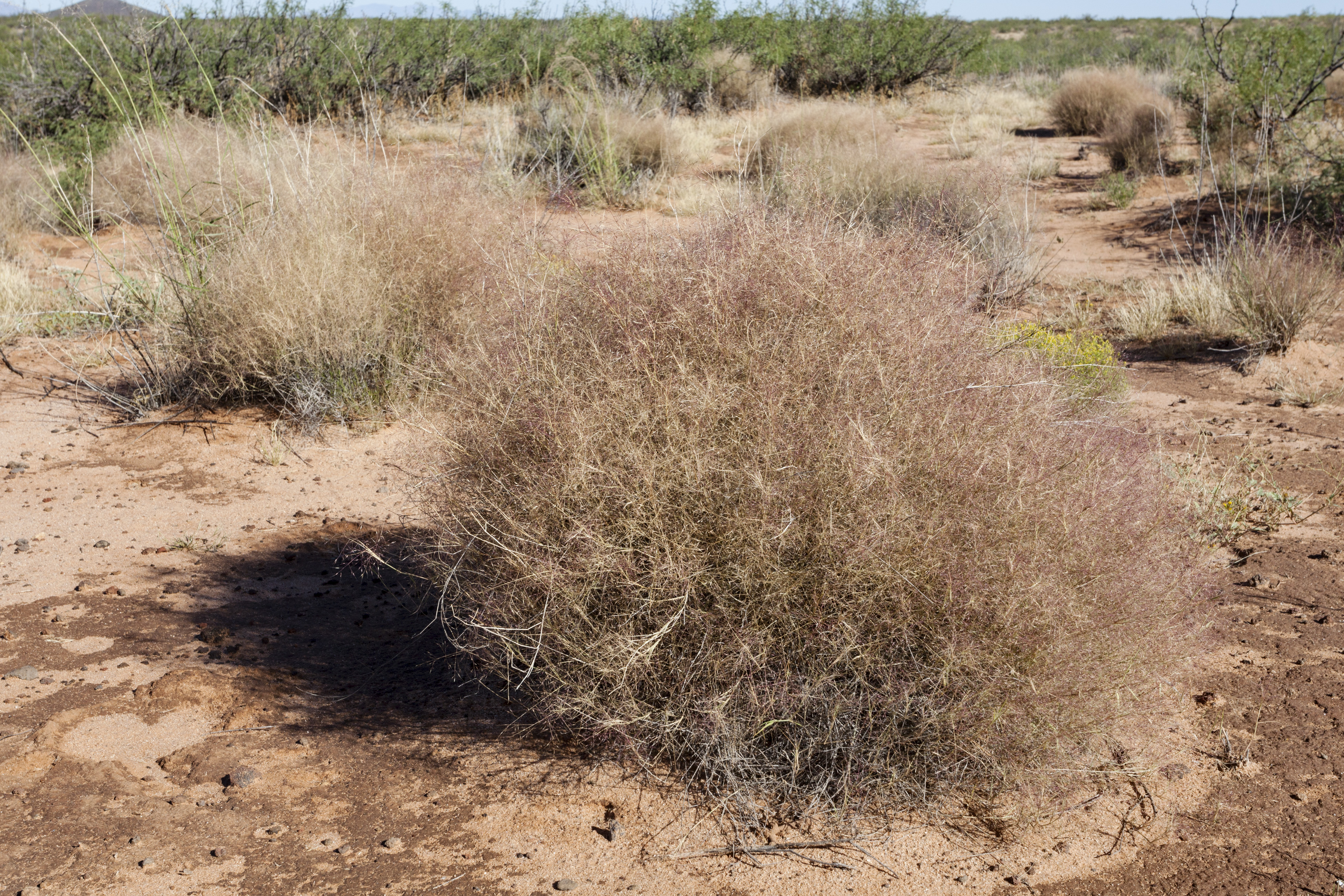

Conservation status
- Secure (NatureServe)

Scientific classification
- Kingdom: Plantae
- Clade: Tracheophytes
- Clade: Angiosperms
- Clade: Monocots
- Clade: Commelinids
- Order: Poales
- Family: Poaceae
- Subfamily: Chloridoideae
- Genus: Muhlenbergia
- Species: M. porteri

Binomial name
- Muhlenbergia porteri Scribn. ex Beal

= Muhlenbergia porteri =

Species of flowering plant

Muhlenbergia porteri is a North American species of grass known by the common names bush muhly and Porter's muhly.

== Description ==
Muhlenbergia porteri is a perennial bunchgrass producing wiry, knotted stems up to about 80 centimeters tall. The inflorescence is an open array of spreading, thread-thin branches bearing small, awned spikelets. The bloom period is May and June.

The species was named for Thomas Conrad Porter.

== Distribution ==
The bunchgrass is native to North America, where it can be found throughout the south-western United States, from the southern Great Basin and Four Corners region to the northern Mexican Plateau and Baja California Peninsula. Specifically, Muhlenbergii porteri naturally occurs in ecoregions including the California deserts, the Great Plains from far southern Colorado into western Texas, and the Chihuahuan Desert.

It grows at elevations of 610–1,900 metres (2,000–6,230 ft), in rocky and shrubby habitats including shadscale scrub, creosote bush scrub, desert grassland, and Joshua Tree woodlands.
