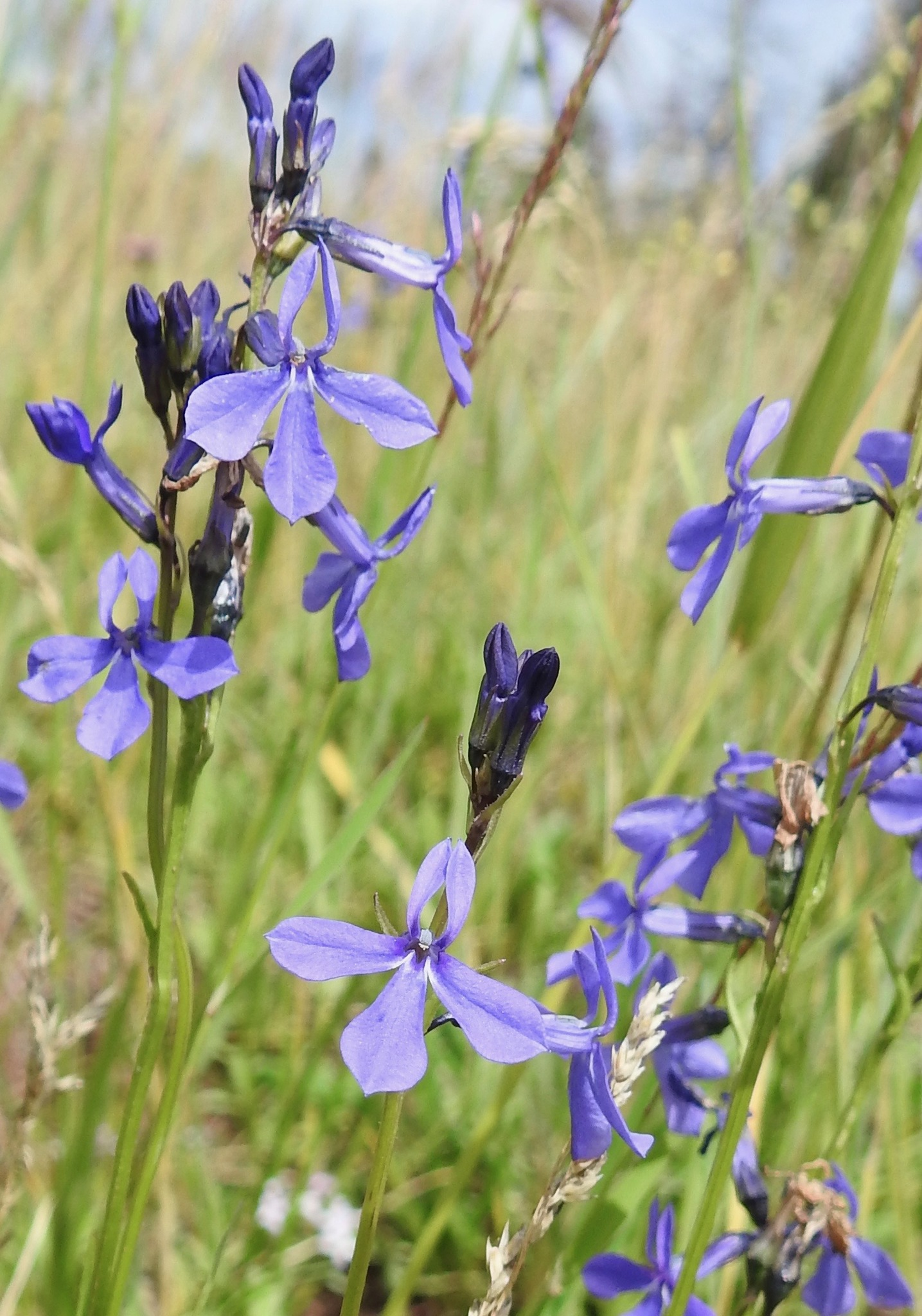

Scientific classification
- Kingdom: Plantae
- Clade: Tracheophytes
- Clade: Angiosperms
- Clade: Eudicots
- Clade: Asterids
- Order: Asterales
- Family: Campanulaceae
- Genus: Lobelia
- Species: L. anatina

Binomial name
- Lobelia anatina E.Wimm.

= Lobelia anatina =

Species of flowering plant

Lobelia anatina, commonly known as Apache lobelia or south western lobelia, is a small herbaceous plant in the family Campanulaceae native to North America.

The herb is found only in the south west of North America.
