= Ruthiella =

Scientific classification
- Kingdom: Plantae
- Clade: Tracheophytes
- Clade: Angiosperms
- Clade: Eudicots
- Clade: Asterids
- Order: Asterales
- Family: Campanulaceae
- Subfamily: Lobelioideae
- Genus: Ruthiella; Steenis

Type species
- Phyllocharis schlechteri Diels.

Synonyms
- Phyllocharis Diels 1919, illegitimate homonym, not Fée 1824

Genus of flowering plants

Ruthiella is a genus of flowering plants in the bellflower family Campanulaceae. It contains four species, all endemic to New Guinea.

== Taxonomy ==
Ruthiella was established by the Dutch botanist Cornelis Gijsbert Gerrit Jan van Steenis in 1965 as a replacement name (nomen novum) for the Papuan genus Phyllocharis, published by Ludwig Diels in 1917, which proved to be an illegitimate later homonym of the much earlier lichen genus Phyllocharis Fée (1824). Under the rules of botanical nomenclature, the earlier lichen name has priority, so the campanulaceous Phyllocharis could not be maintained and required a new generic name. Fée's lichen genus had in practice fallen out of use – it was recognised only by its author and was reduced to synonymy by Montagne about fifteen years later, a treatment followed by subsequent lichenologists – but its priority still blocked the plant name.

To resolve this conflict, a formal proposal was published in 1961 in the journal Taxon to conserve Diels's Phyllocharis against the earlier lichen homonym. The proposal, which was supported by three botanists including an experienced lichenologist, argued that conservation would be useful for stabilising the name in Campanulaceae, both for floristic work in New Guinea and for general handbooks on the family. The Subcommittee for Phanerogams, however, considered the proposal redundant and rejected it in 1963, making it necessary to coin a new generic name and transfer the existing species.

Van Steenis therefore published Ruthiella in 1965 as a new generic name for Phyllocharis Diels. In the same paper he made four new combinations, and he selected Ruthiella schlechteri as the lectotype species for the genus. The generic name honours Ruth van Crevel, the long-serving illustrator of the series Flora Malesiana, whose illustrations – including those of the Campanulaceae and the original Phyllocharis – were regarded by van Steenis as an important contribution to the project.

== Species ==
- Ruthiella oblongifolia (Diels) Steenis
- Ruthiella saxicola (P.Royen) Steenis
- Ruthiella schlechteri (Diels) Steenis
- Ruthiella subcordata (Merr. & L.M.Perry) Steenis
