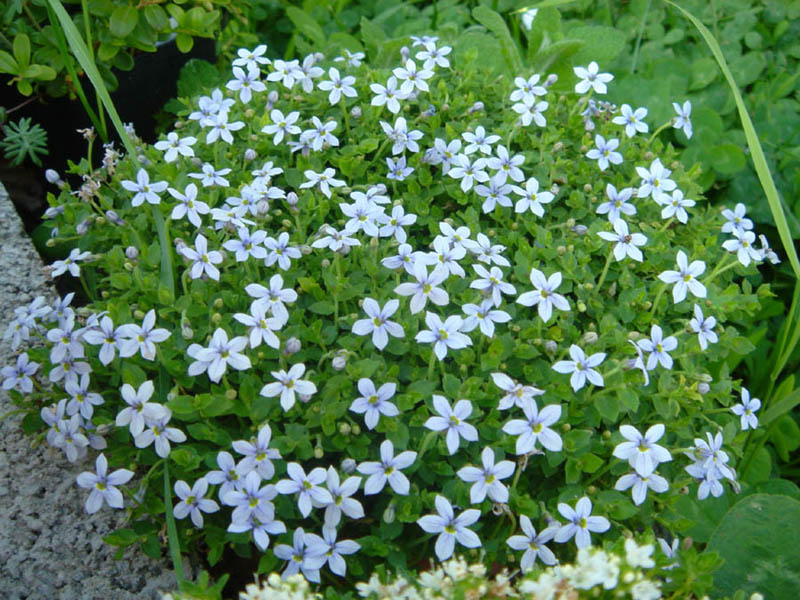

Scientific classification
- Kingdom: Plantae
- Clade: Tracheophytes
- Clade: Angiosperms
- Clade: Eudicots
- Clade: Asterids
- Order: Asterales
- Family: Campanulaceae
- Genus: Lobelia
- Species: L. pedunculata

Binomial name
- Lobelia pedunculata R.Br.

Synonyms
- Pratia pedunculata (R.Br.) Benth

= Lobelia pedunculata =

Species of plant

Lobelia pedunculata, commonly known as matted pratia, trailing pratia or blue star creeper, is a perennial herb from Australia.

It has sky-blue starry flowers, and can spread by underground stolon. In a garden setting some gardeners have found its ability to spread to be a nuisance.

== Varieties ==
One variety, Lobelia pedunculata var. Almanda Blue, was found in Scott Creek Conservation Park in 2013 by John Wamsley. It has a dense weeping habit and small, female-only flowers. Wamsley registered it as intellectual property under Australia's plant breeders' rights and as a US patent. Clones of this plant are sold as garden plants, and royalties go toward preserving biodiversity in the park it was found in.
