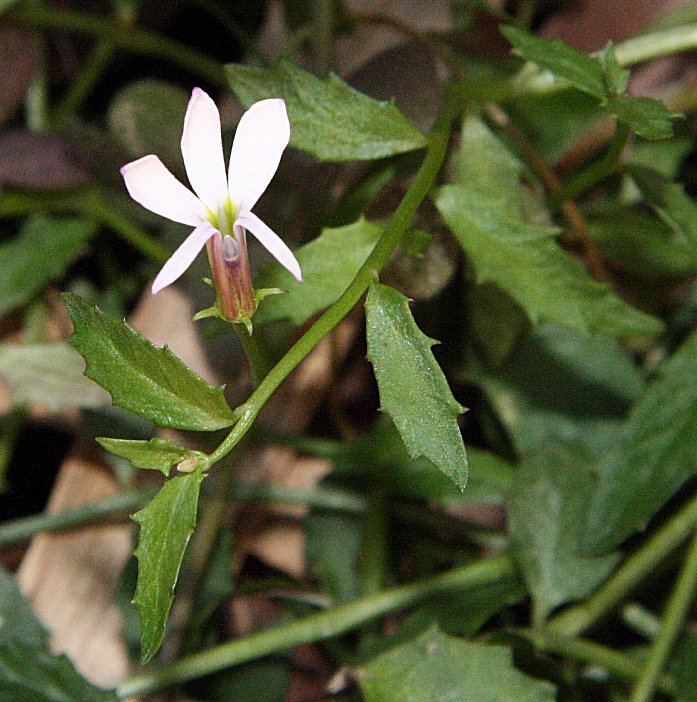
- Cultivated specimen of Lobelia purpurascens

Scientific classification
- Kingdom: Plantae
- Clade: Tracheophytes
- Clade: Angiosperms
- Clade: Eudicots
- Clade: Asterids
- Order: Asterales
- Family: Campanulaceae
- Genus: Lobelia
- Species: L. purpurascens

Binomial name
- Lobelia purpurascens R.Br.

Synonyms
- Lobelia ilicifolia Sims; Pratia puberula f. arguta E.Wimm.; Pratia purpurascens (R.Br.) E.Wimm.; Rapuntium purpurascens (R.Br.) C.Presl

= Lobelia purpurascens =

White root

Species of flowering plant

Lobelia purpurascens, commonly known as white root or purplish pratia, is a flowering plant in the family Campanulaceae of eastern Australia. It is a small herbaceous, scrambling plant with white to pale pink flowers.

== Description ==
Lobelia purpurascens is a small, smooth herb usually less than 12 cm (4.7 in) high with ascending or more or less prostrate stems, usually 30 cm (12 in) long with white rhizomes. The leaves are arranged alternately, more or less sessile, elliptic to oval shaped, 10–25 mm (0.39–0.98 in) long and 5–10 mm (0.20–0.39 in) wide, margins toothed and the undersurface usually purplish coloured on a petiole up to 2 mm (0.079 in) long. The single flowers are borne in leaf axils on a pedicel 1–7 cm (0.39–2.76 in) long, corolla pale mauve-pink, bluish or white, 8–10 mm (0.31–0.39 in) long, lower petals oblong-rounded, upper petals upright, tapering to a point, curved inward and smaller than upper petals. Flowering occurs from November to May and the fruit 3–10 mm (0.12–0.39 in) long, 3–6 mm (0.12–0.24 in) wide and smooth.

== Taxonomy and naming ==
Lobelia purpurascens was first formally described in 1810 by Robert Brown and the description was published in Prodromus florae Novae Hollandiae et insulae Van-Diemen, exhibens characteres plantarum quas annis 1802-1805. The specific epithet (purpurascens) means "purplish".

== Distribution and habitat ==
White root grows mostly in shady, moist situations in woodland and grasslands in New South Wales, Queensland and Victoria.
