= Lobeline =

Chemical compound

Clinical data
- AHFS/Drugs.com: International Drug Names
- ATCvet code: QV04CV01 (WHO)

Identifiers
- IUPAC name: 2-((2R,6S)-6-((S)-2-Hydroxy-2-phenylethyl)-1-methylpiperidin-2-yl)-1-phenylethanone
- CAS Number: 90-69-7
- PubChem CID: 101616
- DrugBank: DB05137
- ChemSpider: 91814
- UNII: D0P25S3P81
- KEGG: D02364
- ChEBI: CHEBI:48723
- ChEMBL: ChEMBL2103769
- CompTox Dashboard (EPA): DTXSID3023219
- ECHA InfoCard: 100.001.830

Chemical and physical data
- Formula: C_{22}H_{27}NO_{2}
- Molar mass: 337.463 g·mol^{−1}
- 3D model (JSmol): Interactive image
- Melting point: 130 to 131 °C (266 to 268 °F)
- SMILES: O=C(C[C@@H]1N([C@@H](CCC1)C[C@@H](C2=CC=CC=C2)O)C)C3=CC=CC=C3
- InChI: InChI=1S/C22H27NO2/c1-23-19(15-21(24)17-9-4-2-5-10-17)13-8-14-20(23)16-22(25)18-11-6-3-7-12-18/h2-7,9-12,19-21,24H,8,13-16H2,1H3/t19-,20+,21-/m0/s1; Key:MXYUKLILVYORSK-HBMCJLEFSA-N

Lobeline is a piperidine alkaloid found in a variety of plants, particularly those in the genus Lobelia, including Indian tobacco (Lobelia inflata), Devil's tobacco (Lobelia tupa), great lobelia (Lobelia siphilitica), Lobelia chinensis, and Hippobroma longiflora. In its pure form, it is a white amorphous powder which is freely soluble in water.

== Potential uses ==
Lobeline has been sold, in tablet form, for use as a smoking cessation aid, but scientific research has not provided supporting evidence for this use. Lobeline has also been studied for the treatment of other drug addictions such as addiction to amphetamines, cocaine, or alcohol; however, there is limited clinical evidence of any efficacy.

== Toxicity ==
Ingestion of lobeline may cause nausea, vomiting, diarrhea, coughing, dizziness, visual disturbances, hearing disturbances, mental confusion, weakness, slowed heart rate, increased blood pressure, increased breathing rate, tremors, and seizures. Lobeline has a narrow therapeutic index: the potentially beneficial dose of lobeline is very close to the toxic dose.

== Pharmacology ==
Lobeline has multiple mechanisms of action, acting as a VMAT2 ligand, which stimulates dopamine release to a moderate extent when administered alone, but reduces the dopamine release caused by methamphetamine. It also inhibits the reuptake of dopamine and serotonin, and acts as a mixed agonist–antagonist at nicotinic acetylcholine receptors to which it binds at the subunit interfaces of the extracellular domain. It is also an antagonist at μ-opioid receptors. It seems to be a P-glycoprotein inhibitor, according to at least one study. It has been hypothesized that P-glycoprotein inhibition reduces chemotherapeutic resistance in cancer, presumably affecting any substrates of P-gp.

Analogous compounds, such as lobelane (a minor alkaloid found in the same plants) and its synthetic derivatives have similar biological effects with somewhat different relative affinities to VMAT and other proteins. A related alkaloid sedamine, with only one 2-phenylethyl group on the piperidine ring and found in plants of genus sedum, is known to be an inhibitor of pea seedlings amine oxidase, but its affinity to proteins such as the dopamine transporter has apparently not been tested.

== See also ==
- Lobelanine
- Lobelanidine
