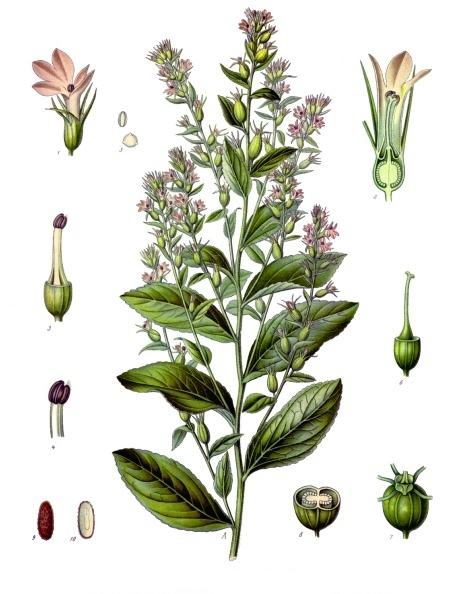
- Lobelia inflata

Conservation status
- Secure (NatureServe)

Scientific classification
- Kingdom: Plantae
- Clade: Embryophytes
- Clade: Tracheophytes
- Clade: Angiosperms
- Clade: Eudicots
- Clade: Asterids
- Order: Asterales
- Family: Campanulaceae
- Genus: Lobelia
- Species: L. inflata

Binomial name
- Lobelia inflata L.

= Lobelia inflata =

Indian tobacco

Species of plant

Lobelia inflata, also known as Indian tobacco or puke weed, is a species of Lobelia native to eastern North America, from southeastern Canada (Nova Scotia to southeast Ontario) south through the eastern United States to Alabama and west to Kansas.

== Description ==
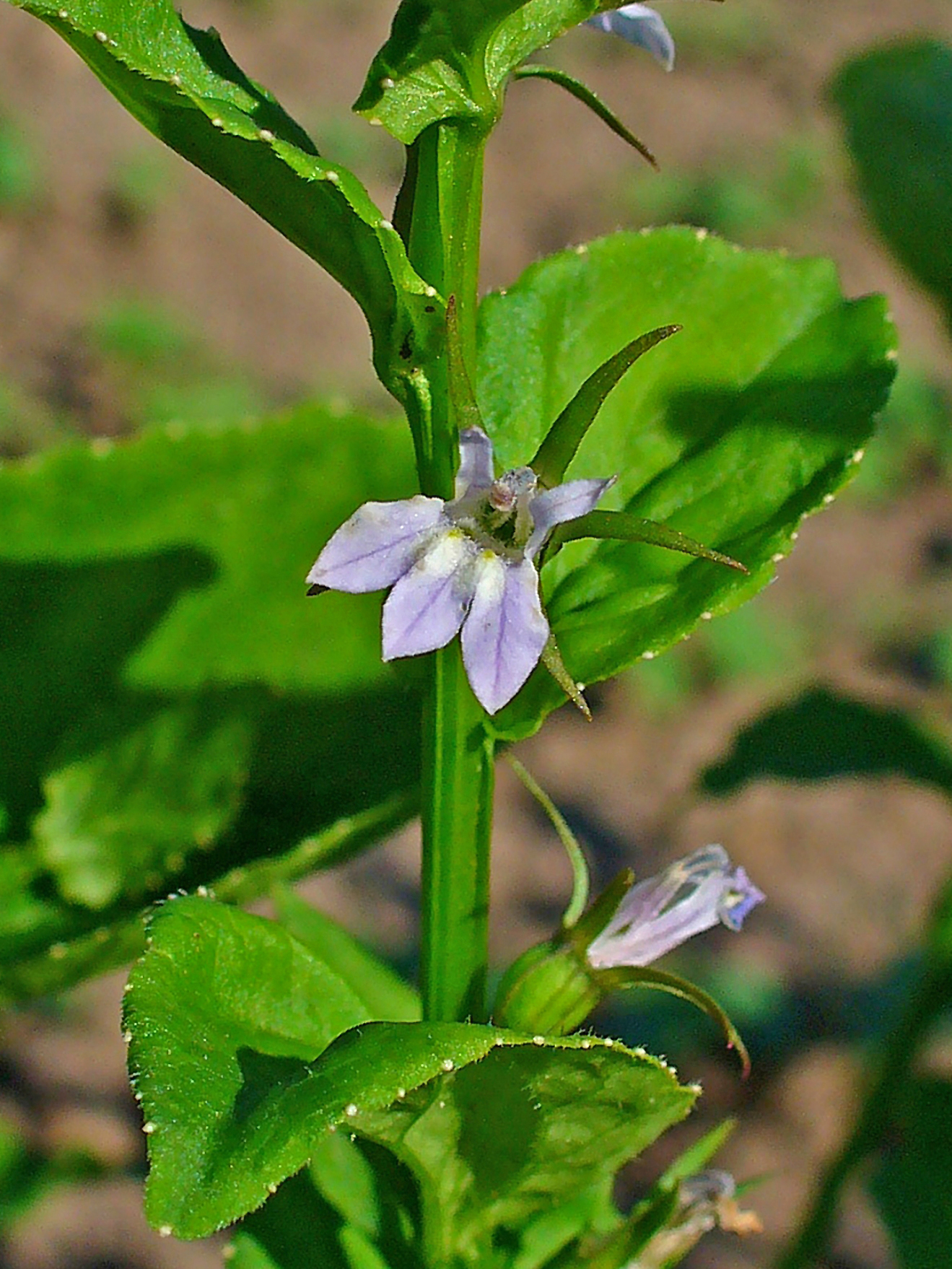
Lobelia inflata. Flower

Lobelia inflata is an annual or biennial herbaceous plant growing to 15–100 cm (5.9–39.4 in) tall, with stems covered in tiny hairs. Its leaves are usually about 8 cm (3.1 in) long, and are ovate and toothed. They are alternately arranged. It has violet colored flowers that are tinted yellow on the inside, and usually appear in mid-summer and continue to bloom into fall. The seedcases are small, brown, dehiscent, and papery.

== Propagation ==
Propagation is usually accomplished by cuttings or seed. Seeds are sown in containers in mid spring or mid fall. The seeds take about 2 weeks to germinate.

== Ecology ==
Lobelia inflata is pollinated by small bees including sweat bees.

== Traditional uses and adverse effects ==
Lobelia inflata has a long use as a medicinal plant as an entheogenic, emetic, and skin or respiratory aid. Native Americans used it for respiratory and muscle disorders, as a purgative, and as a ceremonial medicine. The leaves were chewed and smoked. The plant was used as a traditional medicinal plant by the Cherokee, Iroquois, Penobscot, and other indigenous peoples. The foliage was burned by the Cherokee as a natural insecticide, to smoke out gnats.

Although it may be used medicinally, consuming lobelia causes adverse effects, which may include sweating, nausea, vomiting, diarrhea, tremors, rapid heartbeat, mental confusion, convulsions, hypothermia, coma, or possibly death. The root is toxic and can be fatal if eaten.

== Chemical constituents ==
Lobelia inflata contains multiple alkaloid compounds, including lobeline, norlobelanine, lobelanidine, and radicamine, among other compounds, such as flavonoids, terpenes, alkynes, and coumarins. Lobeline concentration is highest in the seeds.
