= Asthmador =

Asthma treatment drug

Asthmador was a nonprescription treatment for the relief of bronchial asthma made by the R. Schiffmann Company.

It consisted of a mixture of belladonna, stramonium and potassium perchlorate, and was a fine powder intended to be burned and the smoke inhaled. The primary alkaloid present in the mixture was hyoscyamine, and when the powder was ingested rather than burned, it could be used to induce hallucinations. In severe overdose, it could hospitalise the patient or cause death.

Prior to the introduction of rescue inhalers in the mid-1950s this was an over-the-counter remedy for asthma attacks. Asthmador was sold in packets like cigarettes, in tins like pipe tobacco, or as an incense. The paroxysms would abate within a few minutes of inhaling the mixture.
