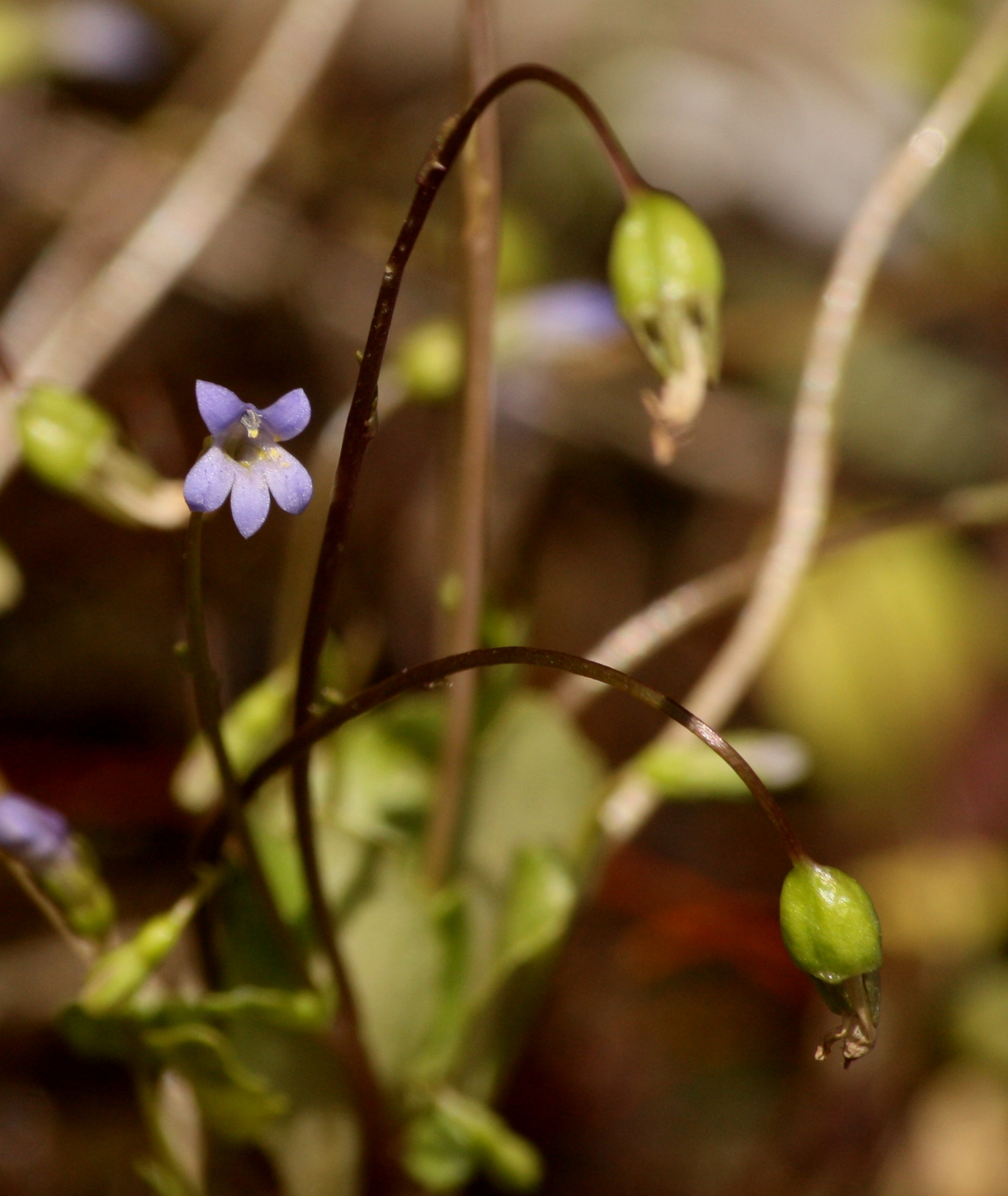
- Solenopsis laurentia

Scientific classification
- Kingdom: Plantae
- Clade: Tracheophytes
- Clade: Angiosperms
- Clade: Eudicots
- Clade: Asterids
- Order: Asterales
- Family: Campanulaceae
- Subfamily: Lobelioideae
- Genus: Solenopsis; C.Presl

= Solenopsis (plant) =

Genus of flowering plants

Solenopsis is a genus of plants in the Campanulaceae. It is native to the Mediterranean region from Portugal and the Canary Islands east to Turkey.

== Species ==
- Solenopsis antiphonitis Hadjik. & Hand - Cyprus
- Solenopsis balearica (E.Wimm.) Aldasoro & al - Balearic Islands
- Solenopsis bicolor (Batt.) Greuter & Burdet - Tunisia, Algeria
- Solenopsis bivonae (Tineo) M.B.Crespo, Serra & Juan - Calabria, Sicily, Sardinia, Cyprus
- Solenopsis corsica (Meikle) M.B.Crespo, Serra & Juan - Sardinia, Corsica
- Solenopsis laurentia (L.) C.Presl - Portugal, Spain, France, Italy, Albania, Greece, Turkey, Lebanon, Syria, Tunisia, Morocco, Algeria, Canary Islands
- Solenopsis minuta (L.) C.Presl - Sicily, Sardinia, Crete
- Solenopsis sphaciotica Cambria, Giusso, Minissale & Brullo - Crete
