= Lobelanine =

Names
- Preferred IUPAC name 2,2′-[(2R,6S)-1-Methylpiperidine-2,6-diyl]bis(1-phenylethan-1-one)

Identifiers
CAS Number	579-21-5
3D model (JSmol)	Interactive image
ChemSpider	391009
KEGG	C10157
PubChem CID	442647
UNII	4XWB84090T
CompTox Dashboard (EPA)	DTXSID10206617
- InChI: InChI=1S/C22H25NO2/c1-23-19(15-21(24)17-9-4-2-5-10-17)13-8-14-20(23)16-22(25)18-11-6-3-7-12-18/h2-7,9-12,19-20H,8,13-16H2,1H3/t19-,20+ Key: IDEMKXUAULKYJV-BGYRXZFFSA-N
- SMILES: CN1[C@H](CCC[C@H]1CC(=O)C2=CC=CC=C2)CC(=O)C3=CC=CC=C3

Properties
Chemical formula	C_{22}H_{25}NO_{2}
Molar mass	335.447 g·mol^{−1}
- Except where otherwise noted, data are given for materials in their standard state (at 25 °C [77 °F], 100 kPa). Infobox references

Lobelanine is a chemical precursor in the biosynthesis of lobeline.
