= Lobelanidine =

Names
- Preferred IUPAC name (1R)-2-{(2R,6S)-6-[(2S)-2-Hydroxy-2-phenylethyl]-1-methylpiperidin-2-yl}-1-phenylethan-1-ol
- Other names 8,10-Diphenyllobelidiol

Identifiers
CAS Number	552-72-7
3D model (JSmol)	Interactive image
ChEBI	CHEBI:6507
ChEMBL	ChEMBL122676
ChemSpider	391008
KEGG	C10156
PubChem CID	442646
UNII	J3ZM7K5LNB
CompTox Dashboard (EPA)	DTXSID10970528
- InChI: InChI=1S/C22H29NO2/c1-23-19(15-21(24)17-9-4-2-5-10-17)13-8-14-20(23)16-22(25)18-11-6-3-7-12-18/h2-7,9-12,19-22,24-25H,8,13-16H2,1H3/t19-,20+,21-,22+ Key: OWGJQNXIWMMDTH-COPRSSIGSA-N
- SMILES: CN1[C@H](CCC[C@H]1C[C@@H](C2=CC=CC=C2)O)C[C@H](C3=CC=CC=C3)O

Properties
Chemical formula	C_{22}H_{29}NO_{2}
Molar mass	339.479 g·mol^{−1}
- Except where otherwise noted, data are given for materials in their standard state (at 25 °C [77 °F], 100 kPa). Infobox references

Lobelanidine is a chemical analog of lobeline.
