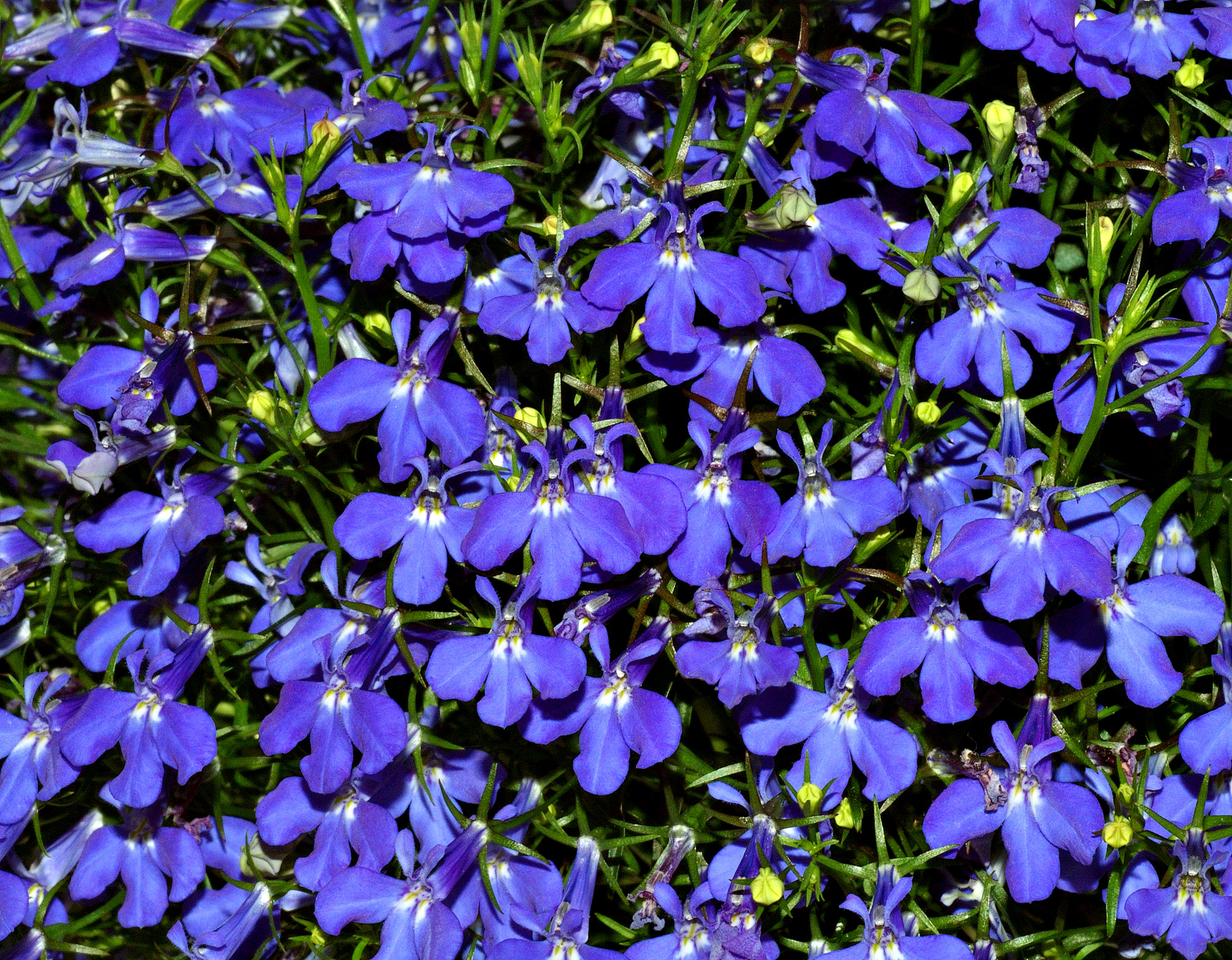
- Lobelia erinus

Scientific classification
- Kingdom: Plantae
- Clade: Embryophytes
- Clade: Tracheophytes
- Clade: Angiosperms
- Clade: Eudicots
- Clade: Asterids
- Order: Asterales
- Family: Campanulaceae
- Subfamily: Lobelioideae
- Genus: Lobelia; L.

Type species
- Lobelia cardinalis L.

Species
- See List of Lobelia species

Synonyms
- List: Calcaratolobelia Wilbur; Cardinalis Fabr.; Chamula Noronha; Colensoa Hook.f.; Dortmanna Hill; Dortmannia Kuntze; Enchysia C.Presl; Euhaynaldia Borbás; Galeatella (E.Wimm.) O.Deg. & I.Deg.; Haynaldia Kanitz, nom. illeg. homonym. post.; Holostigma G.Don; Holostigmateia Rchb., nom. illeg. superfl.; Hypsela C.Presl; Isolobus A.DC.; Laurentia Michx. ex Adans.; Mecoschistum Dulac; Neowimmeria O.Deg. & I.Deg; Piddingtonia A.DC.; Pratia Gaudich.; Rapuntium Mill.; Rhynchopetalum Fresen.; Speirema Hook.f. & Thomson; Tupa G.Don; Tylomium C.Presl

= Lobelia =

Genus of flowering plants

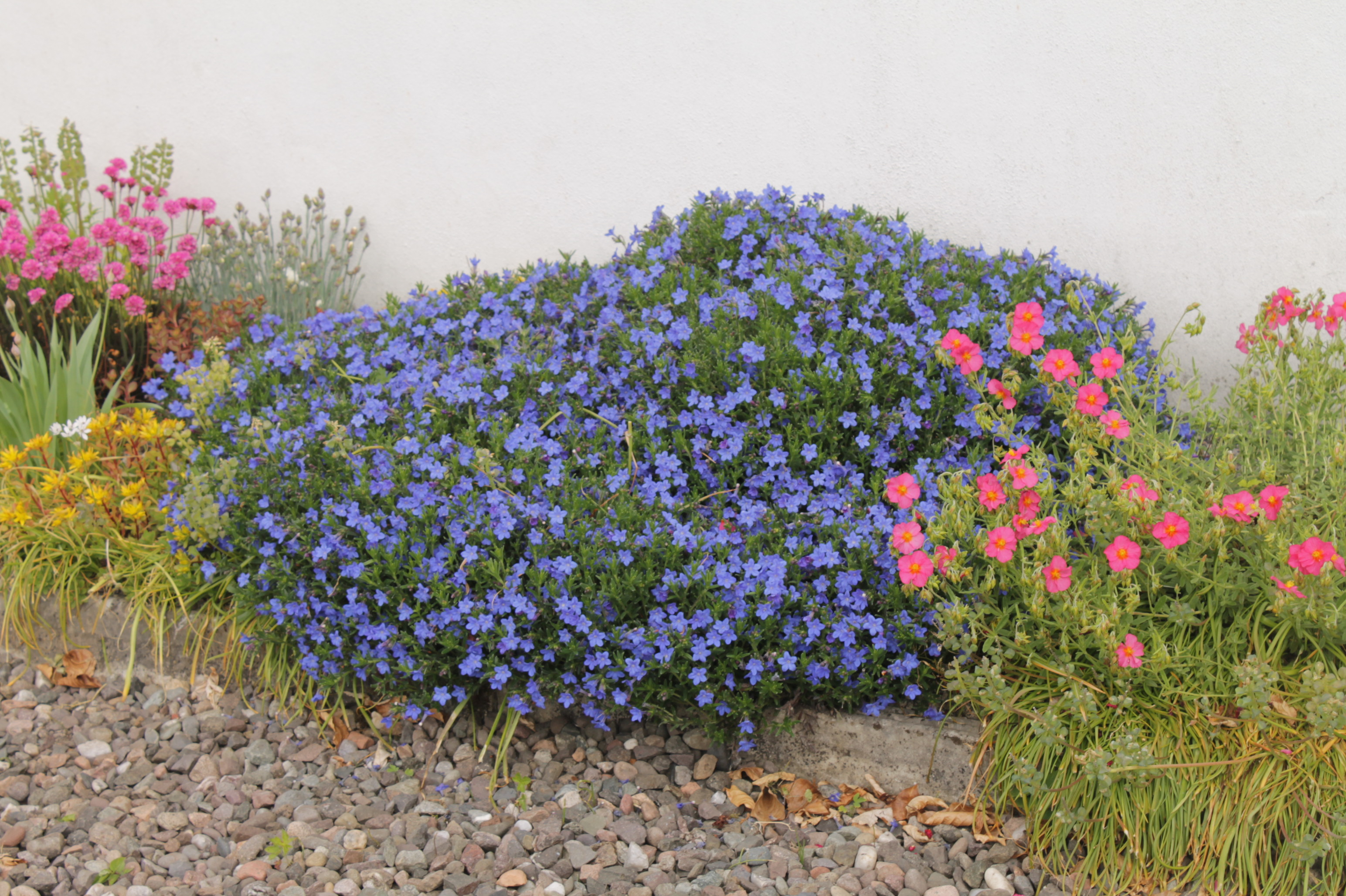
Lobelia erinus in an alpine border

Lobelia (/loʊˈbiːliə, lə-/) is a genus of flowering plants in the family Campanulaceae comprising 444 species, with a subcosmopolitan distribution primarily in tropical to warm temperate regions of the world, a few species extending into cooler temperate regions. They are known generally as lobelias.

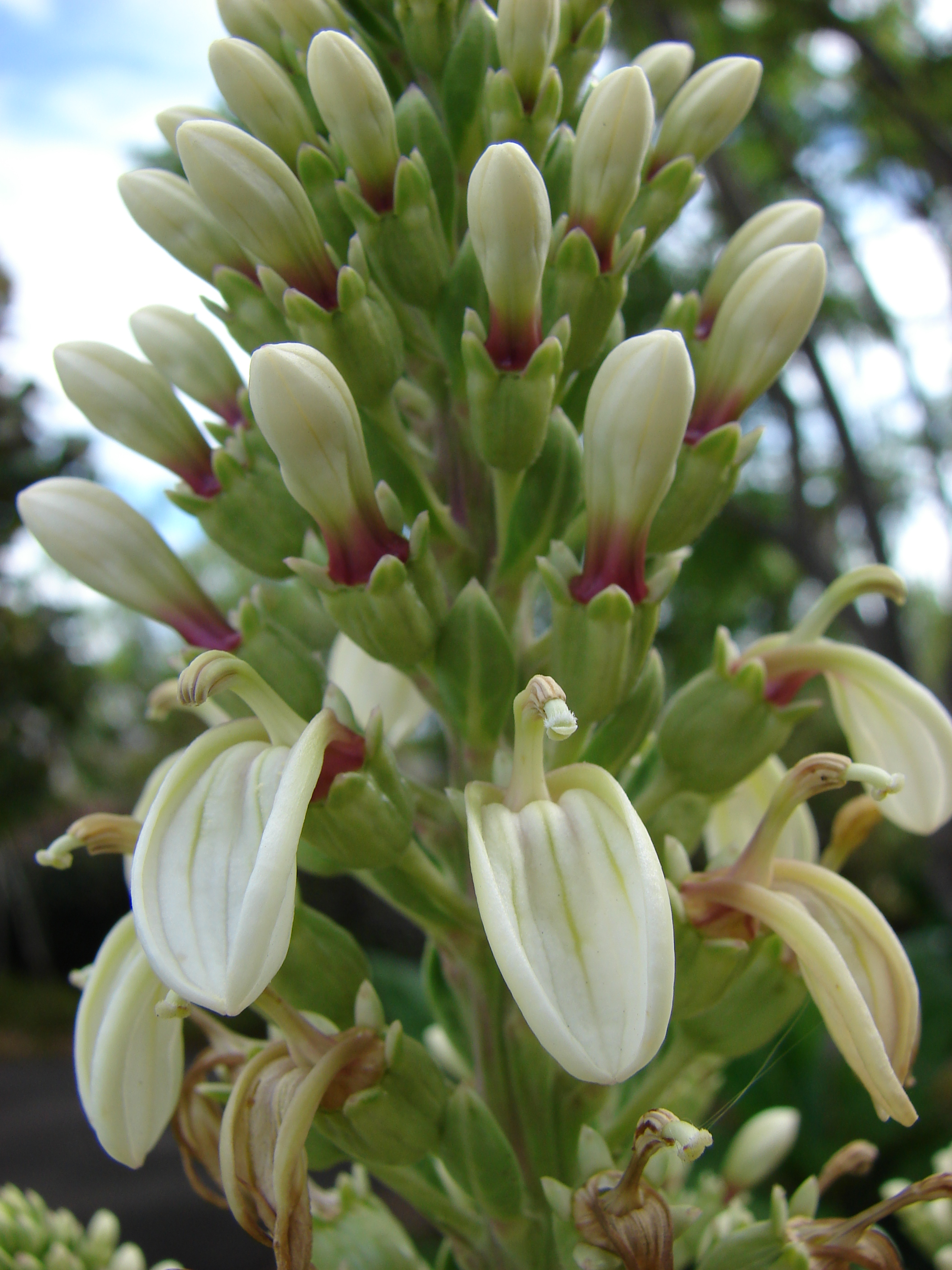
Lobelia boninensis

== Description ==
The genus Lobelia comprises a substantial number of large and small annual, perennial and shrubby species, hardy and tender, from a variety of habitats, in a range of colours. Many species appear totally dissimilar from each other. However, all have simple, alternate leaves and two-lipped tubular flowers, each with five lobes. The upper two lobes may be erect while the lower three lobes may be fanned out. Flowering is often abundant and the flower colour intense, hence their popularity as ornamental garden subjects.

== Taxonomy ==
The genus Lobelia was first formally described in 1753 by Carl Linnaeus in Species plantarum and was named after the Flemish botanist Matthias de Lobel (1538–1616).

Lobelia is probably the base form from which many other lobelioid genera are derived; it is therefore highly paraphyletic and not a good genus in a cladistic sense. For example, the Hawaiian species (see Hawaiian lobelioids), currently classified in several genera, originated from a single introduction to a now-submerged Hawaiian island 15 million years ago, probably from an Asian Lobelia in Lobelia subg. Tupa.

A New Zealand study concluded that local species of Hypsela, Isotoma and Pratia should be treated as Lobelia.

=== Species list ===
See List of Lobelia species

== Ecology ==
Lobelia species are used as food plants by the larvae of some Lepidoptera species including the Setaceous Hebrew Character.

== Cultivation and uses ==
Several species are cultivated as ornamental plants in gardens. These include Lobelia cardinalis syn. Lobelia fulgens (cardinal flower or Indian pink), Lobelia siphilitica (blue lobelia), and Lobelia erinus, which is used for edging and window boxes.

=== Hybrids ===
Numerous hybrids have been produced, notably Lobelia × speciosa, a hybrid derived from L. fulgens, L. cardinalis and L. siphilitica. The term "fan hybrids" is also used. This plant is borderline hardy and requires fertile, moist soil. It is suitable for summer bedding schemes or growing in containers. The cultivars 'Kompliment Scharlach' and 'Pink Elephant' have gained the Royal Horticultural Society's Award of Garden Merit.

=== Traditional medicine ===
The species used most commonly in modern herbalism is Lobelia inflata (Indian tobacco). Use of lobelia for cardiovascular diseases may cause adverse effects.

Lobelia has been used as an "asthmador" in Appalachian traditional medicine. Two species, L. siphilitica and L. cardinalis, were once considered a cure for syphilis. Herbalist Samuel Thomson popularized medicinal use of lobelia in the United States in the early 19th century.

== Adverse effects ==
Many members of the genus are considered poisonous, with some containing the toxic principle lobeline. Because of lobeline's similarity to nicotine, the internal use of lobelia may be dangerous to susceptible populations, including children, pregnant women, and individuals with cardiac disease. Excessive use will cause nausea and vomiting. It is not recommended for use by pregnant women and is best administered by a practitioner qualified in its use. It also has a chemical known as lobellicyonycin, which may cause dizziness.

== Chemical constituents ==
Lobelane

Isolobelanine

Extracts of Lobelia inflata contain lobeline and those from Lobelia chinensis contain apigenin, lobeline, lobelanine, isolobelanine, lobelanidine, quercetin, coumarins, glucosides and other flavonoids.

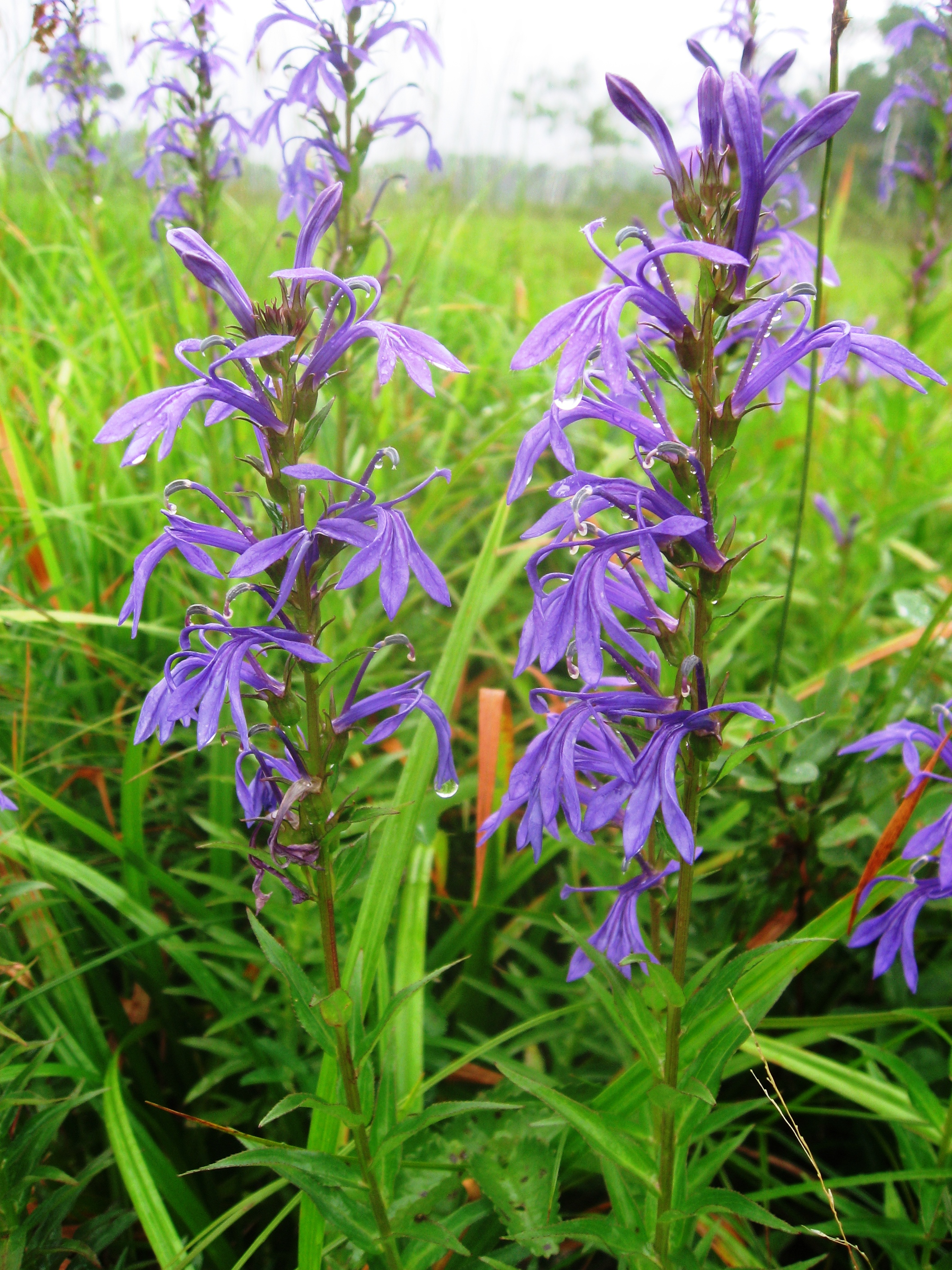
Lobelia sessilifolia

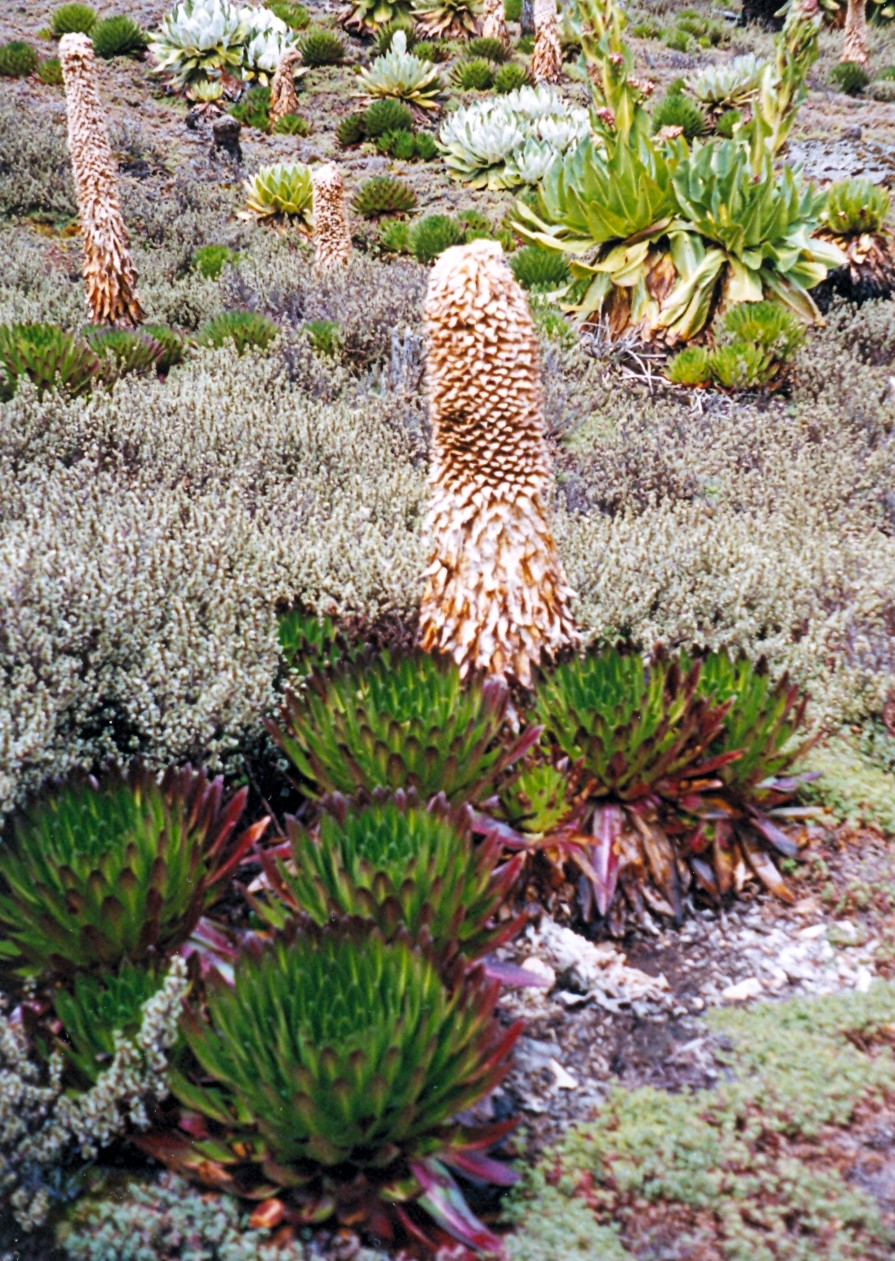
Giant lobelias (Lobelia deckenii), Mount Kenya

=== Mexican spurred lobelias ===
About eleven species native to Mexico and Central America have spurs on the flowers. These spurred lobelias appear to form a monophyletic group. Most have been classified in the genera Heterotoma (or sometimes Calcaratolobelia). However, since their closest relatives such as Lobelia anatina are in Lobelia, Koopman and Ayers classify them in Lobelia.

== Bibliography ==
- Everitt, J.H.; Lonard, R.L.; Little, C.R. (2007). Weeds in South Texas and Northern Mexico. Lubbock: Texas Tech University Press. ISBN 978-0-89672-614-7.
- Thomson, Samuel (1884) [1822]. "Life and Medical Discoveries of Samuel Thomson". Bulletin of the Lloyd Library of Botany, Pharmacy and Materia Medica. III (11).
