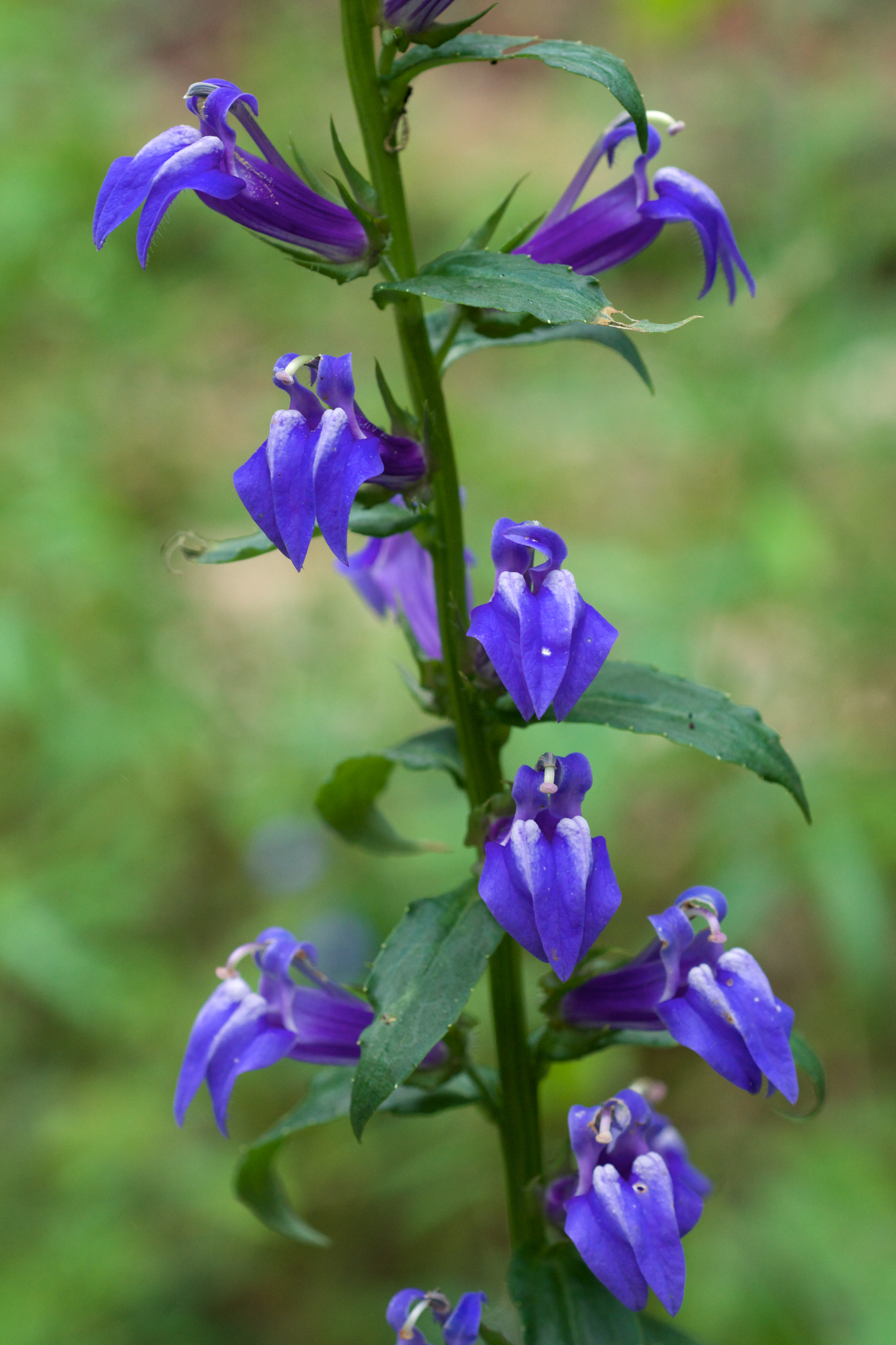

Conservation status
- Least Concern (IUCN 3.1)

- Secure (NatureServe)

Scientific classification
- Kingdom: Plantae
- Clade: Tracheophytes
- Clade: Angiosperms
- Clade: Eudicots
- Clade: Asterids
- Order: Asterales
- Family: Campanulaceae
- Genus: Lobelia
- Species: L. siphilitica

Binomial name
- Lobelia siphilitica L.
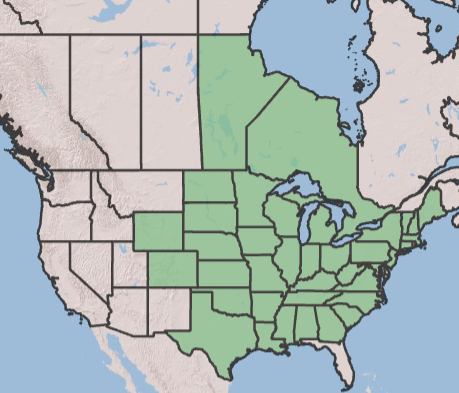

= Lobelia siphilitica =

Great blue lobelia

Species of flowering plant

Lobelia siphilitica, the great blue lobelia, great lobelia, or blue cardinal flower, is a plant species within the family Campanulaceae. It is an herbaceous perennial dicot native to eastern and central Canada and United States. There are two recognized varieties of Lobelia siphilitica, var. siphilitica and var. ludoviciana. Blooming from August to October, it is short-lived, lasting only for a few years.

Although self-compatible, a flower is unable to offer pollen to itself and it must be pollinated by insects, primarily bumblebees. Bees use the lower three fused petals as a landing pad. A bee of correct weight will depress these petals on its way to the flower's nectar, this lowers the stigma wiping it against the bee's back.

== Description ==
=== Morphology ===
Growing up to 4 feet (1.2 m) tall, Lobelia siphilitica has a single ridged, unbranched stem, which is smooth or sparsely hairy. Leaves are hairless or scarcely hairy, that vary in shape from elliptical to lance-like, slightly narrowing at the base. They are about 2 inches (51 mm) wide and 2 to 6 in (51 to 152 mm) in length. Leaves are alternately attached to the stem with no leaf stalk. The root system is a central taproot, that occasionally produces basal offshoots.

The plant produces a spike of zygomorphic flowers in the late summer. The flowers are more closely clustered towards the top of the raceme and become more infrequent further down with the lower flowers begin blooming first. Great lobelia flowers are notably larger than many other lobelia species. Flowers are typically blue or violet, but can be lighter, even white and are usually about 1 in (25 mm) long. The tubed portion of the flower is often striped. Great lobelia flowers have five petals; the three lower petals are fused, and the two upper petals are usually curled back. A curved style pokes between the upper two petals. The lower center lobe is wider and has two small bumps near the throat that are typically lighter in coloration. Seed pods are two-chambered with an auriculate base and have many small seeds. Seeds are ovular, translucent, and golden brown and are presumed to be distributed by wind or water.

== Distribution and habitat ==
Great lobelia is found in the north from Maine to Manitoba and in the south from North Carolina to Texas. Sparse populations can be found as far west as Wyoming and Colorado.

It thrives in moist to wet soils and partially shaded environments, including swamp forests, roadside ditches, floodplains, lake margins, and wet prairies.

== Cultivation ==
Lobelia siphilitica is sold in garden centers and is often grown in zones 4 to 9. It can be propagated either by cutting or seed.

== Uses ==
Native Americans traditionally use Lobelia siphilitica to treat respiratory and muscle disorders. It was once considered a cure for syphilis by early European settlers, which is where the scientific name for the species originates.
