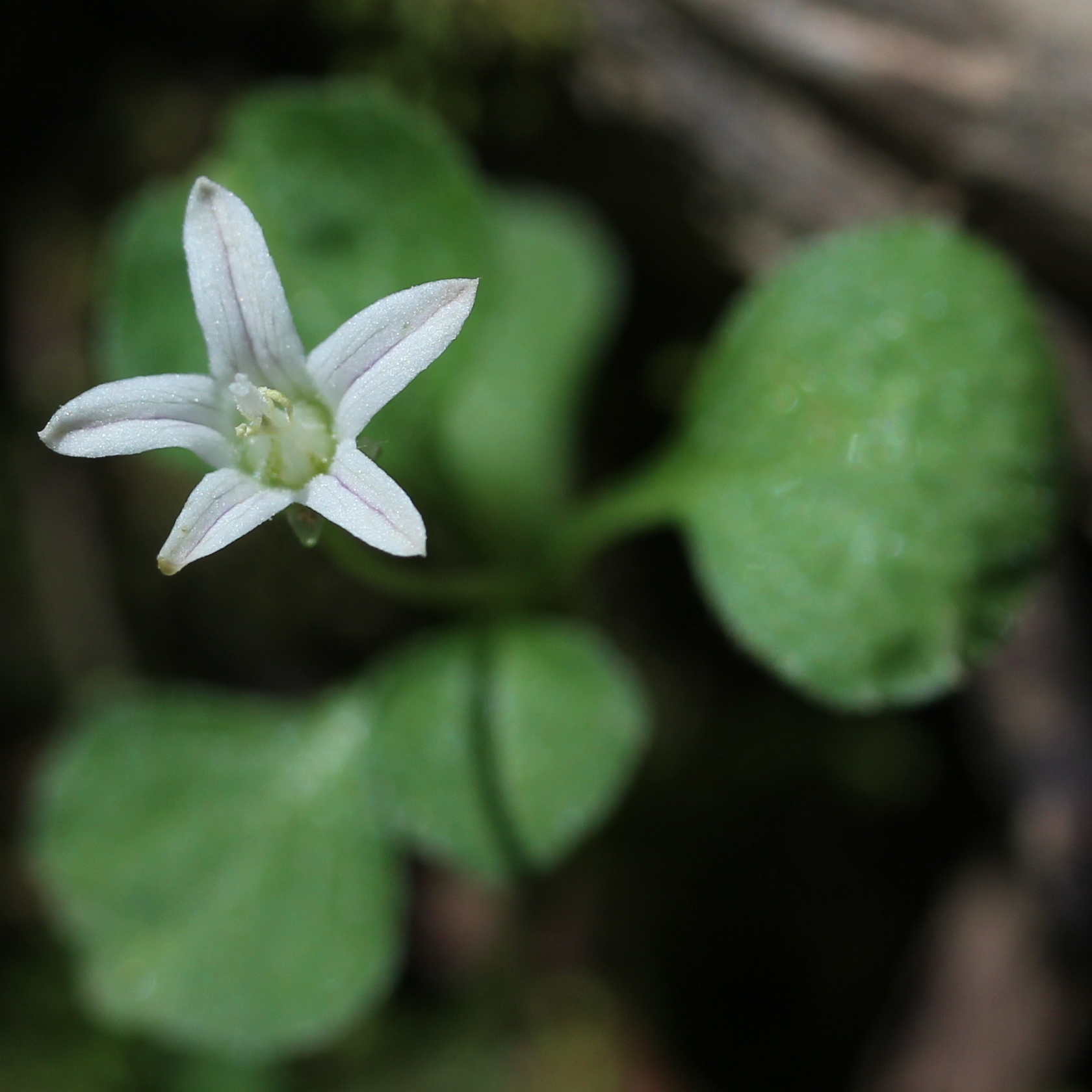

Scientific classification
- Kingdom: Plantae
- Clade: Tracheophytes
- Clade: Angiosperms
- Clade: Eudicots
- Clade: Asterids
- Order: Asterales
- Family: Campanulaceae
- Subfamily: Campanuloideae
- Genus: Peracarpa; Hook.f. & Thomson (1857)
- Species: P. carnosa

Binomial name
- Peracarpa carnosa (Wall.) Hook.f. & Thomson (1857)

Synonyms
- Campanula carnosa Wall. (1824); Campanula circaeoides F.Schmidt ex Miq. (1867); Campanula ovata (D.Don) Spreng. (1827); Peracarpa carnosa var. circaeoides (F.Schmidt ex Miq.) Makino (1940); Peracarpa carnosa var. formosana H.Hara (1947); Peracarpa carnosa var. kiusiana H.Hara (1947); Peracarpa carnosa f. macrantha Nakai ex H.Hara (1947); Peracarpa carnosa var. pumila H.Hara (1947); Peracarpa circaeoides (F.Schmidt ex Miq.) Feer (1890); Peracarpa luzonica Rolfe (1906); Wahlenbergia ovata D.Don (1825)

= Peracarpa =

Genus of plants

Peracarpa is a genus of flowering plants belonging to the family Campanulaceae. It contains a single species, Peracarpa carnosa, a perennial which ranges from the Russian Far East to tropical Asia and New Guinea.

Peracarpa is part of Peracarpeae, a small tribe with three genera: Homocodon, Heterocodon, and Peracarpa. The systemic position of the Peracarpa is unclear since it has not been sampled within phylogenetic studies.
