= Capsule (fruit) =

Type of simple, dehiscent fruit

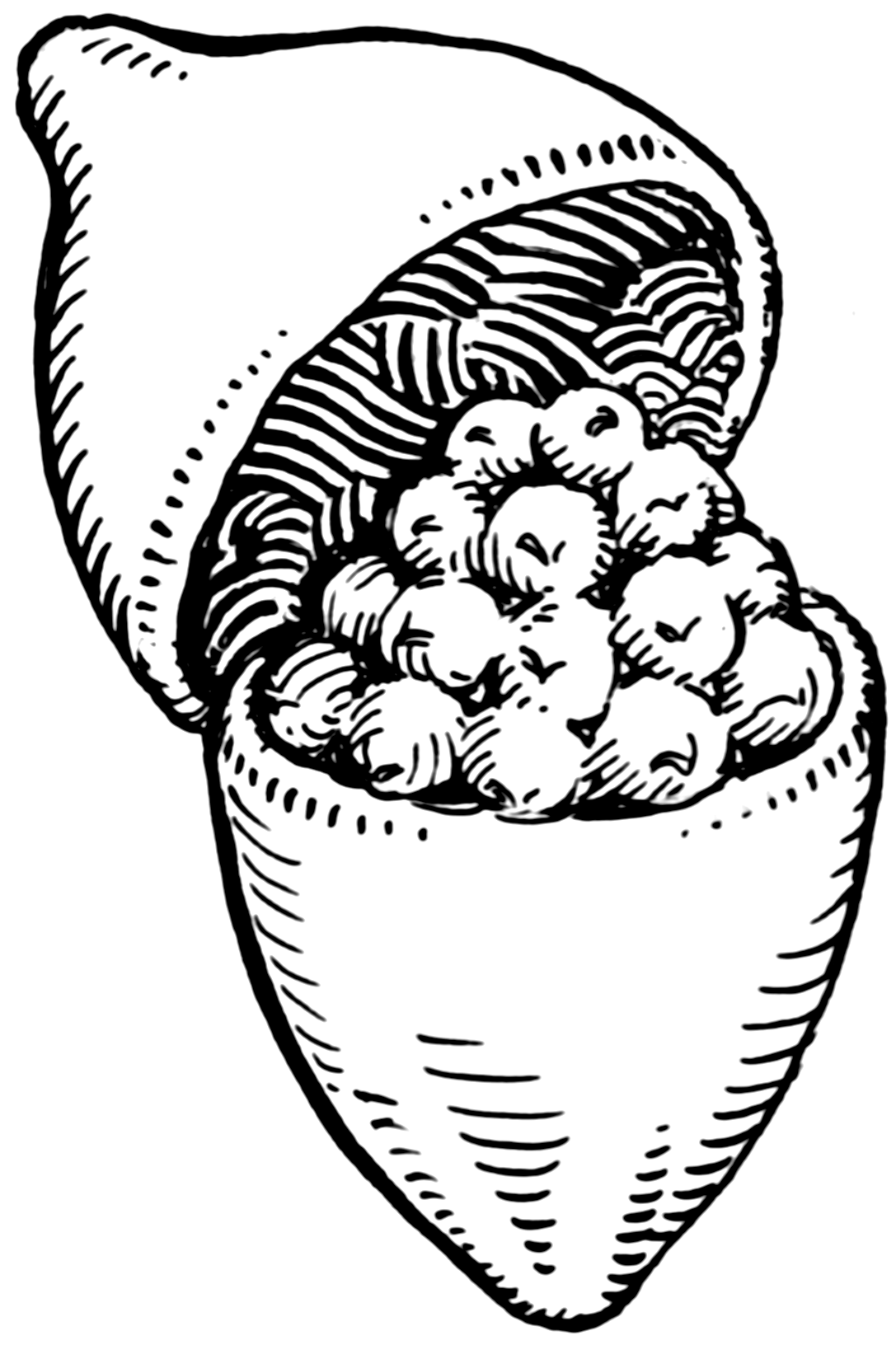
A line art drawing of a pyxidium

In botany, a capsule is a type of simple, dry or (rarely) fleshy, fruit which splits open on maturity. They are produced by many species of flowering plants.

== Origins and structure ==
The capsule (Latin: capsula, small box) is derived from a compound (multicarpellary) ovary. A capsule is a structure composed of two or more carpels. In (flowering plants), the term locule (or cell) is used to refer to a chamber within the fruit. Depending on the number of locules in the ovary, fruit can be classified as uni-locular (unilocular), bi-locular, tri-locular or multi-locular. The number of locules present in a gynoecium may be equal to or less than the number of carpels. The locules contain the ovules or seeds and are separated by septa.

== Dehiscence ==
In most cases the capsule is dehiscent, i.e. at maturity, it splits apart (dehisces) to release the seeds within. A few capsules are indehiscent, for example those of Adansonia digitata, Alphitonia, and Merciera. Capsules are often classified into four types, depending on the type and location of dehiscence (see Simpson Fig 9.41 and Hickey & King).

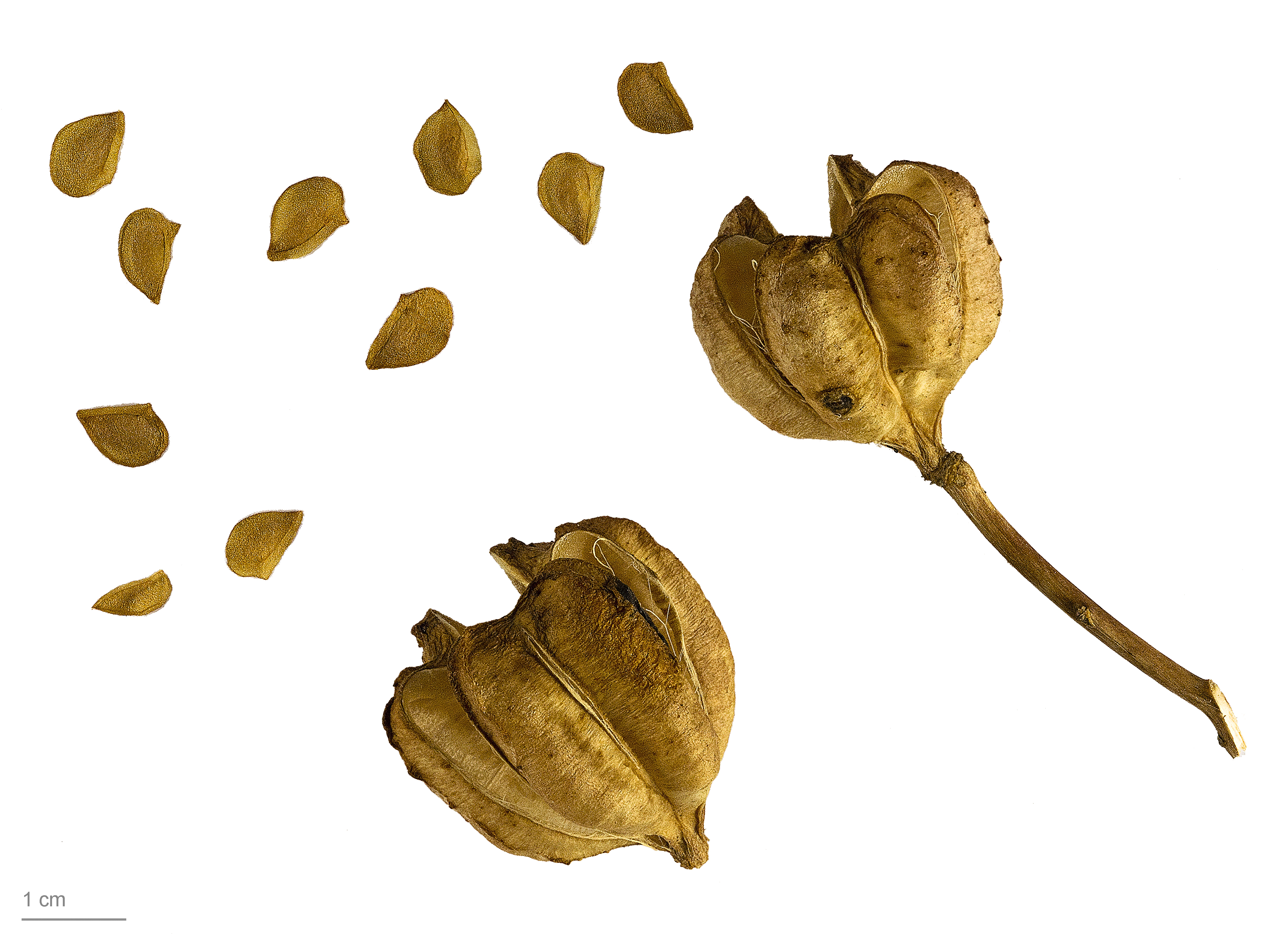
Lilium candidum dehiscing

Loculicidal capsules possess longitudinal lines of dehiscence radially aligned with the locules, i.e. not at the septa, along the midrib or dorsal suture (seam) of the locules. If septa are absent, the dehiscence lines lie between the placentae. This type is common among many members of the Liliaceae such as Lilium (see illustration).

Septicidal capsules have dehiscence lines aligned with the sutures of the ovary septa or placentae, that is between the carpels.

Both loculicidal and septicidal capsules split into distinguishable segments called valves. The valves are a part of the pericarp (fruit wall) that has split away, without enclosing the seed or seeds. The borders of the valves may or may not coincide with the borders of carpels. These valves may remain attached to the fruit or fall off. In septicidal capsules the valves remain in place. In some capsules, the split occurs between carpels, and in others each carpel splits open.

Circumscissile capsules (pyxide, pyxis, pyxidium or lid capsule) have a transverse, rather than longitudinal, dehiscence line, so that the upper part of the capsule dehisces, usually forming a terminal lid (operculum) that opens (see illustration). An example is Plantago. A variant is the Septifragal capsule (valvular capsule) in which the outer walls break away from the septa and (usually axile) placentae as valves.

Poricidal capsules dehisce through pores (openings) in the capsule, as in Papaver, the seeds escaping through these pores.

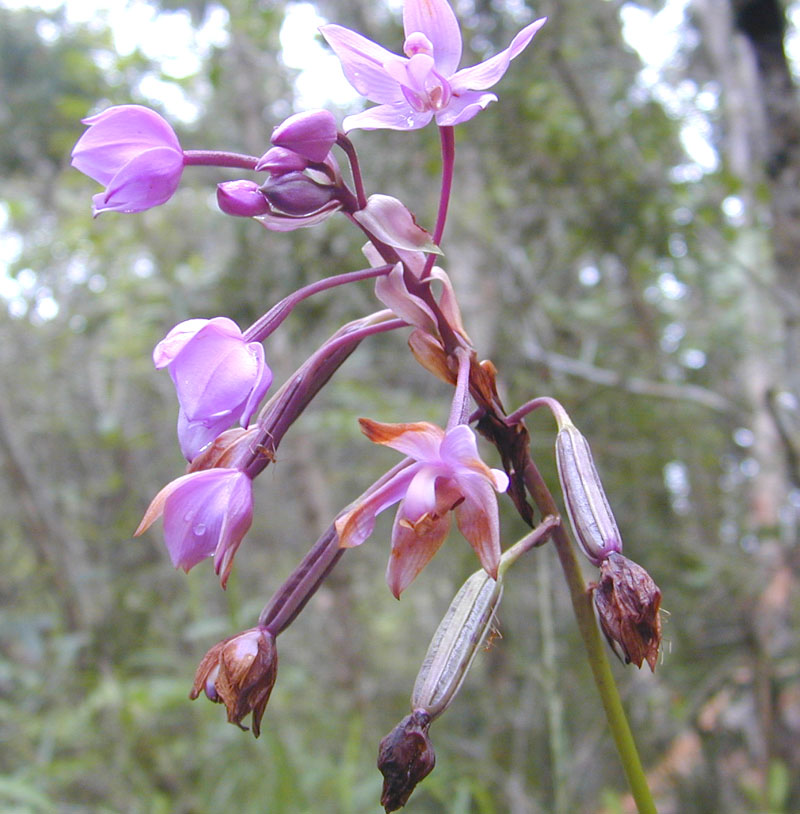
Flowers and developing fruit capsules of the ground orchid Spathoglottis plicata

Examples of other plants that produce capsules include nigella, orchid, willow, cotton, and jimson weed.

== Specialised capsules ==
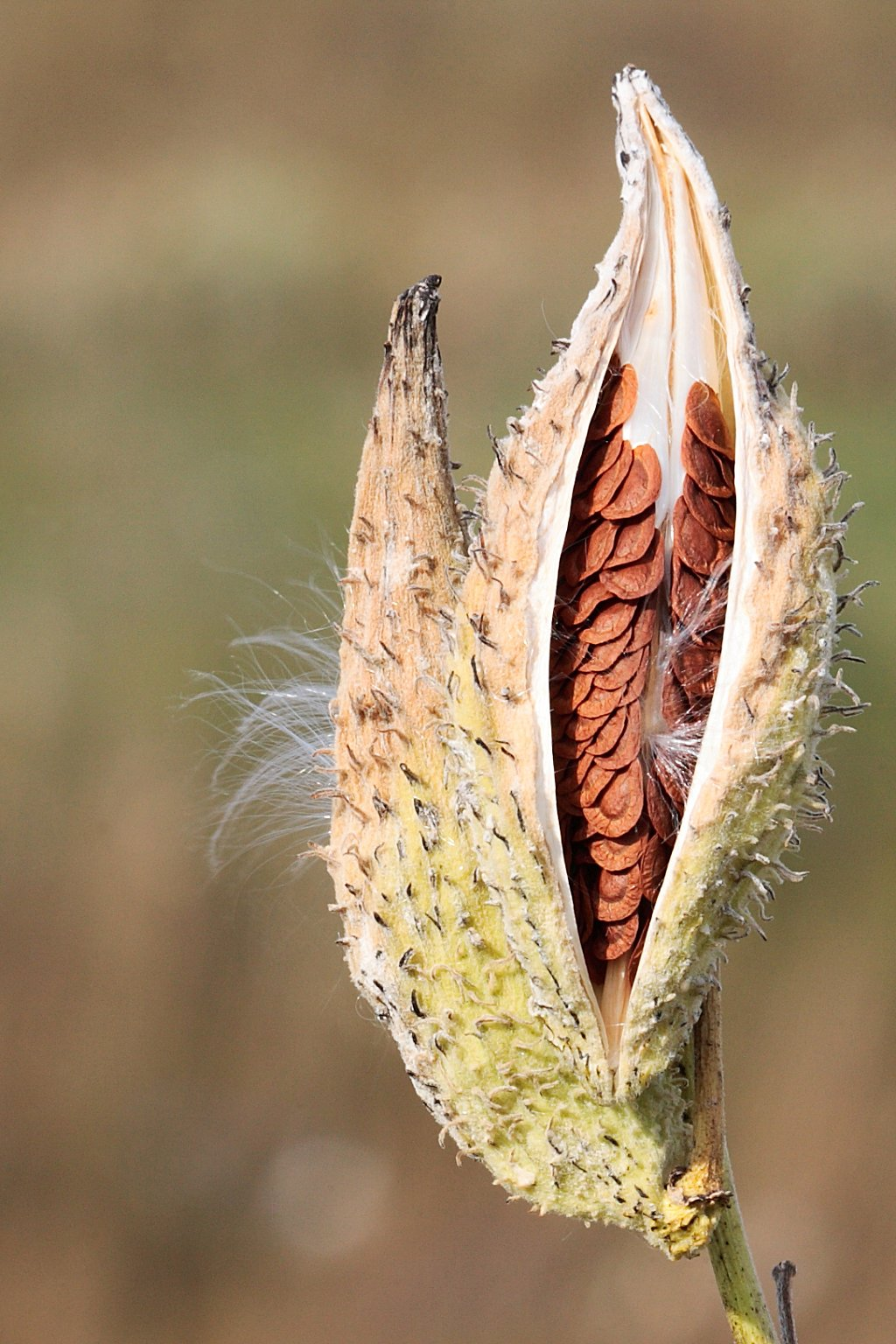
Dehiscence of the follicular capsule of Asclepias syriaca

Some dry dehiscent fruits form specialised capsule-like structures. A follicle is derived from a single carpel that splits along a suture, as in Magnolia, while a legume splits along two sutures, and are a defining feature of the Fabaceae. Some variants of legumes that have retained vestigial sutures include loments that split transversely into segments, each with a single seed, and indehiscent legumes, such as Arachis hypogaea (peanuts). Capsules derived from two carpels include silicles and siliques that dehisce along two suture lines but retain a partition called the replum, which is a septum with attached seeds. While both are characteristic of Brassicaceae, silicles have a ratio of length to width of no more than 3:1. A schizocarp is derived from a compound ovary with two or more locules which then separate radially as one of the above types, such as a schizocarp of follicles, as in Asclepias (Asclepiadoideae) (see illustration).

A mericarp is a portion of the fruit that separates from the ovary to form a distinct locule unit which encloses the seed, usually-nut-like, as in Apiaceae in which the mericarps are joined by a stalk (carpophore). Thus a schizocarp of mericarps is a structure in which the carpels of a single ovary split to form mericarps. A schizocarp of nutlets is derived from a carpel that becomes lobed, and the lobes become nutlets that split apart. Examples include Boraginaceae and most Lamiaceae, where the styles are attached between the ovary lobes.

== Nuts ==
Capsules are sometimes mislabeled as nuts, as in the example of the Brazil nut or the Horse-chestnut. A capsule is not a nut because it releases its seeds and it splits apart. Nuts, on the other hand, do not release seeds as they are a compound ovary containing both a single seed and the fruit. Nuts also do not split. In the Brazil nut, a lid on the capsule opens, but is too small to release the dozen or so seeds (the actual "Brazil nut" of commerce) within. These germinate inside the capsule after it falls to the ground.

== See also ==
- Fruit

== Bibliography ==
- Simpson, Michael G. (2011). Plant Systematics. Academic Press. ISBN 978-0-08-051404-8.
- Dahlgren, R.M.; Clifford, H.T.; Yeo, P.F. (1985). The families of the monocotyledons. Berlin: Springer-Verlag. ISBN 978-3-642-64903-5.
- Hickey, Michael; King, Clive (2000). The Cambridge illustrated glossary of botanical terms. Cambridge: Cambridge University Press. ISBN 978-0-521-79401-5.
- Encyclopædia Britannica online
- The seed site
