= Romanus Adolf Hedwig =

German botanist

- Born: 1772
- Died: 1806 (aged 33–34)
- Known for: Botany
- Scientific career
- Fields: Botany
- Workplaces: University of Leipzig
- Author abbrev. (botany): R.Hedw.

Romanus Adolf Hedwig (1772 – 1806), sometimes styled as Romano Adolpho Hedwigio or simply R.A.H., was a German botanist best known for his studies into pteridophytes, spermatophytes, mycology, and bryology. He is the son of notable bryologist Johann Hedwig. The standard author abbreviation R.Hedw. is used to indicate this person as the author when citing a botanical name.

Romanus worked closely with his father, illustrating the publication Filicum genera et species recentiori methodo accomodatae analytice descriptae in 1799. Following in his late father's footsteps, he was appointed as the Professor of Botany at the University of Leipzig in 1801. Romanus became good friends with Augustin Pyramus de Candolle, and the two would often send correspondences and exchange specimens. Romanus was personally thanked for his contributions in de Candolle's publication Flore française etc. 1815. Upon the death of Romanus in 1806, his personal herbarium was sold with some material being incorporated into his father's collection.

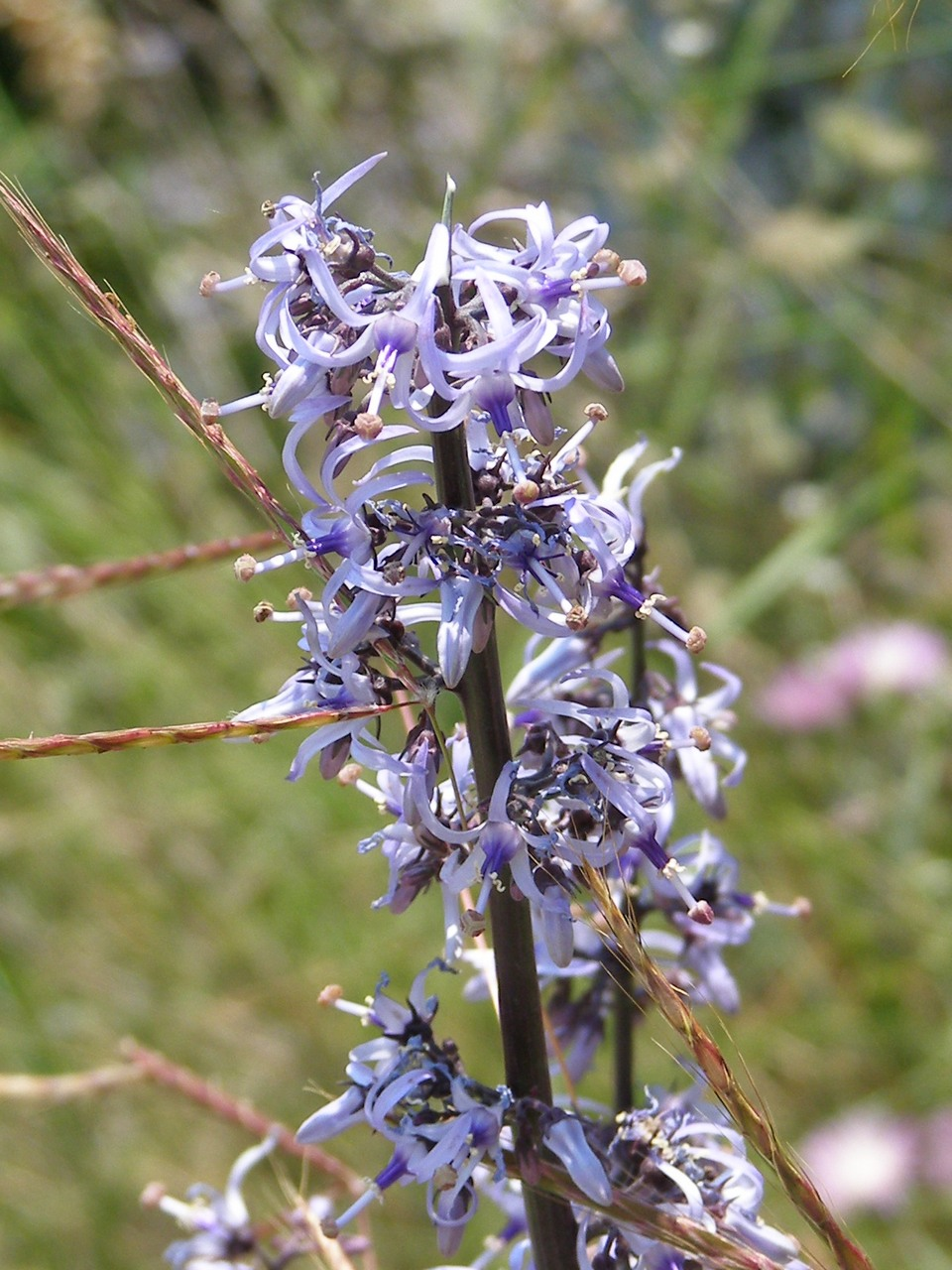
Petromarula pinnata is the sole species of the genus Petromarula, which was reclassified by Hedwig in 1806.

== Published works ==
- Disquisitio ampullularum Lieberkühnii Physico-microscopica. Sectio prima etc. Barth. 1797.
- Tremella nostoch: Commentatio etc. ex officina Bueschelia. 1798.
- Observationum botanicarum fasciculus primus. in Bibliopolio Schaeferiano. 1802.
- Hedwig, Romanus Adolph; Brisseau-Mirbel, Charles-François (1806). Genera plantarum secundum characteres differentiales ad Mirbelii editionem revisa et aucta edenda curavit.
