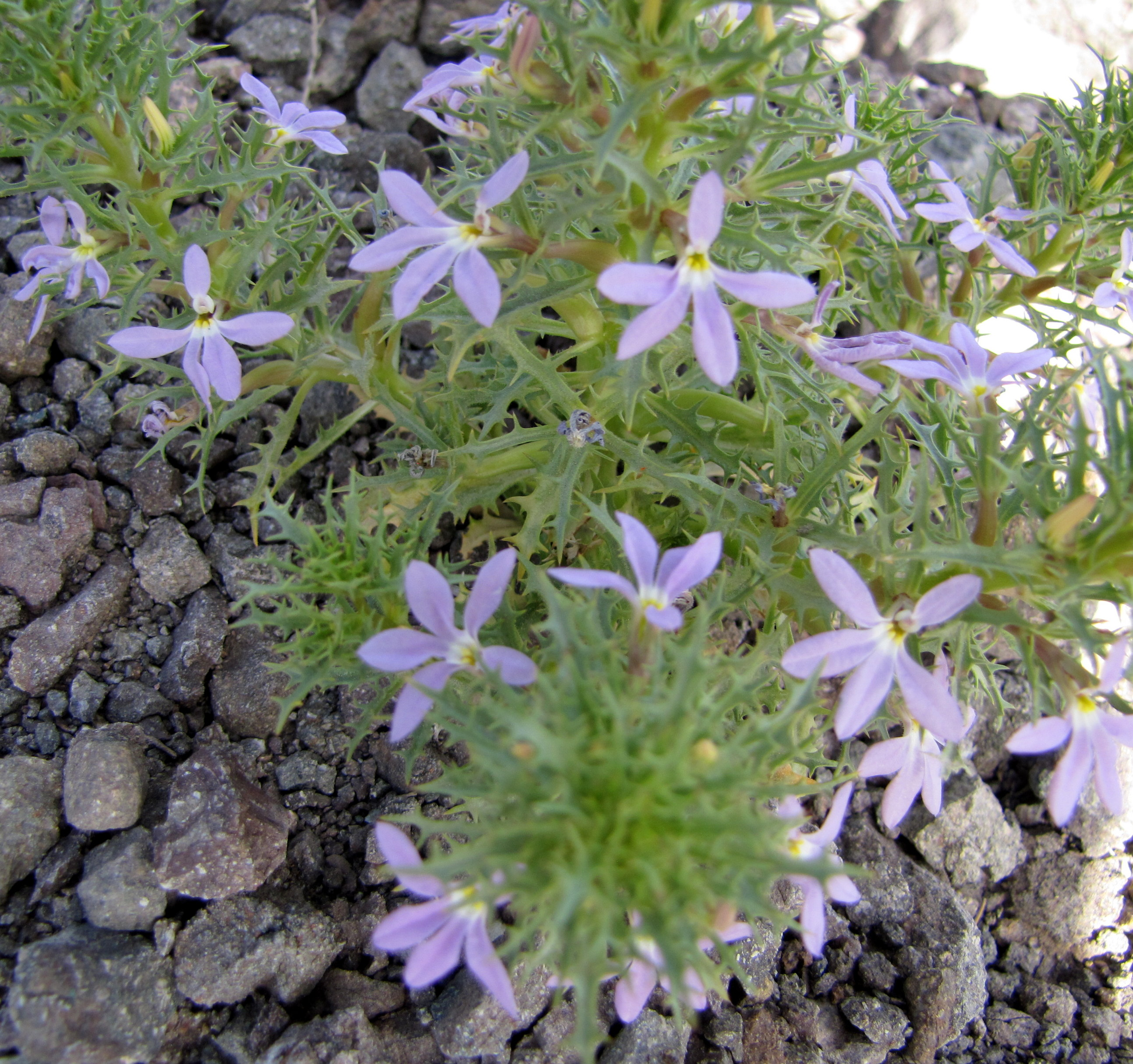
- Cyphocarpus rigenscens

Scientific classification
- Kingdom: Plantae
- Clade: Tracheophytes
- Clade: Angiosperms
- Clade: Eudicots
- Clade: Asterids
- Order: Asterales
- Family: Campanulaceae
- Subfamily: Cyphocarpoideae
- Genus: Cyphocarpus; Miers

Type species
- Cyphocarpus rigescens Miers

= Cyphocarpus =

Genus of flowering plants

Cyphocarpus is a genus of flowering plants in the Campanulaceae. It has been placed in its own subfamily, Cyphocarpoideae. It contains four known species, all endemic to Chile.

- Cyphocarpus innocuus Sandwith
- Cyphocarpus perennis Santilli & Lavandero
- Cyphocarpus psammophilus Ricardi
- Cyphocarpus rigescens Miers
