= Wimmeranthus =

Scientific classification
- Kingdom: Plantae
- Clade: Tracheophytes
- Clade: Angiosperms
- Clade: Eudicots
- Clade: Asterids
- Order: Asterales
- Family: Campanulaceae
- Genus: Wimmeranthus; Rzed. (2018)
- Species: W. inopinatus

Binomial name
- Wimmeranthus inopinatus Rzed. (2018)

Genus of flowering plants

Wimmeranthus is a genus of flowering plants belonging to the family Campanulaceae. It contains a single species, Wimmeranthus inopinatus, an annual endemic to Oaxaca in southwestern Mexico.

It is known from a specimen collected near San Juan Mixtepec in the Sierra Madre del Sur of Oaxaca, growing in a forest of Juniperus flaccida, Annona cherimola, and Bursera bipinnata on shallow and rocky soil at 1,800 meters elevation.
