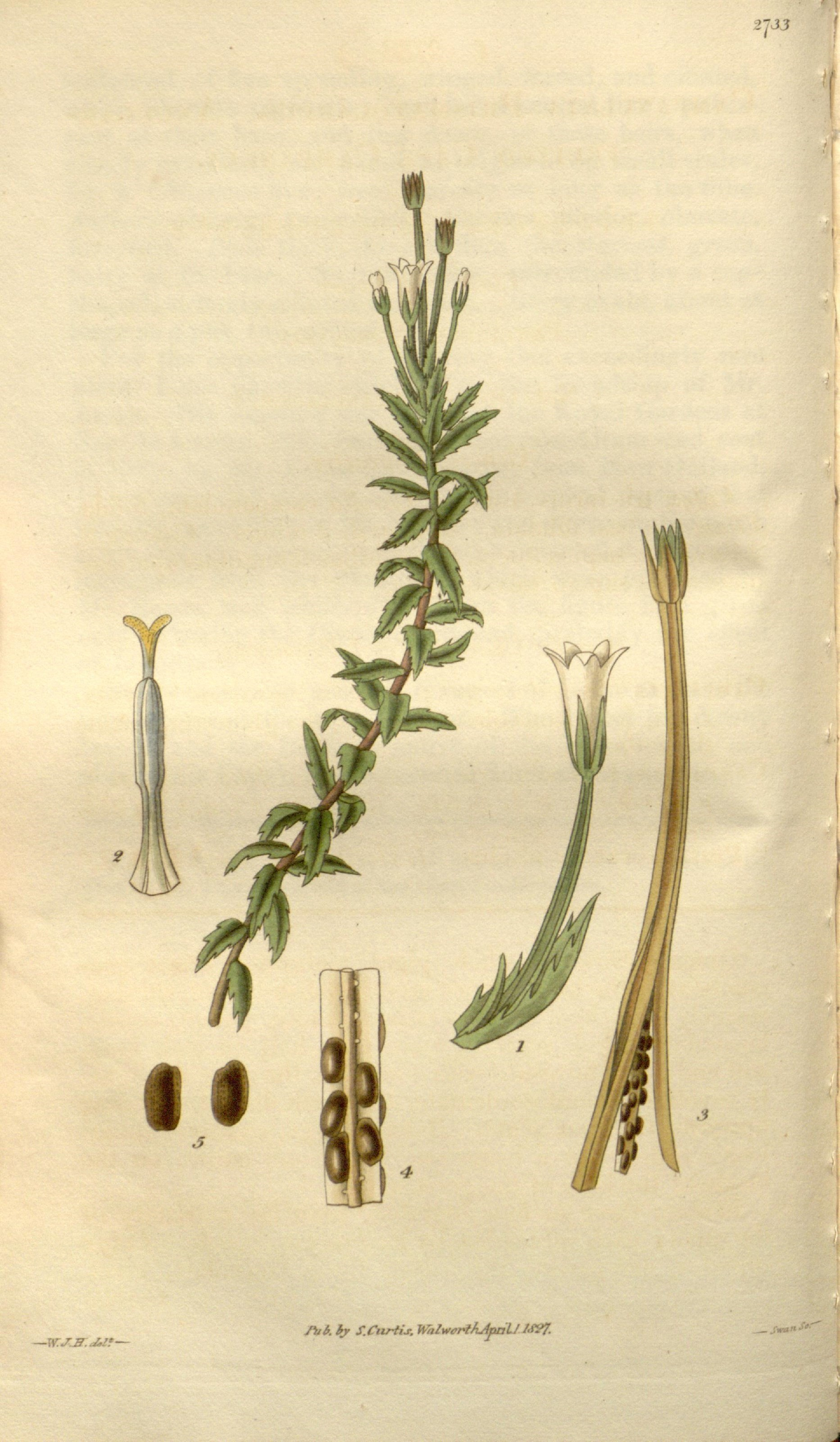
- Curtis's botanical magazine (Plate 2733)

Scientific classification
- Kingdom: Plantae
- Clade: Tracheophytes
- Clade: Angiosperms
- Clade: Eudicots
- Clade: Asterids
- Order: Asterales
- Family: Campanulaceae
- Subfamily: Campanuloideae
- Genus: Prismatocarpus; L'Hér.

Species
- 27; see text

Synonyms
- Codiphus Raf.; Concilium Raf.

= Prismatocarpus =

Genus of flowering plants

Prismatocarpus is a genus of flowering plants belonging to the family Campanulaceae. First described in 1789, this genus includes 27 species endemic to the Cape Provinces of South Africa.

== Species ==
27 species are accepted.

- Prismatocarpus alpinus (Bond) Adamson
- Prismatocarpus altiflorus L'Hér.
- Prismatocarpus brevilobus A.DC.
- Prismatocarpus campanuloides (L.) Sond.
- Prismatocarpus candolleanus Cham.
- Prismatocarpus cliffortioides Adamson
- Prismatocarpus cordifolius Adamson
- Prismatocarpus debilis Bolus ex Adamson
- Prismatocarpus decurrens Adamson
- Prismatocarpus diffusus (L.f.) A.DC.
- Prismatocarpus fastigiatus C.Presl ex A.DC.
- Prismatocarpus fruticosus (L.) L'Hér.
- Prismatocarpus hispidus Adamson
- Prismatocarpus implicatus Adamson
- Prismatocarpus lasiophyllus Adamson
- Prismatocarpus lycioides Adamson
- Prismatocarpus lycopodioides A.DC.
- Prismatocarpus nitidus L'Hér.
- Prismatocarpus pauciflorus Adamson
- Prismatocarpus pedunculatus (P.J.Bergius) A.DC.
- Prismatocarpus pilosus Adamson
- Prismatocarpus rogersii Fourc.
- Prismatocarpus schlechteri Adamson
- Prismatocarpus sessilis Eckl. ex A.DC.
- Prismatocarpus spinosus Adamson
- Prismatocarpus tenellus Oliv.
- Prismatocarpus tenerrimus H.Buek
