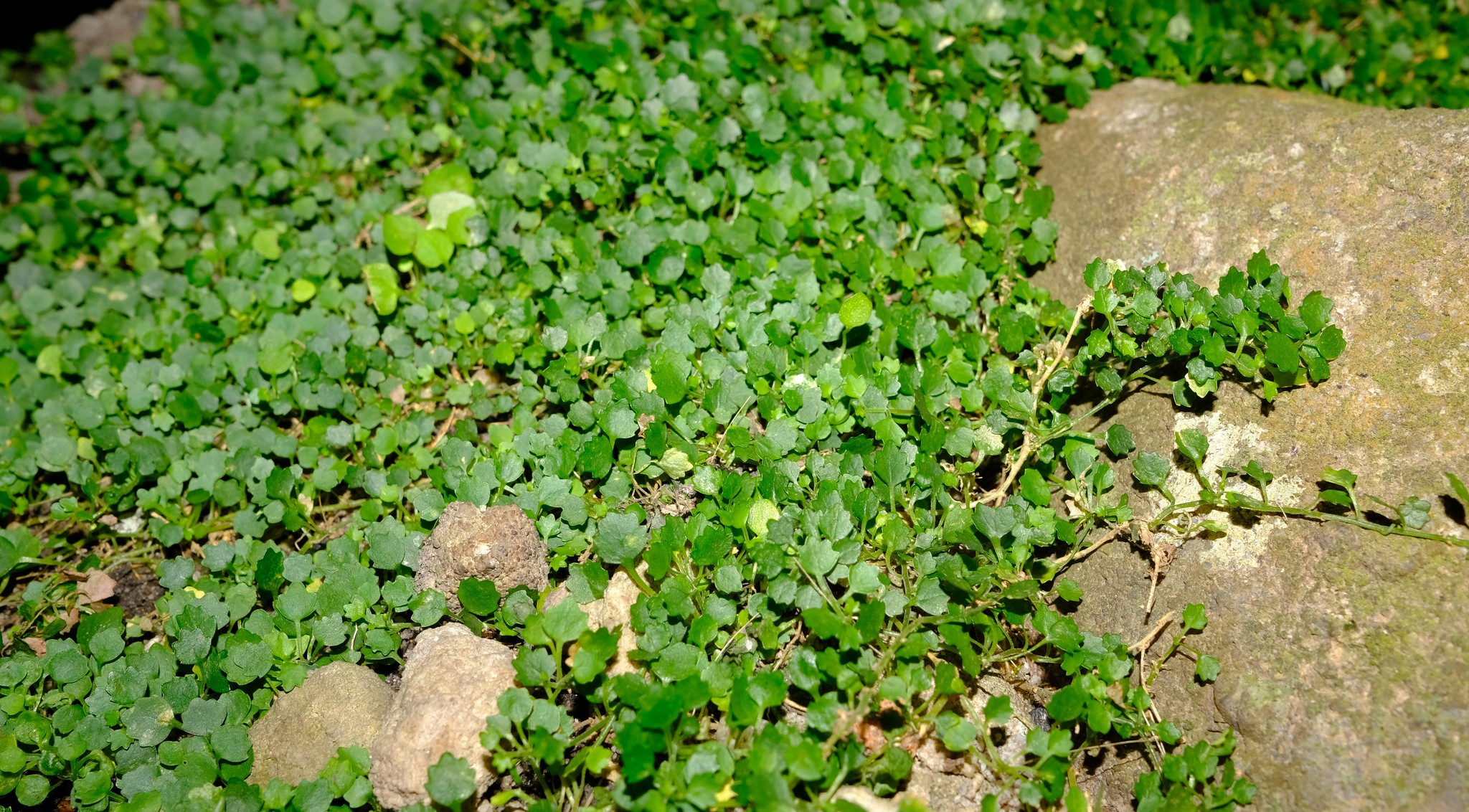
- Wimmerella hedyotidea

Scientific classification
- Kingdom: Plantae
- Clade: Tracheophytes
- Clade: Angiosperms
- Clade: Eudicots
- Clade: Asterids
- Order: Asterales
- Family: Campanulaceae
- Subfamily: Lobelioideae
- Genus: Wimmerella; Serra, M.B.Crespo & Lammers

= Wimmerella =

Genus of flowering plants

Wimmerella is a genus of flowering plants belonging to the family Campanulaceae. It is also in the Lobelioideae subfamily.

It is native to the Cape Provinces and KwaZulu-Natal within South Africa.

== Known species ==
There are 10 accepted species;

- Wimmerella arabidea (C.Presl) Serra, M.B.Crespo & Lammers
- Wimmerella bifida (Thunb.) Serra, M.B.Crespo & Lammers
- Wimmerella frontidentata (E.Wimm.) Serra, M.B.Crespo & Lammers
- Wimmerella giftbergensis (E.Phillips) Serra, M.B.Crespo & Lammers
- Wimmerella hederacea (Sond.) Serra, M.B.Crespo & Lammers
- Wimmerella hedyotidea (Schltr.) Serra, M.B.Crespo & Lammers
- Wimmerella longitubus (E.Wimm.) Serra, M.B.Crespo & Lammers
- Wimmerella mariae (E.Wimm.) Serra, M.B.Crespo & Lammers
- Wimmerella pygmaea (Thunb.) Serra, M.B.Crespo & Lammers
- Wimmerella secunda (L.f.) Serra, M.B.Crespo & Lammers

The genus name of Wimmerella is in honour of Franz Elfried Wimmer (1881–1961), an Austrian clergyman and botanist, also professor of natural history in Istanbul, Turkey and specialist in Lobeliaceae. It was first described and published in Novon Vol.9 on page 415 in 1999.
