= Cylindrocarpa =

Scientific classification
- Kingdom: Plantae
- Clade: Tracheophytes
- Clade: Angiosperms
- Clade: Eudicots
- Clade: Asterids
- Order: Asterales
- Family: Campanulaceae
- Subfamily: Campanuloideae
- Genus: Cylindrocarpa; Regel
- Species: C. sewerzowii

Binomial name
- Cylindrocarpa sewerzowii (Regel) Regel

Synonyms
- Phyteuma sewerzowii Regel; Euregelia sewerzowii (Regel) Kuntze; Euregelia Kuntze

Genus of flowering plants

Cylindrocarpa is a genus of plants in the Campanulaceae. There is only one known species, Cylindrocarpa sewerzowii, endemic to Kyrgyzstan. It has been found only in the Gory Naryntau mountain range, part of the Tien-Shan chain.
