= Echinocodon =

Scientific classification
- Kingdom: Plantae
- Clade: Tracheophytes
- Clade: Angiosperms
- Clade: Eudicots
- Clade: Asterids
- Order: Asterales
- Family: Campanulaceae
- Subfamily: Campanuloideae
- Genus: Echinocodon; D.Y.Hong
- Species: E. lobophyllus

Binomial name
- Echinocodon lobophyllus D.Y.Hong

Genus of flowering plants

Echinocodon is a genus of plants in the family Campanulaceae. There is only one known species, Echinocodon lobophyllus, endemic to the Chinese Province of Hubei.
