= Himalacodon =

Scientific classification
- Kingdom: Plantae
- Clade: Tracheophytes
- Clade: Angiosperms
- Clade: Eudicots
- Clade: Asterids
- Order: Asterales
- Family: Campanulaceae
- Genus: Himalacodon; D.Y.Hong & Qiang Wang
- Species: H. dicentrifolius

Binomial name
- Himalacodon dicentrifolius (C.B.Clarke) D.Y.Hong & Qiang Wang

Synonyms
- Campanopsis dicentrifolia (C.B.Clarke) Kuntze; Codonopsis dicentrifolia (C.B.Clarke) W.W.Sm.; Wahlenbergia dicentrifolia C.B.Clarke (1881) (basionym)

Genus of flowering plants

Himalacodon is a genus of flowering plants in the family Campanulaceae. It includes a single species, Himalacodon dicentrifolius, a perennial native to the central and eastern Himalayas and southern Tibet.
