= Zeugandra =

Scientific classification
- Kingdom: Plantae
- Clade: Tracheophytes
- Clade: Angiosperms
- Clade: Eudicots
- Clade: Asterids
- Order: Asterales
- Family: Campanulaceae
- Subfamily: Campanuloideae
- Genus: Zeugandra; P.H.Davis (1951)

Type species
- Zeugandra iranica P.H.Davis
- Zeugandra is endemic to Iran

Genus of flowering plants

Zeugandra is a genus of plants in the family Campanulaceae. It contains two known species, both endemic to Iran.

- Zeugandra iranica P.H.Davis - 1951
- Zeugandra iranshahrii Esfand. - 1980
