= Pseudonemacladus =

Scientific classification
- Kingdom: Plantae
- Clade: Tracheophytes
- Clade: Angiosperms
- Clade: Eudicots
- Clade: Asterids
- Order: Asterales
- Family: Campanulaceae
- Subfamily: Nemacladoideae
- Genus: Pseudonemacladus; McVaugh
- Species: P. oppositifolius

Binomial name
- Pseudonemacladus oppositifolius (B.L.Rob.) McVaugh

Synonyms
- Genus: Baclea Greene 1893, illegitimate homonym, not E. Fourn. ex Baill. 1877; Species: Nemacladus oppositifolius B.L.Rob; Baclea oppositifolia (B.L.Rob.) Greene

Genus of plants

Pseudonemacladus is a genus of plants in the Campanulaceae. It contains only one known species, Pseudonemacladus oppositifolius, native to north-eastern Mexico (States of San Luis Potosí and Hidalgo).
