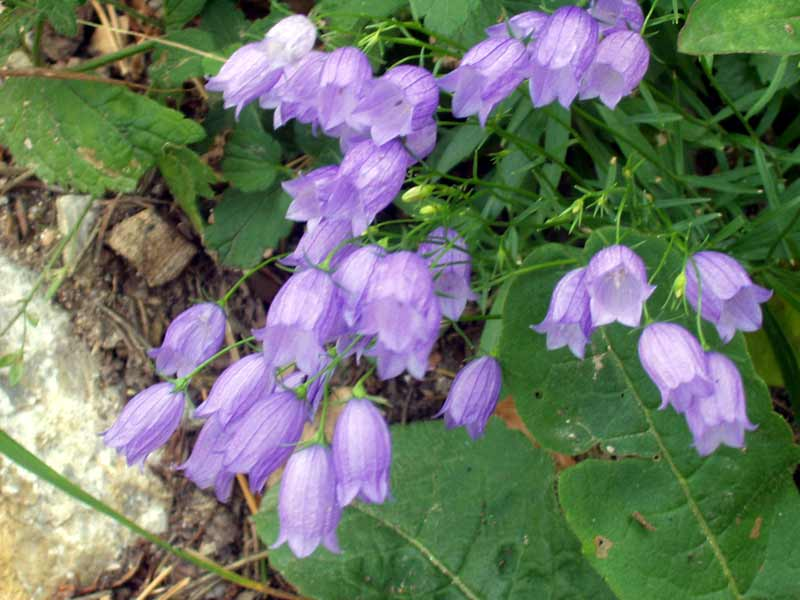
- Campanula cespitosa

Scientific classification
- Kingdom: Plantae
- Clade: Embryophytes
- Clade: Tracheophytes
- Clade: Spermatophytes
- Clade: Angiosperms
- Clade: Eudicots
- Clade: Asterids
- Order: Asterales
- Family: Campanulaceae; Juss.

Genera
- See text

= Campanulaceae =

Family of flowering plants comprising bellflowers

The family Campanulaceae (also bellflower family), of the order Asterales, contains nearly 2400 species in 84 genera of herbaceous plants, shrubs, and rarely small trees, often with milky sap. Among them are several familiar garden plants belonging to the genera Campanula (bellflower), Lobelia, and Platycodon (balloonflower). Campanula rapunculus (rampion or r. bellflower) and Codonopsis lanceolata are eaten as vegetables. Lobelia inflata (indian tobacco), L. siphilitica and L. tupa (devil's tobacco) and others have been used as medicinal plants. Campanula rapunculoides (creeping bellflower) may be a troublesome weed, particularly in gardens, while Legousia spp. may occur in arable fields.

Most current classifications include the segregate family Lobeliaceae in Campanulaceae as subfamily Lobelioideae. A third subfamily, Cyphioideae, includes the genus Cyphia, and sometimes also the genera Cyphocarpus, Nemacladus, Parishella and Pseudonemacladus. Alternatively, the last three genera are placed in Nemacladoideae, while Cyphocarpus is placed in its own subfamily, Cyphocarpoideae.

This family is almost cosmopolitan, occurring on all continents except Antarctica. In addition, species of the family are native to many remote oceanic islands and archipelagos. Hawaii is particularly rich, with well over 100 endemic species of Hawaiian lobelioids. Continental areas with high diversity are South Africa, California and the northern Andes.

Habitats range from extreme deserts to rainforests and lakes, from the tropics to the high Arctic (Melanocalyx uniflora), and from sea cliffs to high alpine habitats.

== Description ==
Although most Campanulaceae are perennial herbs (sometimes climbing, as in Codonopsis), there is also a large number of annuals e.g. species of Legousia. Isotoma hypocrateriformis is a succulent annual from Australia's dry interior. There are also biennials, e.g. the commonly cultivated ornamental Campanula medium (Canterbury bells). Many perennial campanuloids grow in rock-crevices, such as Musschia aurea (Madeira) and Petromarula pinnata (Crete). Some lobelioids also grow on rocks, e.g. the peculiar perennial stem succulent Brighamia rockii in Hawaii. Insular and tropical montane species in particular are often more or less woody and may bear the leaves in a dense rosette. When, in addition, the plant is unbranched, the result may be a palm- or treefern-like habit, as in species of the Hawaiian genus Cyanea, which comprises the tallest of Campanulaceae, C. leptostegia (up to 14 m). Lysipomia are minute cushion plants of the high Andes, while giant rosette-forming lobelias (e.g., Lobelia deckenii) are a characteristic component of the vegetation in the alpine zone on the tropical African volcanoes. In the Himalaya Campanula modesta and Cyananthus microphyllus reach even higher, probably setting the elevational record for the family at 4800 m. Several species are associated with freshwater, such as Lobelia dortmanna, an isoetid common in oligotrophic lakes in the boreal zone of North America and Europe, and Howellia aquatilis, an elodeid growing in ponds in SW North America.

There is usually abundant, white latex, but occasionally the exudate is clear and/or very sparse, as in Jasione.

Tubers occur in several genera, e.g. Cyphia.

Leaves are often alternate, more rarely opposite (e. g. Codonopsis) or whorled (Ostrowskia). They are simple (Petromarula one of very few exceptions) entire (repeatedly divided in spp. of Cyanea), but often with dentate margin. Stipules are absent.

Inflorescences are quite diverse, including both cymose and racemose types. In Jasione they are strongly condensed and resemble asteraceous capitula. In a few species, e. g. Cyananthus lobatus, flowers are solitary.

Flowers are bisexual (dioecious in Dialypetalum) and protandrous. Petals are fused into a corolla with 3 to 8 lobes. It may be bell- or star-shaped in subfamily Campanuloideae, while tubular and bilaterally symmetric in most Lobelioideae. Blue of various shades is the most common petal colour, but purple, red, pink, orange, yellow, white, and green also occur. The corolla may be down to 1 mm wide and long in some species of Wahlenbergia. At the other extreme, it reaches a width of 15 cm in Ostrowskia.

Stamens are equal in number to, and alternating with the petals. Anthers may be fused into a tube, as in all species of Lobelioideae and some Campanuloideae (e.g. Symphyandra)

Within the family pollen grains are often tricolporate, less commonly triporate, tricolpate, or pantoporate.

Carpel number is usually 2, 3 or 5 (8 in Ostrowskia), and corresponds to the number of stigmatic lobes.

The style is in various ways involved in the "presentation" of the pollen, as in several other families of the order Asterales. In Lobelioideae, pollen is, already in the bud stage, released into the tube formed by the anthers. During flowering, it is pushed up by the elongating style and "presented" to visiting pollinators at the apex of the tube, a mechanism described as a pollen pump. The style eventually protrudes through the anther tube, and becomes receptive to pollen. In Campanuloideae, the pollen is instead packed between hairs on the style, gradually being released as the hairs invaginate. Subsequently, the stigmatic lobes unfold, and become receptive.

Bees and birds (particularly hummingbirds and hawaiian honeycreepers) are probably the most common pollinators of Campanulaceae. A few confirmed and many probable cases of bat-pollination are known, particularly in the genus Burmeistera. Brighamia and Hippobroma have pale or white flowers with a long-tubed corolla, and are pollinated by hawkmoths. Pollination by lizards has been reported for Musschia aurea and Nesocodon mauritianus.

The ovary is usually inferior or, in some species, semi-inferior. Very rarely is it completely superior (e.g. Cyananthus). In Campanumoea javanica, calyx and corolla diverge from the ovary at different levels.

Berries are a common fruit-type in Lobelioideae (Burmeistera, Clermontia, Centropogon, Cyanea etc.), whilst rare in Campanuloideae (Canarina being one of few examples). Capsules, with very varying modes of dehiscence, are otherwise the predominating fruit type in the family.

Seeds are mostly small (<2 mm) and numerous.

== Subfamilies and genera ==
95 genera are accepted. The Angiosperm Phylogeny Website divides the family into five subfamilies.

Campanuloideae

- Adenophora Fisch – Europe and Asia
- Asyneuma Griseb. & Schenk – southern Europe and Asia
- Berenice Tul. – Réunion
- Campanula L. (synonyms Azorina Feer and Theodorovia Kolak.) – mostly northern hemisphere
- Campanulastrum Small
- Canarina L. – Canary Islands and East Africa
- Codonopsis Wall. – eastern Asia
- Craterocapsa Hilliard & B.L.Burtt – South Africa
- Cryptocodon Fed. – C Asia
- Cyananthus Wall. ex Benth. – E Asia
- Cyclocodon Griff. ex Hook.f. & Thomson – tropical and subtropical Asia and New Guinea
- Cylindrocarpa Regel – Central Asia
- Eastwoodiella Morin – California
- Echinocodon D.Y.Hong – China
- Edraianthus A.DC. – SE Europe and W Asia
- Favratia Feer – Alps
- Feeria Buser – Morocco
- × Fockeanthus H.R.Wehrh. – central Europe
- Githopsis Nutt. – W N America
- Gunillaea Thulin – Tropical Africa and Madagascar
- Hanabusaya Nakai – Korea
- Heterochaenia A.DC. – Réunion
- Heterocodon Nutt. – SW N America
- Himalacodon D.Y.Hong & Qiang Wang – Himalayas
- Homocodon D.Y.Hong – China
- Jasione L. – Europe and SW Asia
- Kericodon Cupido – Cape Provinces
- Legousia Durande – Europe and N Africa
- Melanocalyx (Fed.) Morin – subarctic Eurasia and North America and Rocky Mountains
- Merciera A.DC. – South Africa
- Michauxia L'Hér. – Middle East
- Microcodon A.DC. – South Africa
- Muehlbergella Feer
- Musschia Dumort. – Madeira
- Namacodon Thulin – southwestern Africa
- Nesocodon Thulin – Mauritius
- Ostrowskia Regel – Central Asia
- Palustricodon Morin – central and eastern North America
- Pankycodon D.Y.Hong & X.T.Ma – Himalayas
- Peracarpa Hook.f. & Thomson – Southeast Asia
- Petromarula Vent. ex R.Hedw. – Crete
- Physoplexis Schur – Alps
- Phyteuma L. – Europe and Asia
- Platycodon A.DC. – eastern Asia
- Poolea Morin – Texas
- Prismatocarpus L'Hér. – Southern Africa
- Protocodon Morin – Florida
- Pseudocodon D.Y.Hong & H.Sun
- Ravenella Morin – California
- Rhigiophyllum Hochst. – South Africa
- Roella L. – South Africa
- Rotanthella Morin – Florida
- Sergia Fed. – C Asia
- Siphocodon Turcz.- South Africa
- Smithiastrum Morin – California and Oregon
- Theilera E.Phillips – South Africa
- Trachelium Tourn. ex L. – SE Europe, Middle East and C Asia
- Treichelia Vatke – South Africa
- Triodanis Raf. – Americas and southern Europe
- Wahlenbergia Serra, M.B.Crespo & Lammers (synonym Hesperocodon Eddie & Cupido) – mostly Southern Hemisphere
- Zeugandra P.H.Davis – Iran

Lobelioideae

- Brighamia A.Gray – Hawaii
- Burmeistera H.Karst. & Triana – N Andes and C America
- Centropogon C.Presl. – Neotropics
- Clermontia Gaudich. – Hawaii
- Cyanea Gaudich. – Hawaii
- Delissea Gaudich. – Hawaii
- Dialypetalum Benth. – Madagascar
- Diastatea Scheidw. – Neotropics
- Dielsantha E.Wimm. – Tropical Africa
- Downingia Torr. – W N America and S S America
- Grammatotheca C.Presl. – South Africa
- Heterotoma Zucc. – Mexico
- Hippobroma G.Don – W Indies
- Howellia A.Gray – SW N America
- Isotoma (R.Br.) Lindl. – Australia
- Legenere McVaugh – California
- Lithotoma E.B.Knox – Australia
- Lobelia Plum. ex L. (synonyms include Hypsela, Laurentia, Pratia) – cosmopolitan
- Lysipomia Kunth – Andes
- Monopsis Salisb. – tropical and southern Africa and Comoros
- Palmerella A.Gray – California
- Porterella Torr. – SW N America
- Ruthiella Steenis – New Guinea
- Sclerotheca A.DC. (synonym Apetahia Baill.) – Society Islands
- Siphocampylus Pohl – Neotropics
- Solenopsis C.Presl – S Europe and N Africa
- Trematolobelia Zahlbr. ex Rock – Hawaii
- Trimeris C.Presl – subtropical southern hemisphere
- Unigenes E.Wimm. – South Africa
- Wimmeranthus Rzed. – southwestern Mexico
- Wimmerella Serra, M.B.Crespo & Lammers – South Africa

Cyphioideae

- Cyphia P.J.Bergius – Africa

Cyphocarpoideae

- Cyphocarpus Miers – northern Chile

Nemacladoideae

- Nemacladus Nutt. (syn. Parishella) – SW N America
- Pseudonemacladus McVaugh – Mexico

== Fossil record ==
The earliest known occurrence of Campanulaceae pollen is from Oligocene strata. Earliest Campanulaceae macrofossils dated, are seeds of †Campanula paleopyramidalis from 17–16 million years old Miocene deposits in the Nowy Sacz, Carpathians, Poland. It is a close relative of the extant Campanula pyramidalis.

== Chemical compounds ==
Members of subfamily Lobelioideae contain the alkaloid lobeline. The principal storage carbohydrate of Campanulaceae is inulin, a fructan also occurring in the related family Asteraceae.

== Literature ==
- Lammers, T.G. (2007). World Checklist and Bibliography of Campanulaceae. Richmond, Surrey, United Kingdom: Royal Botanical Gardens, Kew.
- Fedorov, A.; Kovanda, M. (1976). "Campanulaceae". In T.G. Tutin; V.H. Heywood; N.A. Burges; D.M. Moore; D.H. Valentine; S.M. Walters; D.A. Webb (eds.). Flora Europaea. Cambridge University Press. pp. 74–93.
- Borsch, T.; Korotkova, N.; Raus, T.; Lobin, W.; Loehne, C. (2009). "The petD group II intron as a genus and species level marker: Utility for tree inference and species identification in the diverse genus Campanula (Campanulaceae)". Willdenowia. 39: 7–33. doi:10.3372/wi.39.39101.
- Roquet, C.; Sáez, L.; Aldasoro, J. J.; Alfonso, S.; Alarcón, M. L.; Garcia-Jacas, N. (2008). "Natural delineation, molecular phylogeny and floral evolution in Campanula". Systematic Botany. 33: 203–217. doi:10.1600/036364408783887465. S2CID 86780466.
- Cosner, M. E.; Raubeson, L. A.; Jansen, R. K. (2007). "Chloroplast DNA rearrangements in Campanulaceae: phylogenetic utility of highly rearranged genomes". BMC Evolutionary Biology. 4 (27): 1–17. doi:10.1186/1471-2148-4-27. PMC 516026. PMID 15324459.
- Eddie, W. M. M.; Shulkina, T.; Gaskin, J.; Haberle, R. C.; Jansen, R. K. (2003). "Phylogeny of Campanulaceae s. str. inferred from ITS sequences of nuclear ribosomal DNA". Annals of the Missouri Botanical Garden. 90 (4): 554–575. doi:10.2307/3298542. JSTOR 3298542.
