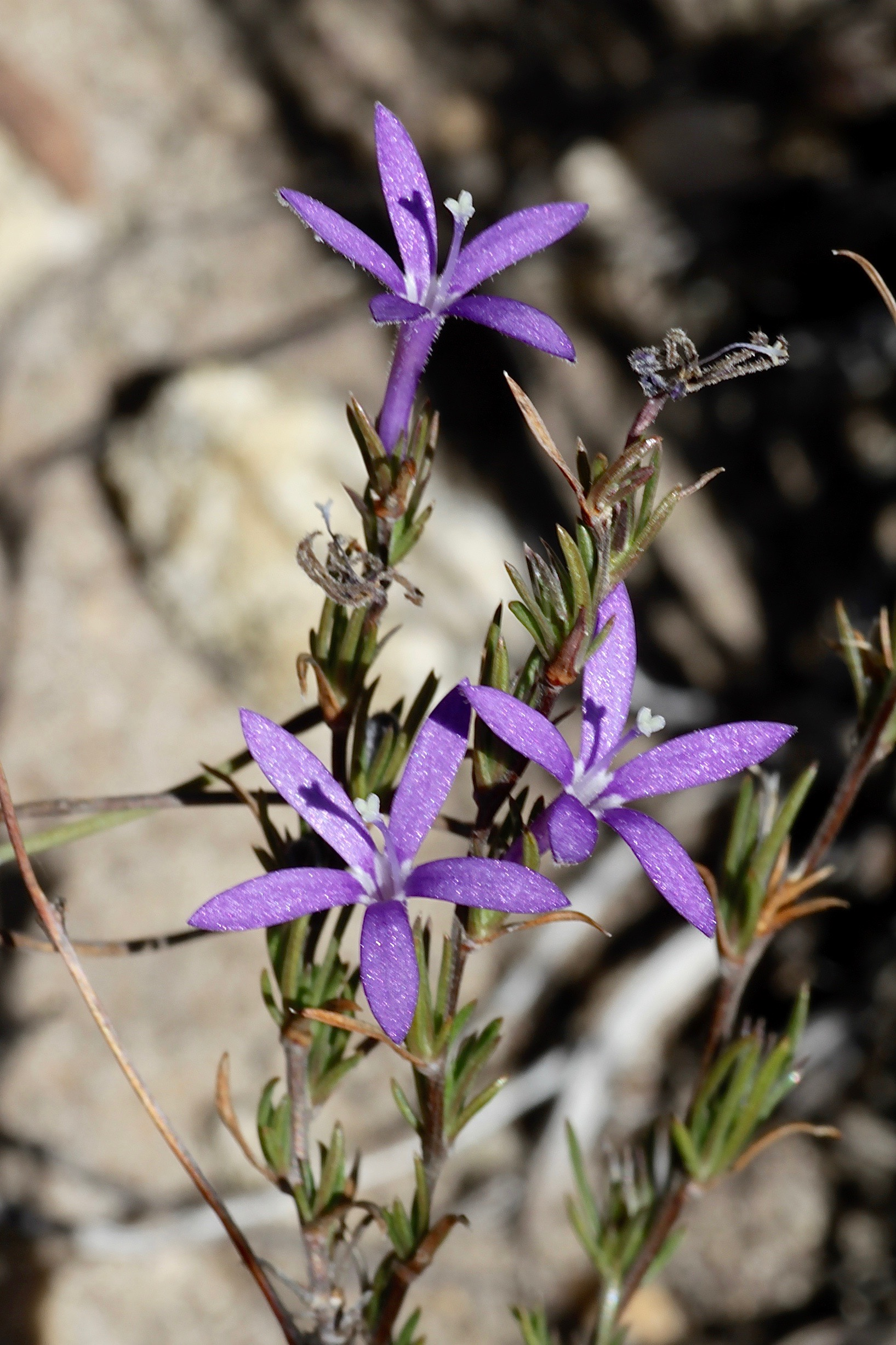
- Theilera guthriei

Scientific classification
- Kingdom: Plantae
- Clade: Tracheophytes
- Clade: Angiosperms
- Clade: Eudicots
- Clade: Asterids
- Order: Asterales
- Family: Campanulaceae
- Subfamily: Campanuloideae
- Genus: Theilera; E.Phillips

Type species
- Theilera guthriei (L.Bolus) E.Phillips

= Theilera =

Genus of plants

Theilera is a genus of plants in the Campanulaceae. It contains two known species, both endemic to Cape Province of South Africa.

- Theilera guthriei (L.Bolus) E.Phillips 1926
- Theilera robusta (A.DC.) Cupido 2009
