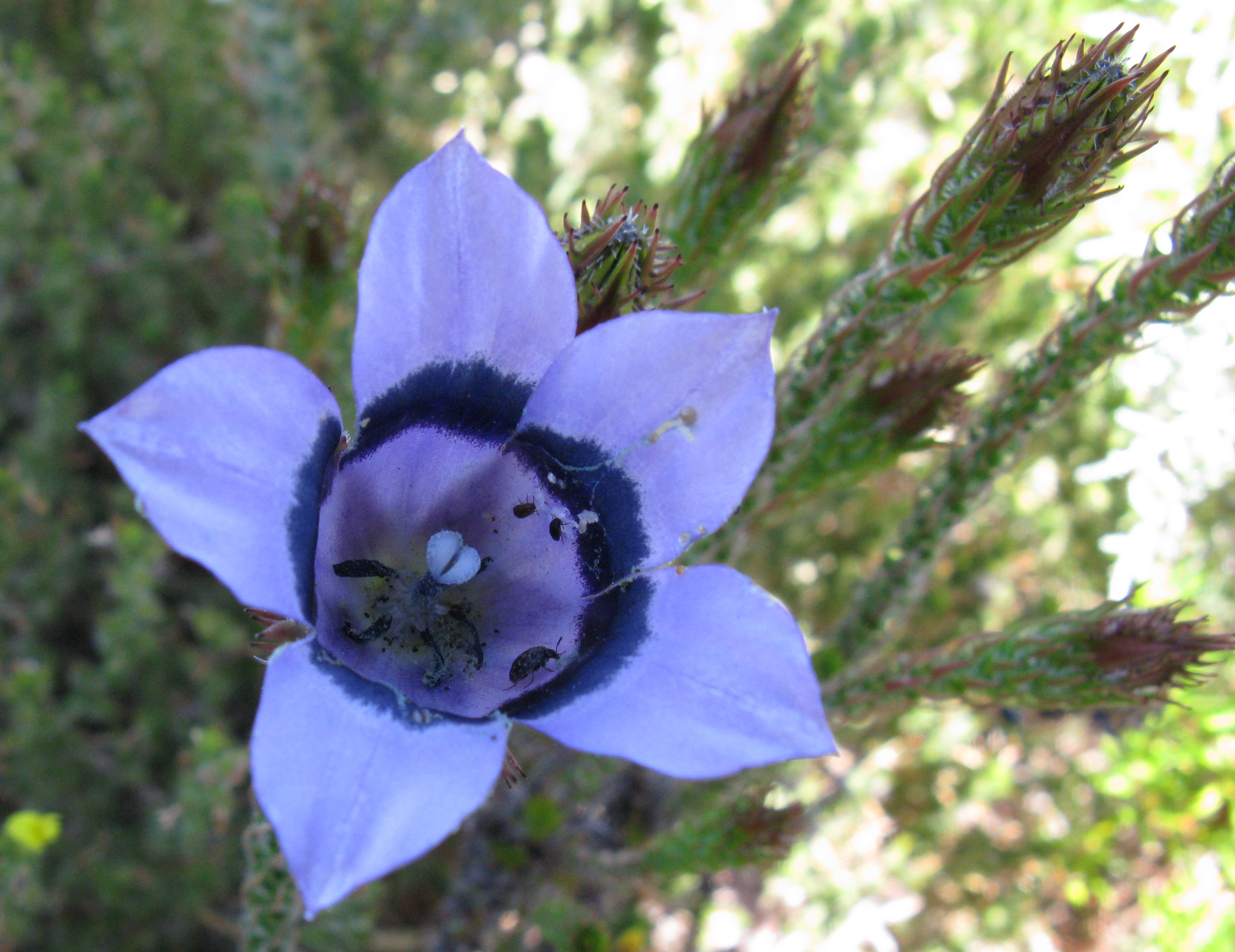
- Roella ciliata flower and leaves

Scientific classification
- Kingdom: Plantae
- Clade: Tracheophytes
- Clade: Angiosperms
- Clade: Eudicots
- Clade: Asterids
- Order: Asterales
- Family: Campanulaceae
- Subfamily: Campanuloideae
- Genus: Roella; L. (1753)

Species
- See text

= Roella =

Genus of flowering plants

Roella is a genus of flowering plants in the family Campanulaceae, native to southern South Africa. They are small shrubs or perennial herbs and can be erect through prostrate in habit.

== Species ==
Currently accepted species include:

- Roella amplexicaulis Dod
- Roella arenaria Schltr.
- Roella bryoides H.Buek
- Roella ciliata L.
- Roella compacta Schltr.
- Roella decurrens L'Hér.
- Roella divina Cupido
- Roella dregeana A.DC.
- Roella dunantii A.DC.
- Roella glomerata A.DC.
- Roella goodiana Adamson
- Roella incurva Banks ex A.DC.
- Roella latiloba A.DC.
- Roella maculata Adamson
- Roella muscosa L.f.
- Roella prostrata E.Mey. ex A.DC.
- Roella recurvata A.DC.
- Roella secunda H.Buek
- Roella spicata L.f.
- Roella squarrosa P.J.Bergius
- Roella triflora (R.D.Good) Adamson
- Roella uncinata Cupido
