= Dialypetalum =

Scientific classification
- Kingdom: Plantae
- Clade: Tracheophytes
- Clade: Angiosperms
- Clade: Eudicots
- Clade: Asterids
- Order: Asterales
- Family: Campanulaceae
- Subfamily: Lobelioideae
- Genus: Dialypetalum; Benth. in G.Bentham & J.D.Hooker

Type species
- Dialypetalum floribundum Benth.

Genus of flowering plants

Dialypetalum is a genus of plants endemic to Madagascar. It differs from other Lobelioideae in that it has regular (actinomorphic) flowers with virtually free petals, and is dioecious. It contains the following species, accepted as of July 2014:

- Dialypetalum compactum Zahlbr.
- Dialypetalum floribundum Benth. in G.Bentham & J.D.Hooker
- Dialypetalum humbertianum E.Wimm. in H.G.A.Engler
- Dialypetalum × hybridum E.Wimm. in H.G.A.Engler (D. compactum × D. floribundum)
- Dialypetalum montanum E.Wimm. in H.G.A.Engler
- Dialypetalum stenopetalum E.Wimm. in H.G.A.Engler
