= Kericodon =

Scientific classification
- Kingdom: Plantae
- Clade: Tracheophytes
- Clade: Angiosperms
- Clade: Eudicots
- Clade: Asterids
- Order: Asterales
- Family: Campanulaceae
- Subfamily: Campanuloideae
- Genus: Kericodon; Cupido
- Species: K. crispus

Binomial name
- Kericodon crispus (L'Hér.) Cupido

Synonyms
- Campanula crispa Banks ex A.DC.; Campanula longirostris Banks ex D.Dietr., nom. superfl.; Campanula plicata Pers.; Prismatocarpus crispus L'Hér.; Prismatocarpus hildebrandtii Vatke

Genus of flowering plants

Kericodon is a genus of flowering plants in the family Campanulaceae. It contains a single species, Kericodon crispus, an annual endemic to the Cape Provinces of South Africa.
