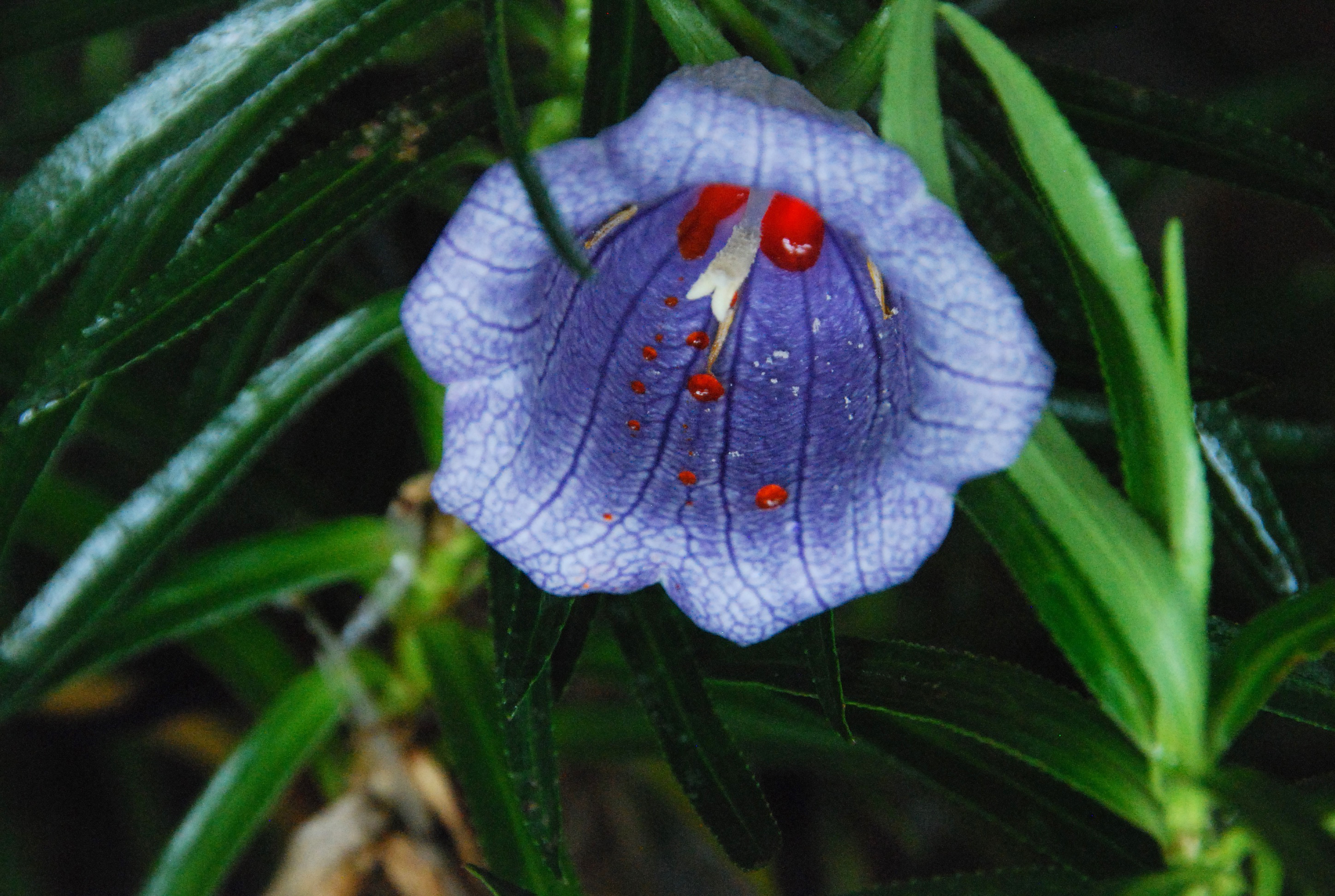
- Nesocodon mauritianus at the Conservatoire botanique national de Brest, France in 2015 july

Scientific classification
- Kingdom: Plantae
- Clade: Embryophytes
- Clade: Tracheophytes
- Clade: Spermatophytes
- Clade: Angiosperms
- Clade: Eudicots
- Clade: Asterids
- Order: Asterales
- Family: Campanulaceae
- Subfamily: Campanuloideae
- Genus: Nesocodon; Thulin
- Species: N. mauritianus

Binomial name
- Nesocodon mauritianus (I.B.K.Richardson) Thulin
- It is endemic to Mauritius

Synonyms
- Wahlenbergia mauritiana I.Richardson

= Nesocodon =

Genus of flowering plants

Nesocodon is a monotypic genus of flowering plants within the family Campanulaceae. The sole species is Nesocodon mauritianus, formerly known as Wahlenbergia mauritiana, which is endemic to the island of Mauritius.

== Description ==
=== Vegetative characteristics ===
Nesocodon mauritianus is a 30–40 cm big dwarf shrub with simple, woody, straggly, glabrous stems bearing deep furrows from leaf scars. The spirally arranged, glossy, lanceolate leaves with a serrate margin and an acute apex are 6 cm long, and 0.6 cm wide.

=== Generative characteristics ===
The lateral, 1-flowered inflorescence is produced in the leaf axils of the upper leaves.

== Taxonomy ==
It was first described as Wahlenbergia mauritiana I.Richardson by I.Richardson in 1979. It was placed into a new monotypic genus Nesocodon Thulin as Nesocodon mauritianus (I.Richardson) Thulin by Mats Thulin in 1980. It is closely related to Heterochaenia from the Mascarene Islands, but has single flowers rather than panicles of several.

== Ecology ==
It was the first plant ever discovered to produce red-colored nectar. It was originally thought to have been pollinated by birds, however, recent investigations have demonstrated that day geckos (Phelsuma ornata) are the preferred pollinator of these flowers whereas birds function as nectar thieves. The introduced red-whiskered bulbul (Pycnonotus jocosus) robs it of its nectar.

== Conservation ==
It is a threatened species.
