= Feeria =

Scientific classification
- Kingdom: Plantae
- Clade: Tracheophytes
- Clade: Angiosperms
- Clade: Eudicots
- Clade: Asterids
- Order: Asterales
- Family: Campanulaceae
- Subfamily: Campanuloideae
- Genus: Feeria; Buser
- Species: F. angustifolia

Binomial name
- Feeria angustifolia (Schousb.) Buser

Synonyms
- Trachelium angustifolium Schousb.

Genus of flowering plants

Feeria is a genus of plants in the family Campanulaceae. There is only one known species, Feeria angustifolia, endemic to Morocco.
