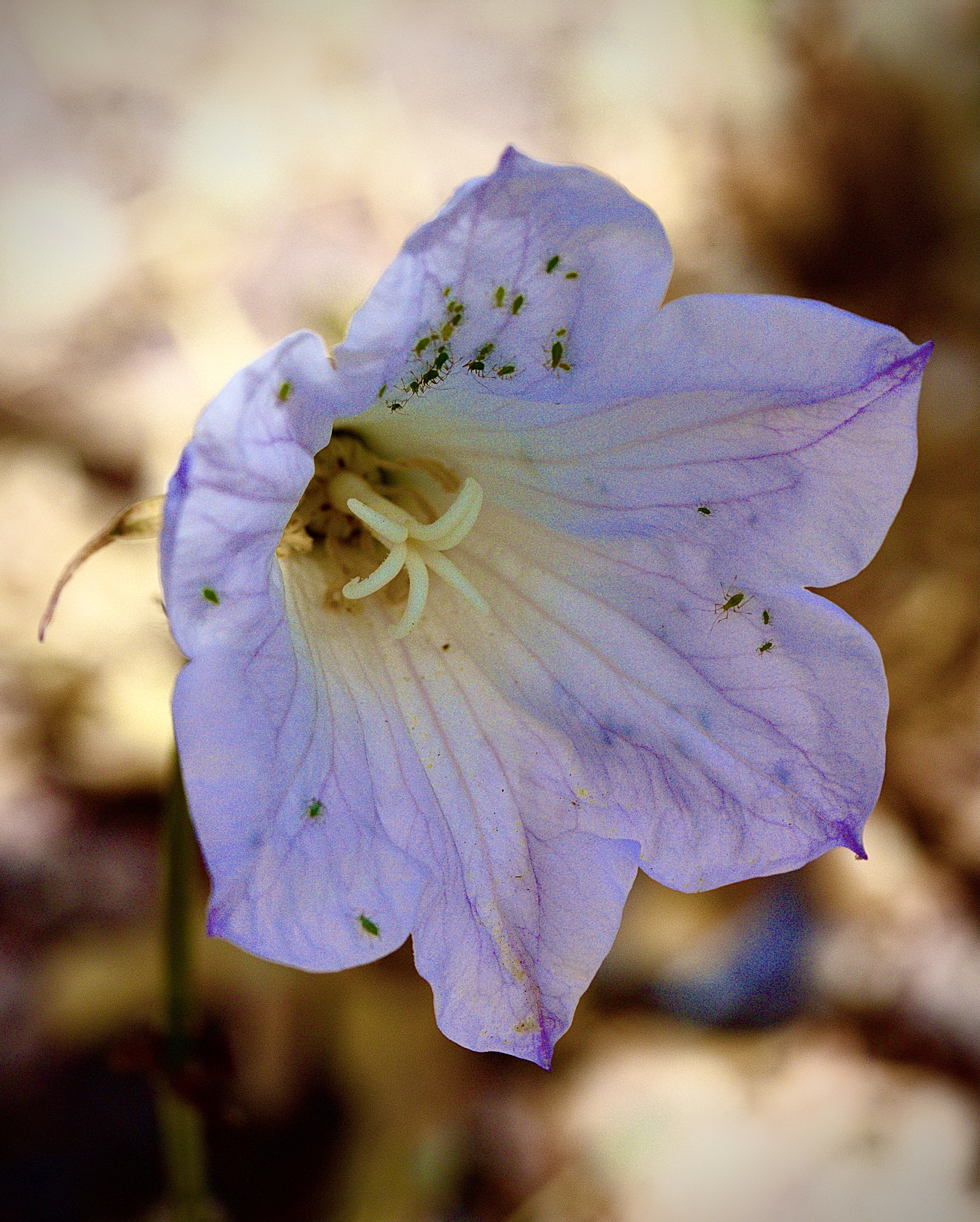

Scientific classification
- Kingdom: Plantae
- Clade: Tracheophytes
- Clade: Angiosperms
- Clade: Eudicots
- Clade: Asterids
- Order: Asterales
- Family: Campanulaceae
- Subfamily: Campanuloideae
- Genus: Ostrowskia; Regel
- Species: O. magnifica

Binomial name
- Ostrowskia magnifica Regel

= Ostrowskia =

Species of plant

Ostrowskia is a genus of plants in the family Campanulaceae. There is only one known species, Ostrowskia magnifica, native to the Central Asian nations of Afghanistan, Kyrgyzstan and Tajikistan.

== Gallery ==
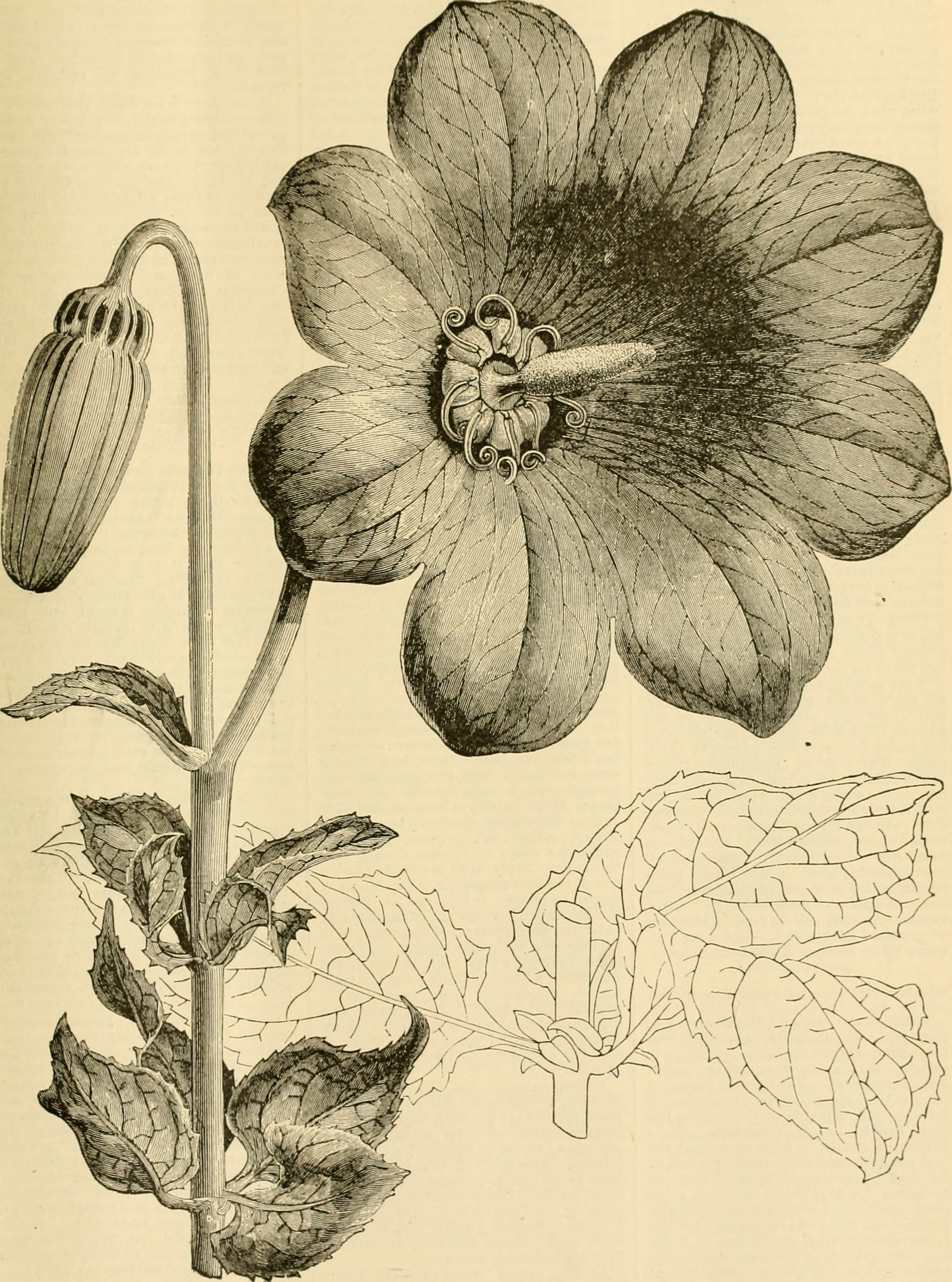
Uncoloured botanical plate from The American florist (1888)
