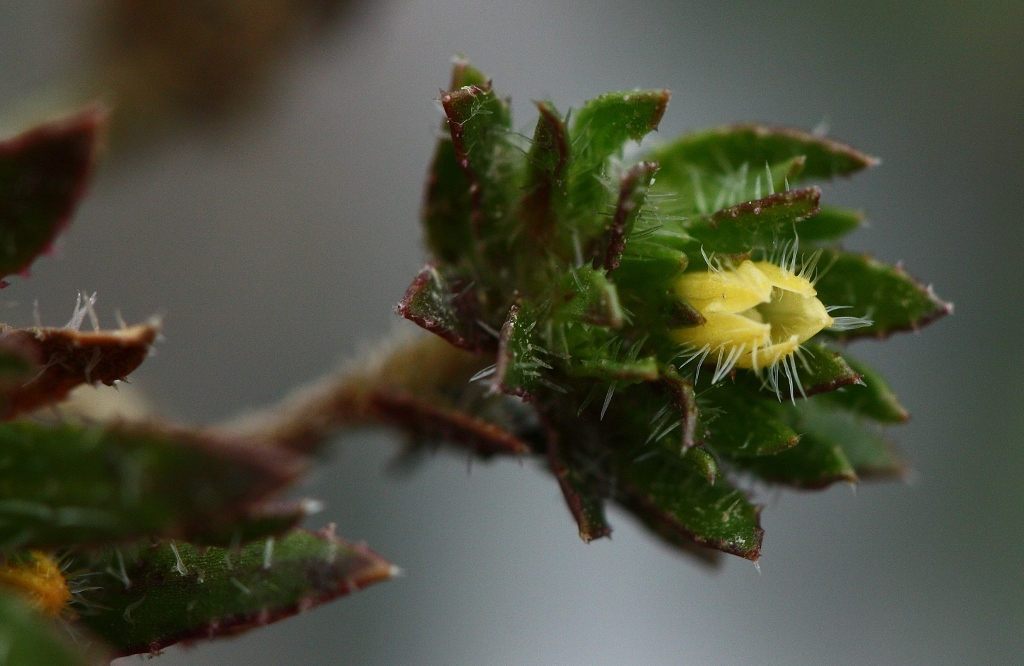
- Treichelia dodii

Scientific classification
- Kingdom: Plantae
- Clade: Tracheophytes
- Clade: Angiosperms
- Clade: Eudicots
- Clade: Asterids
- Order: Asterales
- Family: Campanulaceae
- Subfamily: Campanuloideae
- Genus: Treichelia; Vatke

Type species
- Treichelia longibracteata (H.Buek) Vatke

Synonyms
- Leptocodon Sond. (1865), nom. illeg.

= Treichelia =

Genus of flowering plants

Treichelia is a genus of plants in the Campanulaceae. It contains two known species, both endemic to Cape Provinces of South Africa.

- Treichelia dodii Cupido
- Treichelia longibracteata (H.Buek) Vatke
