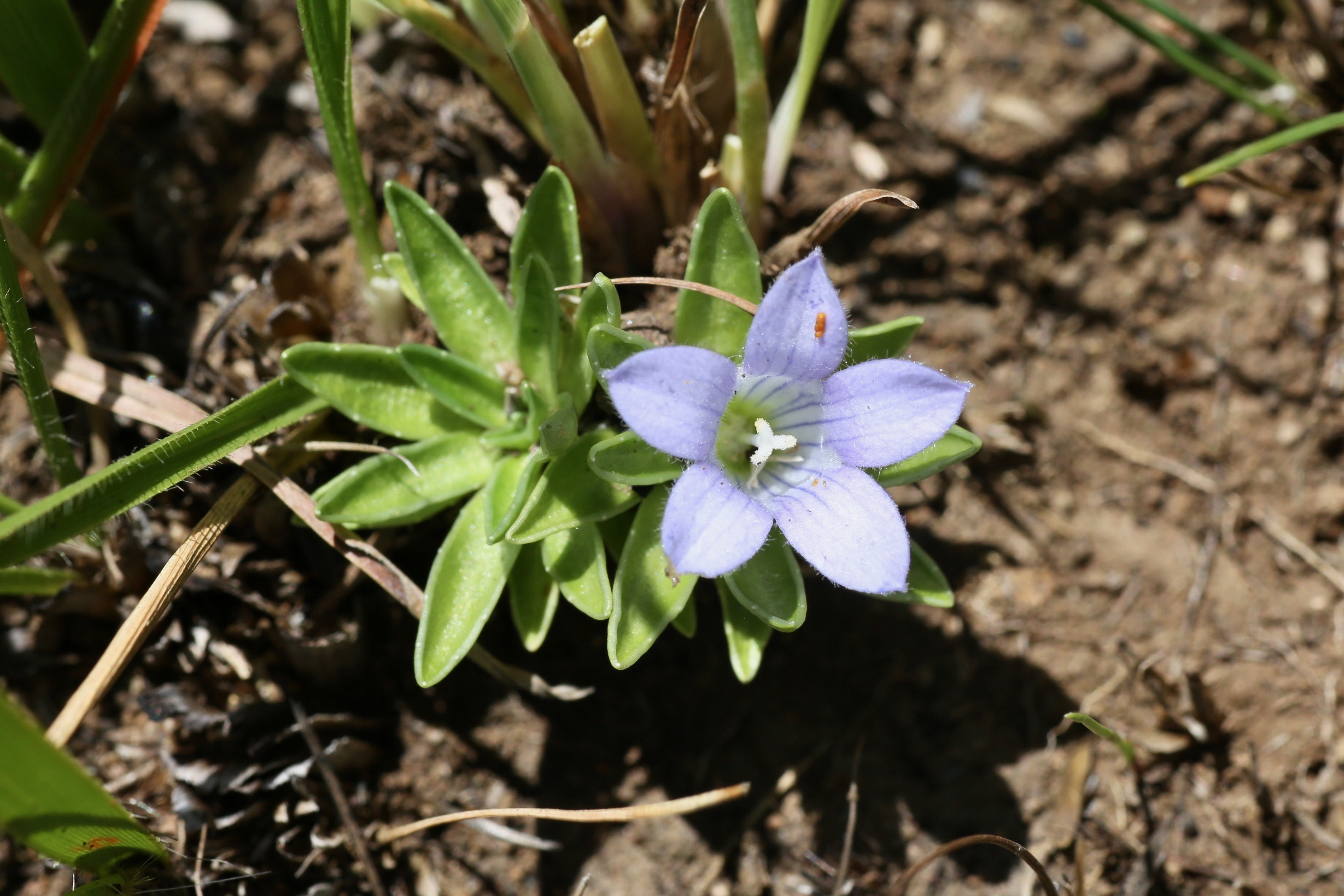
- Craterocapsa tarsodes South Africa, Giants Castle Game Reserve

Scientific classification
- Kingdom: Plantae
- Clade: Tracheophytes
- Clade: Angiosperms
- Clade: Eudicots
- Clade: Asterids
- Order: Asterales
- Family: Campanulaceae
- Subfamily: Campanuloideae
- Genus: Craterocapsa; Hilliard & B.L.Burtt

= Craterocapsa =

Genus of flowering plants

Craterocapsa is a genus of plants in the family Campanulaceae. It contains 5 known species, all native to southern Africa.

- Craterocapsa alfredica D.Y.Hong - KwaZulu-Natal
- Craterocapsa congesta Hilliard & B.L.Burtt - Lesotho, South Africa
- Craterocapsa insizwae (Zahlbr.) Hilliard & B.L.Burtt - South Africa
- Craterocapsa montana (A.DC.) Hilliard & B.L.Burtt - Lesotho, South Africa
- Craterocapsa tarsodes Hilliard & B.L.Burtt - Eswatini, Zimbabwe, Lesotho, South Africa
