= Pankycodon =

Scientific classification
- Kingdom: Plantae
- Clade: Tracheophytes
- Clade: Angiosperms
- Clade: Eudicots
- Clade: Asterids
- Order: Asterales
- Family: Campanulaceae
- Genus: Pankycodon; D.Y.Hong & X.T.Ma
- Species: P. purpureus

Binomial name
- Pankycodon purpureus (Wall.) D.Y.Hong & X.T.Ma

Synonyms
- Campanula purpurea (Wall.) Spreng.; Codonopsis purpurea Wall. (1824) (basionym); Glosocomia purpurea (Wall.) Rupr.; Wahlenbergia purpurea (Wall.) A.DC.

Genus of flowering plants

Pankycodon is a genus of flowering plants in the family Campanulaceae. It includes a single species, Pankycodon purpureus, a perennial native to the Himalayas and western Yunnan.

Pankycodon is named after botanist Pan Kai-Yu (1937-), who is the wife of Prof. Hong De-Yuan, one of the authors of the article that introduced by the genus.
