= Gunillaea =

Scientific classification
- Kingdom: Plantae
- Clade: Tracheophytes
- Clade: Angiosperms
- Clade: Eudicots
- Clade: Asterids
- Order: Asterales
- Family: Campanulaceae
- Subfamily: Campanuloideae
- Genus: Gunillaea; Thulin

Genus of flowering plants

Gunillaea is a genus of plants in the family Campanulaceae. It contains two known species, both native to tropical and southern Africa and Madagascar.

- Gunillaea emirnensis (A.DC.) Thulin - Madagascar, Zaire, Tanzania, Angola, Malawi, Zambia, Zimbabwe
- Gunillaea rhodesica (Adamson) Thulin - Zaire, Angola, Mozambique, Zambia, Zimbabwe, Botswana, Namibia, Caprivi
