= Poolea =

Scientific classification
- Kingdom: Plantae
- Clade: Tracheophytes
- Clade: Angiosperms
- Clade: Eudicots
- Clade: Asterids
- Order: Asterales
- Family: Campanulaceae
- Genus: Poolea; Morin
- Species: P. reverchonii

Binomial name
- Poolea reverchonii (A.Gray) Morin

Synonyms
- Campanula reverchonii A.Gray

Genus of flowering plants

Poolea is a genus of flowering plants in the family Campanulaceae. It includes a single species, Poolea reverchonii, an annual endemic to central Texas.
