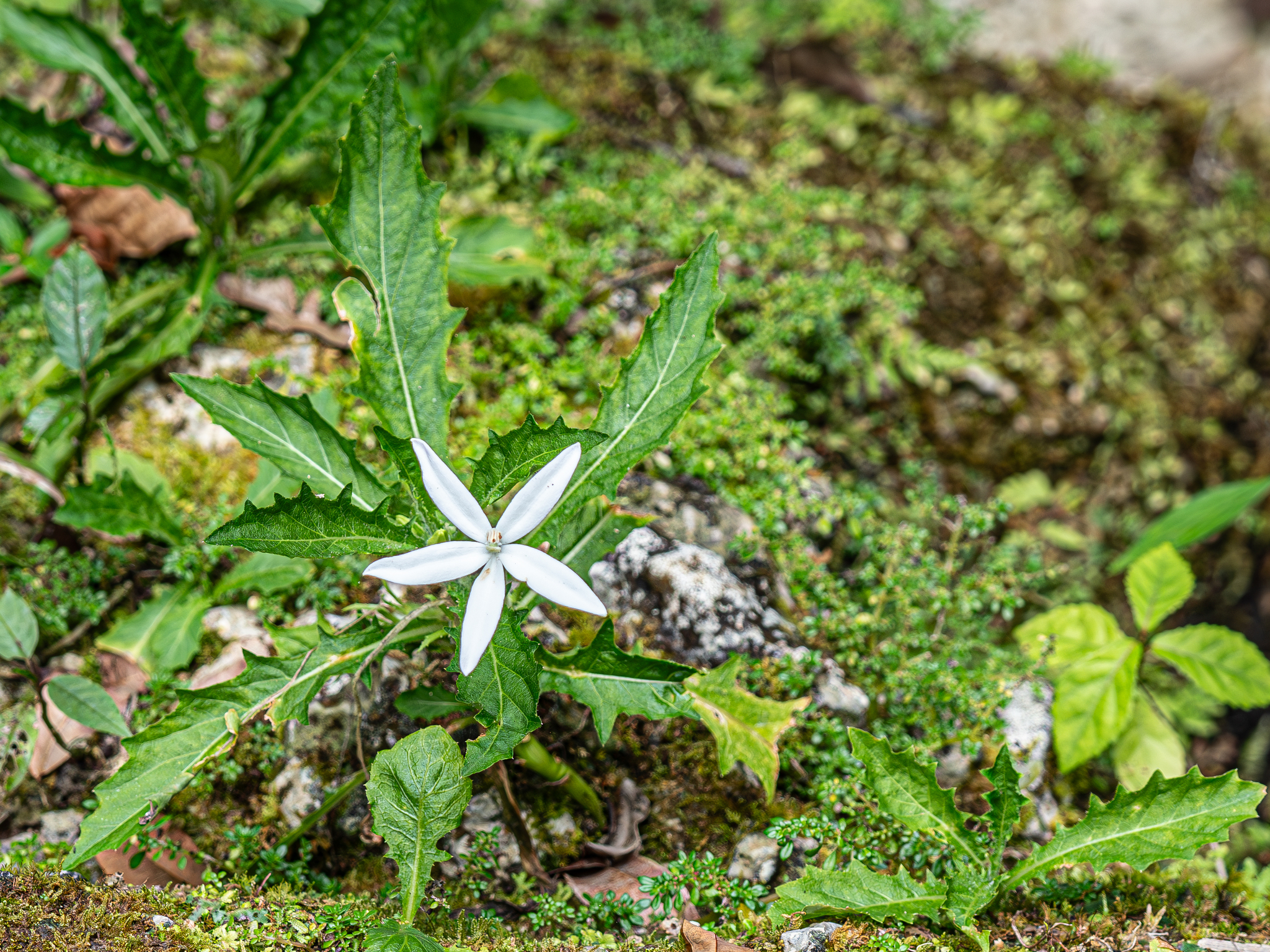
- Hippobroma longiflora in Portland Parish, Jamaica

Scientific classification
- Kingdom: Plantae
- Clade: Tracheophytes
- Clade: Angiosperms
- Clade: Eudicots
- Clade: Asterids
- Order: Asterales
- Family: Campanulaceae
- Subfamily: Lobelioideae
- Genus: Hippobroma; G.Don
- Species: H. longiflora

Binomial name
- Hippobroma longiflora (L.) G.Don
- Its native range is Jamaica, but it has been introduced throughout the tropical regions of the world

Synonyms
- Lobelia longiflora L. (basionym); Isotoma longiflora (L.) C.Presl; Laurentia longiflora (L.) Peterm.; Rapuntium longiflorum (L.) Mill.; Solenopsis longiflora (L.) M.R.Almeida; Isotoma longiflora var. runcinata (Hassk.) Panigrahi, P.Daniel & M.V.Viswan.; Isotoma runcinata Hassk.; Laurentia longiflora var. runcinata (Hassk.) E.Wimm.

= Hippobroma =

Genus of plants

Hippobroma longiflora, also called Star of Bethlehem or madamfate, is a flowering plant in the family Campanulaceae. It is the only species in the genus Hippobroma. It is endemic to Jamaica in the West Indies, but has become naturalised across the American tropics, Madagascar, southern and southeastern Asia, and Oceania.

It is a perennial herbaceous plant growing to 35 cm tall, with leaves 7–16 cm long and 1–3.7 cm broad, with a coarsely toothed margin. The five-petaled white flower has a slender floral tube only 2 or 3 mm (0.1 or 0.1 in) wide by 7 to 8 cm (2.8 to 3.1 in) in length. The plant contains two pyridine alkaloids, lobeline and nicotine. The effects of nicotine and lobeline are quite similar, with psychoactive effects at small dosages and with unpleasant effects including vomiting, muscle paralysis, and trembling at higher dosages. For this reason, H. longiflora (and its various synonyms) is often referenced for both its toxicity and its ethnobotanical uses.
