= Namacodon =

Conservation status
- Least Concern (IUCN 3.1)

Scientific classification
- Kingdom: Plantae
- Clade: Tracheophytes
- Clade: Angiosperms
- Clade: Eudicots
- Clade: Asterids
- Order: Asterales
- Family: Campanulaceae
- Subfamily: Campanuloideae
- Genus: Namacodon; Thulin
- Species: N. schinzianum

Binomial name
- Namacodon schinzianum (Markgr.) Thulin

Synonyms
- Prismatocarpus schinzianus Markgr.

Genus of flowering plants

Namacodon schinzianum is a species of plant in the family Campanulaceae, endemic to Namibia. It was originally described by Friedrich Markgraf in 1941 as Prismatocarpus schinzianus, but was moved to its own genus, Namacodon by Mats Thulin in 1974. It is known from fewer than 20 populations, all among rocks at 800–2,000 metres (2,600–6,600 ft) altitude.
