= Sergia (plant) =

Scientific classification
- Kingdom: Plantae
- Clade: Tracheophytes
- Clade: Angiosperms
- Clade: Eudicots
- Clade: Asterids
- Order: Asterales
- Family: Campanulaceae
- Subfamily: Campanuloideae
- Genus: Sergia; Fed. (1957)

Genus of flowering plants

Sergia is a genus of plants in the family Campanulaceae. It contains two known species, both native to Central Asia.

- Sergia regelii (Trautv.) Fed. – Tajikistan
- Sergia sewerzowii (Regel) Fed. – Kazakhstan
