= Pseudocodon =

Scientific classification
- Kingdom: Plantae
- Clade: Tracheophytes
- Clade: Angiosperms
- Clade: Eudicots
- Clade: Asterids
- Order: Asterales
- Family: Campanulaceae
- Subfamily: Campanuloideae
- Genus: Pseudocodon; D.Y.Hong & H.Sun (2014)

Genus of plants

Pseudocodon is a genus of flowering plants belonging to the family Campanulaceae.

Its native range is the central Himalayas to south-central China.

== Species ==
Eight species are accepted.

- Pseudocodon convolvulaceus (Kurz) D.Y.Hong & H.Sun
- Pseudocodon graminifolius (H.Lév.) D.Y.Hong
- Pseudocodon grey-wilsonii (J.M.H.Shaw) D.Y.Hong
- Pseudocodon hirsutus (Hand.-Mazz.) D.Y.Hong
- Pseudocodon petiolatus D.Y.Hong & Q.Wang
- Pseudocodon retroserratus (Z.T.Wang & G.J.Xu) D.Y.Hong & Q.Wang
- Pseudocodon rosulatus (W.W.Sm.) D.Y.Hong
- Pseudocodon vinciflorus (Kom.) D.Y.Hong
