= Microcodon =

Scientific classification
- Kingdom: Plantae
- Clade: Tracheophytes
- Clade: Angiosperms
- Clade: Eudicots
- Clade: Asterids
- Order: Asterales
- Family: Campanulaceae
- Subfamily: Campanuloideae
- Genus: Microcodon; A.DC.

Genus of flowering plants

Microcodon is a genus of plants in the family Campanulaceae. It contains four known species, all endemic to the Cape Provinces of South Africa.

- Microcodon glomeratus A.DC. 1830
- Microcodon hispidulus (L.f.) Sond. in W.H.Harvey 1865
- Microcodon linearis (L.f.) H.Buek in C.F.Ecklon & K.L.P.Zeyher 1837
- Microcodon sparsiflorus A.DC. 1830
