= Cryptocodon =

Scientific classification
- Kingdom: Plantae
- Clade: Tracheophytes
- Clade: Angiosperms
- Clade: Eudicots
- Clade: Asterids
- Order: Asterales
- Family: Campanulaceae
- Subfamily: Campanuloideae
- Genus: Cryptocodon; Fed. in V.L.Komarov
- Species: C. monocephalus

Binomial name
- Cryptocodon monocephalus (Trautv.) Fed. in V.L.Komarov

Synonyms
- Campanula monocephala Trautv.; Phyteuma monocephalum (Trautv.) Pavlov; Phyteuma occultans Popov & Vved.

Genus of flowering plants

Cryptocodon is a genus of plants in the family Campanulaceae. There is only one known species, Cryptocodon monocephalus, endemic to the Pamir Mountains of Tajikistan.
