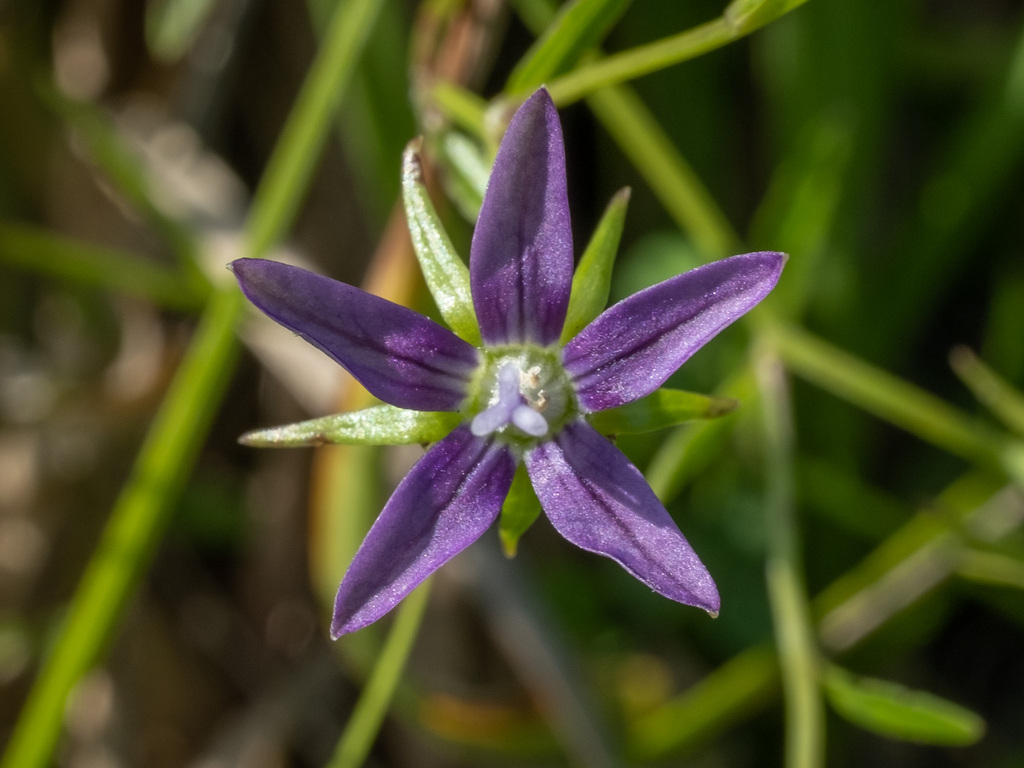
- Rotanthella floridana in flower

Conservation status
- Vulnerable (NatureServe)

Scientific classification
- Kingdom: Plantae
- Clade: Tracheophytes
- Clade: Angiosperms
- Clade: Eudicots
- Clade: Asterids
- Order: Asterales
- Family: Campanulaceae
- Genus: Rotanthella; Morin
- Species: R. floridana

Binomial name
- Rotanthella floridana (S.Watson ex A.Gray) Morin

Synonyms
- Rotantha Small, nom. illeg.; Campanula floridana S.Watson ex A.Gray (1878) (species basionym); Rotantha floridana (S.Watson ex A.Gray) Small

= Rotanthella =

Genus of flowering plants

Rotanthella is a genus of flowering plants in the family Campanulaceae. It includes a single species, Rotanthella floridana, commonly known as the Florida bellflower, a perennial endemic to Florida.

The species was first described as Campanula floridana in 1878. In 2020 Nancy Ruth Morin placed the species in the newly described monotypic genus Rotanthella as Rotanthella floridana.

== Description ==
It has a five-lobed purple corolla.

== Distribution and habitat ==
It grows in moist areas and up to 15 in (380 mm) high. Locations where it has been documented include Big Cypress National Preserve, Collier-Seminole State Park, Corkscrew Regional Ecosystem Watershed, Corkscrew Swamp Sanctuary, and Fakahatchee Strand Preserve State Park.
