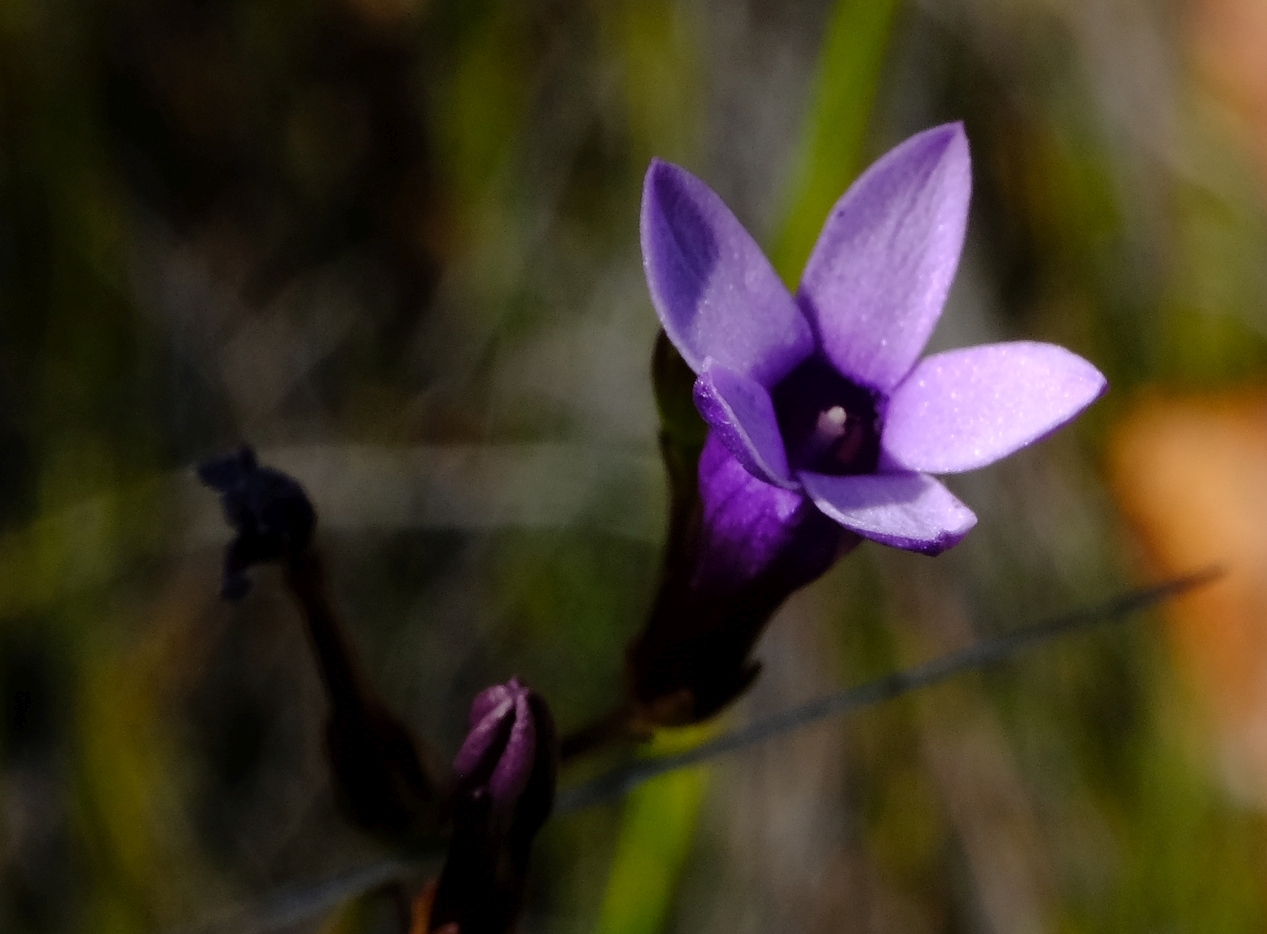
- Siphocodon spartioides

Scientific classification
- Kingdom: Plantae
- Clade: Tracheophytes
- Clade: Angiosperms
- Clade: Eudicots
- Clade: Asterids
- Order: Asterales
- Family: Campanulaceae
- Subfamily: Campanuloideae
- Genus: Siphocodon; Turcz. (1852)

Type species
- Siphocodon spartioides Turcz. (1852)

= Siphocodon =

Genus of flowering plants

Siphocodon is a genus of plants in the family Campanulaceae. It contains two known species, both endemic to Cape Province of South Africa.

Both species of Siphocodon are small, glabrous, wiry subshrubs associated with the nutrient-poor sandstone slopes of the southwestern Cape and are characteristic of the highly localized fynbos vegetation of the region. Siphocodon spartioides generally grows to about 30–60 cm tall, while S. debilis is somewhat smaller. The plants have sparse, minute, scale-like leaves and produce solitary flowers near the ends and upper parts of their stems. The flowers are narrowly tubular to bell-shaped, with five spreading lobes; those of S. spartioides are bluish-purple, while S. debilis has violet or whitish flowers with pinkish-brown markings. These distinctive floral and pollen characteristics make Siphocodon an interesting and highly specialized genus within the South African Campanulaceae.

- Siphocodon debilis Schltr.
- Siphocodon spartioides Turcz.
