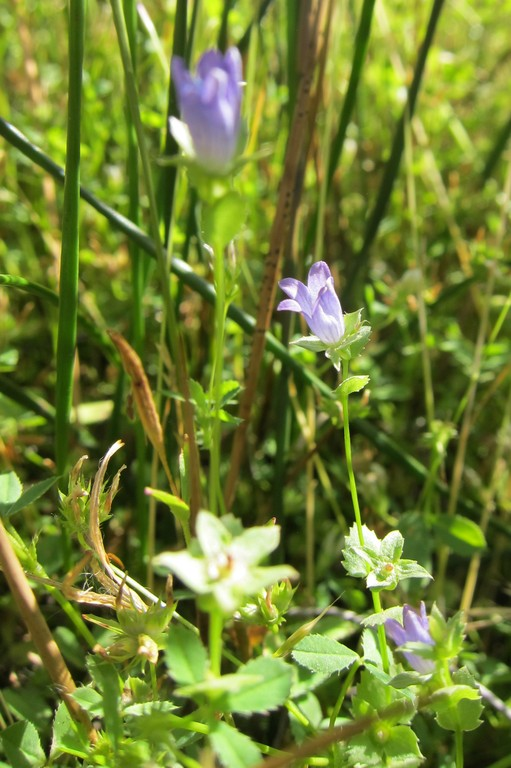

Conservation status
- Secure (NatureServe)

Scientific classification
- Kingdom: Plantae
- Clade: Tracheophytes
- Clade: Angiosperms
- Clade: Eudicots
- Clade: Asterids
- Order: Asterales
- Family: Campanulaceae
- Subfamily: Campanuloideae
- Genus: Heterocodon; Nutt.
- Species: H. rariflorum

Binomial name
- Heterocodon rariflorum Nutt.

Synonyms
- Specularia rariflora

= Heterocodon =

Genus of flowering plants

Heterocodon is a monotypic genus of plants in the bellflower family containing the single species Heterocodon rariflorum, which is known by the common names rareflower heterocodon and western pearlflower. It is native to western North America from British Columbia to California to Colorado, where it emerges during the spring in wet areas such as meadows. This is an annual herb producing a very thin, erect stem to 30 centimeters in maximum height. It branches few times if at all and is dark green to reddish in color. Leaves are occasional along the stem and are heart-shaped to rounded with a toothed edge. Also at occasions along the stem are the flowers, which emerge from a base of toothed or spiny leaflike sepals a few millimeters long. The corolla of the flower is a cylindrical tube 3 to 5 millimeters long, blue or lavender with darker veining and a lighter throat, and spreading into triangular lobes at the mouth.
