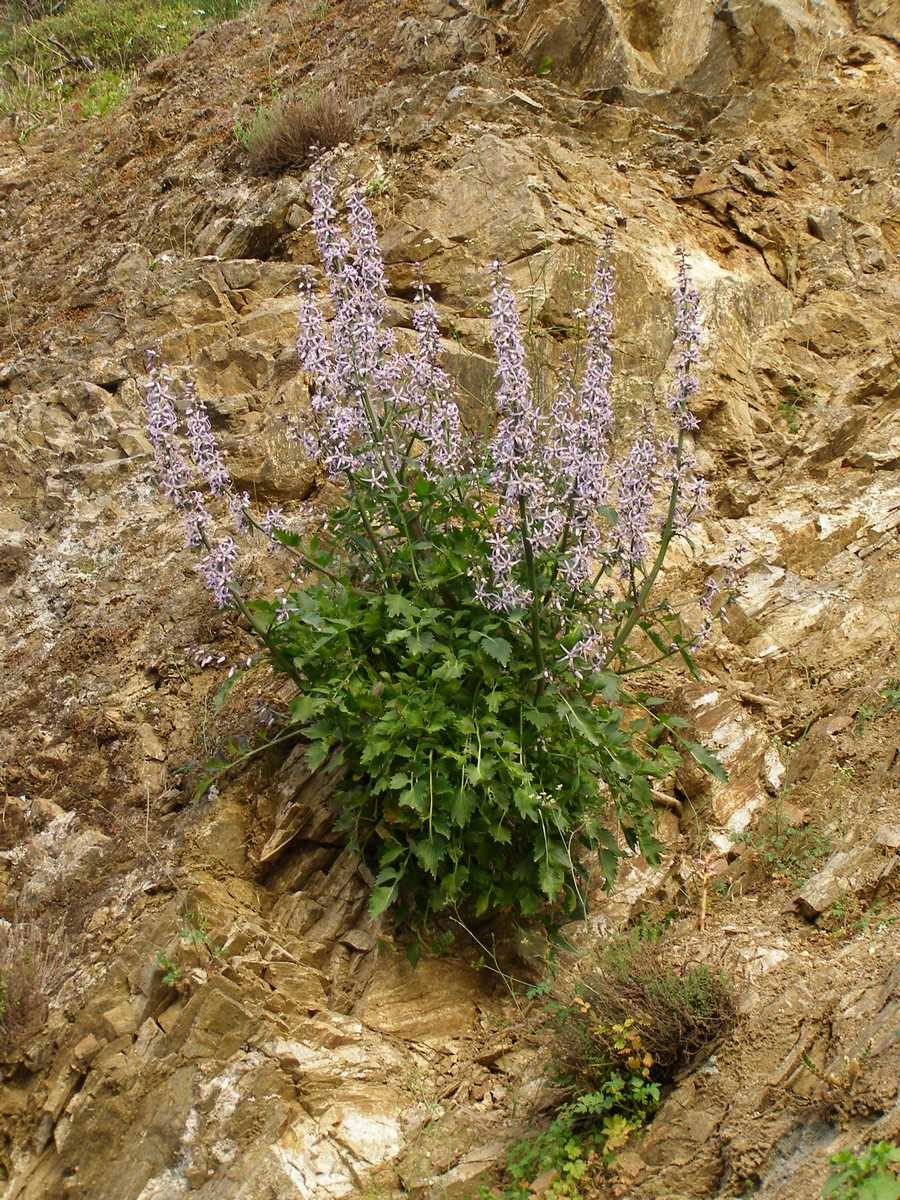

Scientific classification
- Kingdom: Plantae
- Clade: Tracheophytes
- Clade: Angiosperms
- Clade: Eudicots
- Clade: Asterids
- Order: Asterales
- Family: Campanulaceae
- Subfamily: Campanuloideae
- Genus: Petromarula; Vent. ex R.Hedw.
- Species: P. pinnata

Binomial name
- Petromarula pinnata (L.) A.DC.

Synonyms
- Phyteuma pinnatum L.; Petromarula pinnata var. pubescens A.DC.; Petromarula oxyloba Gand.; Petromarula pinnata f. oxyloba (Gand.) Hayek

= Petromarula =

Genus of flowering plants

Petromarula is a genus of plants in the family Campanulaceae. There is only one known species, Petromarula pinnata, endemic to the island of Crete in the Mediterranean. The name "Petromarula" means "rock lettuce" in Greek, a reference to the plant's traditional use in salads.

== Description ==
Petromarula pinnata is a robust, medium to tall perennial, minutely hairy above. Leaves mostly in a large basal rosette, pinnate to pinnately-lobed, the lower long-stalked; leaflets oval to oblong, coarsely toothed. Flowers pale blue, 9–10 mm, borne in large rather narrow panicles; corolla with 5 spreading to recurved linear lobes. Capsule opening by 3 pores in the middle. Flowers April–May.

== Habitat ==
Rock crevices, cliffs and old walls.

== Gallery ==
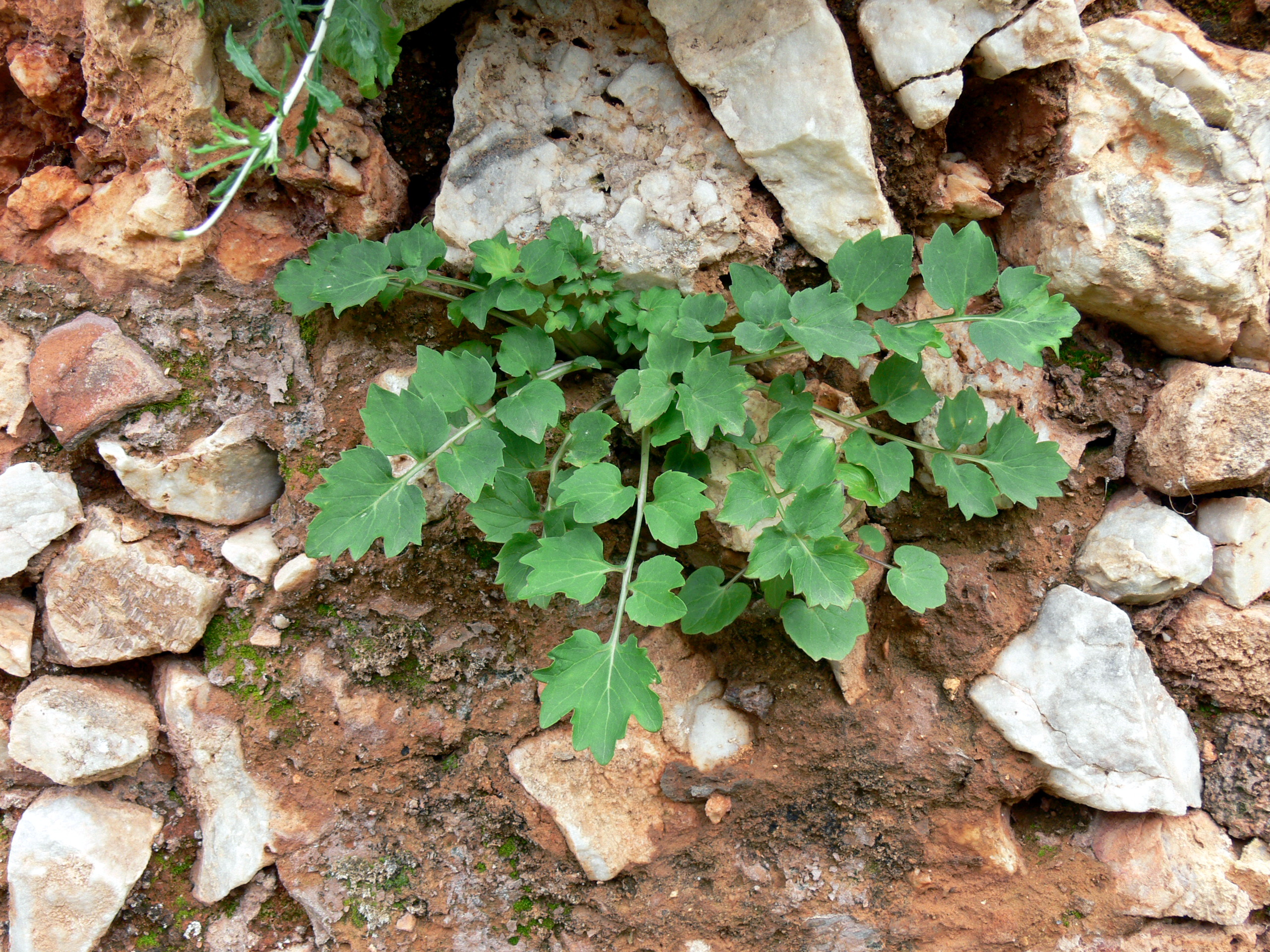

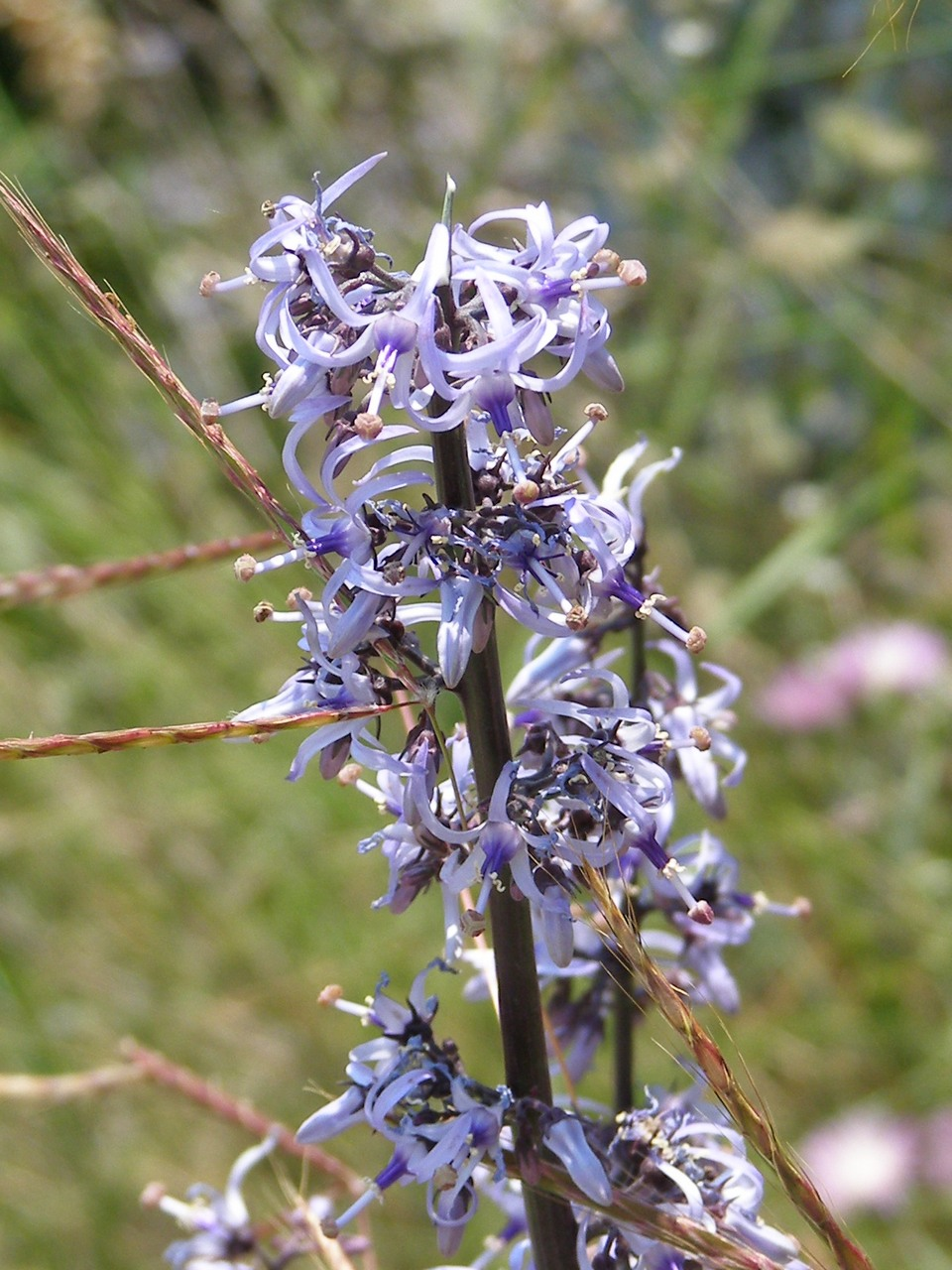

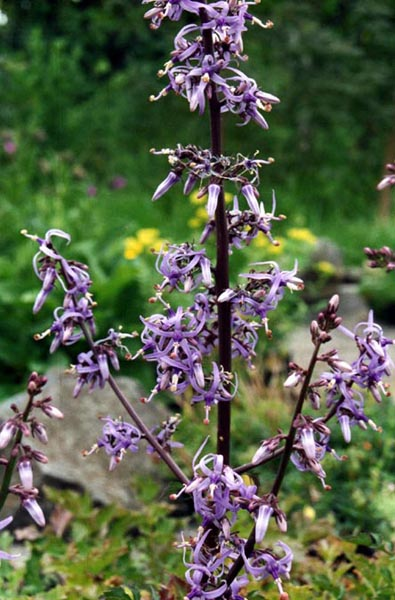

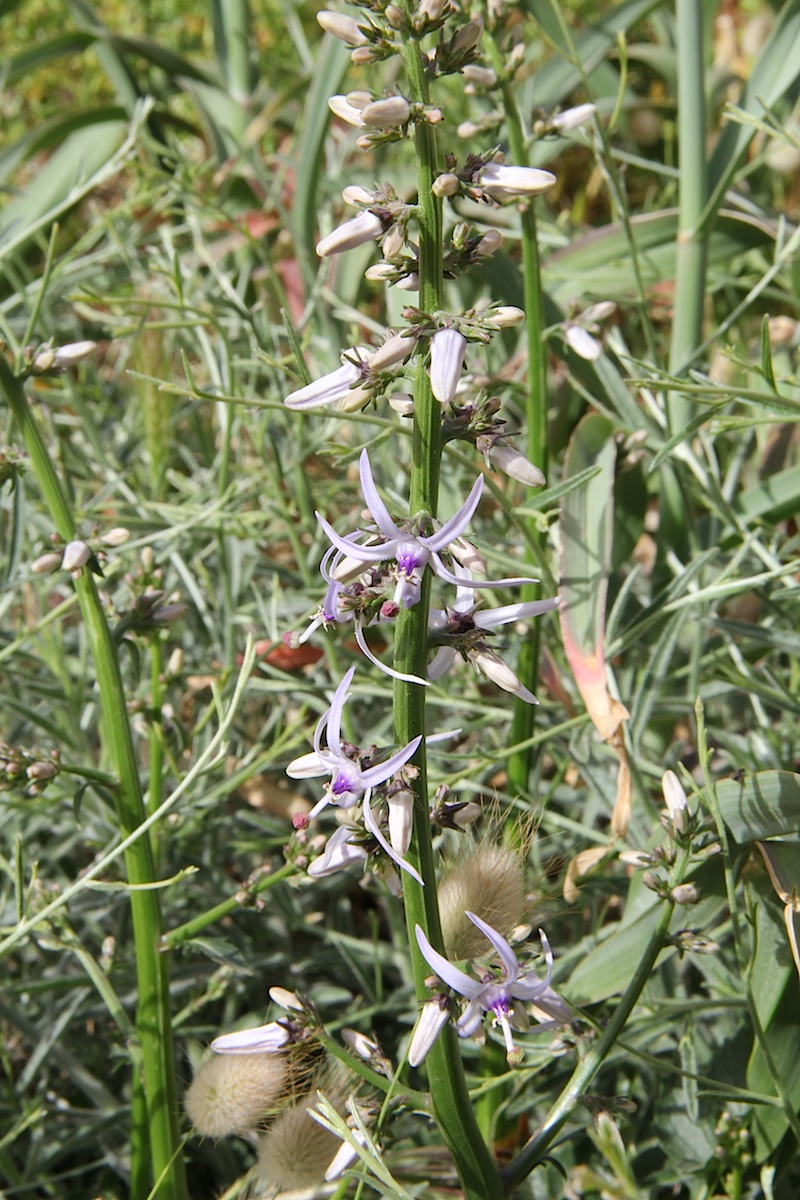
