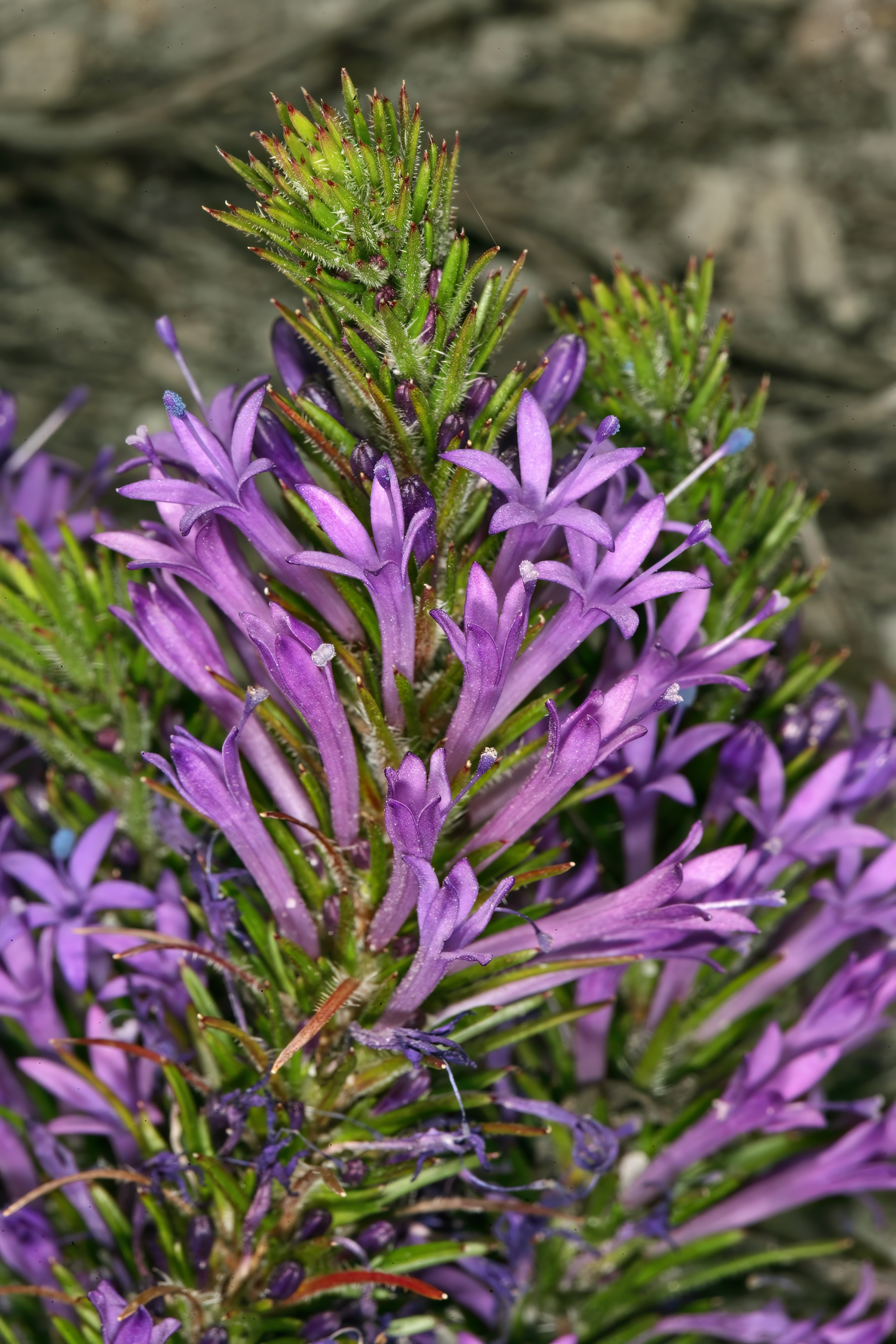
- Merciera azurea flowers

Scientific classification
- Kingdom: Plantae
- Clade: Tracheophytes
- Clade: Angiosperms
- Clade: Eudicots
- Clade: Asterids
- Order: Asterales
- Family: Campanulaceae
- Subfamily: Campanuloideae
- Genus: Merciera; A.DC.

= Merciera =

Genus of flowering plants

Merciera is a genus of plants in the family Campanulaceae. It contains 6 known species, all endemic to Cape Province in South Africa.

- Merciera azurea Schltr. 1897
- Merciera brevifolia A.DC. 1830
- Merciera eckloniana H.Buek in C.F.Ecklon & K.L.P.Zeyher 1837
- Merciera leptoloba A.DC. 1830
- Merciera tenuifolia (L.f.) A.DC. 1830
- Merciera tetraloba Cupido 2002
