= Homocodon =

Scientific classification
- Kingdom: Plantae
- Clade: Tracheophytes
- Clade: Angiosperms
- Clade: Eudicots
- Clade: Asterids
- Order: Asterales
- Family: Campanulaceae
- Subfamily: Campanuloideae
- Genus: Homocodon; D.Y.Hong

Type species
- Homocodon brevipes (Hemsl.) D.Y.Hong

Genus of flowering plants

Homocodon is a genus of plants in the family Campanulaceae. It contains two known species, native to the mountains of southwestern China and Bhutan.

- Homocodon brevipes (Hemsl.) D.Y.Hong - Bhutan, Guizhou, Sichuan, Yunnan
- Homocodon pedicellatum D.Y.Hong & L.M.Ma - Sichuan
