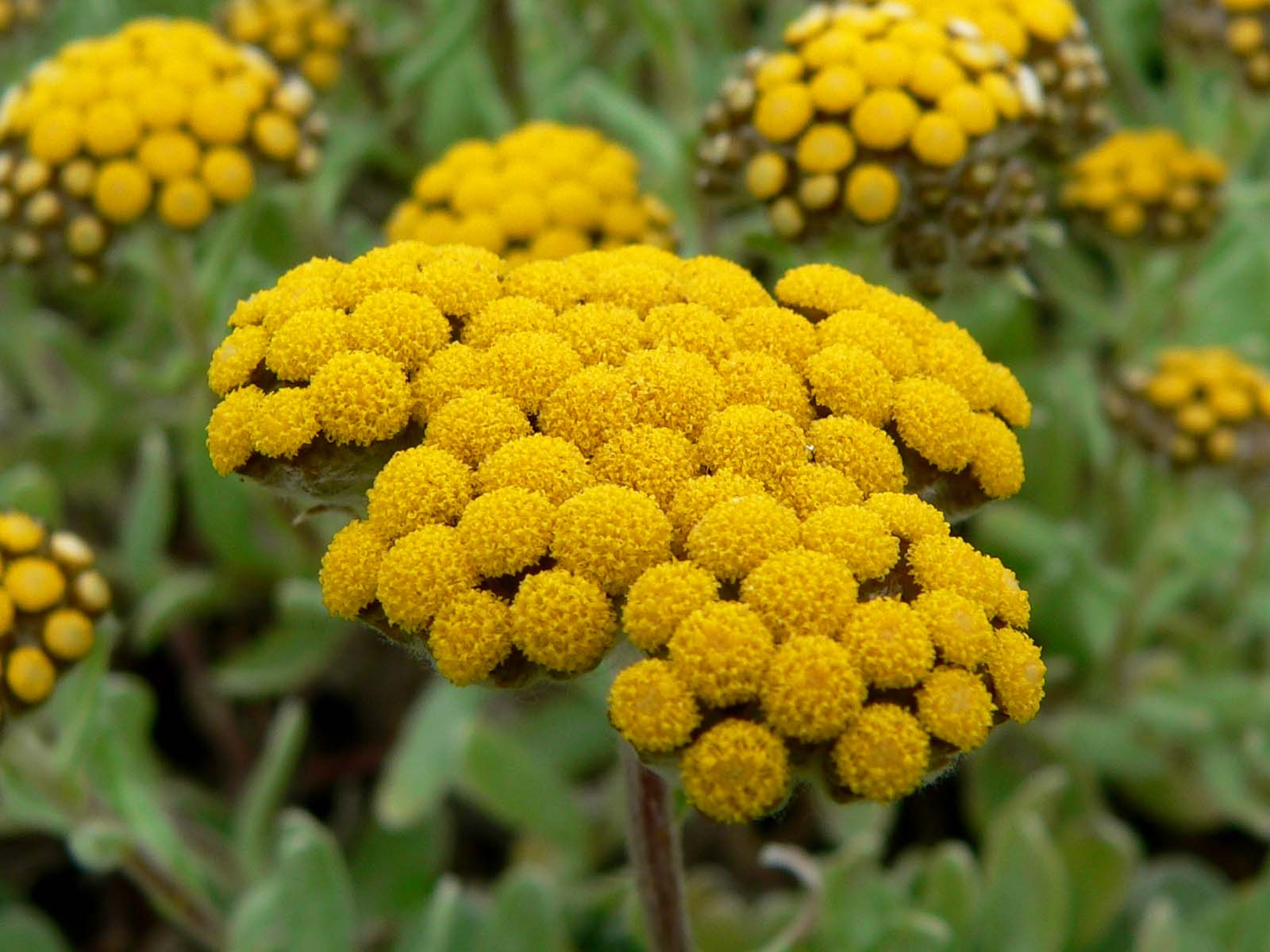
- Helichrysum basalticum

Scientific classification
- Kingdom: Plantae
- Clade: Tracheophytes
- Clade: Angiosperms
- Clade: Eudicots
- Clade: Asterids
- Order: Asterales
- Family: Asteraceae
- Subfamily: Asteroideae
- Tribe: Gnaphalieae; Cass. ex Lecoq & Juillet

Genera
- See text

= Gnaphalieae =

Tribe of flowering plants

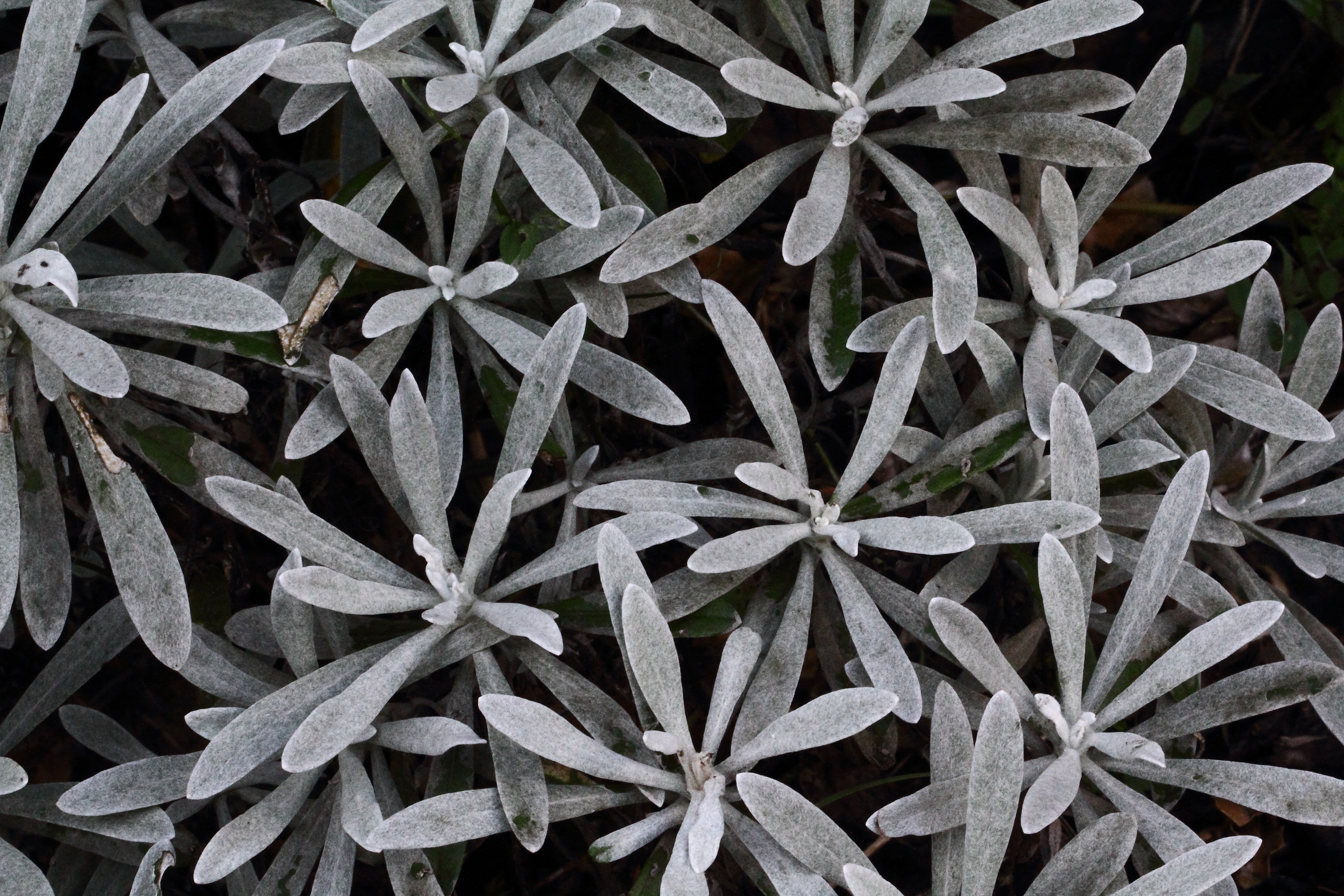
The pubescent foliage of Helichrysum orientale

The Gnaphalieae, commonly known as paper daisies, are a tribe of flowering plants in the family Asteraceae. It is most closely related to the tribes Anthemideae, Astereae, and Calenduleae.

== Characteristics ==
This group is most diverse in South America, Southern Africa and Australia. There are only a few genera with species native to north temperate regions: Anaphalis, Antennaria, Gamochaeta, Helichrysum, Leontopodium (Edelweiss), Phagnalon, Diaperia, and Pseudognaphalium.

The classification of the tribe into subtribes is unclear, with a number of past classifications not being supported by late 20th-century evidence.

== Genera ==
Gnaphalieae genera recognized by the Global Compositae Database as April 2022:

- × Filfia Holub
- Acanthocladium F.Muell.
- Achyrocline (Less.) DC.
- Acomis F.Muell.
- Actinobole Fenzl ex Endl.
- Alatoseta Compton
- Ammobium R.Br.
- Amphiglossa DC.
- Anaphalioides (Benth.) Kirp.
- Anaphalis DC.
- Anaxeton Gaertn.
- Ancistrocarphus A.Gray
- Anderbergia B.Nord.
- Andicolea Mayta & Molinari
- Anemocarpa Paul G.Wilson
- Angianthus J.C.Wendl.
- Antennaria Gaertn.
- Apalochlamys Cass.
- Argentipallium Paul G.Wilson
- Argyroglottis Turcz.
- Argyrotegium J.M.Ward & Breitw.
- Arrowsmithia DC.
- Asteridea Lindl.
- Athrixia Ker Gawl.
- Atrichantha Hilliard & B.L.Burtt
- Basedowia E.Pritz.
- Bellida Ewart
- Belloa J.Rémy
- Berroa Beauverd
- Blennospora A.Gray
- Bombycilaena (DC.) Smoljan.
- Bryomorphe Harv.
- Calocephalus R.Br.
- Calomeria Vent.
- Calotesta P.O.Karis
- Cassinia R.Br.
- Castroviejoa Galbany, L.Sáez & Benedí
- Catatia Humbert
- Cephalipterum A.Gray
- Cephalosorus A.Gray
- Chamaepus Wagenitz
- Chevreulia Cass.
- Chiliocephalum Benth.
- Chionolaena DC.
- Chondropyxis D.A.Cooke
- Chryselium Urtubey & S. E. Freire
- Chrysocephalum Walp.
- Chthonocephalus Steetz
- Cladochaeta DC.
- Coronidium Paul G. Wilson
- Craspedia G.Forst.
- Cremnothamnus Puttock
- Cuatrecasasiella H.Rob.
- Dasyanthus Bubani
- Decazesia F.Muell.
- Diaperia Nutt.
- Dicerothamnus Koek.
- Dielitzia P.S.Short
- Disparago Gaertn.
- Dithyrostegia A.Gray
- Dolichothrix Hilliard & B.L.Burtt
- Edmondia Cass.
- Elytropappus Cass.
- Epitriche Turcz.
- Eriochlamys Sond. & F.Muell.
- Erymophyllum Paul G.Wilson
- Euchiton Cass.
- Ewartia Beauverd
- Ewartiothamnus Anderb.
- Facelis Cass.
- Feldstonia P.S.Short
- Filago Loefl.
- Fitzwillia P.S.Short
- Fluminaria N.G.Bergh
- Galeomma Rauschert
- Gamochaeta Wedd.
- Gilberta Turcz.
- Gilruthia Ewart
- Gnaphaliothamnus Kirp.
- Gnaphalium L.
- Gnephosis Cass.
- Gnomophalium Greuter
- Gratwickia F.Muell.
- Haeckeria F.Muell.
- Haegiela P.S.Short & Paul G.Wilson
- Haptotrichion Paul G.Wilson
- Helichrysopsis Kirp.
- Helichrysum Mill.
- Hesperevax (A.Gray) A.Gray
- Humeocline Anderb.
- Hyalochlamys A.Gray
- Hyalosperma Steetz
- Hydroidea P.O.Karis
- Ifloga Cass.
- Ixiolaena Benth.
- Ixodia R.Br.
- Jalcophila M.O.Dillon & Sagást.
- Lachnospermum Willd.
- Langebergia Anderb.
- Laphangium (Hilliard & B.L.Burtt) Tzvelev
- Lasiopogon Cass.
- Lawrencella Lindl.
- Leiocarpa Paul G.Wilson
- Lemooria P.S.Short
- Leontopodium (Pers.) R.Br. ex Cass.
- Lepidostephium Oliv.
- Leptorhynchos Less.
- Leucochrysum (A.Cunn. ex DC.) Paul G.Wilson
- Leucogenes Beauverd
- Leucophyta R.Br.
- Leysera L.
- Logfia Cass.
- Lucilia Cass.
- Metalasia R.Br.
- Mexerion G.L.Nesom
- Micropsis DC.
- Micropus L.
- Millotia Cass.
- Mniodes (A.Gray) Benth. & Hook.f.
- Myriocephalus Benth.
- Myrovernix Koek.
- Neotysonia Dalla Torre & Harms
- Nestlera Spreng.
- Odixia Orchard
- Oedera L.
- Ozothamnus R.Br.
- Paenula Orchard
- Parantennaria Beauverd
- Pentatrichia Klatt
- Petalacte D.Don
- Phaenocoma D.Don
- Phagnalon Cass.
- Pithocarpa Lindl.
- Plecostachys Hilliard & B.L.Burtt
- Podolepis Labill.
- Podotheca Cass.
- Pogonolepis Steetz
- Polycalymma F.Muell. & Sond.
- Pseudognaphalium Kirp.
- Psilocarphus Nutt.
- Pterochaeta Steetz
- Pterygopappus Hook.f.
- Pycnosorus Benth.
- Quinetia Cass.
- Quinqueremulus Paul G.Wilson
- Rachelia J.M.Ward & Breitw.
- Raoulia Hook.f. ex Raoul
- Raouliopsis S.F.Blake
- Rhetinocarpha Paul G.Wilson & M.A.Wilson
- Rhodanthe Lindl.
- Rhynchopsidium DC.
- Rutidosis DC.
- Schoenia Steetz
- Scyphocoronis A.Gray
- Seriphium L.
- Siemssenia Steetz
- Siloxerus Labill.
- Sinoleontopodium Y.L.Chen
- Sondottia P.S.Short
- Stenocline DC.
- Stenophalium Anderb.
- Stoebe L.
- Stuartina Sond.
- Stylocline Nutt.
- Swammerdamia DC.
- Syncarpha DC.
- Syncephalum DC.
- Taplinia Lander
- Tenrhynea Hilliard & B.L.Burtt
- Thiseltonia Hemsl.
- Tietkensia P.S.Short
- Toxanthes Turcz.
- Trichanthodium Sond. & F.Muell.
- Triptilodiscus Turcz.
- Troglophyton Hilliard & B.L.Burtt
- Vellereophyton Hilliard & B.L.Burtt
- Waitzia J.C.Wendl.
- Xerochrysum Tzvelev

=== Other genera ===
- Callilepis (may not belong in this tribe)
- Libinhania
- Omalotheca
- Oxylaena
- Planea
