= Langebergia =

Scientific classification
- Kingdom: Plantae
- Clade: Embryophytes
- Clade: Tracheophytes
- Clade: Angiosperms
- Clade: Eudicots
- Clade: Asterids
- Order: Asterales
- Family: Asteraceae
- Subfamily: Asteroideae
- Tribe: Gnaphalieae
- Genus: Langebergia; Anderb.
- Species: L. canescens

Binomial name
- Langebergia canescens (DC.) Anderb.

Synonyms
- Petalacte sect. Ampilasia DC.; Petalacte canescens DC.; Anaxeton canescens (DC.) Benth. & Hook. ex B.D.Jacks.

Genus of flowering plants

Langebergia is a genus of South African flowering plants in the tribe Gnaphalieae within the family Asteraceae.

Species

There is only one known species, Langebergia canescens, native to the Western Cape Province.
