= Planea =

Conservation status
- Critically endangered (SANBI Red List)

Scientific classification
- Kingdom: Plantae
- Clade: Tracheophytes
- Clade: Angiosperms
- Clade: Eudicots
- Clade: Asterids
- Order: Asterales
- Family: Asteraceae
- Subfamily: Asteroideae
- Tribe: Gnaphalieae
- Genus: Planea; P.O.Karis
- Species: P. schlechteri

Binomial name
- Planea schlechteri (L.Bolus) P.O.Karis

Synonyms
- Metalasia schlechteri L.Bolus

Genus of plants

Planea is a genus of flowering plants in the tribe Gnaphalieae within the family Asteraceae. The only known species is Planea schlechteri, a rare and threatened species known from only a single population in Western Cape Province in South Africa.
