= Chryselium =

Scientific classification
- Kingdom: Plantae
- Clade: Tracheophytes
- Clade: Angiosperms
- Clade: Eudicots
- Clade: Asterids
- Order: Asterales
- Family: Asteraceae
- Subfamily: Asteroideae
- Tribe: Gnaphalieae
- Genus: Chryselium; Urtubey & S.E.Freire
- Species: C. gnaphalioides

Binomial name
- Chryselium gnaphalioides (Kunth) Urtubey & S.E.Freire

Genus of flowering plants

Chryselium is a genus of flowering plants belonging to the family Asteraceae. It contains a single species, Chryselium gnaphalioides.

Its native range is from Western South America to Venezuela.
