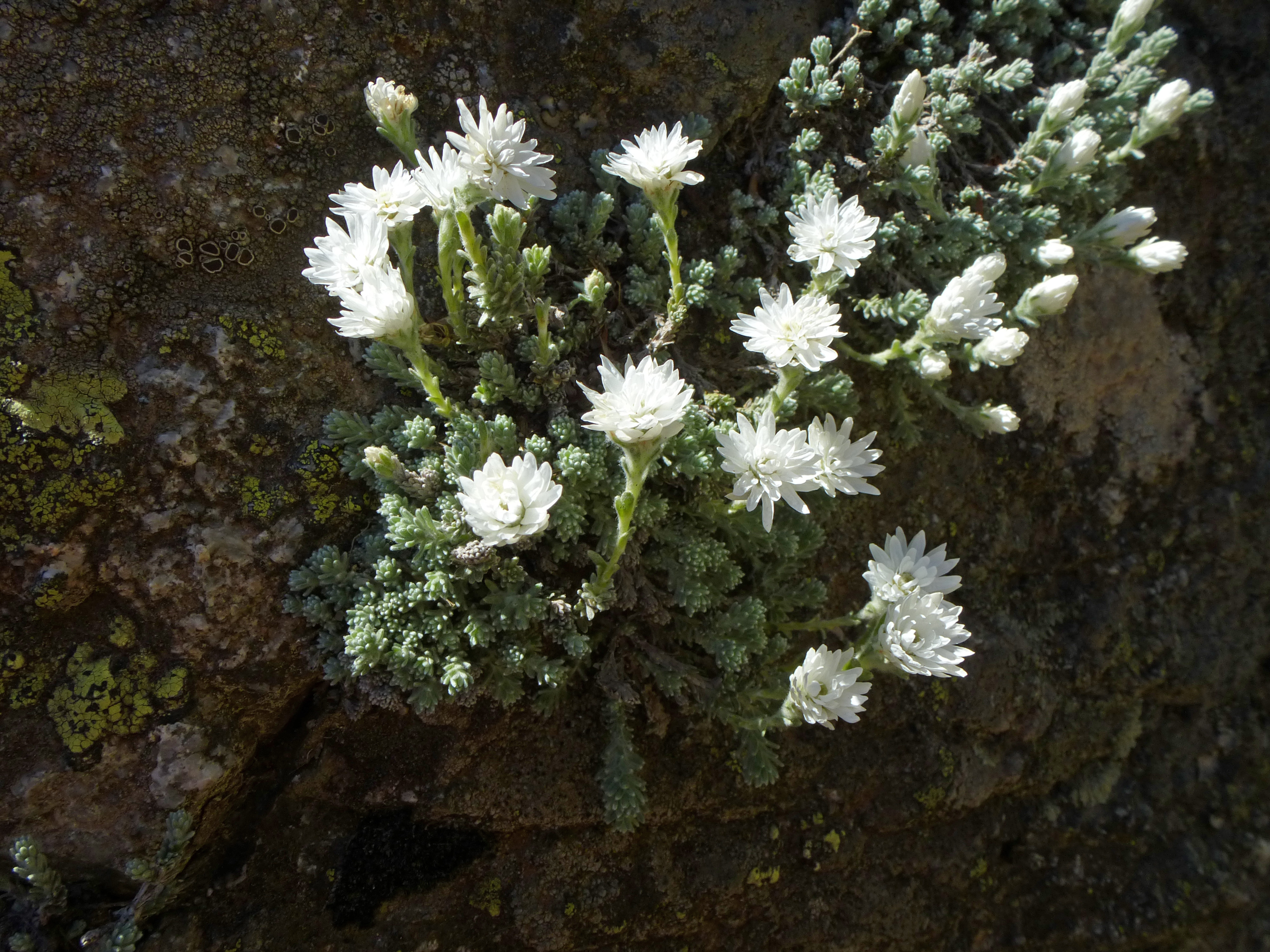
- Castroviejoa frigida in its natural habitat

Scientific classification
- Kingdom: Plantae
- Clade: Embryophytes
- Clade: Tracheophytes
- Clade: Angiosperms
- Clade: Eudicots
- Clade: Asterids
- Order: Asterales
- Family: Asteraceae
- Subfamily: Asteroideae
- Tribe: Gnaphalieae
- Genus: Castroviejoa; Galbany, L. Sáez & Benedí

= Castroviejoa =

Genus of flowering plants

Castroviejoa is a genus of plants in the family Asteraceae, native to certain islands in the western Mediterranean.

Species

- Castroviejoa frigida (Labill.) Galbany, L.Sáez & Benedí - Corsica, Sardinia
- Castroviejoa montelinasana (Em.Schmid) Galbany, L.Sáez & Benedí - Sardinia
