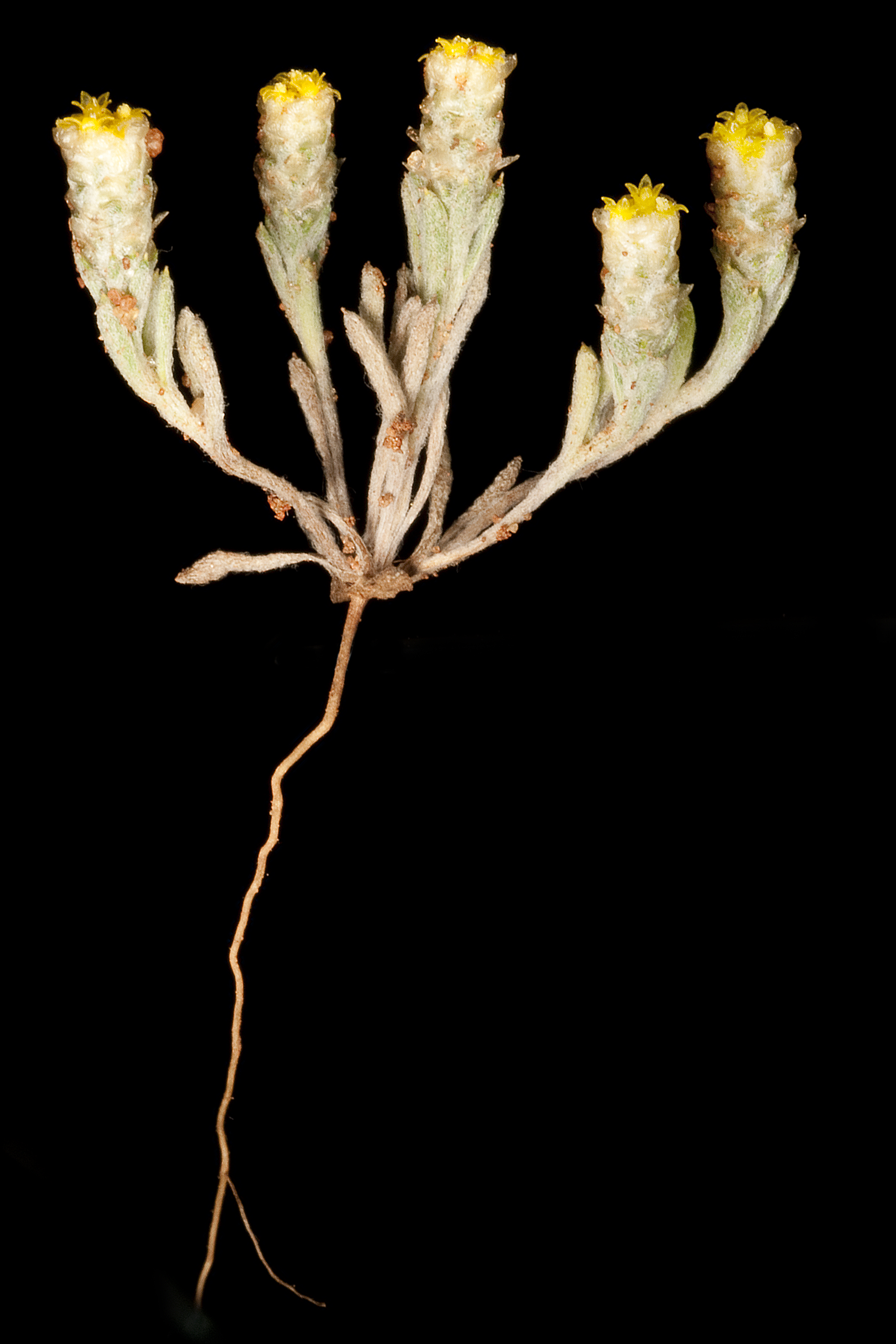

Scientific classification
- Kingdom: Plantae
- Clade: Tracheophytes
- Clade: Angiosperms
- Clade: Eudicots
- Clade: Asterids
- Order: Asterales
- Family: Asteraceae
- Subfamily: Asteroideae
- Tribe: Gnaphalieae
- Genus: Gilruthia; Ewart
- Species: G. osbornii

Binomial name
- Gilruthia osbornii Ewart & Jean White

Synonyms
- Calocephalus skeatsiana Ewart & Jean White; Gilruthia osborni Ewart & Jean White spelling variant

= Gilruthia =

Genus of flowering plants

Gilruthia is a genus of flowering plants in the family Asteraceae.

There is only one known species, Gilruthia osbornii, endemic to Western Australia.
