= Quinqueremulus =

Scientific classification
- Kingdom: Plantae
- Clade: Embryophytes
- Clade: Tracheophytes
- Clade: Angiosperms
- Clade: Eudicots
- Clade: Asterids
- Order: Asterales
- Family: Asteraceae
- Subfamily: Asteroideae
- Tribe: Gnaphalieae
- Genus: Quinqueremulus; Paul G.Wilson
- Species: Q. linearis

Binomial name
- Quinqueremulus linearis Paul G.Wilson

Genus of plants

Quinqueremulus is a genus of flowering plants in the family Asteraceae.

There is only one known species, Quinqueremulus linearis, endemic to Western Australia.
