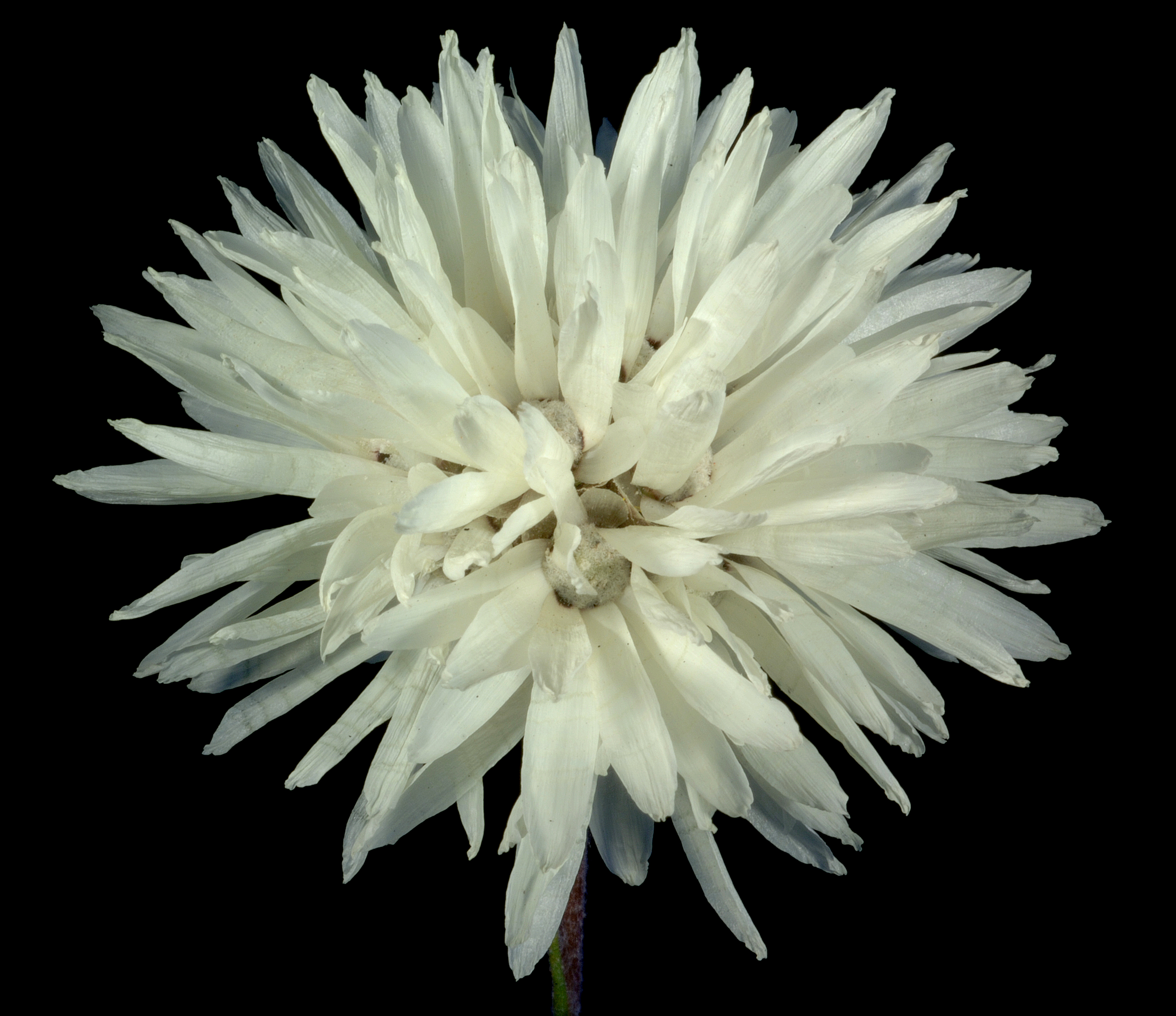

Scientific classification
- Kingdom: Plantae
- Clade: Embryophytes
- Clade: Tracheophytes
- Clade: Angiosperms
- Clade: Eudicots
- Clade: Asterids
- Order: Asterales
- Family: Asteraceae
- Subfamily: Asteroideae
- Tribe: Gnaphalieae
- Genus: Cephalipterum; A.Gray
- Species: C. drummondii

Binomial name
- Cephalipterum drummondii A.Gray

= Cephalipterum =

Genus of flowering plants

Cephalipterum is a genus of flowering plants in the family Asteraceae.

There is only one known species, Cephalipterum drummondii, endemic to Australia (South Australia and Western Australia).
