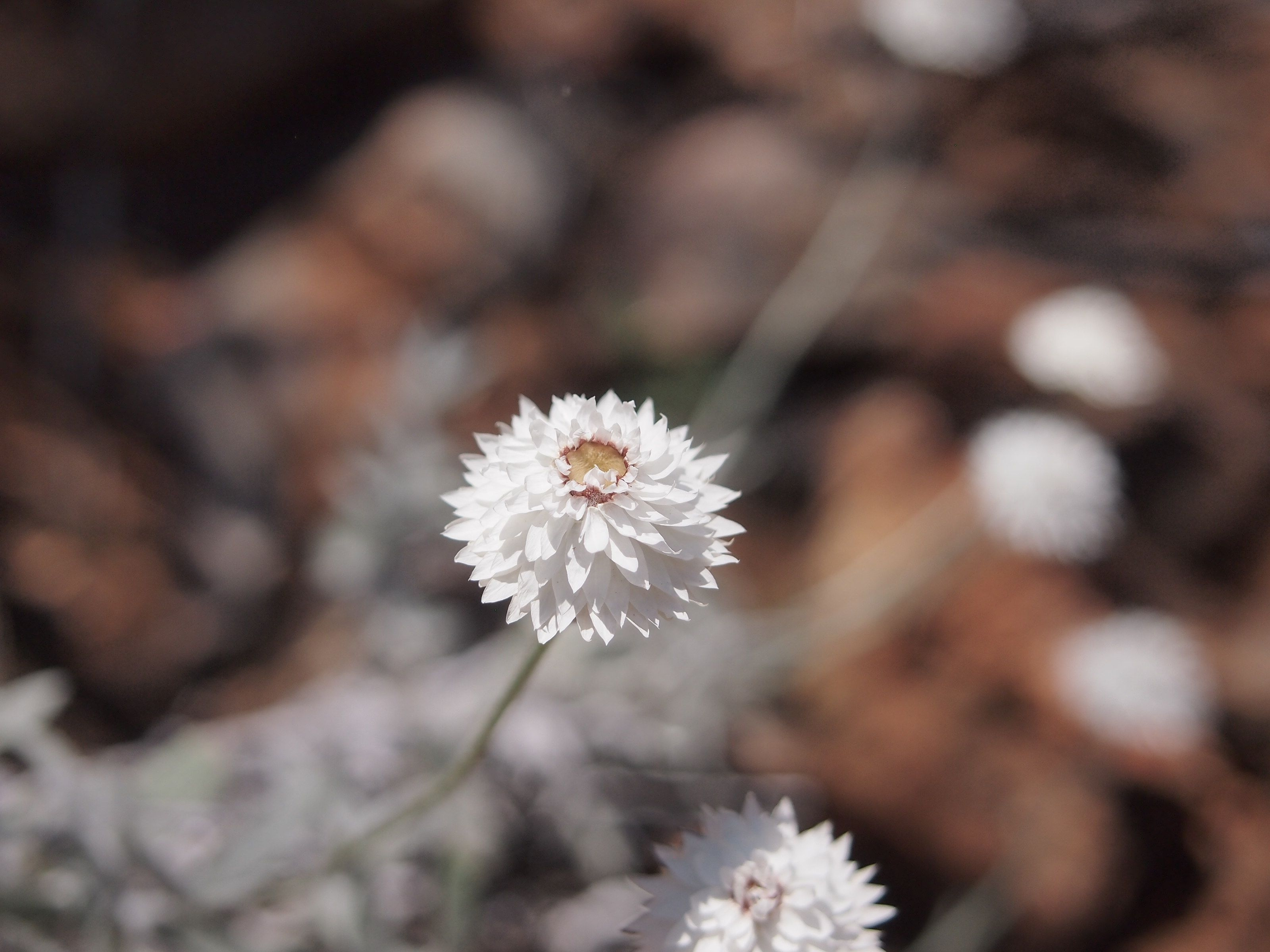
- Anemocarpa saxatilis

Scientific classification
- Kingdom: Plantae
- Clade: Embryophytes
- Clade: Tracheophytes
- Clade: Angiosperms
- Clade: Eudicots
- Clade: Asterids
- Order: Asterales
- Family: Asteraceae
- Subfamily: Asteroideae
- Tribe: Gnaphalieae
- Genus: Anemocarpa; Paul G.Wilson

= Anemocarpa =

Genus of flowering plants

Anemocarpa is a genus of flowering plants in the family Asteraceae, endemic to Australia.

Species

- Anemocarpa calcicola Paul G.Wilson
- Anemocarpa podolepidium (F.Muell.) Paul G.Wilson
- Anemocarpa saxatilis (Paul G.Wilson) PaulG.Wilson
