= Decazesia =

Scientific classification
- Kingdom: Plantae
- Clade: Tracheophytes
- Clade: Angiosperms
- Clade: Eudicots
- Clade: Asterids
- Order: Asterales
- Family: Asteraceae
- Subfamily: Asteroideae
- Tribe: Gnaphalieae
- Genus: Decazesia; F.Muell.
- Species: D. hecatocephala

Binomial name
- Decazesia hecatocephala F.Muell.

Genus of flowering plants

Decazesia is a genus of flowering plants in the family Asteraceae.

There is only one known species, Decazesia hecatocephala, endemic to Western Australia.
