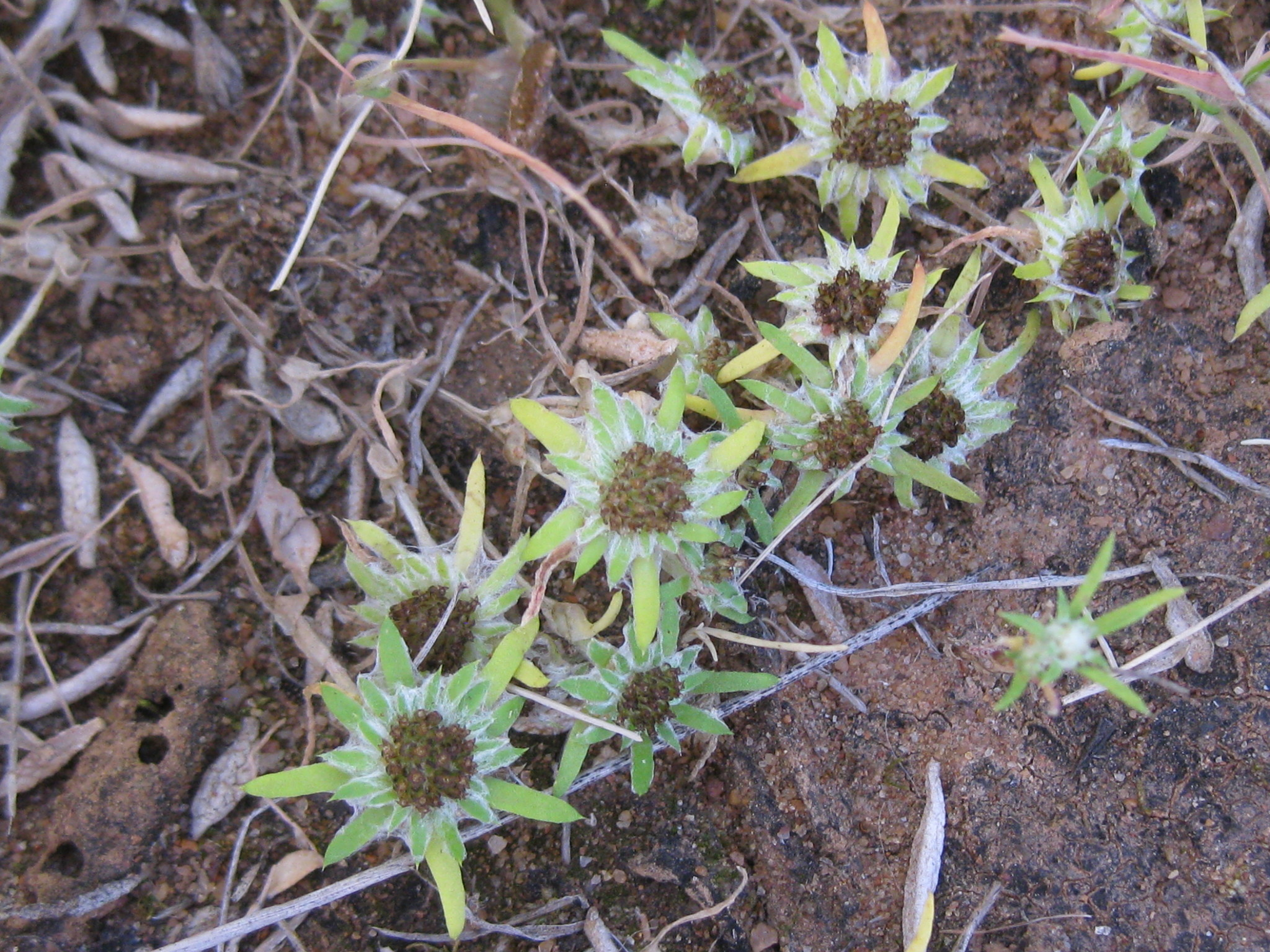

Scientific classification
- Kingdom: Plantae
- Clade: Tracheophytes
- Clade: Angiosperms
- Clade: Eudicots
- Clade: Asterids
- Order: Asterales
- Family: Asteraceae
- Subfamily: Asteroideae
- Tribe: Gnaphalieae
- Genus: Epitriche; Turcz.
- Species: E. demissus

Binomial name
- Epitriche demissus (A.Gray) P.S.Short

Synonyms
- Pteropogon sect. Pteropogonopsis A.Gray; Epitriche cuspidatus Turcz.; Skirrhophorus demissus A.Gray; Angianthus demissus (A.Gray) Benth.; Styloncerus demissus (A.Gray) Kuntze

= Epitriche =

Epitriche demissus

Genus of flowering plants

Epitriche is a genus of flowering plants in the family Asteraceae.

There is only one known species, Epitriche demissus, endemic to Western Australia.
