= Lemooria =

Scientific classification
- Kingdom: Plantae
- Clade: Tracheophytes
- Clade: Angiosperms
- Clade: Eudicots
- Clade: Asterids
- Order: Asterales
- Family: Asteraceae
- Subfamily: Asteroideae
- Tribe: Gnaphalieae
- Genus: Lemooria; P.S.Short
- Species: L. burkittii

Binomial name
- Lemooria burkittii (Benth.) P.S.Short

Synonyms
- Gnephosis burkittii Benth.; Angianthus burkittii (Benth.) J.M.Black; Angianthus whitei J.M.Black

Genus of flowering plants

Lemooria is a monotypic genus of flowering plants in the family Asteraceae, first described as a genus in 1989.

There is only one known species, Lemooria burkittii, commonly known as wires-and-wool. It is endemic to Australia where it has been recorded in every mainland state, including Western Australia, South Australia, Queensland, New South Wales, and Victoria, but is absent from Tasmania.
