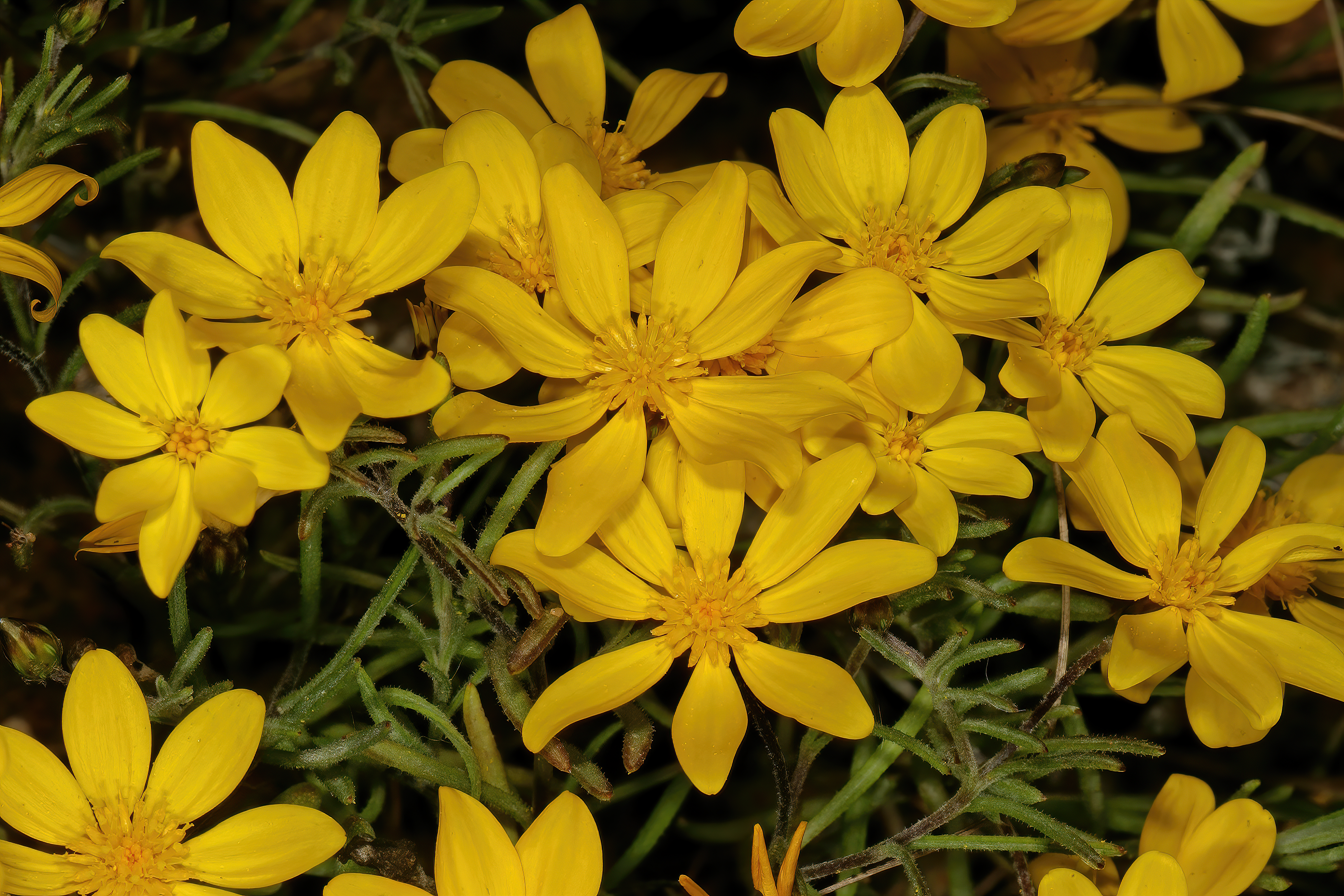
- Rhynchopsidium pumilum

Scientific classification
- Kingdom: Plantae
- Clade: Tracheophytes
- Clade: Angiosperms
- Clade: Eudicots
- Clade: Asterids
- Order: Asterales
- Family: Asteraceae
- Subfamily: Asteroideae
- Tribe: Gnaphalieae
- Genus: Rhynchopsidium; DC.

Synonyms
- Rhynchocarpus Less.

= Rhynchopsidium =

Genus of plants

Rhynchopsidium is a genus of South African plants in the tribe Gnaphalieae within the family Asteraceae. It is endemic to the Cape Provinces.

Species

- Rhynchopsidium pumilum (L.f.) DC.
- Rhynchopsidium sessiliflorum (L.f.) DC.
