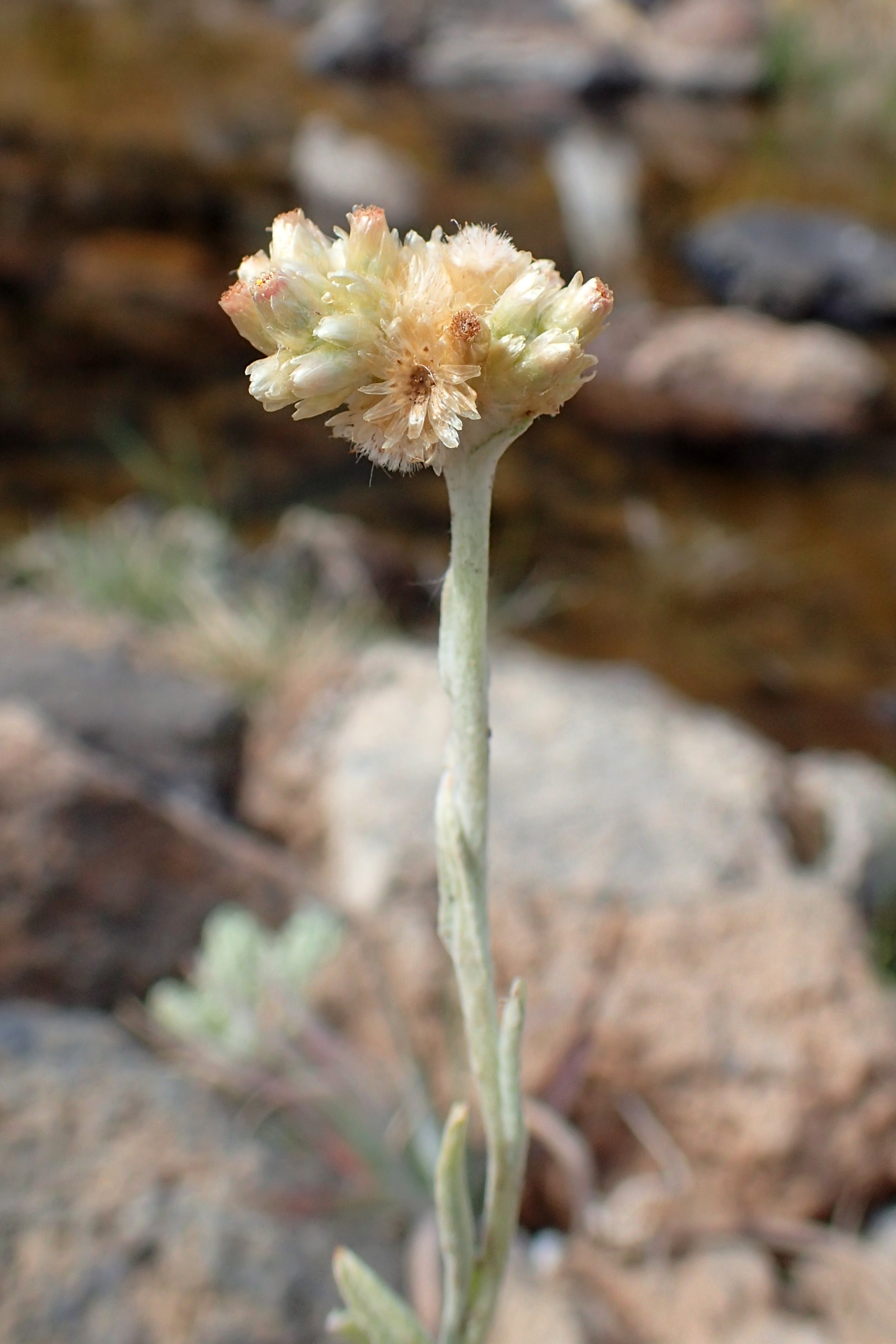
- Laphangium teydeum

Scientific classification
- Kingdom: Plantae
- Clade: Tracheophytes
- Clade: Angiosperms
- Clade: Eudicots
- Clade: Asterids
- Order: Asterales
- Family: Asteraceae
- Subfamily: Asteroideae
- Tribe: Gnaphalieae
- Genus: Laphangium (Hilliard & B.L. Burtt) Tzvelev

Synonyms
- Gnaphalium subg. Laphangium (Hilliard & B.L.Burtt) P.D.Sell; Pseudognaphalium subg. Laphangium Hilliard & B.L.Burtt

= Laphangium =

Genus of flowering plants

Laphangium is a genus of plants in the family Asteraceae.

Species

- Laphangium affine (D.Don) Tzvelev - Turkey, Republic of Georgia
- Laphangium luteoalbum (L.) Tzvelev - Europe, Middle East, North Africa
- Laphangium teydeum Wildpret & Greuter - Canary Islands
