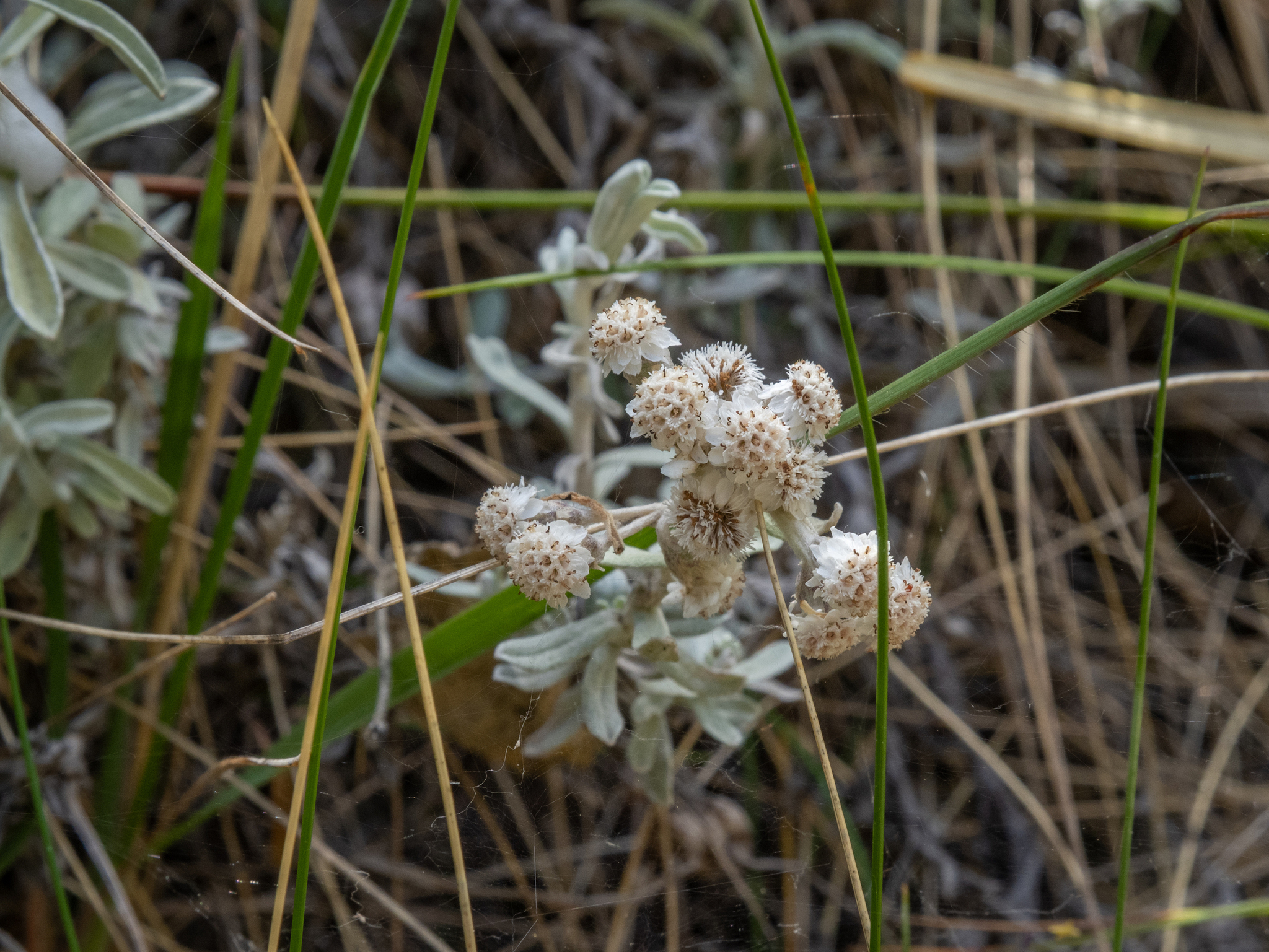

Scientific classification
- Kingdom: Plantae
- Clade: Tracheophytes
- Clade: Angiosperms
- Clade: Eudicots
- Clade: Asterids
- Order: Asterales
- Family: Asteraceae
- Subfamily: Asteroideae
- Tribe: Gnaphalieae
- Genus: Ewartiothamnus; Anderb.
- Species: E. sinclairii

Binomial name
- Ewartiothamnus sinclairii (Hook.f.) Anderb.

Synonyms
- Ewartia sinclairii (Hook.f.) Cheeseman; Gnaphalium sinclairii Hook.f.; Helichrysum sinclairii Hook.f

= Ewartiothamnus =

Genus of flowering plants

Ewartiothamnus is a genus of flowering plants in the family Asteraceae endemic to New Zealand. It contains a single species, Ewartiothamnus sinclairii. This species was redescribed by A. A. Anderberg and placed in the genus Ewartiothamnus in 1991. It is found in Marlborough region. This species flowers in the months of October until December and fruits from November until February.
