= Eriochlamys =

Scientific classification
- Kingdom: Plantae
- Clade: Embryophytes
- Clade: Tracheophytes
- Clade: Angiosperms
- Clade: Eudicots
- Clade: Asterids
- Order: Asterales
- Family: Asteraceae
- Tribe: Gnaphalieae
- Genus: Eriochlamys; Sond. & F.Muell.

Type species
- Eriochlamys behrii Sond. & F.Muell.

Genus of flowering plants

Eriochlamys is a genus of Australian flowering plants in the family Asteraceae.

Species

- Eriochlamys behrii Sond. & F.Muell. – New South Wales, Queensland, Victoria, Northern Territory, Western Australia, South Australia
- Eriochlamys cupularis N.G.Walsh – South Australia
- Eriochlamys eremaea N.G.Walsh – Northern Territory, Western Australia, South Australia
- Eriochlamys squamata N.G.Walsh – Victoria
