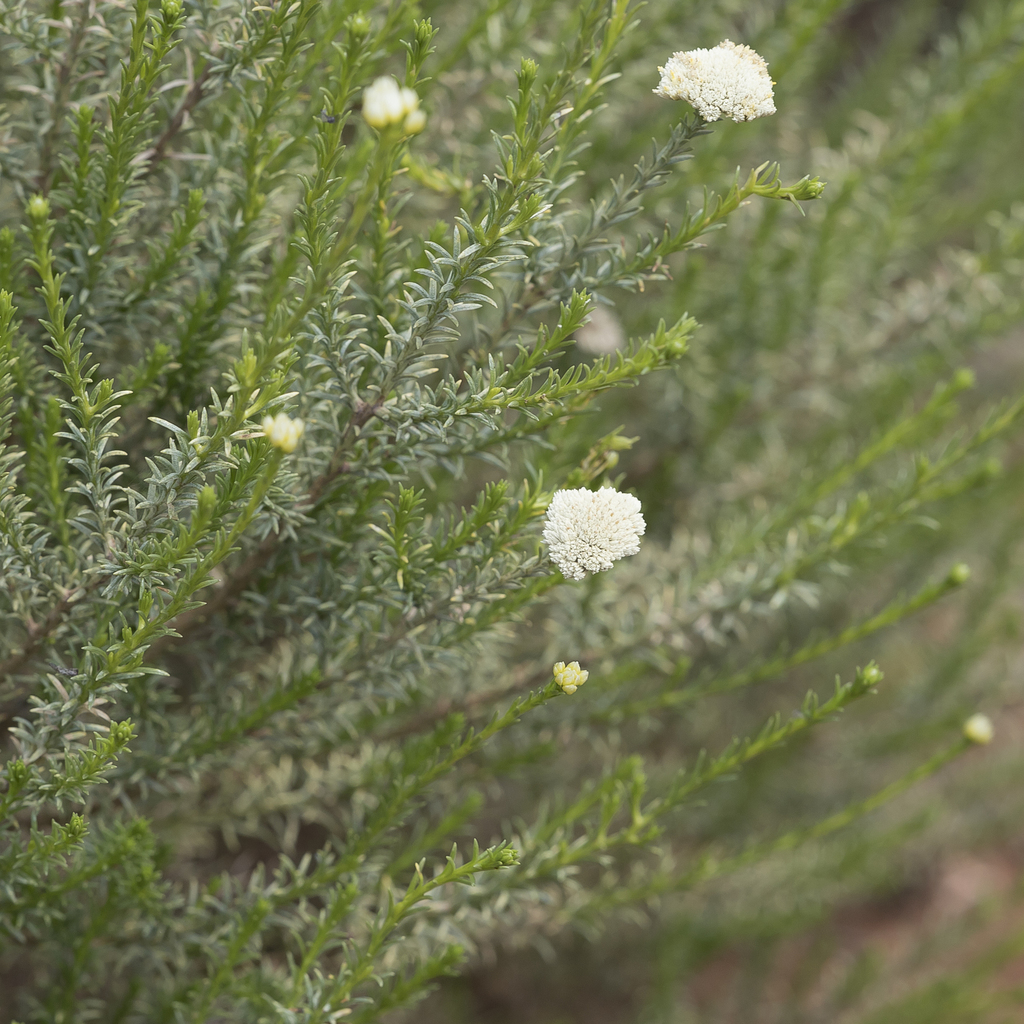

Scientific classification
- Kingdom: Plantae
- Clade: Tracheophytes
- Clade: Angiosperms
- Clade: Eudicots
- Clade: Asterids
- Order: Asterales
- Family: Asteraceae
- Subfamily: Asteroideae
- Tribe: Gnaphalieae
- Genus: Haeckeria; F.Muell.

Type species
- Haeckeria cassiniaeformis F.Muell.

= Haeckeria =

Genus of flowering plants

Haeckeria is a genus of flowering plants in the family Asteraceae described as a genus in 1853.

Species

- Haeckeria cassiniiformis F.Muell. - South Australia
- Haeckeria punctata J.H.Willis
- Haeckeria punctulata (F.Muell.) J.H.Willis - South Australia
