= Troglophyton =

Scientific classification
- Kingdom: Plantae
- Clade: Tracheophytes
- Clade: Angiosperms
- Clade: Eudicots
- Clade: Asterids
- Order: Asterales
- Family: Asteraceae
- Subfamily: Asteroideae
- Tribe: Gnaphalieae
- Genus: Troglophyton; Hilliard & B.L.Burtt

Genus of flowering plants

Troglophyton is a genus of flowering plants in the family Asteraceae, native to southern Africa.

Species

- Troglophyton acocksianum Hilliard
- Troglophyton capillaceum (Thunb.) Hilliard & B.L.Burtt
- Troglophyton elsiae Hilliard
- Troglophyton leptomerum Hilliard
- Troglophyton parvulum (Harv.) Hilliard & B.L.Burtt
- Troglophyton tenellum Hilliard
