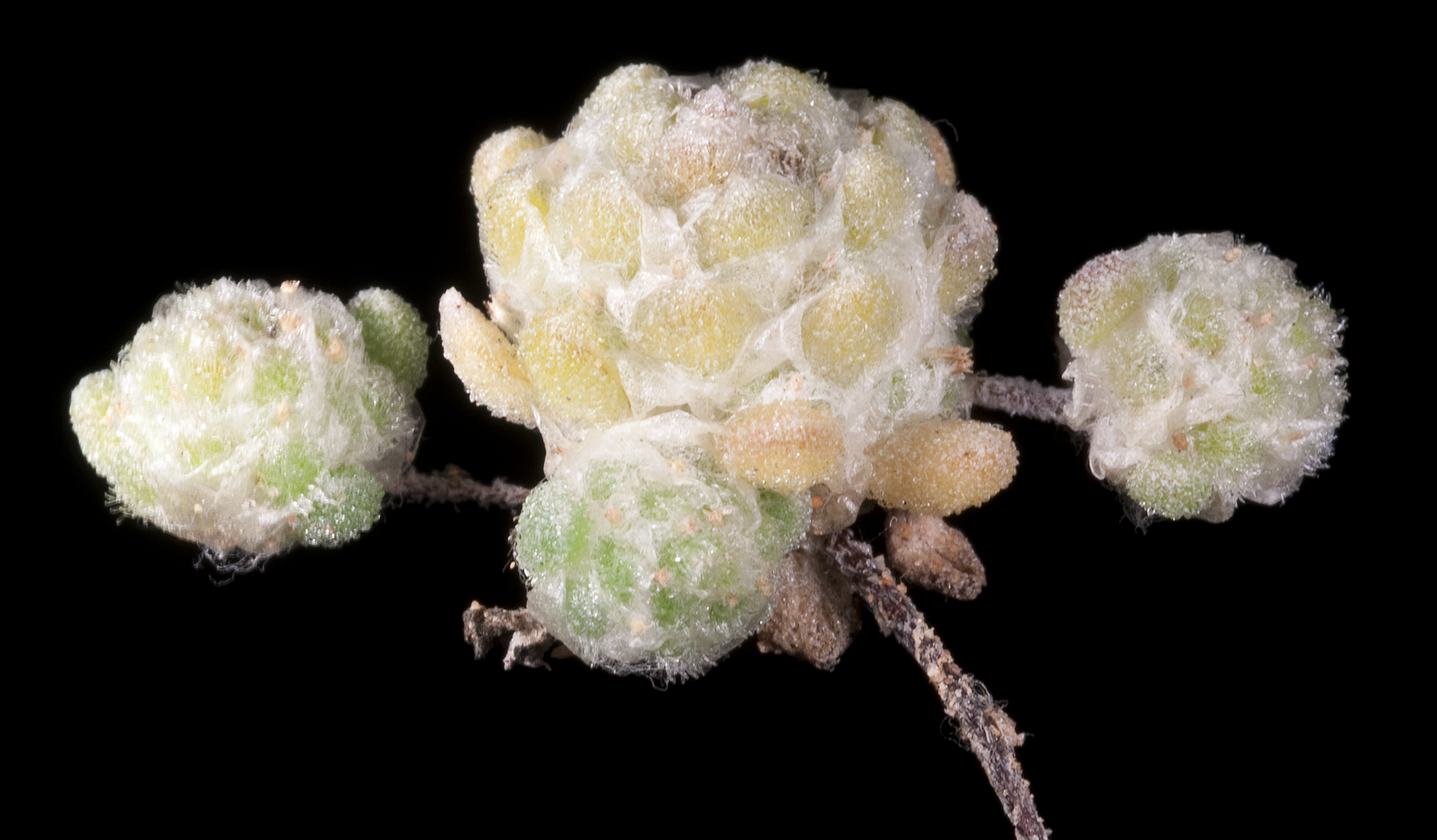

Scientific classification
- Kingdom: Plantae
- Clade: Tracheophytes
- Clade: Angiosperms
- Clade: Eudicots
- Clade: Asterids
- Order: Asterales
- Family: Asteraceae
- Subfamily: Asteroideae
- Tribe: Gnaphalieae
- Genus: Hyalochlamys; A.Gray
- Species: H. globifera

Binomial name
- Hyalochlamys globifera A.Gray

Synonyms
- Angianthus globifer (A.Gray) Benth.; Styloncerus globifer (A.Gray) Kuntze

= Hyalochlamys =

Genus of flowering plants

Hyalochlamys is a genus of Australian flowering plants in the family Asteraceae.

Species

There is only one known species, Hyalochlamys globifera, native to Western Australia.
