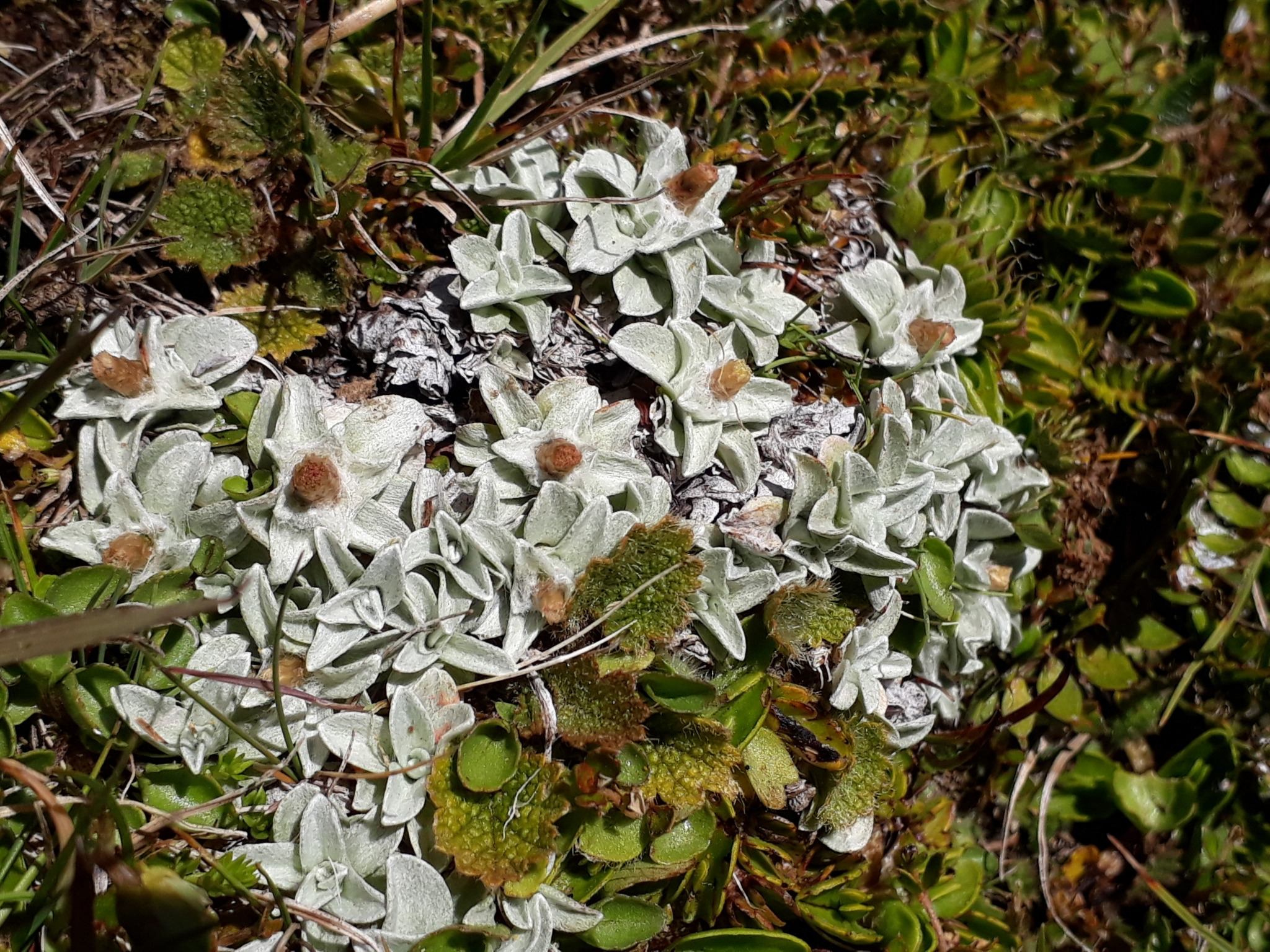
- Argyrotegium mackayi (Buchanan) J.M.Ward & Breitw.

Scientific classification
- Kingdom: Plantae
- Clade: Tracheophytes
- Clade: Angiosperms
- Clade: Eudicots
- Clade: Asterids
- Order: Asterales
- Family: Asteraceae
- Subfamily: Asteroideae
- Tribe: Gnaphalieae
- Genus: Argyrotegium; J.M.Ward & Breitw.

= Argyrotegium =

Genus of flowering plants

Argyrotegium is a genus of plants in the family Asteraceae, native to Australia and New Zealand.

Species

- Argyrotegium fordianum (M.Gray) J.M.Ward & Breitw. - New South Wales, Victoria, Tasmania
- Argyrotegium mackayi (Buchanan) J.M.Ward & Breitw. - New Zealand (North + South), Victoria, Tasmania
- Argyrotegium nitidulum (Hook.f.) J.M.Ward & Breitw. - New Zealand (South), Victoria, Tasmania
- Argyrotegium poliochlorum (N.G.Walsh) J.M.Ward & Breitw. - New South Wales, Victoria, Tasmania
