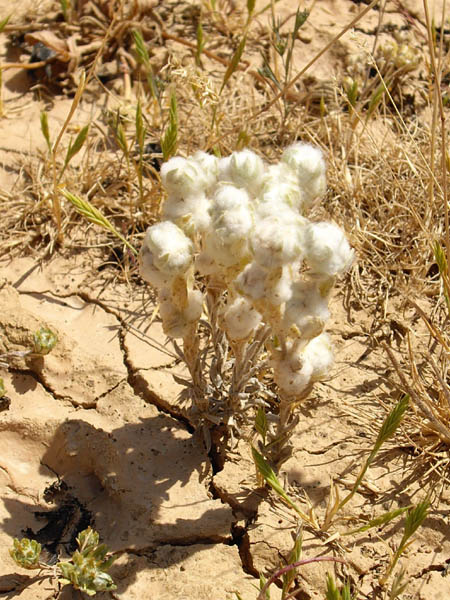
- Bombycilaena erecta

Scientific classification
- Kingdom: Plantae
- Clade: Embryophytes
- Clade: Tracheophytes
- Clade: Angiosperms
- Clade: Eudicots
- Clade: Asterids
- Order: Asterales
- Family: Asteraceae
- Subfamily: Asteroideae
- Tribe: Gnaphalieae
- Genus: Bombycilaena (DC.) Smoljan.

Type species
- Bombycilaena erecta (L.) Smoljan.

Synonyms
- Micropus sect. Bombycilaena DC.

= Bombycilaena =

Genus of flowering plants

Bombycilaena is a genus of flowering plants in the family Asteraceae. They are native to Europe, North Africa, southwestern Asia, + western North America.

species

- Bombycilaena californica - California, Oregon, Baja California
- Bombycilaena discolor - Mediterranean + southwest Asia from Spain + Morocco to Iran
- Bombycilaena erecta - Europe, + southwest Asia from Portugal + Morocco to Ukraine + Afghanistan
