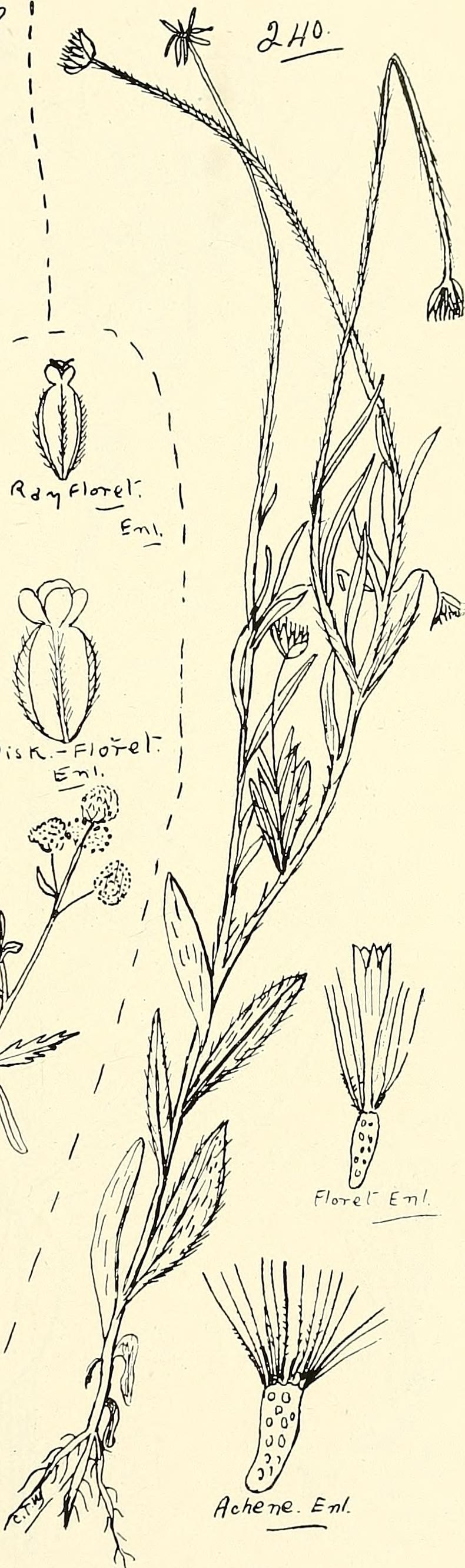
- Illustration of Acomis macra

Scientific classification
- Kingdom: Plantae
- Clade: Tracheophytes
- Clade: Angiosperms
- Clade: Eudicots
- Clade: Asterids
- Order: Asterales
- Family: Asteraceae
- Subfamily: Asteroideae
- Tribe: Gnaphalieae
- Genus: Acomis; F.Muell.

Type species
- Acomis macra F.Muell.

= Acomis =

Genus of flowering plants

Acomis is a genus of flowering plants in the family Asteraceae described as a genus in 1867. The entire genus is endemic to Australia. It was first described and published in Fragm. Vol.2 on page 89 in 1860.

Accepted species

- Acomis acoma (F.Muell.) Druce - Victoria
- Acomis bella A.E.Holland - Queensland
- Acomis kakadu Paul G.Wilson - Northern Territory
- Acomis macra F.Muell. - Queensland
