= Gratwickia =

Scientific classification
- Kingdom: Plantae
- Clade: Tracheophytes
- Clade: Angiosperms
- Clade: Eudicots
- Clade: Asterids
- Order: Asterales
- Family: Asteraceae
- Subfamily: Asteroideae
- Tribe: Gnaphalieae
- Genus: Gratwickia; F.Muell.
- Species: G. monochaeta

Binomial name
- Gratwickia monochaeta F.Muell.

Synonyms
- Helichrysum mellorianum J.M.Black; Helichrysum monochaetum (F.Muell.) H.Eichler

Genus of plants

Gratwickia is a genus of flowering plants in the family Asteraceae.

Species

There is only one known species, Gratwickia monochaeta, native to South Australia.
