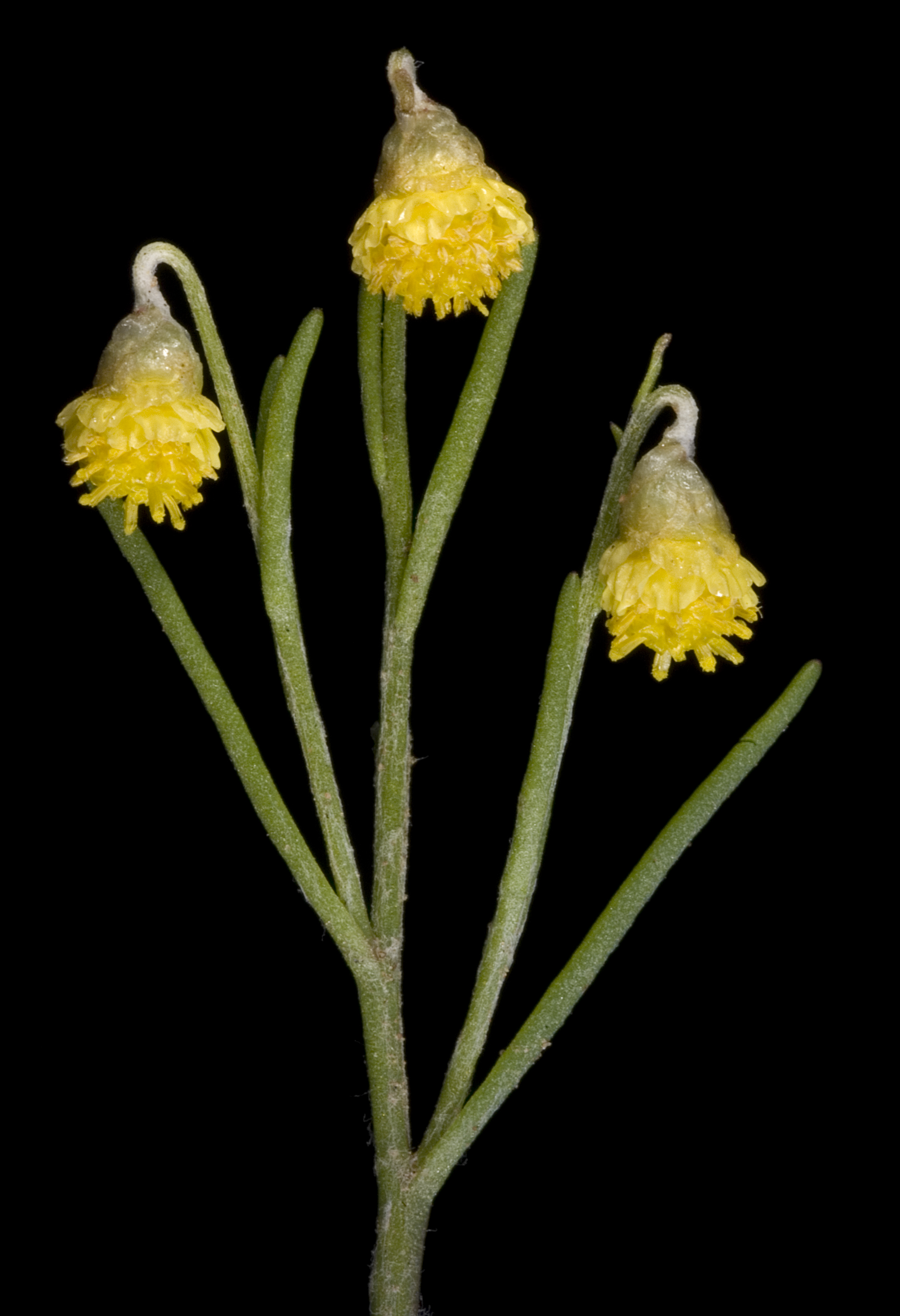

Scientific classification
- Kingdom: Plantae
- Clade: Tracheophytes
- Clade: Angiosperms
- Clade: Eudicots
- Clade: Asterids
- Order: Asterales
- Family: Asteraceae
- Subfamily: Asteroideae
- Tribe: Gnaphalieae
- Genus: Gilberta; Turcz.
- Species: G. tenuifolia

Binomial name
- Gilberta tenuifolia Turcz.

Synonyms
- Antheidosorus A.Gray; Myriocephalus gracilis (A.Gray) Benth.; Helipterum verecundum S.Moore; Antheidosorus gracilis A.Gray

= Gilberta =

Genus of flowering plants

Gilberta is a genus of flowering plants in the family Asteraceae.

Species

There is only one known species, Gilberta tenuifolia, endemic to Western Australia.
