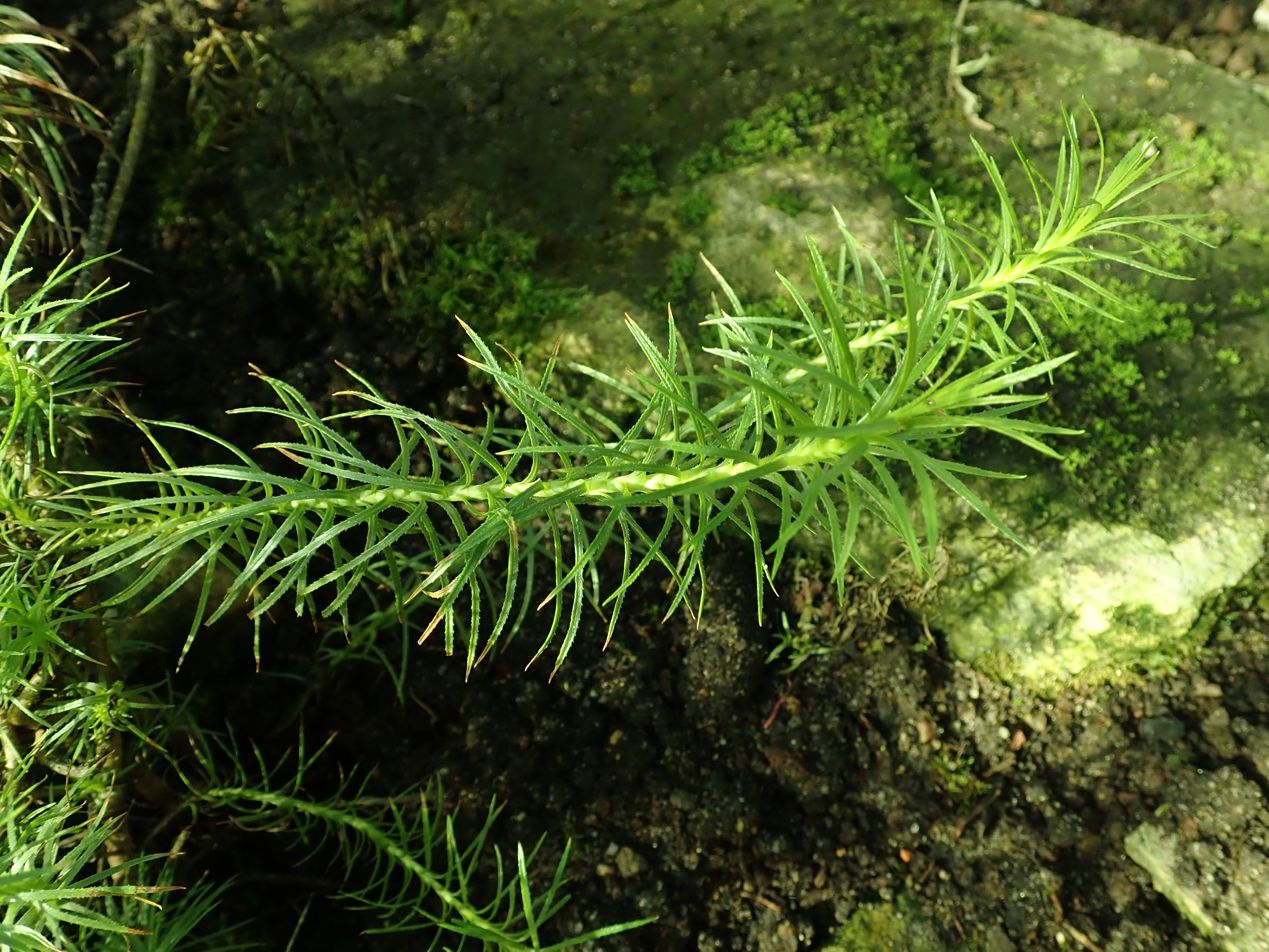
- Fluminaria pinifolia at the Berlin Botanical Garden and Botanical Museum

Scientific classification
- Kingdom: Plantae
- Clade: Embryophytes
- Clade: Tracheophytes
- Clade: Angiosperms
- Clade: Eudicots
- Clade: Asterids
- Order: Asterales
- Family: Asteraceae
- Subfamily: Asteroideae
- Tribe: Gnaphalieae
- Genus: Fluminaria; N.G.Bergh
- Species: F. pinifolia

Binomial name
- Fluminaria pinifolia (N.E.Br.) N.G.Bergh

Synonyms
- Athrixia pinifolia N.E.Br.; Macowania pinifolia (N.E.Br.) Kroner

= Fluminaria =

Genus of flowering plants

Fluminaria is a genus of flowering plants in the family Asteraceae. It has only one currently accepted species, Fluminaria pinifolia, native to Lesotho, and KwaZulu-Natal in South Africa. It prefers to live alongside streams in mountainous areas.
