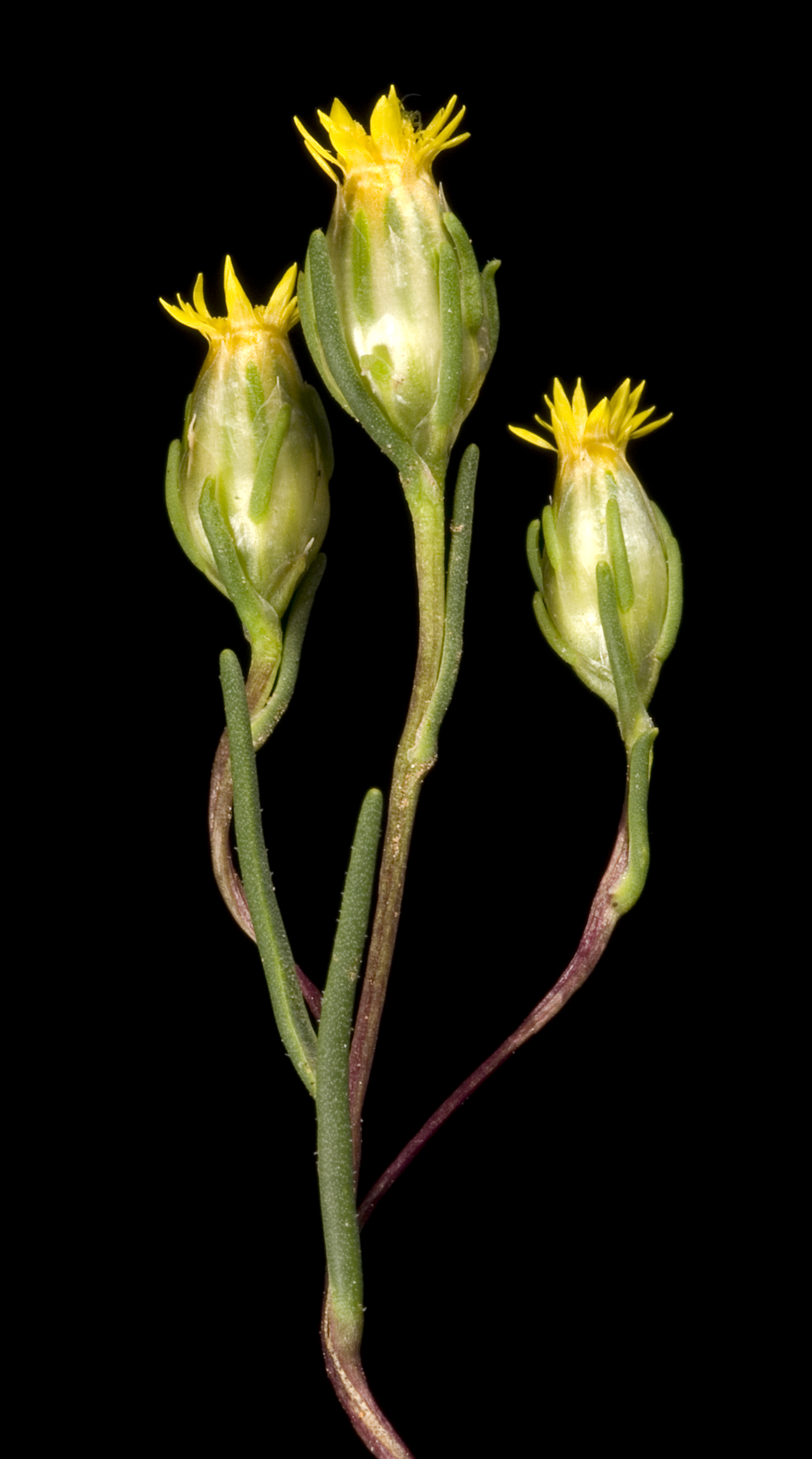
- Erymophyllum tenellum

Scientific classification
- Kingdom: Plantae
- Clade: Tracheophytes
- Clade: Angiosperms
- Clade: Eudicots
- Clade: Asterids
- Order: Asterales
- Family: Asteraceae
- Subfamily: Asteroideae
- Tribe: Gnaphalieae
- Genus: Erymophyllum; Paul G.Wilson

Species
- See tex

= Erymophyllum =

Genus of flowering plants

Erymophyllum is a genus of flowering plants in the family Asteraceae, endemic to Australia.

Species include:

- Erymophyllum glossanthus Paul G.Wilson
- Erymophyllum hemisphaericum Paul G.Wilson
- Erymophyllum ramosum (A.Gray) Paul G.Wilson
- Erymophyllum tenellum (Turcz.) Paul G.Wilson
