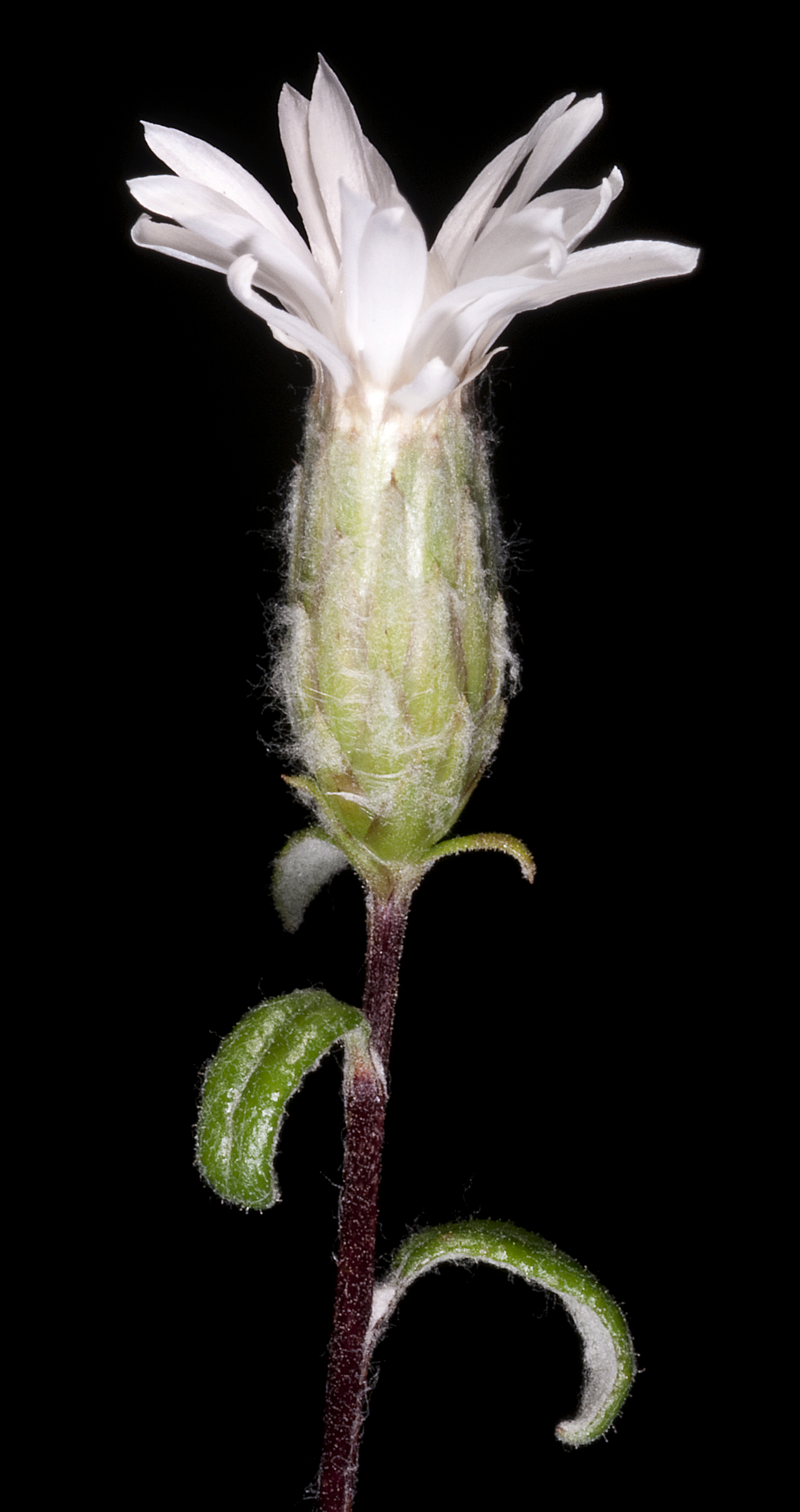

Scientific classification
- Kingdom: Plantae
- Clade: Embryophytes
- Clade: Tracheophytes
- Clade: Angiosperms
- Clade: Eudicots
- Clade: Asterids
- Order: Asterales
- Family: Asteraceae
- Subfamily: Asteroideae
- Tribe: Gnaphalieae
- Genus: Argyroglottis; Turcz.
- Species: A. turbinata

Binomial name
- Argyroglottis turbinata Turcz.

Synonyms
- Helichrysum argyroglottis Benth.; Helichrysum turbinatum (Turcz.) C.Gardner.

= Argyroglottis =

Genus of flowering plants

Argyroglottis is a genus of flowering plants in the family Asteraceae.

The genus is monotypic, that is, there is only one species, Argyroglottis turbinata, which is endemic to Western Australia.
