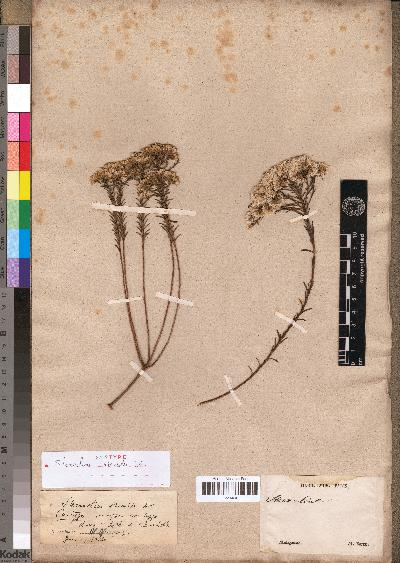
- Stenocline ericoides

Scientific classification
- Kingdom: Plantae
- Clade: Embryophytes
- Clade: Tracheophytes
- Clade: Angiosperms
- Clade: Eudicots
- Clade: Asterids
- Order: Asterales
- Family: Asteraceae
- Subfamily: Asteroideae
- Tribe: Gnaphalieae
- Genus: Stenocline; DC.

= Stenocline =

Genus of plants

Stenocline is a genus of flowering plants in the tribe Gnaphalieae within the family Asteraceae.

Species

- Stenocline chionaea (DC.) DC. - State of Minas Gerais in Brazil
- Stenocline ericoides DC. - Madagascar

formerly included

several species now in Achyrocline or Helichrysum
