= Cuatrecasasiella =

Scientific classification
- Kingdom: Plantae
- Clade: Tracheophytes
- Clade: Angiosperms
- Clade: Eudicots
- Clade: Asterids
- Order: Asterales
- Family: Asteraceae
- Subfamily: Asteroideae
- Tribe: Gnaphalieae
- Genus: Cuatrecasasiella; H.Rob.

Genus of flowering plants

Cuatrecasasiella is a genus of flowering plants in the family Asteraceae, described as a genus in 1986.

The entire genus is native to South America.

Species

- Cuatrecasasiella argentina (Cabrera) H.Rob. - northwest Argentina, northern Chile, Bolivia
- Cuatrecasasiella isernii (Cuatrec.) H.Rob. - Ecuador, Peru
