= Catatia =

Scientific classification
- Kingdom: Plantae
- Clade: Tracheophytes
- Clade: Angiosperms
- Clade: Eudicots
- Clade: Asterids
- Order: Asterales
- Family: Asteraceae
- Subfamily: Asteroideae
- Tribe: Gnaphalieae
- Genus: Catatia; Humbert

Type species
- Catatia attenuata Humbert

Genus of flowering plants

Catatia is a genus of flowering plants in the family Asteraceae.

Species

Both known species are endemic to Madagascar.

- Catatia attenuata Humbert
- Catatia cordata Humbert
