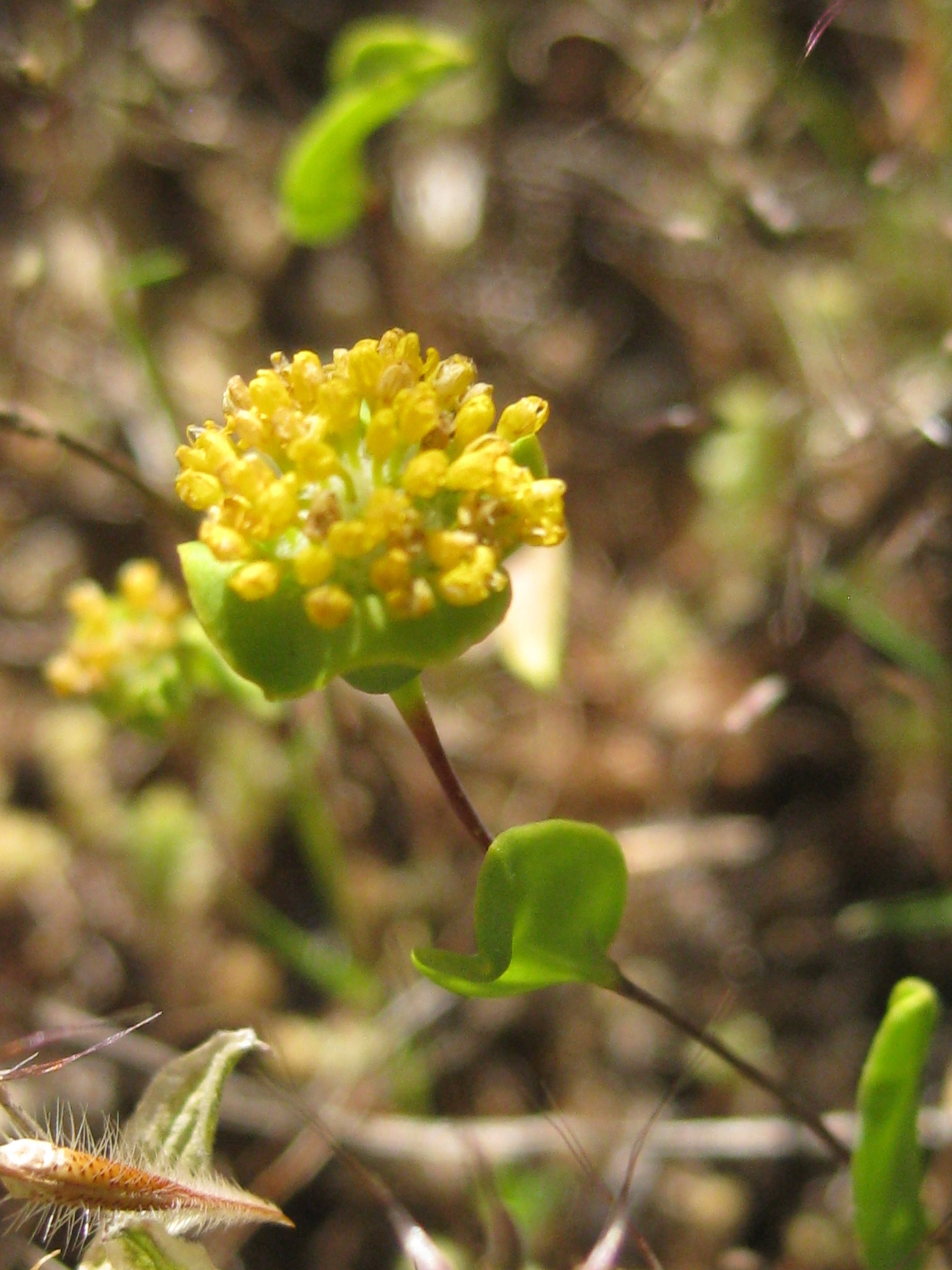
- Dithyrostegia amplexicaulis

Scientific classification
- Kingdom: Plantae
- Clade: Embryophytes
- Clade: Tracheophytes
- Clade: Angiosperms
- Clade: Eudicots
- Clade: Asterids
- Order: Asterales
- Family: Asteraceae
- Subfamily: Asteroideae
- Tribe: Gnaphalieae
- Genus: Dithyrostegia; A.Gray

Type species
- Dithyrostegia amplexicaulis A.Gray

= Dithyrostegia =

Genus of flowering plants

Dithyrostegia is a genus of Australian flowering plants in the family Asteraceae.

Species

- Dithyrostegia amplexicaulis A.Gray - Western Australia
- Dithyrostegia gracilis P.S.Short - Western Australia
