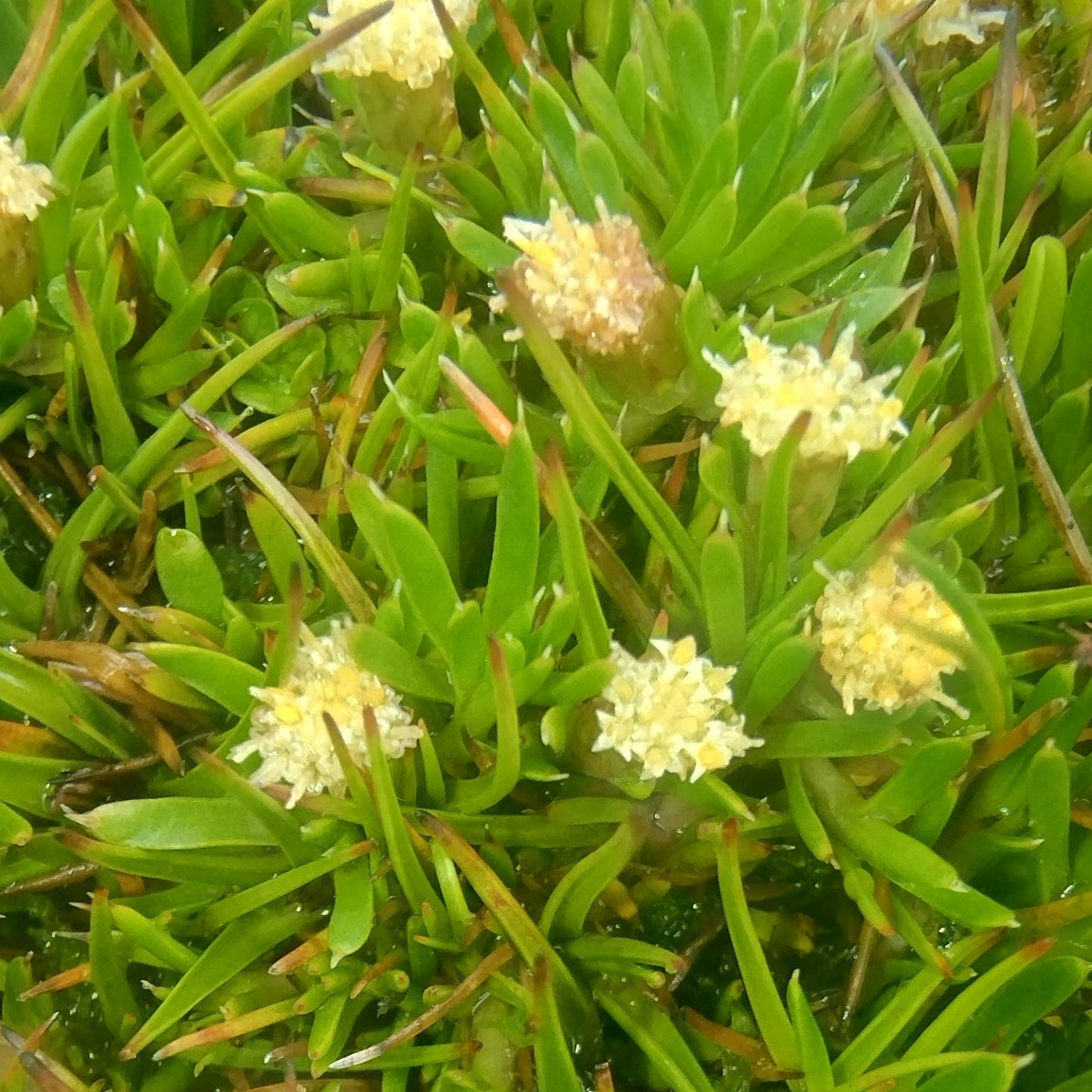

Scientific classification
- Kingdom: Plantae
- Clade: Tracheophytes
- Clade: Angiosperms
- Clade: Eudicots
- Clade: Asterids
- Order: Asterales
- Family: Asteraceae
- Subfamily: Asteroideae
- Tribe: Gnaphalieae
- Genus: Parantennaria; Beauverd
- Species: P. uniceps

Binomial name
- Parantennaria uniceps (F.Muell.) Beauverd

Synonyms
- Antennaria uniceps F.Muell.

= Parantennaria =

Parantennaria uniceps

Genus of flowering plants

Parantennaria is a genus of Australian plants in the tribe Gnaphalieae within the family Asteraceae. It is monotypic, with the only known species Parantennaria uniceps, which is native to Victoria and New South Wales.
