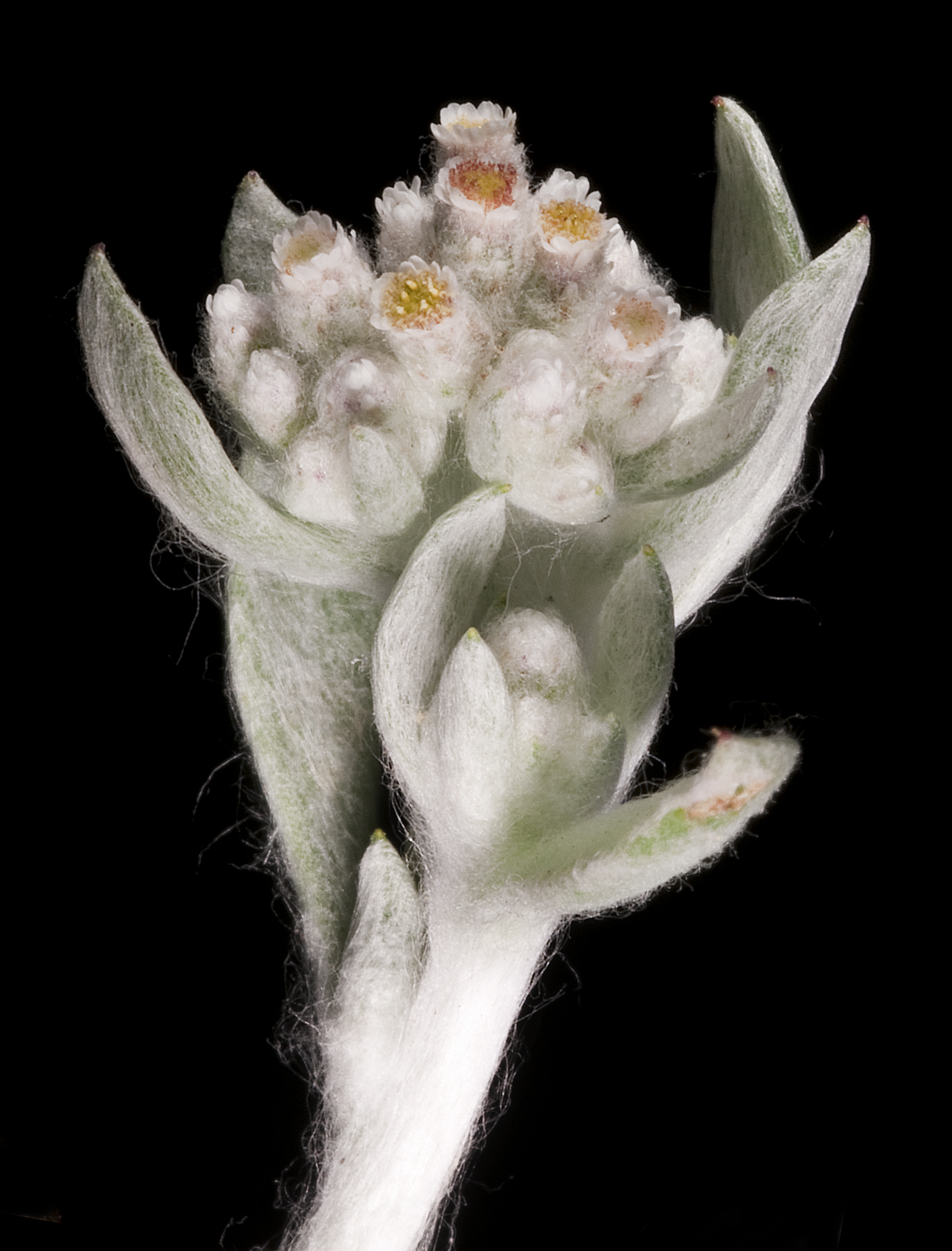
- Vellereophyton dealbatum

Scientific classification
- Kingdom: Plantae
- Clade: Tracheophytes
- Clade: Angiosperms
- Clade: Eudicots
- Clade: Asterids
- Order: Asterales
- Family: Asteraceae
- Subfamily: Asteroideae
- Tribe: Gnaphalieae
- Genus: Vellereophyton; Hilliard & B.L.Burtt

= Vellereophyton =

Genus of flowering plants

Vellereophyton is a genus of flowering plants in the family Asteraceae.

Species

- Vellereophyton dealbatum (Thunb.) Hilliard & B.L.Burtt - Australia
- Vellereophyton felinum Hilliard - South Africa
- Vellereophyton gracillimum Hilliard - South Africa
- Vellereophyton lasianthum (Schltr. & Moeser) Hilliard - South Africa
- Vellereophyton niveum Hilliard - South Africa
- Vellereophyton pulvinatum Hilliard - South Africa
- Vellereophyton vellereum (R.A.Dyer) Hilliard - South Africa
