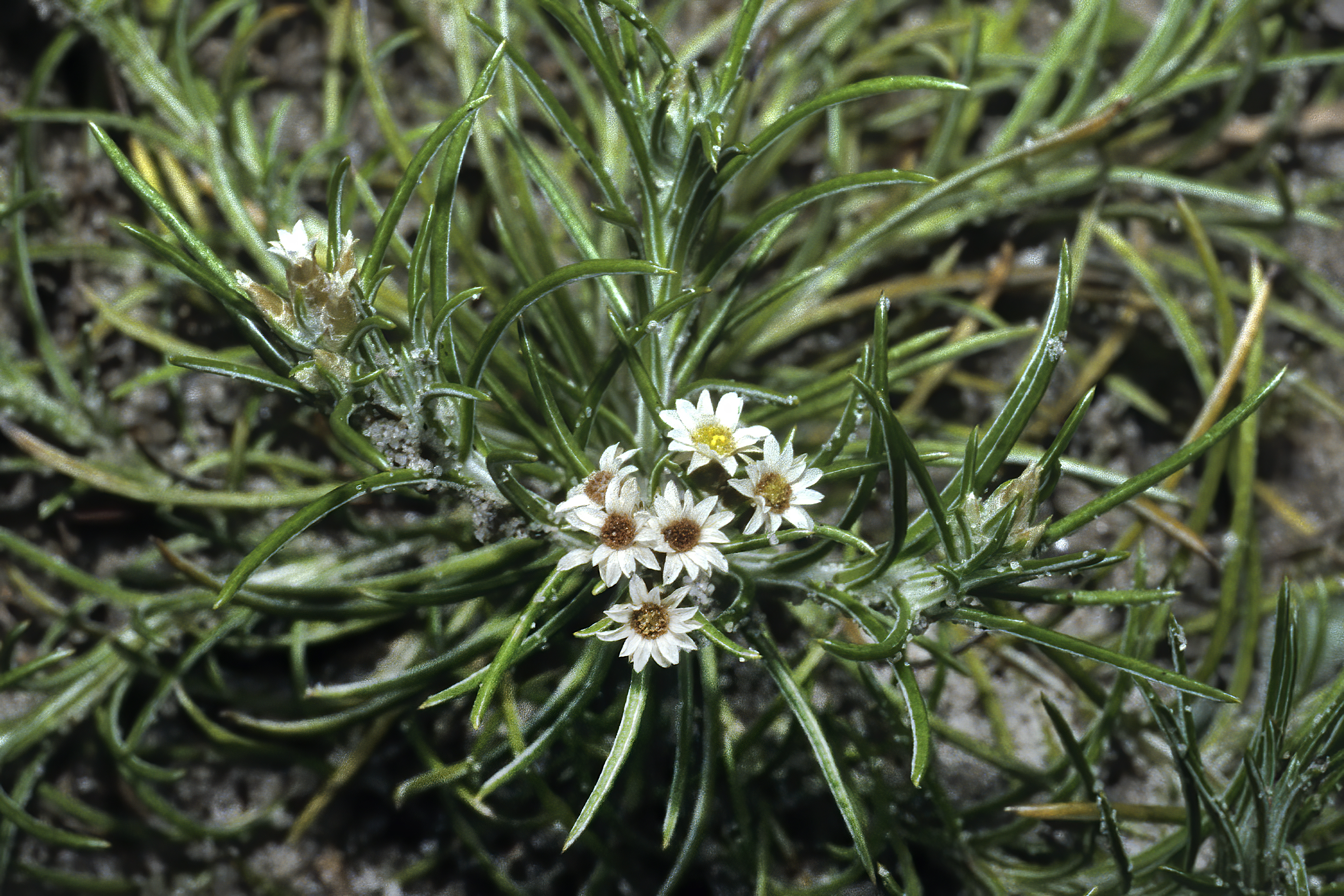
- Helichrysopsis septentrionalis in Sileza Nature Reserve, South Africa

Scientific classification
- Kingdom: Plantae
- Clade: Embryophytes
- Clade: Tracheophytes
- Clade: Angiosperms
- Clade: Eudicots
- Clade: Asterids
- Order: Asterales
- Family: Asteraceae
- Subfamily: Asteroideae
- Tribe: Gnaphalieae
- Genus: Helichrysopsis; Kirp.
- Species: H. septentrionalis

Binomial name
- Helichrysopsis septentrionalis (Vatke) Hilliard

Synonyms
- Anaxeton septentrionale Vatke; Gnaphalium septentrionale (Vatke) Hilliard; Helichrysopsis stenophylla (Oliv. & Hiern) Kirp.; Gnaphalium stenophyllum Oliv. & Hiern

= Helichrysopsis =

Genus of flowering plants

Helichrysopsis is a genus of flowering plants in the family Asteraceae, whose only known species is Helichrysopsis septentrionalis, native to KwaZulu-Natal and southern Mozambique.
