= Stenophalium =

Scientific classification
- Kingdom: Plantae
- Clade: Tracheophytes
- Clade: Angiosperms
- Clade: Eudicots
- Clade: Asterids
- Order: Asterales
- Family: Asteraceae
- Subfamily: Asteroideae
- Tribe: Gnaphalieae
- Genus: Stenophalium; Anderb.

Type species
- Stenophalium chionaeum (DC.) Anderb.

Genus of plants

Stenophalium is a genus of Brazilian plants in the tribe Gnaphalieae within the family Asteraceae.

== Species ==
Species

- Stenophalium almasense D.J.N.Hind - Bahia
- Stenophalium chionaeum (DC.) Anderb. - Minas Gerais, Bahia, Rio de Janeiro
- Stenophalium eriodes (Mattf.) Anderb. - Bahia
- Stenophalium heringeri (H.Rob.) Anderb. - Minas Gerais, D.F., Goiás

== Formerly included ==
- Stenophalium gardneri - Achyrocline gardneri
- Achyrocline
