= Rhetinocarpha =

Scientific classification
- Kingdom: Plantae
- Clade: Tracheophytes
- Clade: Angiosperms
- Clade: Eudicots
- Clade: Asterids
- Order: Asterales
- Family: Asteraceae
- Subfamily: Asteroideae
- Tribe: Gnaphalieae
- Genus: Rhetinocarpha; Paul G.Wilson & M.A.Wilson
- Species: R. suffruticosa

Binomial name
- Rhetinocarpha suffruticosa (Benth.) Paul G.Wilson & M.A.Wilson

Synonyms
- Myriocephalus suffruticosus Benth.; Hirnellia suffruticosa Kuntze

Genus of flowering plants

Rhetinocarpha is a genus of flowering plants in the family Asteraceae. It includes a single species, Rhetinocarpha suffruticosa, which is endemic to Western Australia.

The species was first described as Myriocephalus suffruticosus by George Bentham in 1867. In 2006 Paul Graham Wilson and Margaret Anne Wilson placed the species in the newly described monotypic genus Rhetinocarpha as Rhetinocarpha suffruticosa.
