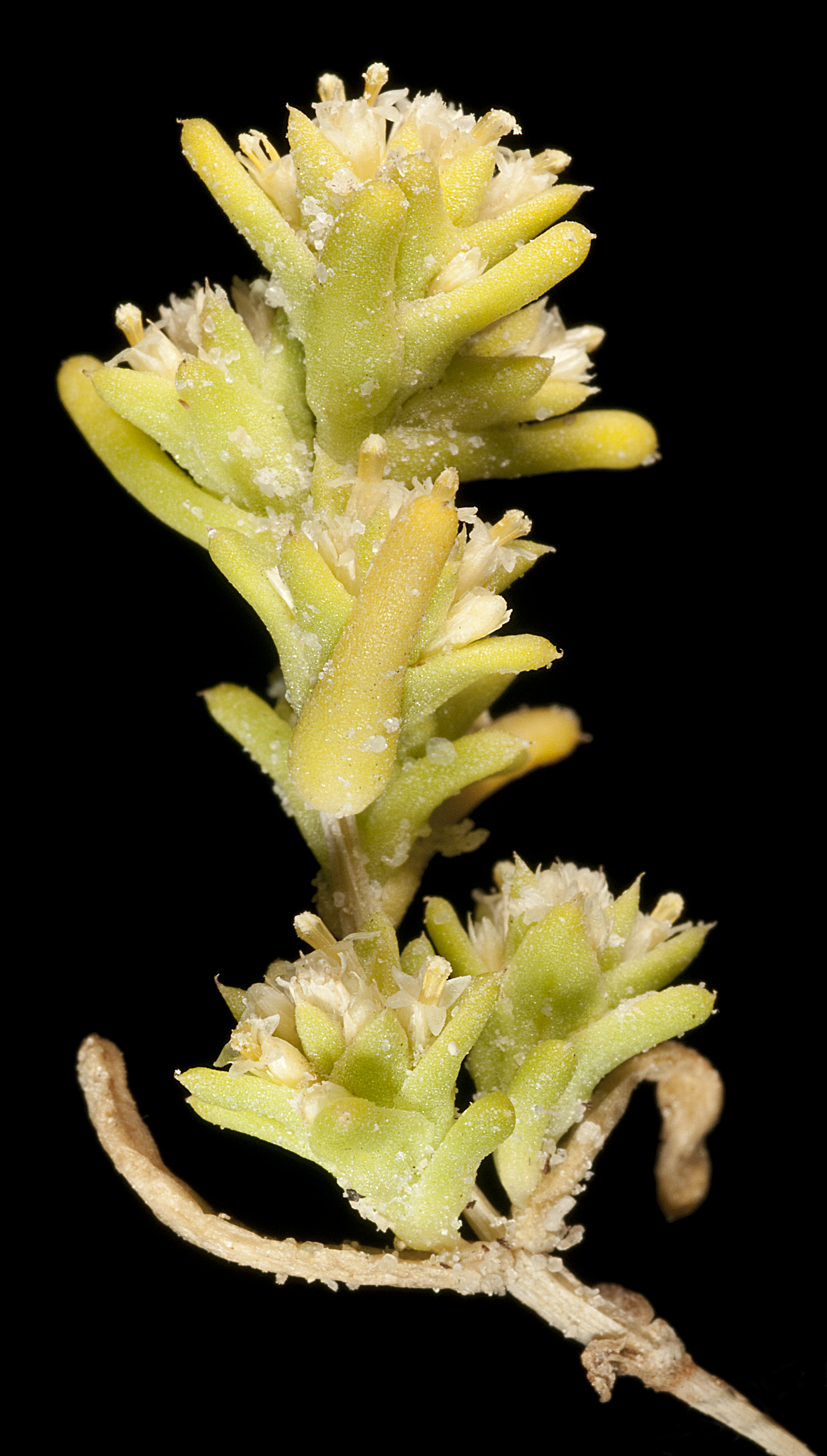

Scientific classification
- Kingdom: Plantae
- Clade: Embryophytes
- Clade: Tracheophytes
- Clade: Angiosperms
- Clade: Eudicots
- Clade: Asterids
- Order: Asterales
- Family: Asteraceae
- Subfamily: Asteroideae
- Tribe: Gnaphalieae
- Genus: Fitzwillia; P.S.Short
- Species: F. axilliflora

Binomial name
- Fitzwillia axilliflora (Ewart & Jean White) P.S.Short

Synonyms
- Angianthus axiliflorus W.Fitzg. ex Ewart & Jean White

= Fitzwillia =

Genus of flowering plants

Fitzwillia is a genus of flowering plants in the family Asteraceae described as a genus in 1989.

There is only one known species, Fitzwillia axilliflora, endemic to Western Australia.
