= Myrovernix =

Scientific classification
- Kingdom: Plantae
- Clade: Tracheophytes
- Clade: Angiosperms
- Clade: Eudicots
- Clade: Asterids
- Order: Asterales
- Family: Asteraceae
- Subfamily: Asteroideae
- Tribe: Gnaphalieae
- Genus: Myrovernix; Koek.

Genus of plants

Myrovernix is a genus of flowering plants belonging to the family Asteraceae.

Its native range is South Africa.

== Species ==
Species:

- Myrovernix glandulosus (Less.) Koek.
- Myrovernix gnaphaloides (L.) Koek.
- Myrovernix intricata (Levyns) Koek.
- Myrovernix longifolius (DC.) Koek.
- Myrovernix scaber (L.f.) Koek.
