= Odixia =

Scientific classification
- Kingdom: Plantae
- Clade: Tracheophytes
- Clade: Angiosperms
- Clade: Eudicots
- Clade: Asterids
- Order: Asterales
- Family: Asteraceae
- Subfamily: Asteroideae
- Tribe: Gnaphalieae
- Genus: Odixia; Orchard

Type species
- Odixia angusta (N.A.Wakef.) Orchard

Genus of flowering plants

Odixia is a genus of Tasmanian flowering plants in the tribe Gnaphalieae within the family Asteraceae.

Species

- Odixia achlaena (D.I.Morris) Orchard - Tasmania
- Odixia angusta (N.A.Wakef.) Orchard - Tasmania
