= Fragmenta phytographiae Australiae =

Series of scientific papers by Ferdinand von Mueller

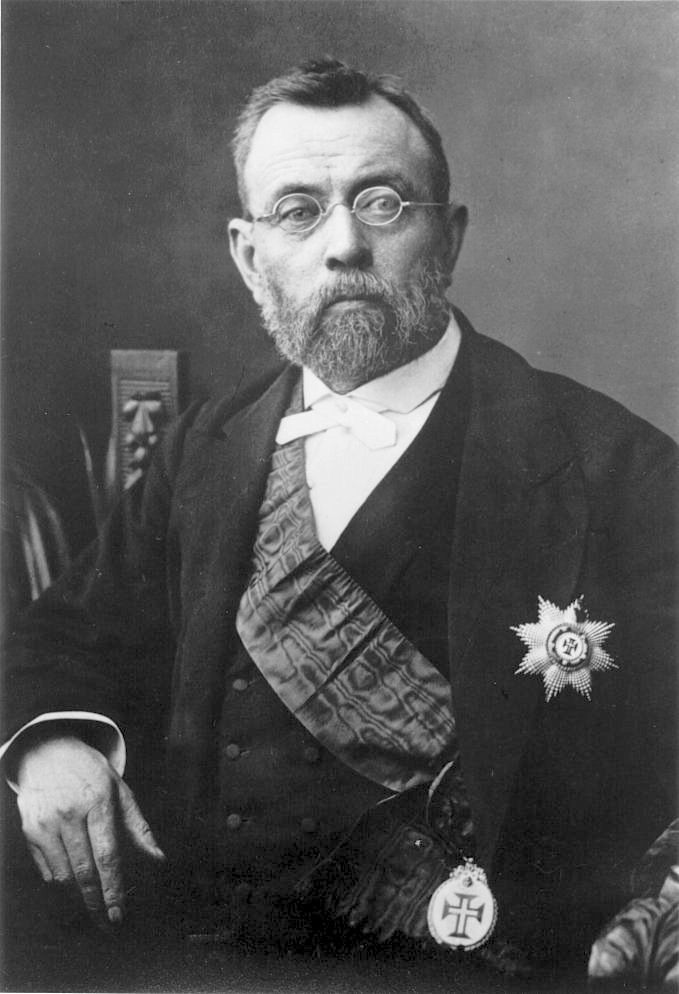
Ferdinand von Mueller

Fragmenta phytographiae Australiae is a series of papers written by the Victorian Government botanist Ferdinand von Mueller in which he published many of his approximately 2000 descriptions of new taxa of Australian plants. It includes the plant genera of Reedia (belonging to the family Cyperaceae), and Acomis (in the daisy family). The papers were issued in 94 parts between 1858 and 1882 and published in 11 volumes. Though a 12th volume was apparently planned, it was not published. It is the only scientific periodical in Australia that has been completely written in Latin.

One of the illustrators of the series was Ludwig Becker.
