= Alatoseta =

Scientific classification
- Kingdom: Plantae
- Clade: Tracheophytes
- Clade: Angiosperms
- Clade: Eudicots
- Clade: Asterids
- Order: Asterales
- Family: Asteraceae
- Subfamily: Asteroideae
- Tribe: Gnaphalieae
- Genus: Alatoseta; Compton
- Species: A. tenuis

Binomial name
- Alatoseta tenuis Compton

Genus of flowering plants

Alatoseta is a genus of flowering plants in the family Asteraceae described as a genus in 1931.

There is only one known species, Alatoseta tenuis, endemic to the Cape Province region of South Africa.
