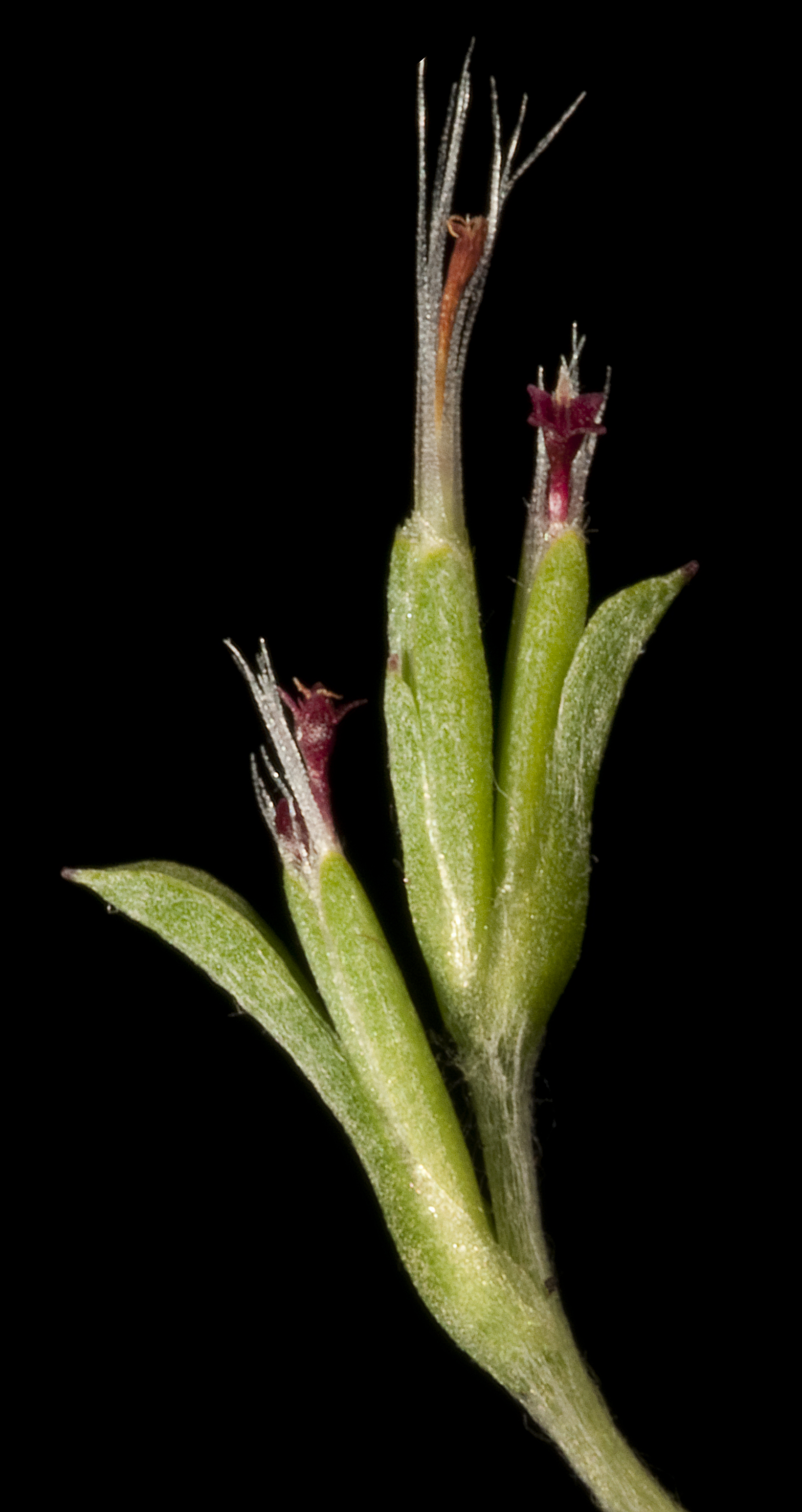

Scientific classification
- Kingdom: Plantae
- Clade: Embryophytes
- Clade: Tracheophytes
- Clade: Angiosperms
- Clade: Eudicots
- Clade: Asterids
- Order: Asterales
- Family: Asteraceae
- Subfamily: Asteroideae
- Tribe: Gnaphalieae
- Genus: Quinetia; Cass.
- Species: Q. urvillei

Binomial name
- Quinetia urvillei Cass.

= Quinetia =

Species of plant in Australia

Quinetia is a genus of flowering plants in the family Asteraceae.

There is only one known species, Quinetia urvillei, native to Australia (Western Australia, South Australia, Victoria).
