= Chiliocephalum =

Scientific classification
- Kingdom: Plantae
- Clade: Tracheophytes
- Clade: Angiosperms
- Clade: Eudicots
- Clade: Asterids
- Order: Asterales
- Family: Asteraceae
- Subfamily: Asteroideae
- Tribe: Gnaphalieae
- Genus: Chiliocephalum; Benth.

Type species
- Chiliocephalum schimperi Benth.

Genus of flowering plants

Chiliocephalum is a genus of Ethiopian flowering plants in the family Asteraceae.

Species

- Chiliocephalum schimperi Benth. - Ethiopia
- Chiliocephalum tegetum Mesfin- Ethiopia
