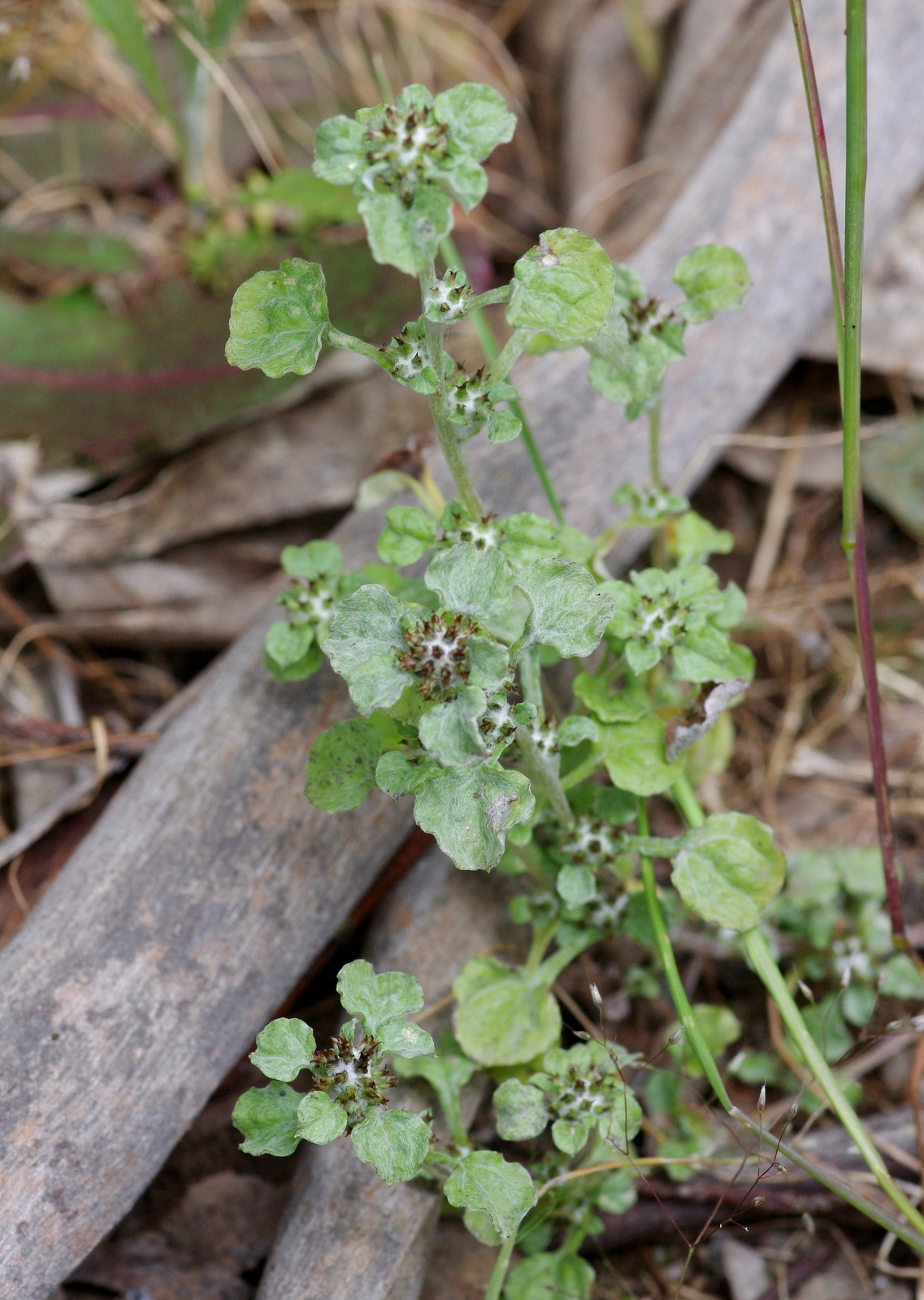

Scientific classification
- Kingdom: Plantae
- Clade: Tracheophytes
- Clade: Angiosperms
- Clade: Eudicots
- Clade: Asterids
- Order: Asterales
- Family: Asteraceae
- Subfamily: Asteroideae
- Tribe: Gnaphalieae
- Genus: Stuartina; Sond.

= Stuartina =

Genus of plants

Stuartina is a genus of small annual herbs in the tribe Gnaphalieae within the family Asteraceae, native to Australia.

Species

- Stuartina hamata Philipson - hooked cudweed or prickly cudweed, native to South Australia, Victoria, New South Wales and Queensland.
- Stuartina muelleri Sond. - spoon cudweed, native to Western Australia, South Australia, Victoria
