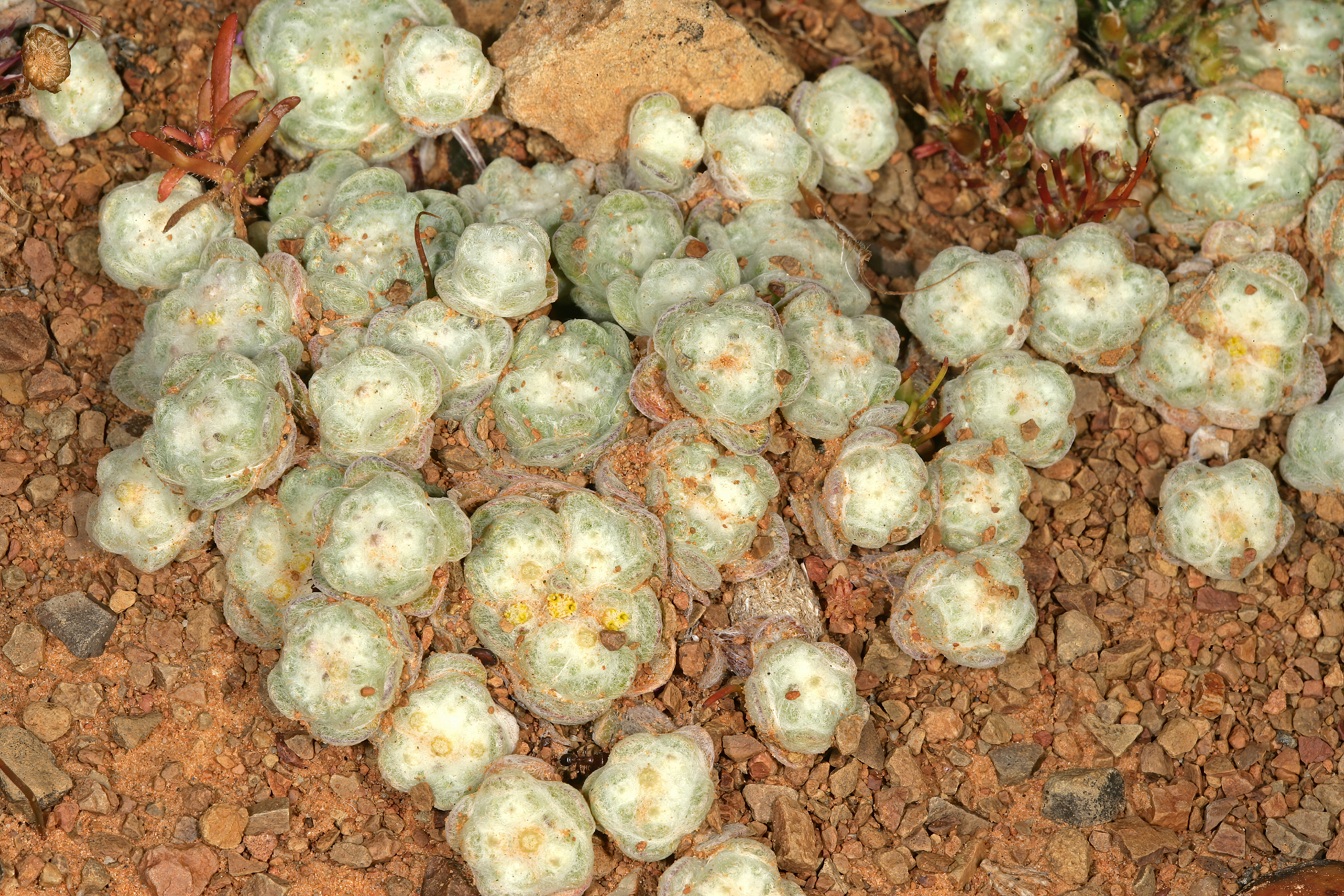

Scientific classification
- Kingdom: Plantae
- Clade: Tracheophytes
- Clade: Angiosperms
- Clade: Eudicots
- Clade: Asterids
- Order: Asterales
- Family: Asteraceae
- Subfamily: Asteroideae
- Tribe: Gnaphalieae
- Genus: Galeomma; Rauschert

Synonyms
- Eriosphaera Less. 1832 illegitimate homonym not F. Dietr. 1817

= Galeomma =

Genus of flowering plants

Galeomma is a genus of African flowering plants in the family Asteraceae.

Species

- Galeomma oculus-cati (L.f.) Rauschert - Cape Provinces
- Galeomma stenolepis (S.Moore) Hilliard - Cape Provinces, Botswana, Namibia
