= Chamaepus =

Scientific classification
- Kingdom: Plantae
- Clade: Tracheophytes
- Clade: Angiosperms
- Clade: Eudicots
- Clade: Asterids
- Order: Asterales
- Family: Asteraceae
- Subfamily: Asteroideae
- Tribe: Gnaphalieae
- Genus: Chamaepus; Wagenitz
- Species: C. afghanicus

Binomial name
- Chamaepus afghanicus Wagenitz

Genus of flowering plants

Chamaepus is a genus of flowering plants belonging to the family Asteraceae. It contains a single species, Chamaepus afghanicus.

Its native range is Afghanistan.
