= Gnaphaliothamnus =

Scientific classification
- Kingdom: Plantae
- Clade: Tracheophytes
- Clade: Angiosperms
- Clade: Eudicots
- Clade: Asterids
- Order: Asterales
- Family: Asteraceae
- Subfamily: Asteroideae
- Tribe: Gnaphalieae
- Genus: Gnaphaliothamnus; Kirp.

Type species
- Gnaphaliothamnus rhodanthum (Sch.Bip.) Kirp.

Genus of plants

Gnaphaliothamnus is a genus of flowering plants in the family Asteraceae.
