= Feldstonia =

Scientific classification
- Kingdom: Plantae
- Clade: Embryophytes
- Clade: Tracheophytes
- Clade: Angiosperms
- Clade: Eudicots
- Clade: Asterids
- Order: Asterales
- Family: Asteraceae
- Subfamily: Asteroideae
- Tribe: Gnaphalieae
- Genus: Feldstonia; P.S.Short
- Species: F. nitens

Binomial name
- Feldstonia nitens P.S.Short

Genus of flowering plants

Feldstonia is a genus of flowering plants in the family Asteraceae described as a genus in 1989.

There is only one known species, Feldstonia nitens, endemic to Western Australia.
