= Sinoleontopodium =

Scientific classification
- Kingdom: Plantae
- Clade: Tracheophytes
- Clade: Angiosperms
- Clade: Eudicots
- Clade: Asterids
- Order: Asterales
- Family: Asteraceae
- Subfamily: Asteroideae
- Tribe: Gnaphalieae
- Genus: Sinoleontopodium; Y.L.Chen
- Species: S. lingianum

Binomial name
- Sinoleontopodium lingianum Y.L.Chen

Genus of plants

Sinoleontopodium is a genus of Tibetan plants in the tribe Gnaphalieae within the family Asteraceae.

Species

The only known species is Sinoleontopodium lingianum, native to Tibet (Xizang Province of China).
