= Chondropyxis =

Scientific classification
- Kingdom: Plantae
- Clade: Tracheophytes
- Clade: Angiosperms
- Clade: Eudicots
- Clade: Asterids
- Order: Asterales
- Family: Asteraceae
- Subfamily: Asteroideae
- Tribe: Gnaphalieae
- Genus: Chondropyxis; D.A.Cooke
- Species: C. halophila

Binomial name
- Chondropyxis halophila D.A.Cooke

Genus of flowering plants

Chondropyxis is a monotypic genus of flowering plants in the family Asteraceae, containing the single species Chondropyxis halophila. It is endemic to Australia, where it is distributed in Western Australia and South Australia. Its common name is salt button-daisy.

This plant is a semi-succulent annual herb growing just a few centimeters tall. It produces yellow-brown flowers. It occurs on the margins of salt lakes in sand and gypsum soils.

This species was described in 1986 from a specimen collected just south of Penong, South Australia.
