= Tietkensia =

Scientific classification
- Kingdom: Plantae
- Clade: Tracheophytes
- Clade: Angiosperms
- Clade: Eudicots
- Clade: Asterids
- Order: Asterales
- Family: Asteraceae
- Subfamily: Asteroideae
- Tribe: Gnaphalieae
- Genus: Tietkensia; P.S.Short
- Species: T. corrickiae

Binomial name
- Tietkensia corrickiae P.S.Short

Genus of plants

Tietkensia is a genus of flowering plants in the family Asteraceae described as a genus in 1990.

There is only one known species, Tietkensia corrickiae, endemic to Australia. It is found in Western Australia, South Australia, and Northern Territory.
