= Haptotrichion =

Scientific classification
- Kingdom: Plantae
- Clade: Tracheophytes
- Clade: Angiosperms
- Clade: Eudicots
- Clade: Asterids
- Order: Asterales
- Family: Asteraceae
- Subfamily: Asteroideae
- Tribe: Gnaphalieae
- Genus: Haptotrichion; Paul G.Wilson

Genus of plants

Haptotrichion is a genus of Australian plants in the tribe Gnaphalieae within the family Asteraceae.

Species

- Haptotrichion colwillii Paul G.Wilson - Western Australia
- Haptotrichion conicum (B.L.Turner) Paul G.Wilson - Western Australia
