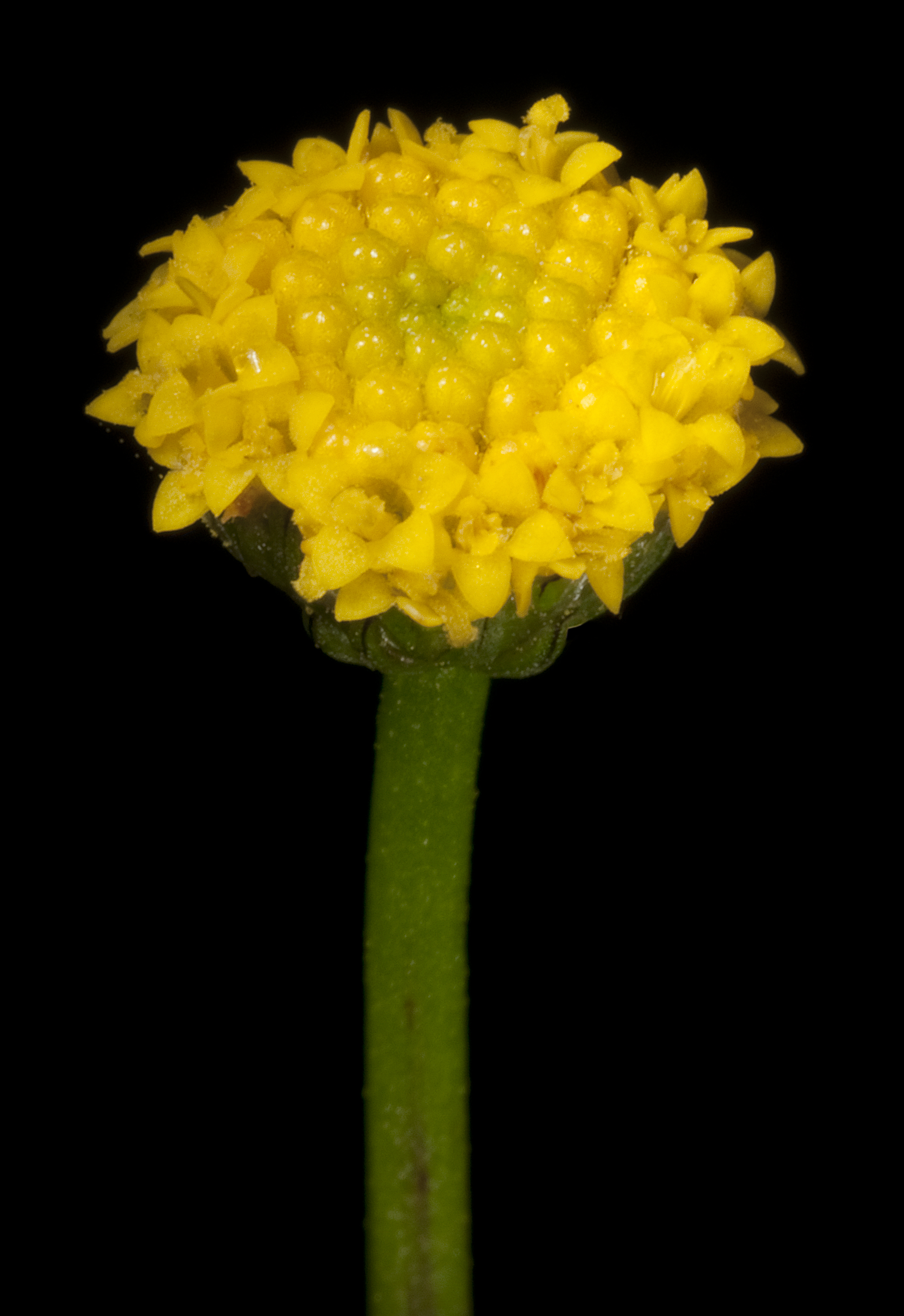

Scientific classification
- Kingdom: Plantae
- Clade: Tracheophytes
- Clade: Angiosperms
- Clade: Eudicots
- Clade: Asterids
- Order: Asterales
- Family: Asteraceae
- Subfamily: Asteroideae
- Tribe: Gnaphalieae
- Genus: Bellida; Ewart
- Species: B. graminea

Binomial name
- Bellida graminea Ewart

= Bellida =

Genus of flowering plants

Bellida is a monotypic genus of flowering plants in the aster family, Asteraceae, containing the single species Bellida graminea. It is native to Western Australia. Its common name is rosy bellida.
