= Sondottia =

Scientific classification
- Kingdom: Plantae
- Clade: Tracheophytes
- Clade: Angiosperms
- Clade: Eudicots
- Clade: Asterids
- Order: Asterales
- Family: Asteraceae
- Subfamily: Asteroideae
- Tribe: Gnaphalieae
- Genus: Sondottia; P.S.Short

Type species
- Sondottia connata P.S.Short

Genus of plants

Sondottia is a genus of Australian plants in the tribe Gnaphalieae within the family Asteraceae, first described by Philip Sydney Short in 1989.

Species

- Sondottia connata (W.Fitzg.) P.S.Short - Western Australia
- Sondottia glabrata P.S.Short - Western Australia
