= Taplinia =

Scientific classification
- Kingdom: Plantae
- Clade: Tracheophytes
- Clade: Angiosperms
- Clade: Eudicots
- Clade: Asterids
- Order: Asterales
- Family: Asteraceae
- Subfamily: Asteroideae
- Tribe: Gnaphalieae
- Genus: Taplinia; Lander
- Species: T. saxatilis

Binomial name
- Taplinia saxatilis Lander

Genus of plants

Taplinia is a genus of plants in the family Asteraceae.

There is only one known species, Taplinia saxatilis, endemic to Western Australia.
