= Neotysonia =

Scientific classification
- Kingdom: Plantae
- Clade: Tracheophytes
- Clade: Angiosperms
- Clade: Eudicots
- Clade: Asterids
- Order: Asterales
- Family: Asteraceae
- Subfamily: Asteroideae
- Tribe: Gnaphalieae
- Genus: Neotysonia; Dalla Torre & Harms
- Species: N. phyllostegia

Binomial name
- Neotysonia phyllostegia (F.Muell.) Dalla Torre & Harms

Synonyms
- Tysonia F.Muell. 1896, illegitimate homonym not Bolus 1890 (Boraginaceae); Tysonia phyllostegia F.Muell.; Swinburnia phyllostegia (F.Muell.) Ewart

Genus of flowering plants

Neotysonia is a genus of Australian plants in tribe Gnaphalieae within the family Asteraceae.

Species

The only known species is Neotysonia phyllostegia, native to Western Australia.
