= Cephalosorus =

Scientific classification
- Kingdom: Plantae
- Clade: Tracheophytes
- Clade: Angiosperms
- Clade: Eudicots
- Clade: Asterids
- Order: Asterales
- Family: Asteraceae
- Subfamily: Asteroideae
- Tribe: Gnaphalieae
- Genus: Cephalosorus; A.Gray
- Species: C. carpesioides

Binomial name
- Cephalosorus carpesioides (Turcz.) P.S.Short

Synonyms
- Piptostemma Turcz.; Piptostemma carpesioides Turcz.; Angianthus phyllocephalus (A.Gray) Benth.; Cephalosorus brevipapposus F.Muell.; Styloncerus phyllocephalus (A.Gray) Kuntze; Cephalosorus phyllocephalus A.Gray

Genus of flowering plants

Cephalosorus is a genus of flowering plants in the family Asteraceae.

There is only one known species, Cephalosorus carpesioides, endemic to Western Australia.
