= Oxylaena =

Scientific classification
- Kingdom: Plantae
- Clade: Tracheophytes
- Clade: Angiosperms
- Clade: Eudicots
- Clade: Asterids
- Order: Asterales
- Family: Asteraceae
- Subfamily: Asteroideae
- Tribe: Calenduleae
- Genus: Oxylaena; Benth. ex Anderb.
- Species: O. acicularis

Binomial name
- Oxylaena acicularis (Benth.) Anderb. 1991

Synonyms
- Oxylaena Benth. 1876, name suggested as synonym, not accepted by author hence not validly published; Anaglypha acicularis Benth.

Genus of flowering plants

Oxylaena is a genus of flowering plants in the family Asteraceae. It has been placed in the tribe Calenduleae. The only known species is Oxylaena acicularis, native to the Cape Provinces of South Africa.
