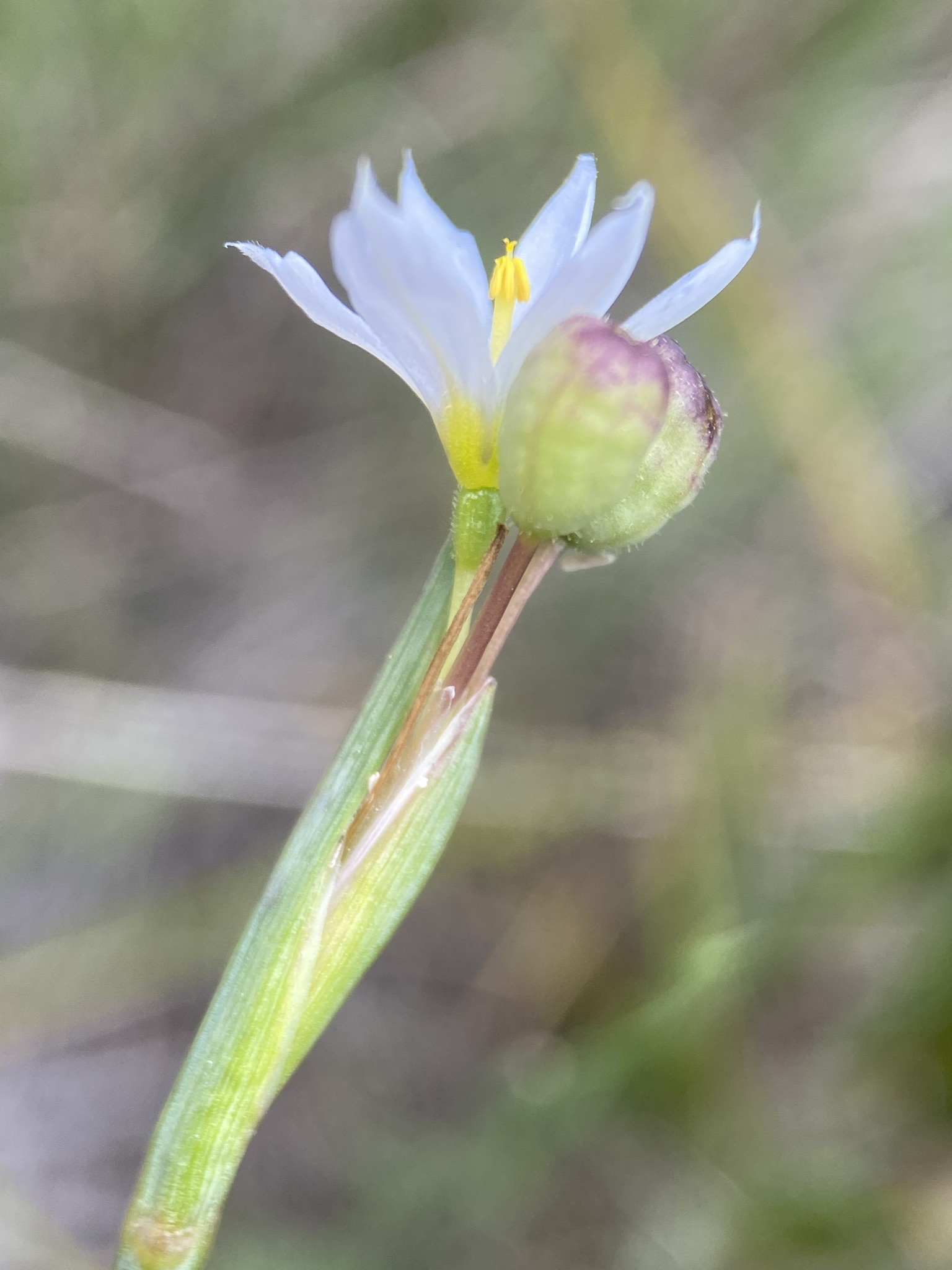

Conservation status
- Vulnerable (NatureServe)

Scientific classification
- Kingdom: Plantae
- Clade: Tracheophytes
- Clade: Angiosperms
- Clade: Monocots
- Order: Asparagales
- Family: Iridaceae
- Genus: Sisyrinchium
- Species: S. pallidum

Binomial name
- Sisyrinchium pallidum Cholewa & Douglass M.Hend.

= Sisyrinchium pallidum =

Plant species in the iris family

Sisyrinchium pallidum, more commonly known as pale blue-eyed grass, is a species of blue-eyed grass in the iris family. It is a small plant that lacks woody parts and grows in constantly wet meadows and fens in the mountains of Colorado and Wyoming. It is a rare species and is vulnerable to development of its required habitat type.

== Description ==
Pale blue-eyed grass is a small herbaceous plant that resembles grass, though it is not closely related to any of the true grasses. Plants may reach 30 centimeters (12 in) in height and grow in clumps of tightly bunched leaves and stems. The stems do not branch, are hairless, and are 1 to 2 millimeters wide. The many roots are fibrous.

The leaves are shorter than the stems, reaching a maximum of just 25 cm. Their edges are smooth and the width is 1.3 to 2.6 millimeters. The color of the plant is green when growing and olive when dry.

The inflorescence is at the end of the stem with one to five flowers on slender, normally hairless pedicels. The six tepals are delicate, pale blue with yellow bases. The pedicels emerge from two spathes at the end of the stem, the outer one 28–38 mm long and the inner one 7–26 mm longer. Flowering is in midsummer.

The fruit is a round capsule 3–5 millimeters in diameter and beige to dark-brown. The seeds are very small, averaging just 1 mm. They are black with a granular surface.

It is very similar to two other species found in its range, Sisyrinchium montanum and Sisyrinchium idahoense. It is most easily distinguished from these by the light color of its flowers in comparison to the dark blue of its relatives. The habitat where it is found also strongly differentiates them with S. pallidum only found in continually wet places.

== Taxonomy ==
Sisyrinchium pallidum was scientifically described and named by Anita F. Cholewa and Douglass Miles Henderson in 1984. It is classified in the Sisyrinchium genus in the family Iridaceae. It has no subspecies, varieties, or synonyms. It is a octoploid species (n = 32), separating it from Sisyrinchium septentrionale, a tetraploid and Sisyrinchium montanum, a duodecaploid. The type specimen described was collected in Park County, Colorado at Antero Reservoir. Previous collections of the species were made by other botanists, but they were labeled as S. montanum.

=== Names ===
In English it is known by the common name pale blue-eyed grass.

== Range and habitat ==
Sisyrinchium pallidum is a regional endemic limited to rare habitats in the northern mountains of Colorado and southeastern Wyoming. In Colorado it grows in Larimer and Park counties. In Wyoming it grows in Albany County. It grows at elevations of 2,600 to 3,000 meters (8,500 to 9,800 ft).

Unlike other blue-eyed grasses, which grow in areas that dry out over the course of the summer, pale blue-eyed grass grows in constantly moist areas that drain poorly. They are associated with species such as scalloped leaved lousewort (Pedicularis crenulata), prairie shooting star (Primula pauciflora), and silvery primrose (Primula incana).

=== Conservation ===
In 2010 NatureServe evaluated Sisyrinchium pallidum and rated it as vulnerable (G3) at the global level and also in both Wyoming and Colorado. It may be increasing in some parts of Wyoming due to hay meadows being flood irrigated by land managers, but it is threatened in other areas by development. There are approximately 70 populations of the species.

In Colorado pale blue-eyed grass is protected by The Nature Conservancy in the High Creek Fen south of Fairplay.
