= White-eyed grass =

Plant set index article

White-eyed grass is a common name for at least two species of plants:

- Sisyrinchium albidum, a species of flowering plant in the family Iridaceae
- Sisyrinchium campestre, a small herbaceous perennial plant in the iris family
