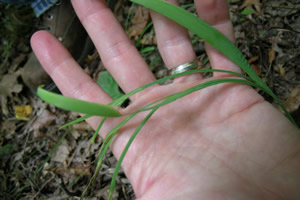

Conservation status
- Imperiled (NatureServe)

Scientific classification
- Kingdom: Plantae
- Clade: Tracheophytes
- Clade: Angiosperms
- Clade: Monocots
- Order: Asparagales
- Family: Iridaceae
- Genus: Sisyrinchium
- Species: S. dichotomum

Binomial name
- Sisyrinchium dichotomum E.P.Bicknell

= Sisyrinchium dichotomum =

Species of flowering plant

Sisyrinchium dichotomum is a rare species of flowering plant in the iris family known by the common names wishbone blue-eyed grass, white irisette, and reflexed blue-eyed grass. It is native to North Carolina and South Carolina in the United States, where fewer than ten populations remain in four counties. It is threatened by the loss and degradation of its habitat and is a federally listed endangered species of the United States.

This plant is a perennial herb producing a clump of branching stems up to 40 centimeters tall with grasslike leaves. The solitary flower has six white tepals with yellow bases, each measuring up to 0.75 centimeters. The fruit is a spherical capsule roughly 0.2 to 0.3 centimeters long.

This species occurs in the Piedmont of North Carolina in Henderson, Polk, and Rutherford Counties, its distribution extending into Greenville County, South Carolina. There are about 30 occurrences making up 5 to 7 populations, the largest of which contains about 1000 individuals. The plant is limited to basic soils in clearings or the edges of wooded areas where there is little canopy cover. It grows in spots where there is thin or no leaf litter as well.

Many of the populations are threatened. They occur in areas that suffer disturbance, such as roadsides and cleared areas around power lines, and one is on private land slated to be cleared for construction. Two of the 30 occurrences are protected within Chimney Rock State Park.

Besides the threat of outright destruction through human activity, the plant faces other problems, including its habitat being seized by the invasion of introduced species of plants such as kudzu (Pueraria lobata) "the vine that ate the south", Japanese honeysuckle (Lonicera japonica), and Nepalese browntop (Microstegium vimineum). Though the plant can be damaged during disturbance in its habitat, it is adapted to some natural forms of disturbance, such as wildfire. A natural fire regime maintains the open clearings and thin litter layer that the plant requires. Other threats include herbicide use and erosion.

Although the plant was considered "fairly common" as recently as 1942, human activity has since made its habitat unsuitable throughout most of its range.
