= Pale blue-eyed grass =

Pale blue-eyed grass is a common name for several plants and may refer to:

- Sisyrinchium pallidum, native to Colorado and Wyoming
- Sisyrinchium sarmentosum, native to Oregon and Washington
