= Golden eye-grass =

Golden eye-grass is a common name for several plants and may refer to:

- Curculigo orchioides, a flowering plant species
- Sisyrinchium californicum, a flowering plant species
