= Platense =

Platense may refer to:

- Club Atlético Platense, a football club based in Florida, Buenos Aires, Argentina
- Club Atlético Platense (Uruguay), a football club based in Montevideo, Uruguay
- Platense F.C., a football club based in Puerto Cortés, Cortés, Honduras
- C.D. Platense Municipal Zacatecoluca, a football club based in Zacatecoluca, La Paz, El Salvador
- Platense, a demonym for the city of La Plata, Buenos Aires, Argentina
- Platense, a demonym for the Río de la Plata Basin of Argentina and Uruguay
- Sisyrinchium platense, a flowering plant of family Iridaceae

== See also ==
- Rioplatense Spanish, a dialect spoken in the Río de la Plata Basin
