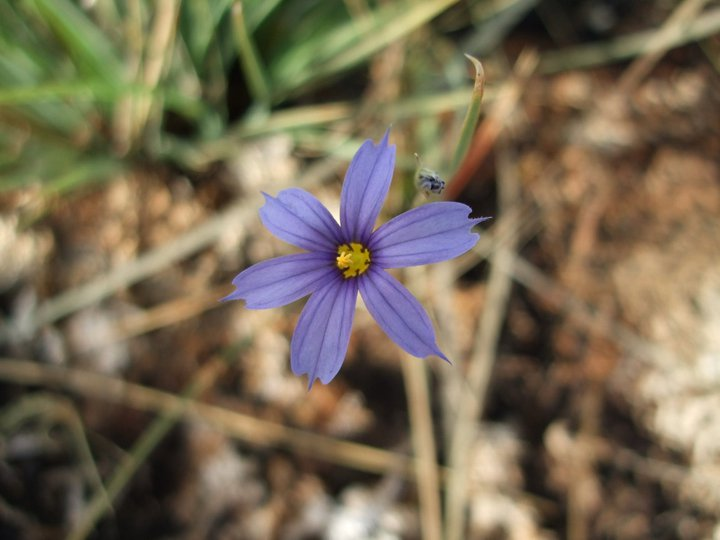

Conservation status
- Imperiled (NatureServe)

Scientific classification
- Kingdom: Plantae
- Clade: Tracheophytes
- Clade: Angiosperms
- Clade: Monocots
- Order: Asparagales
- Family: Iridaceae
- Genus: Sisyrinchium
- Species: S. funereum

Binomial name
- Sisyrinchium funereum E.P.Bicknell

= Sisyrinchium funereum =

Species of flowering plant

Sisyrinchium funereum is an uncommon species of flowering plant in the family Iridaceae known by the common names Funeral Mountain blue-eyed grass and Death Valley blue-eyed-grass. It is endemic to the Mojave Desert of the United States, where it is known only from the Funeral Mountains and Death Valley area in eastern California, and the Ash Meadows area just over the border in Nevada. It grows in wet, highly alkaline habitat, such as seeps and mineral springs.

== Description ==
Sisyrinchium funereum is rhizomatous perennial herb takes a clumpy form, producing pale green, waxy stems up to 70 to 76 centimeters in maximum height. The flower has six tepals measuring up to 1.5 centimeters long. They are light blue to purple-blue with yellow bases. The tepal tips are often squared or notched. The fruit is a beige capsule.
