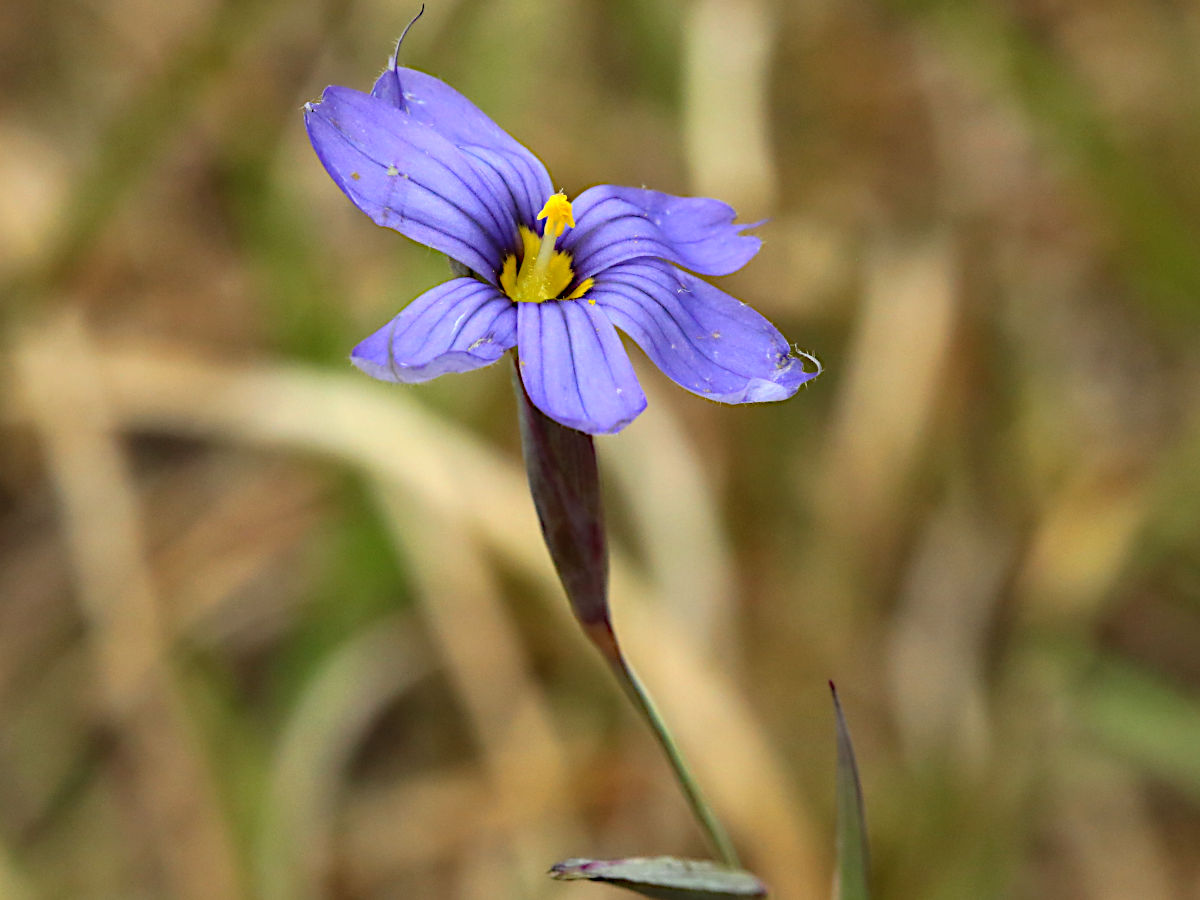

Scientific classification
- Kingdom: Plantae
- Clade: Tracheophytes
- Clade: Angiosperms
- Clade: Monocots
- Order: Asparagales
- Family: Iridaceae
- Genus: Sisyrinchium
- Species: S. atlanticum

Binomial name
- Sisyrinchium atlanticum E.P.Bicknell

= Sisyrinchium atlanticum =

Species of flowering plant

Sisyrinchium atlanticum, the eastern blue-eyed grass or Atlantic blue-eyed-grass, is a species of flowering plant in the family Iridaceae.

== Habitat ==
The preferred habitat is moist sandy shores and grasslands.

== Range ==
The species is found in eastern North America, from Maine south to Florida and Mississippi.
