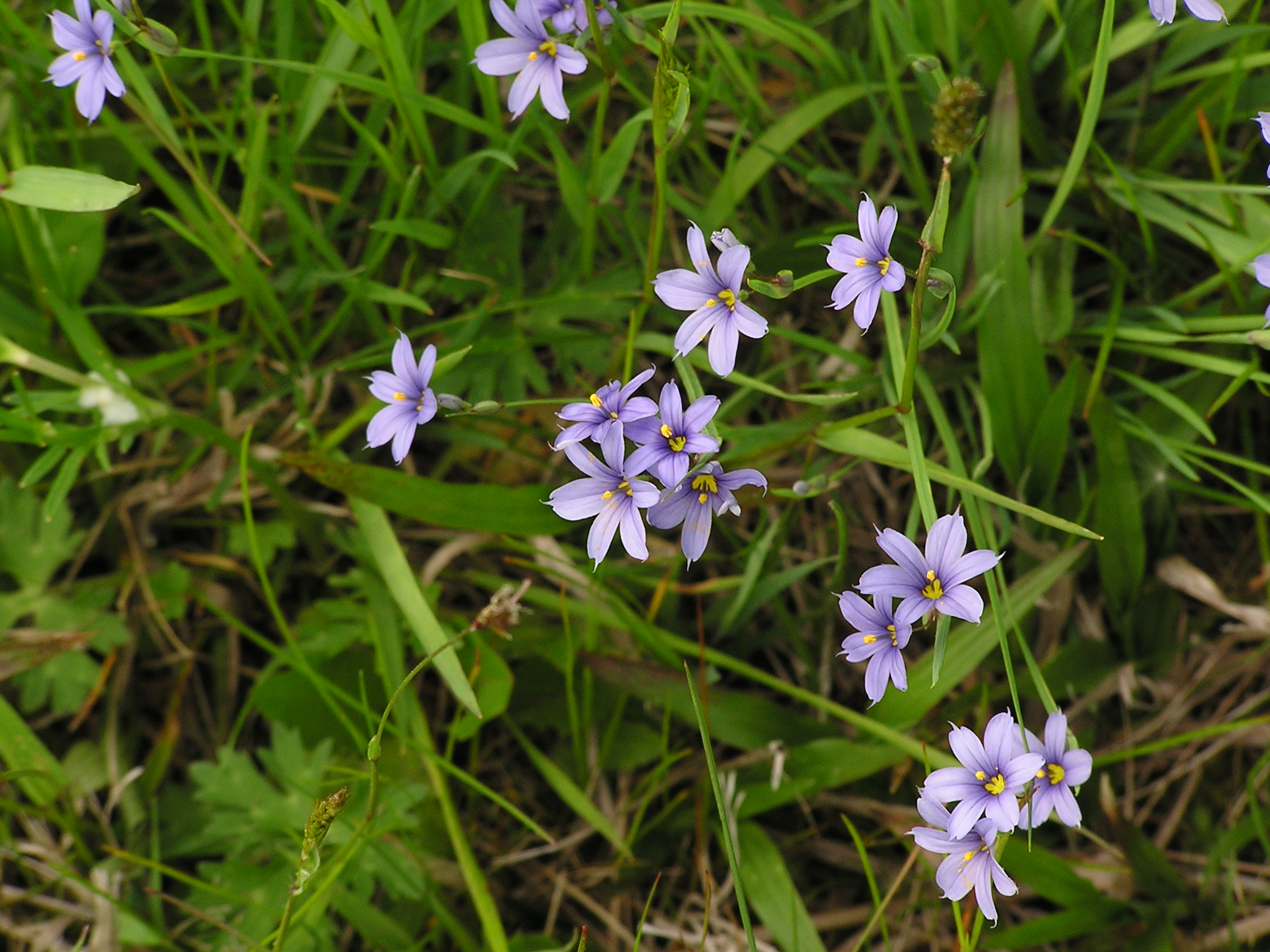

Conservation status
- Secure (NatureServe)

Scientific classification
- Kingdom: Plantae
- Clade: Tracheophytes
- Clade: Angiosperms
- Clade: Monocots
- Order: Asparagales
- Family: Iridaceae
- Genus: Sisyrinchium
- Species: S. montanum

Binomial name
- Sisyrinchium montanum Greene, 1899

Varieties
- S. montanum var. crebrum Fernald; S. montanum var. montanum

Synonyms
- Sisyrinchium alpestre E.P.Bicknell (1899); Sisyrinchium heterocarpum E.P.Bicknell (1899)

= Sisyrinchium montanum =

North American plant species in the iris family

Sisyrinchium montanum, the blue-eyed-grass, American blue-eyed-grass, or strict blue-eyed grass, is a grass-like species of plant from the genus Sisyrinchium, native to northern North America from Newfoundland west to easternmost Alaska, and south to Pennsylvania in the east, and to New Mexico in the Rocky Mountains. It has also been introduced to parts of France, likely during the First World War.

It is very similar to S. angustifolium, with which it is sometimes combined.

== Description ==
Sisyrinchium montanum is a herbaceous perennial plant that grows in clumps between 10 and 50 cm (4 and 20 in) tall. Its stems have wings with entire to finely toothed margins. The leaves and stem are slender, 3 mm (1/8 in) broad, green or brownish, with sharp edges and a fine point.

The flowers are produced in a small cyme of two to five together emerging from a spathe, each flower about 2 cm (3/4 in) diameter, with six purplish tepals with a yellowish base and yellow stamens. The fruit is a capsule 4.5–6 mm (0.18–0.24 in) long, containing numerous small black seeds.

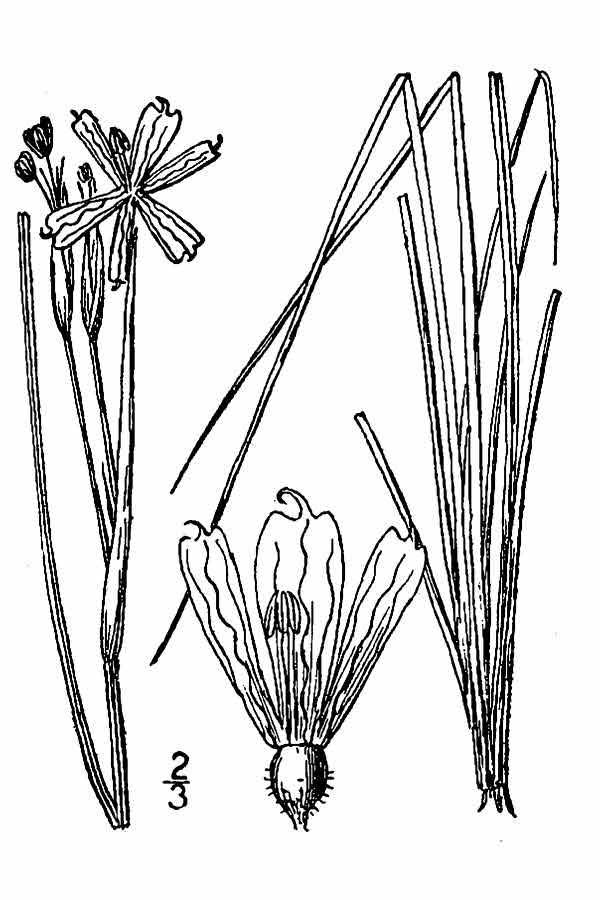

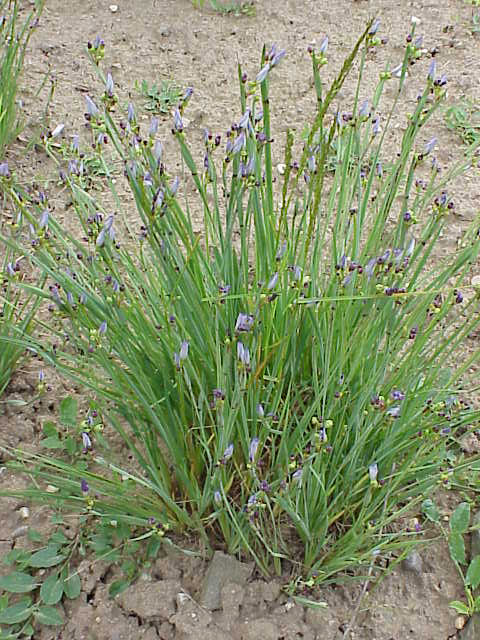

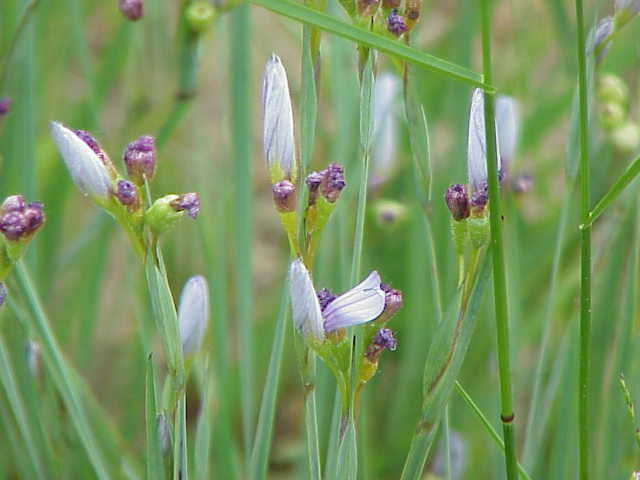
closed flowers or buds
