= Sisyrinchium longipes =

Scientific classification
- Kingdom: Plantae
- Clade: Tracheophytes
- Clade: Angiosperms
- Clade: Monocots
- Order: Asparagales
- Family: Iridaceae
- Genus: Sisyrinchium
- Species: S. longipes

Binomial name
- Sisyrinchium longipes (Bickn.) Kearney & Peebles

Synonyms
- Hydastylus longipes Bickn.

Species of herb

Sisyrinchium longipes, called the timberland blue-eyed grass, is a small herb native to Arizona, California and Chihuahua. It is an erect perennial up to 50 cm tall, with yellow to orange flowers, very often with prominent brown veins. It generally occurs in moist meadows, streambanks or pools in coniferous woods.
