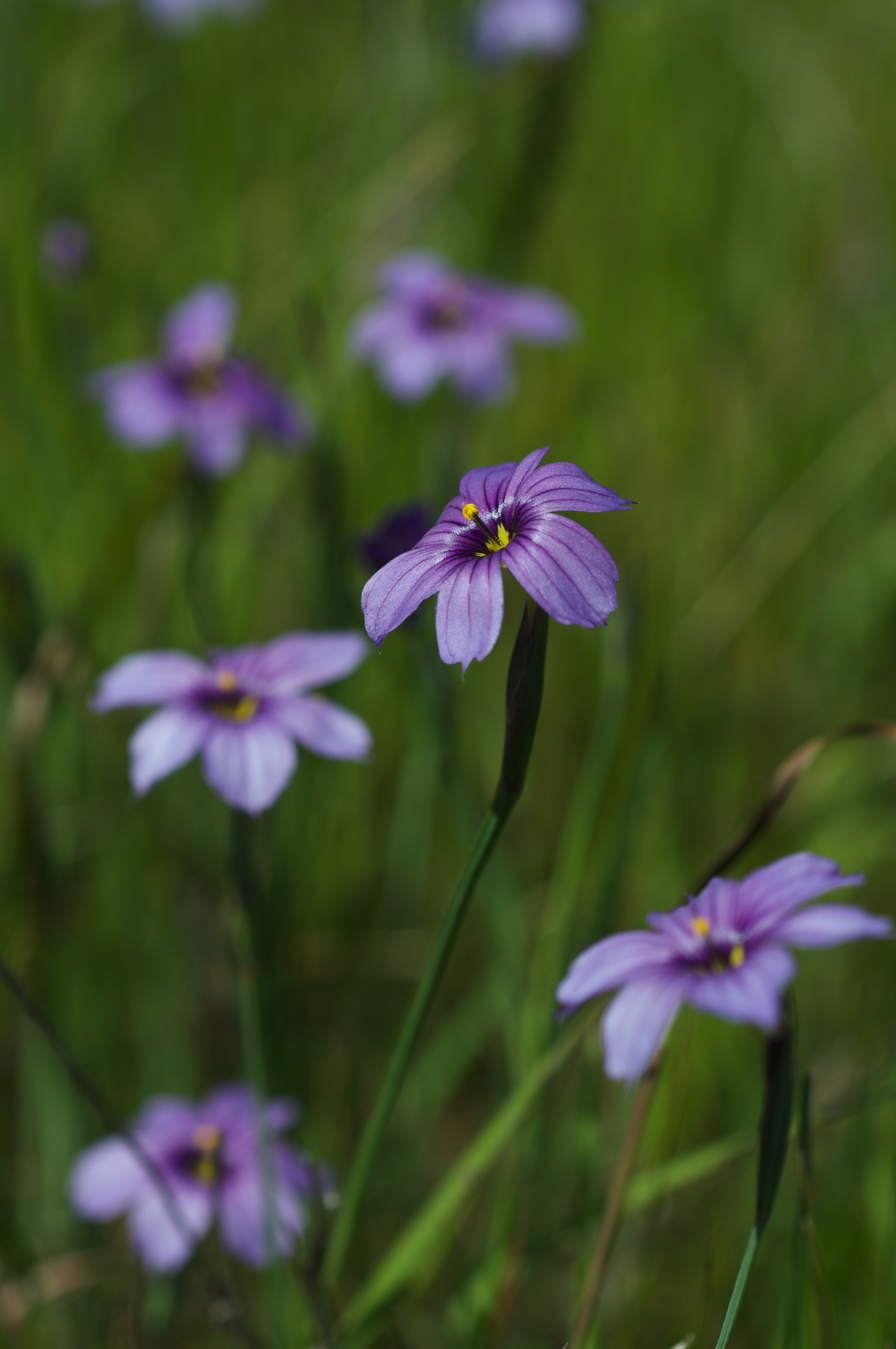

Scientific classification
- Kingdom: Plantae
- Clade: Embryophytes
- Clade: Tracheophytes
- Clade: Angiosperms
- Clade: Monocots
- Order: Asparagales
- Family: Iridaceae
- Genus: Sisyrinchium
- Species: S. bellum

Binomial name
- Sisyrinchium bellum S.Watson

Synonyms
- Bermudiana bella (S.Watson) Greene; Sisyrinchium eastwoodiae E.P.Bicknell; Sisyrinchium greenei E.P.Bicknell; Sisyrinchium hesperium E.P.Bicknell; Sisyrinchium maritimum A.Heller

= Sisyrinchium bellum =

Species of flowering plant

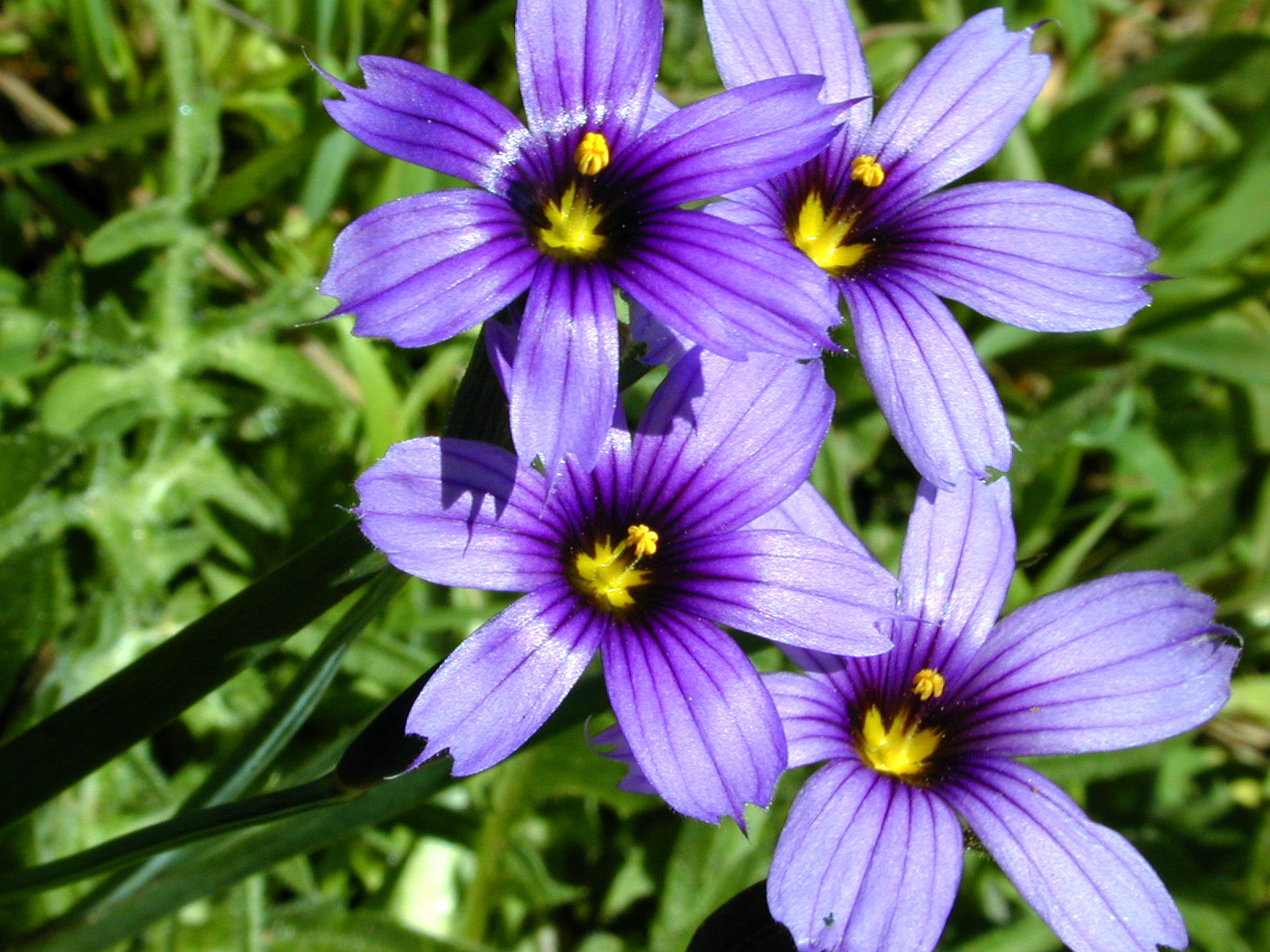
Flowers are 10.5–17 mm and bluish-purple, bluish violet to pale blue, sometimes even white. Petals tips are notched or flattened with a little point.

Sisyrinchium bellum, the western blue-eyed grass or Californian blue-eyed grass, is the common blue-eyed grass of California and Oregon in and west of the Sierra Nevada, its range extending south into Baja California. In parts of its range, western blue-eyed grass has previously been classified as Sisyrinchium eastwoodiae, S. greenei and S. hesperium, but these names are now considered synonyms.

Sisyrinchium bellum grows as a perennial plant in open places where there is some moisture, particularly grassy areas, though it can also be found in woodlands and at altitudes up to 2,400 metres (7,900 ft). Like other species of blue-eyed grasses that are locally dominant, it is generally known simply as "blue-eyed grass" within its natural range.

== Description ==
The stems of Sisyrinchium bellum can grow as long as 60 centimetres (24 in), though they are often shorter. Its leaves are grassy and tufted. The flowers are 1–2 centimetres (0.39–0.79 in) in diameter and purplish-blue, varying somewhat in color from a true blue to a definite purple; occasional white-flowering plants are found. It flowers from March to July with a peak in April. Dried in air, its seeds weigh between 1 and 4 mg. After flowering, it dies to the ground and is dormant over the summer.

== Cultivation ==
Sisyrinchium bellum prefers some moisture and good drainage, but will tolerate summer dryness. It can be propagated by seed, and it self-sows. It can also be propagated by division of its rhizomes, and the flower stems can be rooted. It is moderately hardy and will tolerate temperatures down to 20 °F (−7 °C).

== Uses ==
The Ohlone used an infusion of the roots and leaves as a cure for indigestion and stomach pain, and similar uses are recorded from other Native American peoples.
