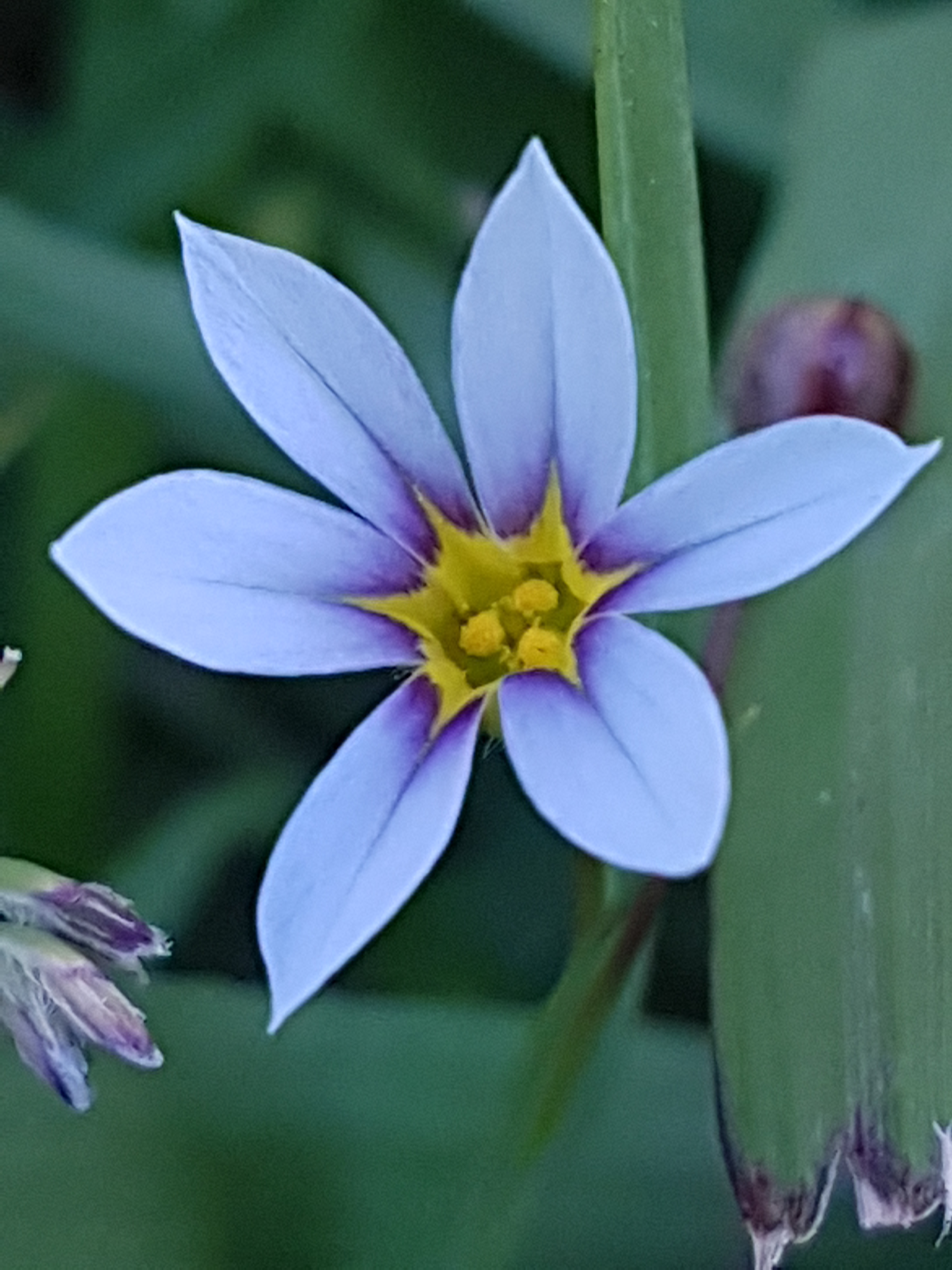

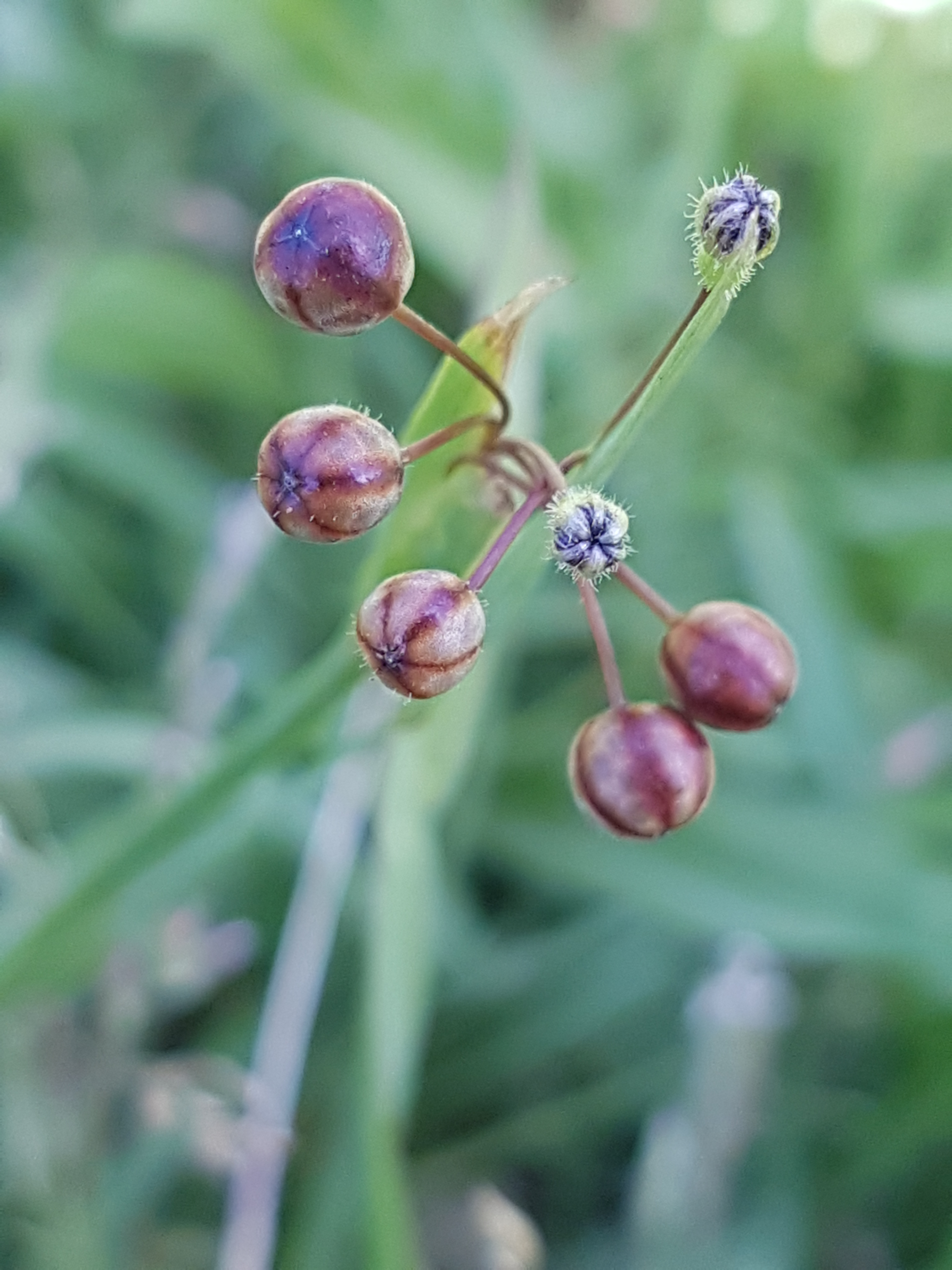

Scientific classification
- Kingdom: Plantae
- Clade: Tracheophytes
- Clade: Angiosperms
- Clade: Monocots
- Order: Asparagales
- Family: Iridaceae
- Genus: Sisyrinchium
- Species: S. micranthum

Binomial name
- Sisyrinchium micranthum Cav.

Synonyms
- Bermudiana bermudiana var. iridifolia (Kunth) Kuntze; Bermudiana bermudiana var. micrantha (Cav.) Kuntze; Bermudiana iridifolia (Kunth) Kuntze nom. illeg.; Bermudiana micrantha (Cav.) Kuntze; Marica iridifolia (Kunth) Ker Gawl.; Marica micrantha (Cav.) Ker Gawl.; Sisyrinchium brownii Small; Sisyrinchium dichroum Poepp. ex Klatt; Sisyrinchium exile E.P.Bicknell; Sisyrinchium fimbriatum Dombey ex Klatt; Sisyrinchium iridifolium Kunth; Sisyrinchium micranthemum Pers.; Sisyrinchium rosulatum E.P.Bicknell

= Sisyrinchium micranthum =

Species of grass-like plant

Sisyrinchium micranthum, commonly known as annual blue-eyed grass, blue pigroot, fairy stars, and striped rush-leaf, is a wildflower. It is a grass-like species in the iris family, Iridaceae. It is native to Mexico, Central America, and South America and widely naturalized elsewhere. The flowers are between 10 and 20 mm in diameter. Often the flowers are white with blue to purple centers, but may bloom in other colors such as yellow, pink, or violet. These are followed by rounded 3 to 8 mm brown capsules that enclose the dark brown seeds.

In much of its range, especially the southeastern United States, this species was known by the synonym Sisyrinchium rosulatum. This name is still often seen in older descriptions that have not yet been updated.
