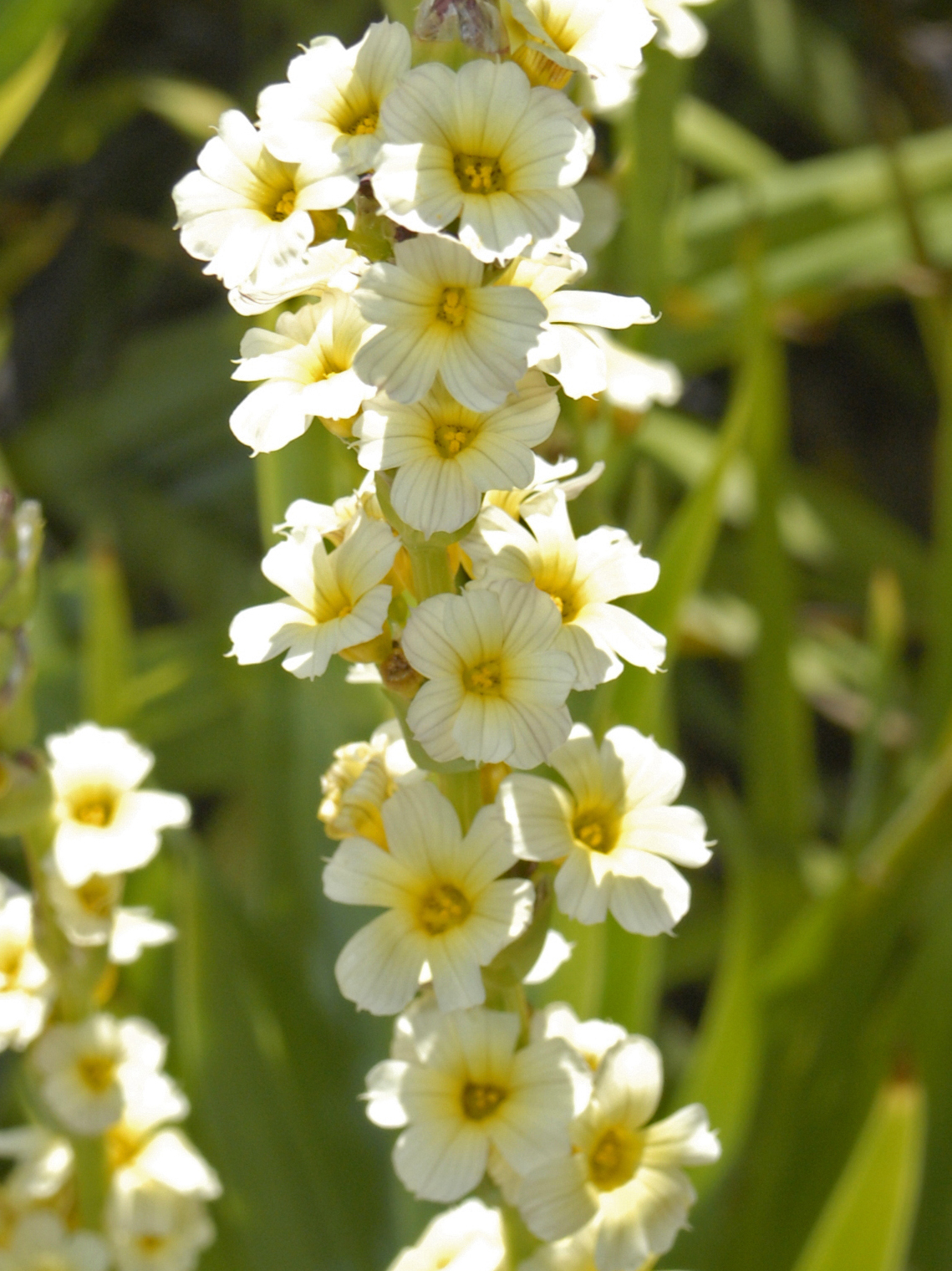
- Sisyrinchium striatum at the Jardin des Plantes, Paris

Scientific classification
- Kingdom: Plantae
- Clade: Tracheophytes
- Clade: Angiosperms
- Clade: Monocots
- Order: Asparagales
- Family: Iridaceae
- Genus: Sisyrinchium
- Species: S. striatum

Binomial name
- Sisyrinchium striatum Sm.

Synonyms
- Bermudiana striata (Sm.) Moench; Ferraria ochroleuca Salisb.; Marica striata (Sm.) Ker Gawl.; Moraea sertula Jacq.; Paneguia striata (Sm.) Raf.; Sisyrinchium libertioides Steud. nom. inval.; Sisyrinchium lutescens Lodd.; Sisyrinchium reticulatum Dum.Cours.; Sisyrinchium sertiflorum Salisb.; Sisyrinchium spicatum Cav.

= Sisyrinchium striatum =

Species of flowering plant

Sisyrinchium striatum, common names pale yellow-eyed-grass or satin flower, is an evergreen perennial plant in the family Iridaceae.

== Description ==
Sisyrinchium striatum can reach a height of 70–90 centimetres (28–35 in). It has an erect stem with a clump of grey-green sword-shaped alternate leaves and several clusters of cup-shaped creamy white flowers with six tepals and golden centers. They bloom from May to June in the northern hemisphere.

== Distribution ==
This species is native to Argentina and Chile. It grows in alpine grasslands, open woods and meadows.
