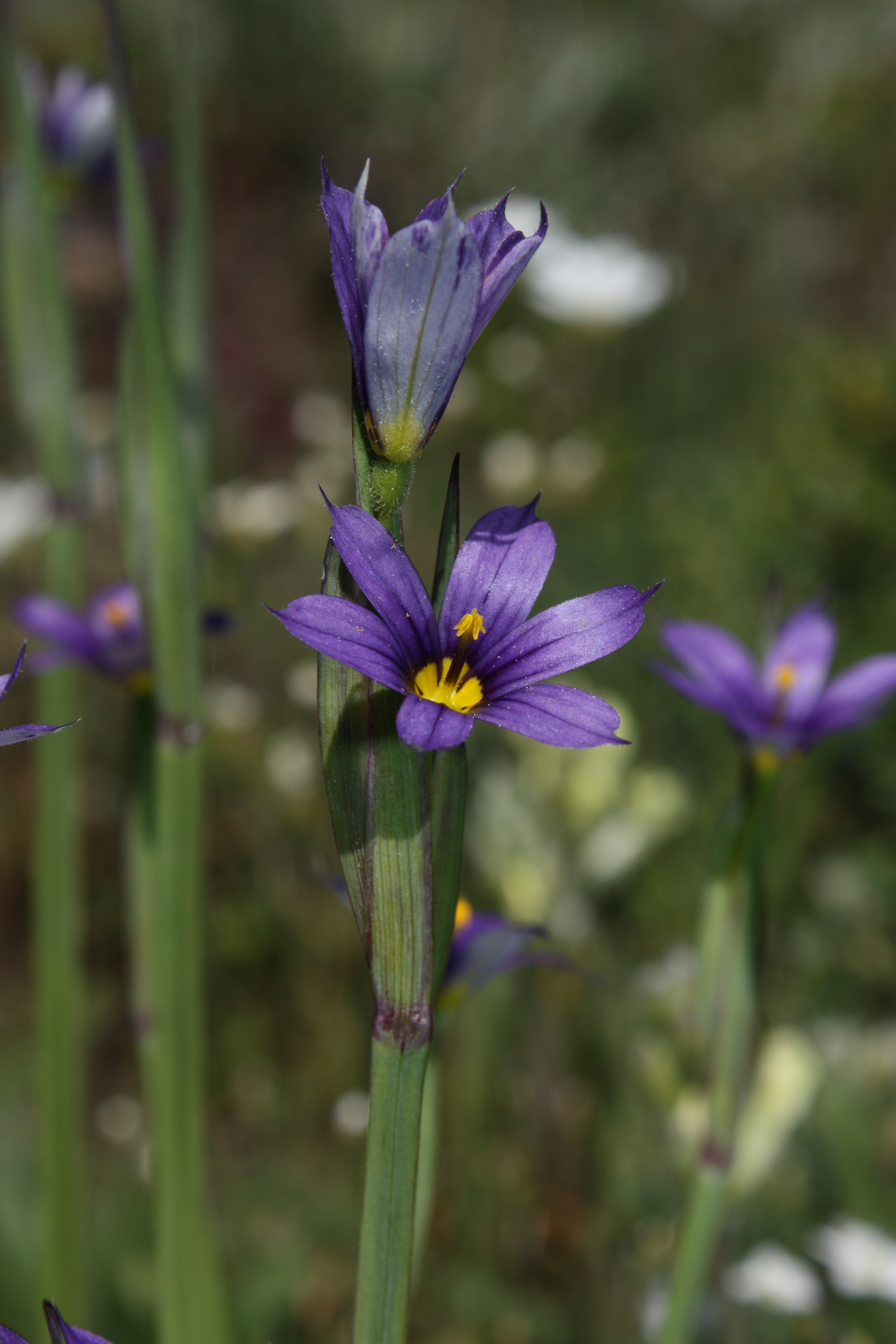

Conservation status
- Secure (NatureServe)

Scientific classification
- Kingdom: Plantae
- Clade: Tracheophytes
- Clade: Angiosperms
- Clade: Monocots
- Order: Asparagales
- Family: Iridaceae
- Genus: Sisyrinchium
- Species: S. idahoense

Binomial name
- Sisyrinchium idahoense E.P.Bicknell

Varieties
- S. idahoense var. idahoense; S. idahoense var. macounii (E.P.Bicknell) Douglass M.Hend.; S. idahoense var. occidentale (E.P.Bicknell) Douglass M.Hend.; S. idahoense var. segetum (E.P.Bicknell) Douglass M.Hend.

Synonyms
- List: Sisyrinchium birameum Piper (1906); Sisyrinchium idahoense var. birameum (Piper) J.K.Henry (1917); Sisyrinchium juncellum Greene (1912); Sisyrinchium macounii E.P.Bicknell (1900); Sisyrinchium occidentale E.P.Bicknell (1899); Sisyrinchium oreophilum E.P.Bicknell (1904); Sisyrinchium segetum E.P.Bicknell (1899)

= Sisyrinchium idahoense =

North American plant species in the iris family

Sisyrinchium idahoense, the Idaho blue-eyed grass, is a perennial that is native to western North America. It is not a true grass, but is instead in the family Iridaceae.

== Characteristics ==
Sisyrinchium idahoense is found in generally moist grassy areas and open woodlands, and by stream banks, below 2,400 metres (7,900 ft). It grows 6–18 in tall with narrow grass-like leaves. The flower is usually a deep bluish purple to blue-violet, or pale blue, rarely white, and yellow-throated.
