= Sisyrinchium halophilum =

Scientific classification
- Kingdom: Plantae
- Clade: Tracheophytes
- Clade: Angiosperms
- Clade: Monocots
- Order: Asparagales
- Family: Iridaceae
- Genus: Sisyrinchium
- Species: S. halophilum

Binomial name
- Sisyrinchium halophilum Greene

Synonyms
- Sisyrinchium leptocaulon E.P.Bicknell

Species of flowering plant

Sisyrinchium halophilum is a species of flowering plant in the family Iridaceae known by the common name Nevada blue-eyed grass. It is native to the western United States in and around the Great Basin and Mojave Desert, where it grows in moist, often highly alkaline habitat, such as seeps, meadows, and mineral springs.

== Description ==
Sisyrinchium halophilum is a rhizomatous perennial herb. It takes a clumpy form, producing waxy stems up 26 to 40 centimeters in height. The flat leaves are grasslike. The flower has six tepals measuring roughly one centimeter long each. They are pale blue to purple-blue with yellow bases. The tepal tips are often squared or notched or have a tiny point. The fruit is a beige capsule.
