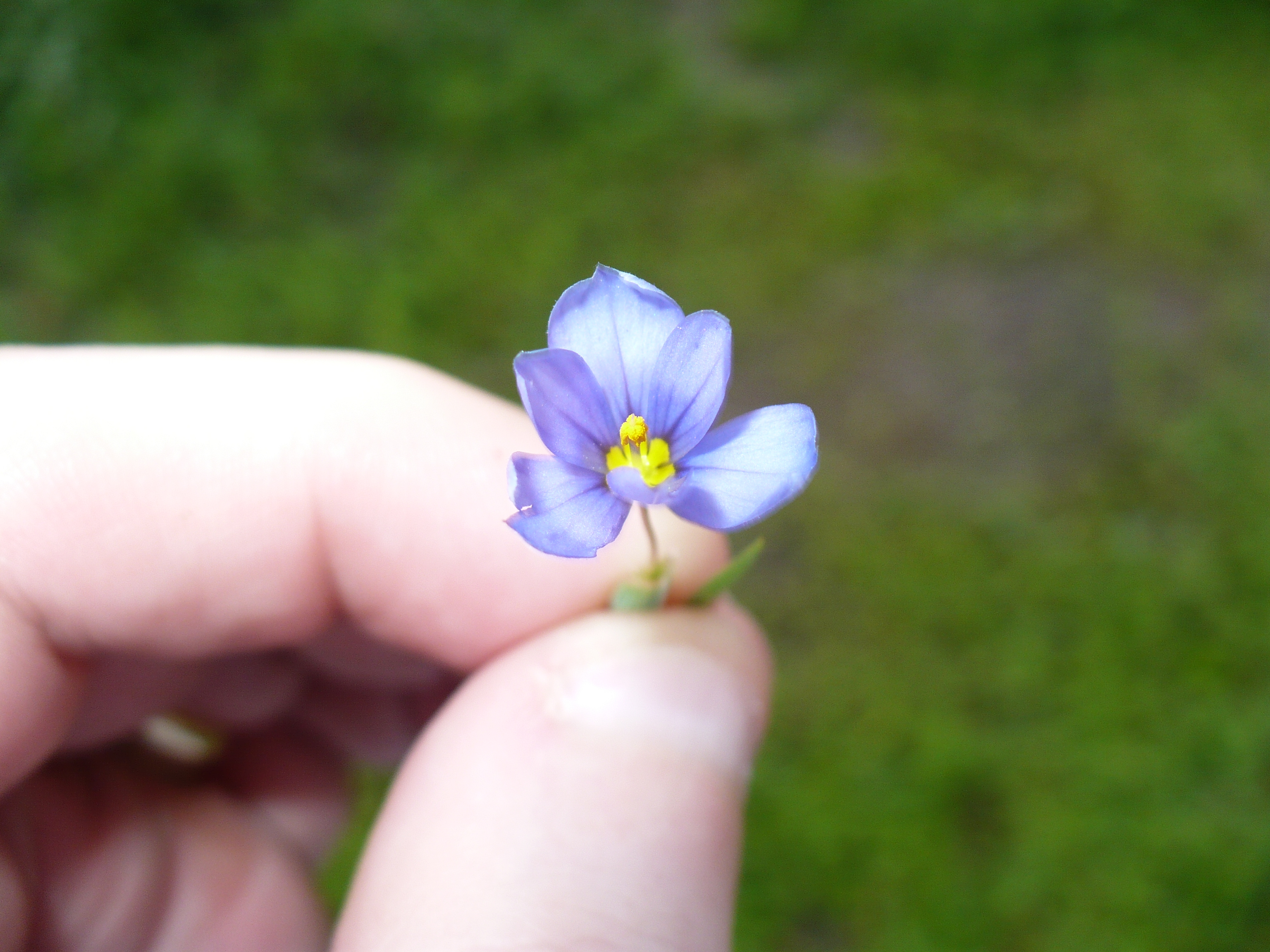

Scientific classification
- Kingdom: Plantae
- Clade: Tracheophytes
- Clade: Angiosperms
- Clade: Monocots
- Order: Asparagales
- Family: Iridaceae
- Genus: Sisyrinchium
- Species: S. pruinosum

Binomial name
- Sisyrinchium pruinosum E.P.Bicknell 1901

Synonyms
- Sisyrinchium brayi E.P.Bicknell; Sisyrinchium bushii E.P.Bicknell; Sisyrinchium helleri E.P.Bicknell; Sisyrinchium texanum E.P.Bicknell; Sisyrinchium varians E.P.Bicknell

= Sisyrinchium pruinosum =

Dotted blue-eyed grass

Species of flowering plant

Sisyrinchium pruinosum, the dotted blue-eyed grass, is a perennial plant in the family Iridaceae, native to the south-central United States. There are also reports of the plant in California, but these appear to represent naturalizations. It is sometimes considered to be a synonym of Sisyrinchium langloisii.

== Description ==
- Plant: Upright or scrawling, clumped, delicate, smooth perennial 3.5-12 in. (9–30 cm) high; stems slender, usually several, unbranched, flattened, not conspicuously winged as in some species.
- Flower: up to 1.125 in.(3 cm) across, violet-purple to purple-blue, rarely white, the 6 segments all appearing petal-like, wide-spreading. Flowers usually 1 or a few in cluster at tip of stem, closing during overcast weather.
- Leaves: up to 9 in.(22.5 cm) long, .125 in.(3 mm) wide, basal, slender, grasslike and flattened like flower stem
- Habitat: Clay or sandy clay in open prairies, pastures, meadows, open woodlands and oak uplands.

These plants are usually found in abundance and can be spectacular on warm, sunny days where they cover entire pastures with almost solid sheets of blue. They are very beautiful used as borders in the wildflower garden. Sisyrinchium species hybridize readily, often making species identification quite difficult.
