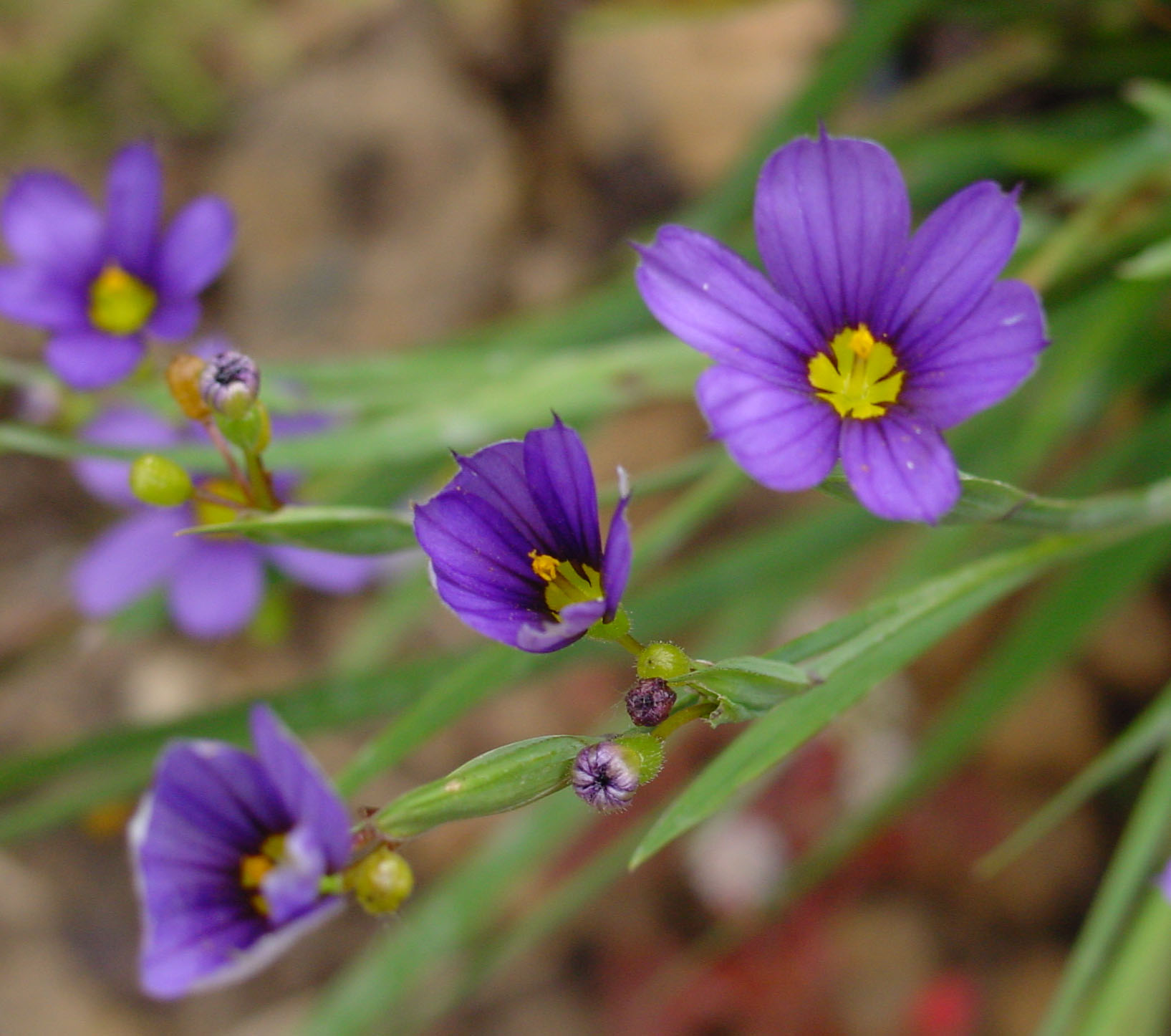

Scientific classification
- Kingdom: Plantae
- Clade: Embryophytes
- Clade: Tracheophytes
- Clade: Angiosperms
- Clade: Monocots
- Order: Asparagales
- Family: Iridaceae
- Genus: Sisyrinchium
- Species: S. bermudiana

Binomial name
- Sisyrinchium bermudiana L., nom. cons.

Synonyms
- Moraea bermudiana (L.) Thunb.; Marica bermudiana (L.) Ker Gawl.; Bermudiana bermudiana (L.) Kuntze, nom. inval.

= Sisyrinchium bermudiana =

Species of plant in the iris family

Sisyrinchium bermudiana, known as Bermudiana or, along with other members of the genus, as blue-eyed grass, is a flower of the genus Sisyrinchium (of the Iris family) that is native to the Atlantic archipelago, and British Overseas Territory, of Bermuda and the island of Ireland. The plant appears and blooms in the spring. It is used as a national flower by Bermudians, and appears in art, jewellery, banknotes and elsewhere.

== Description ==
The plant has green to greyish-green strap-like basal leaves. In spring the flowers appear, six purple-blue perianth segments, joined into a central yellow coloured tube, from which the 3 stamens protrude, along with a 3-lobed style. The ovary is inferior. There are several flowers in a group on each branched flower stem. The seed pods are dark in colour and release many small round black seeds.

== Taxonomy ==
Sisyrinchium bermudiana was first described by Carl Linnaeus in 1753. The first described species in the genus Sisyrinchium, it is thus the type species. Linnaeus's specific epithet bermudiana was not an adjective (and thus does not have to agree in gender with Sisyrinchium) but a noun in apposition, derived from the earlier genus name Bermudiana. He showed this by capitalizing the epithet, but modern practice is to use lower-case for all epithets.

== Distribution and habitat ==
Its distribution, in the Atlantic archipelago, Bermuda and Ireland, has led to the suggestion that it was introduced to Ireland, rather than being endemic. There are no records of it in Ireland before 1845.

It grows in sandy areas, wet meadows, near lakes and coastal forest floors, but is also grown widely as a garden ornamental. It will spread by self-seeding to cover the ground.
