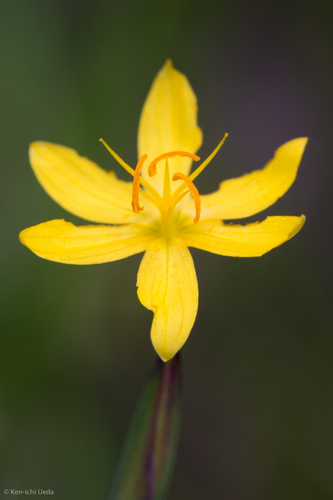

Scientific classification
- Kingdom: Plantae
- Clade: Tracheophytes
- Clade: Angiosperms
- Clade: Monocots
- Order: Asparagales
- Family: Iridaceae
- Genus: Sisyrinchium
- Species: S. elmeri

Binomial name
- Sisyrinchium elmeri Greene

Synonyms
- Hydastylus elmeri (Greene) E.P.Bicknell; Hydastylus rivularis E.P.Bicknell

= Sisyrinchium elmeri =

Species of flowering plant

Sisyrinchium elmeri is a species of flowering plant in the family Iridaceae known by the common name Elmer's blue-eyed grass. It is endemic to California, where it is known from many of the mountain ranges from the Klamath Mountains through the Sierra Nevada to the San Bernardino Mountains. It grows in moist habitat types such as meadows and bogs.

== Description ==
Sisyrinchium elmeri is rhizomatous perennial herb takes a clumpy form, its narrow stems growing up to about 20 to 30 centimeters tall. It is medium green and nonwaxy, and it dries to a dark green or brownish color, but does not turn black. The flat, narrow leaves are grasslike. The flower has six tepals measuring roughly a centimeter long. They are yellow to yellow-orange with dark brown veining. The fruit is a dark brown capsule.
