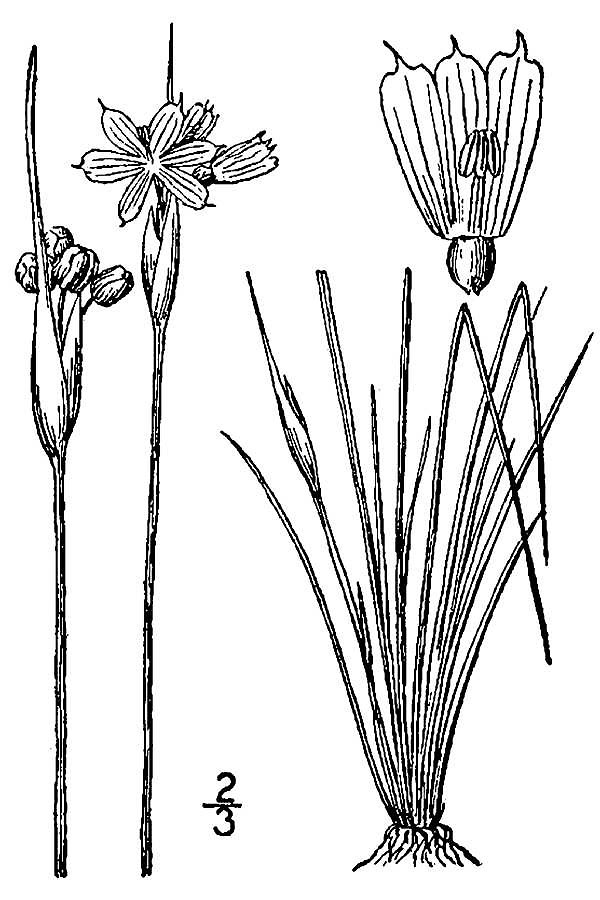
- A botanical illustration from Illustrated flora of the northern states and Canada by Nathaniel Lord Britton and Addison Brown

Conservation status
- Secure (NatureServe)

Scientific classification
- Kingdom: Plantae
- Clade: Tracheophytes
- Clade: Angiosperms
- Clade: Monocots
- Order: Asparagales
- Family: Iridaceae
- Genus: Sisyrinchium
- Species: S. campestre

Binomial name
- Sisyrinchium campestre E.P.Bicknell

= Sisyrinchium campestre =

Species of flowering plant

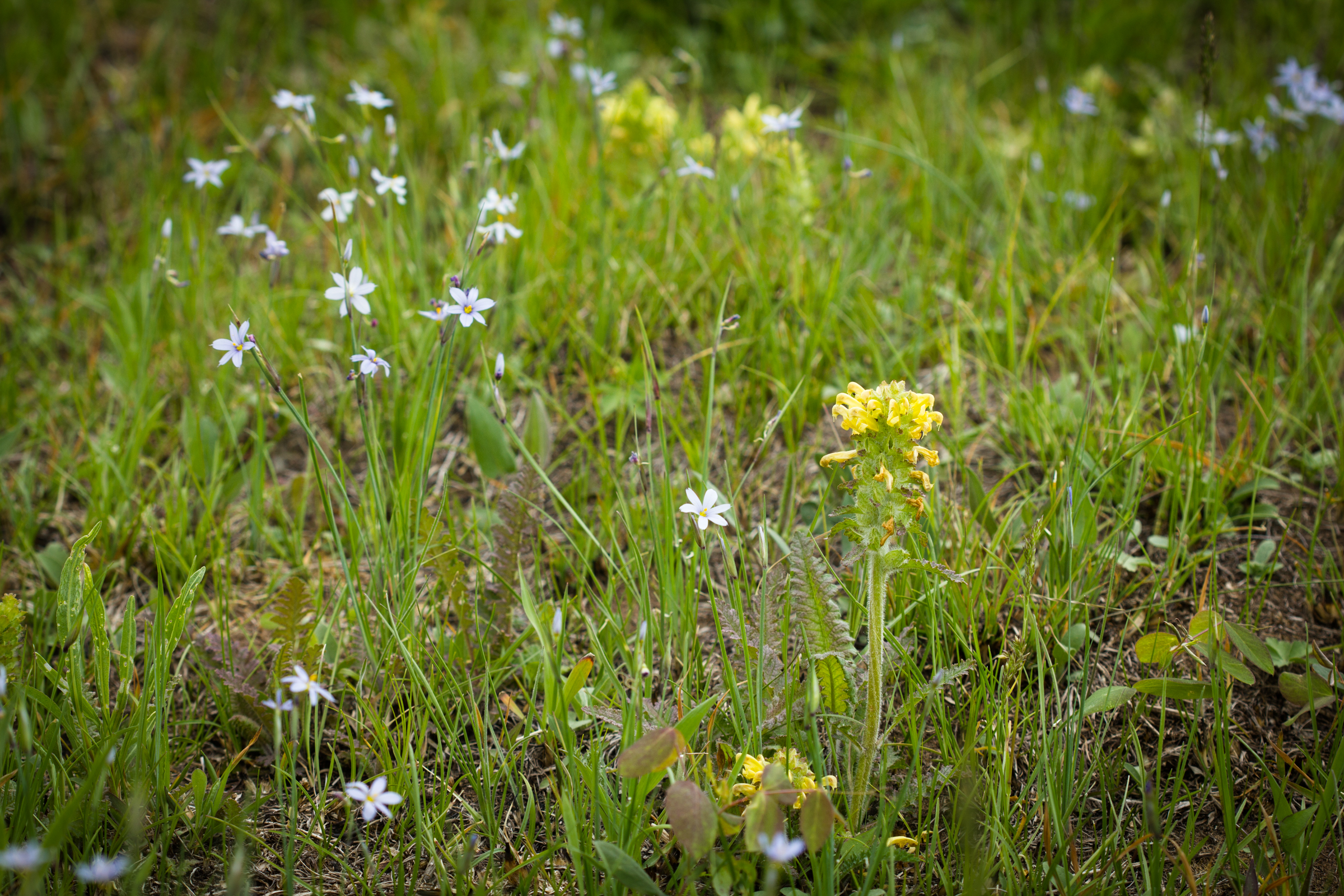
Prairie blue-eyed grass blooming with wood betony at Crex Meadows in Wisconsin

Sisyrinchium campestre, the prairie blue-eyed grass or white-eyed grass, is a small herbaceous perennial plant in the iris family, native to prairie and meadow in the central United States and in extreme southern Manitoba.

Prairie blue-eyed grass is one of the more drought tolerant species in the genus. It blooms in late spring and early summer for about three weeks. The flowers are white to pale blue, with yellow centers. They have six tepals 7 to 12.7 mm (0.28 to 0.50 in) long that have rounded ends with a sharp point in the center. The flowers are borne on slender pedicels (stems) in an umbel enclosed in two bracts at the top of an unbranched flat stem. The leaves are grass-like, 3 to 10 inches (8 to 25 cm) long and 2 to 3 mm (0.08 to 0.12 in) across, and the flower stem is about as long as or a little longer than the leaves. The root system is coarse and fibrous. A plant produces offsets and forms a dense clump over time.
