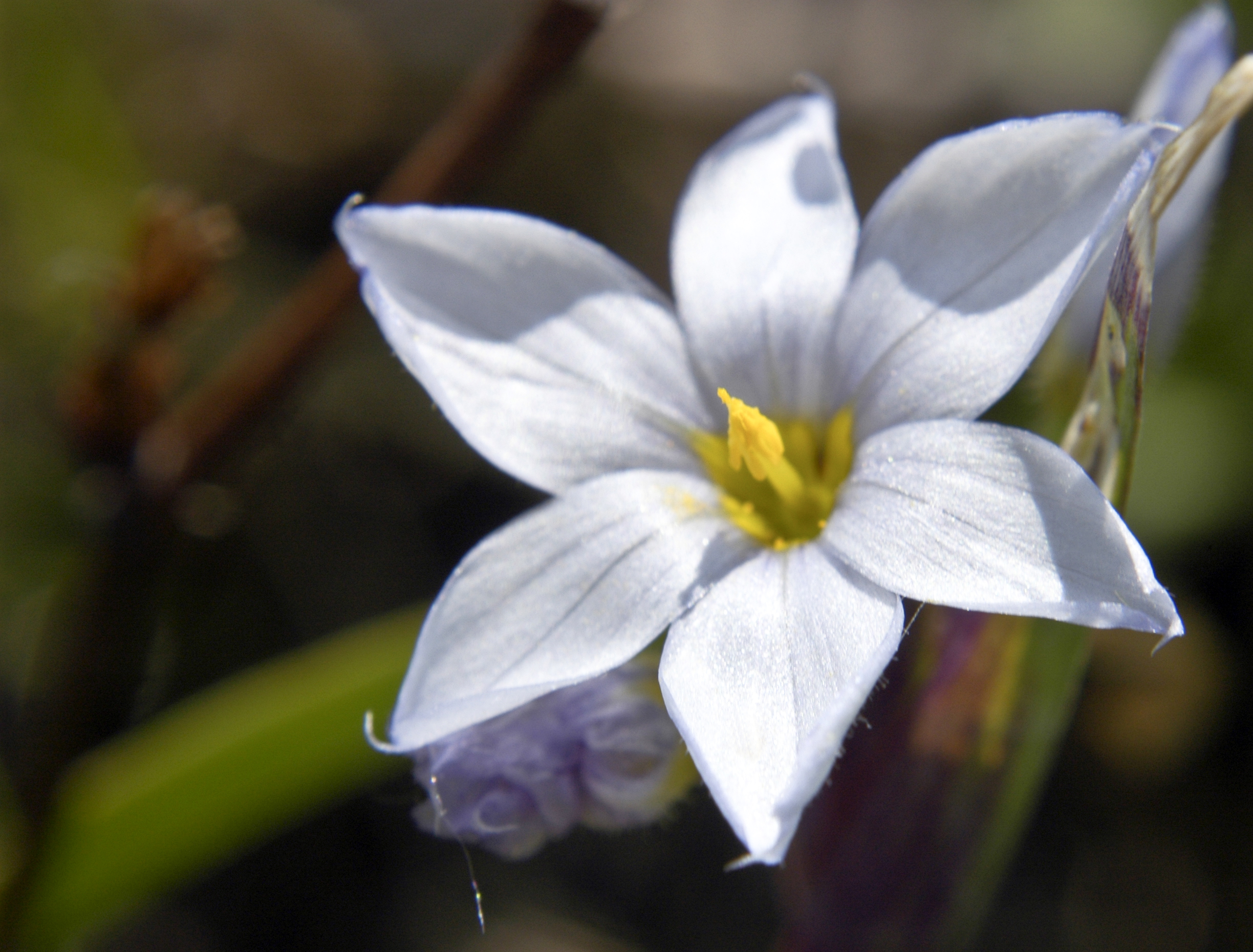
- Sisyrinchium albidum flower

Conservation status
- Secure (NatureServe)

Scientific classification
- Kingdom: Plantae
- Clade: Tracheophytes
- Clade: Angiosperms
- Clade: Monocots
- Order: Asparagales
- Family: Iridaceae
- Genus: Sisyrinchium
- Species: S. albidum

Binomial name
- Sisyrinchium albidum Raf.

= Sisyrinchium albidum =

Species of flowering plant

Sisyrinchium albidum, commonly known as white blue-eyed grass, is a species of flowering plant in the family Iridaceae.

== Description ==
The stem of Sisyrinchium albidum is commonly pale grey and threadlike, measuring 0.2 to 0.5 m high and 0.5 to 1 mm wide. Similarly, its narrow, stiff leaves are 0.5 to 1 mm wide. Its twinned spathes (by which it is characterized, along with its leaves) are green and purple-tinged and 1.5 to 2 cm high. The outer part of the flower, including the petals, is white to violet and 8–10 mm long. Its fruits are 2–4 mm long and a pale yellow-green. It is found mostly in eastern North America.
