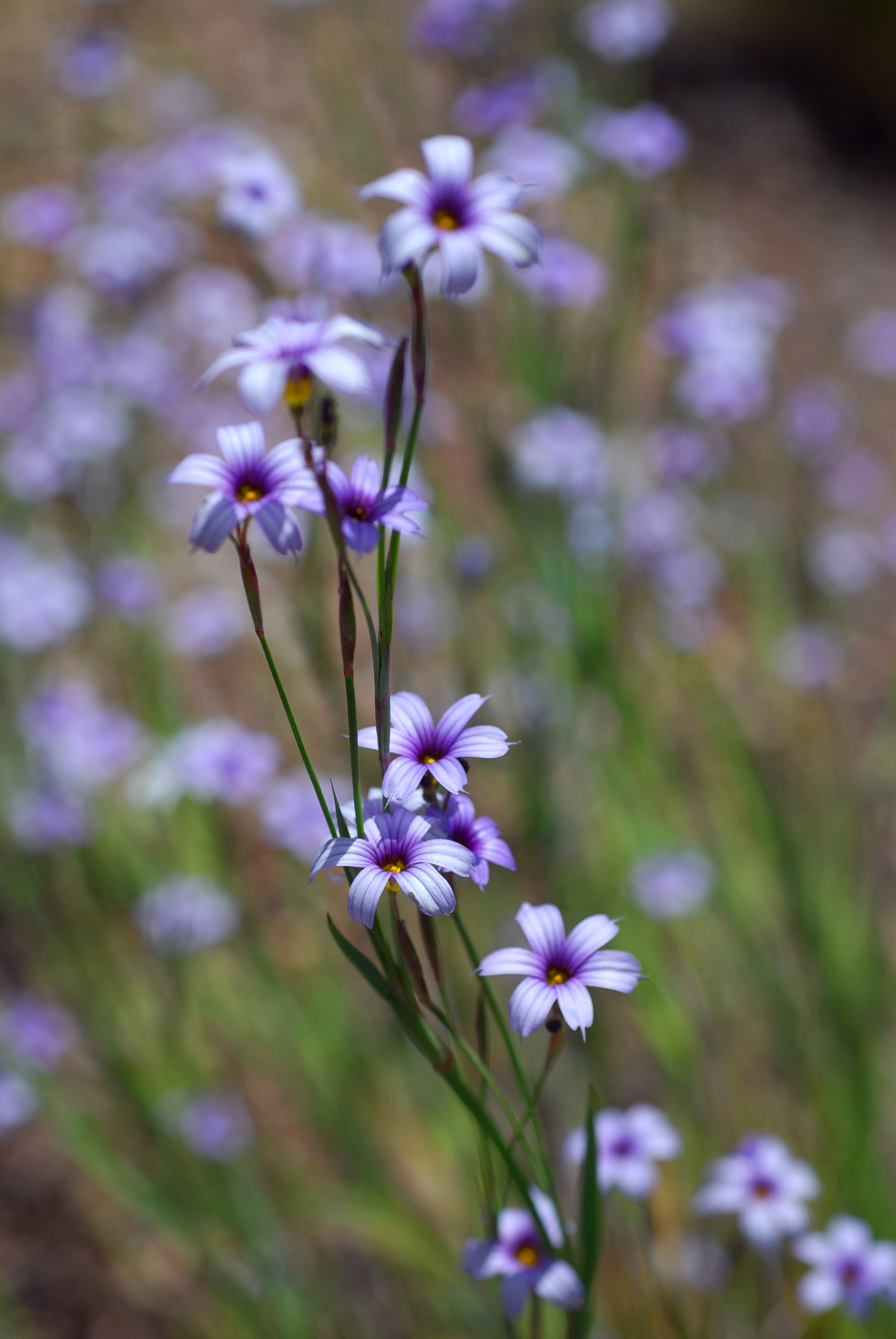

Scientific classification
- Kingdom: Plantae
- Clade: Tracheophytes
- Clade: Angiosperms
- Clade: Monocots
- Order: Asparagales
- Family: Iridaceae
- Genus: Sisyrinchium
- Species: S. platense

Binomial name
- Sisyrinchium platense I.M.Johnst.

= Sisyrinchium platense =

Species of flowering plant

Sisyrinchium platense is a species of flowering plant in the family Iridaceae. Native to the Pampas region of South America (Bolivia, Peru, northern Argentina, southern Brazil, Uruguay) they are found growing in fertile and moist soils.

== Description ==
Sisyrinchium platense is a herbaceous perennial with many thin leaves produced from fleshy roots. It normally grows about 20 cm high.

Plants are spring blooming and the flower display is showy. Like other species in this genus they have flowers with six petal-like tepals that are bluish violet in color with darker veins, the flowers arise from the top of the stems and have green flat bracts. Fruits are capsules with many small seeds.
