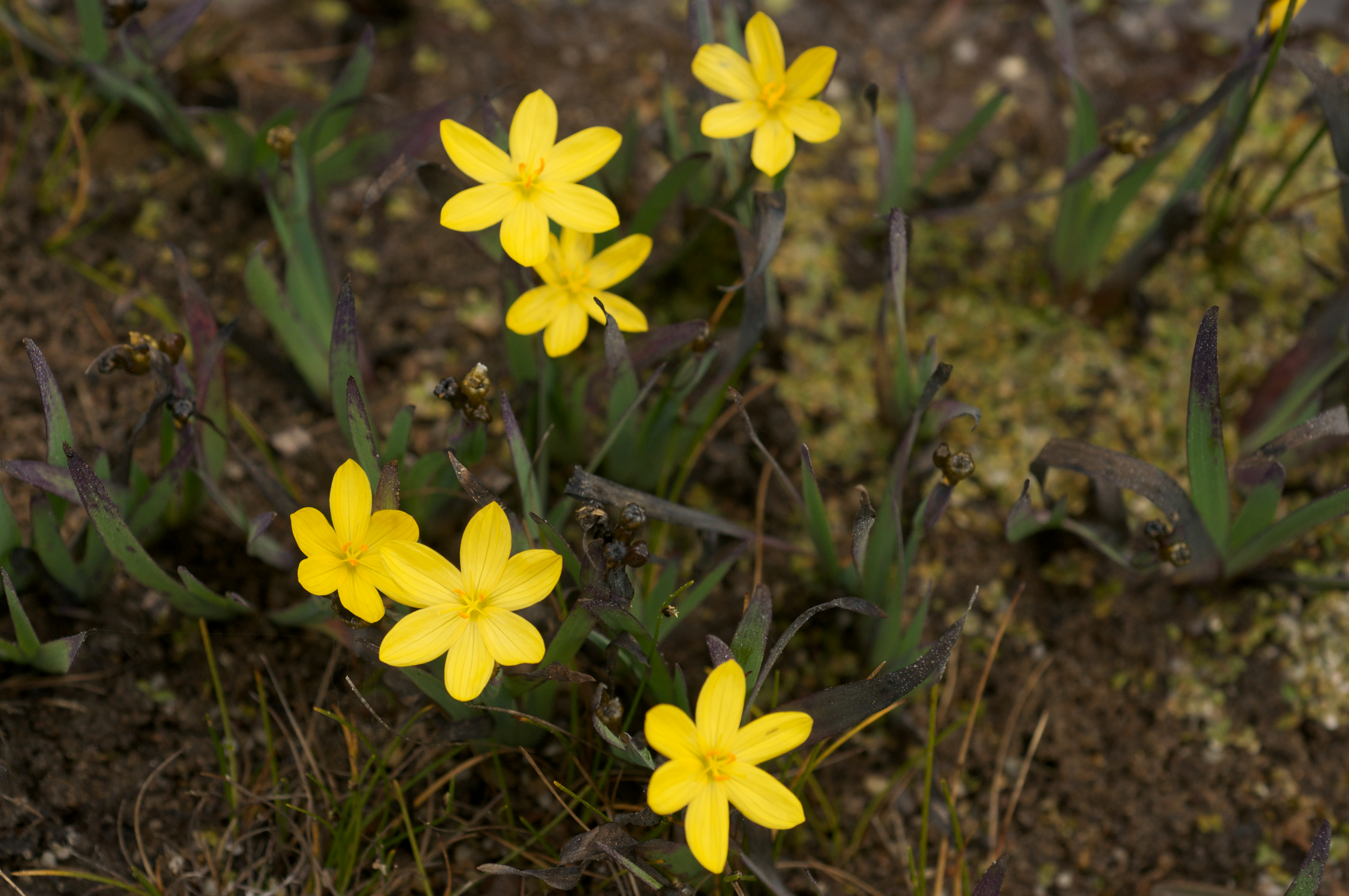

Scientific classification
- Kingdom: Plantae
- Clade: Tracheophytes
- Clade: Angiosperms
- Clade: Monocots
- Order: Asparagales
- Family: Iridaceae
- Genus: Sisyrinchium
- Species: S. californicum

Binomial name
- Sisyrinchium californicum (Ker Gawl.) Dryand.

Synonyms
- List: Bermudiana californica (Dryand.) Kuntze; Echthronema californica (Ker Gawl.) Herb.; Hydastylus borealis E.P.Bicknell; Hydastylus brachypus E.P.Bicknell; Hydastylus californicus (Ker Gawl.) Salisb.; Marica acorifolia Ker Gawl.; Marica californica Ker Gawl.; Olsynium luteum Raf.; Sisyrinchium boreale (E.P. Bicknell) A. Nelson & J.F. Macbr.; Sisyrinchium boreale (E.P.Bicknell) J.K.Henry; Sisyrinchium brachypus (E.P.Bicknell) J.K.Henry; Sisyrinchium brachypus E.P. Bicknell; Sisyrinchium convolutum Klatt nom. illeg.; Sisyrinchium flavidum Kellogg; Sisyrinchium flavum Hoffmanns. ex Steud. nom. inval.; Sisyrinchium lineatum Torr.

= Sisyrinchium californicum =

Species of flowering plant

Sisyrinchium californicum is a species of flowering plant in the iris family known by the common names golden blue-eyed grass, yellow-eyed-grass, and golden-eyed-grass. It is native to the west coast of North America from British Columbia to central California, where it grows in moist habitat, often in coastal areas.

== Description ==
Sisyrinchium californicum is a rhizomatous perennial herb producing a pale green, nonwaxy stem which grows up to about 60 centimeters tall. The foliage turns dark brown or black as it dries. The flat, narrow leaves are grasslike. The flower has six tepals each between 1 and 2 centimeters in length. They are light to bright yellow, often with brown veining. The fruit is a dark-colored capsule.
