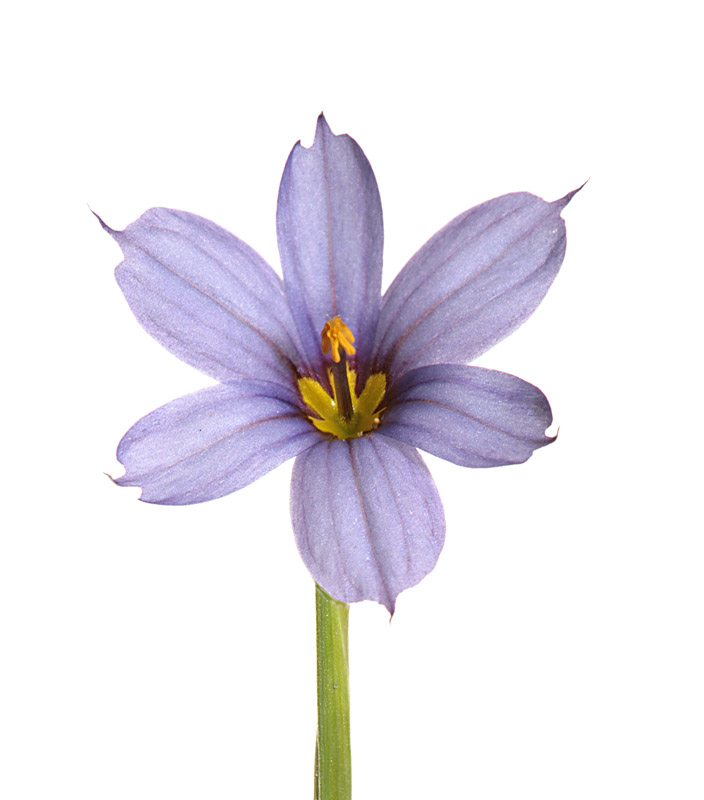

Conservation status
- Secure (NatureServe)

Scientific classification
- Kingdom: Plantae
- Clade: Tracheophytes
- Clade: Angiosperms
- Clade: Monocots
- Order: Asparagales
- Family: Iridaceae
- Genus: Sisyrinchium
- Species: S. angustifolium

Binomial name
- Sisyrinchium angustifolium Mill., 1768

Synonyms
- List: Bermudiana angustifolia (Mill.) Kuntze (1891); Bermudiana bermudiana var. albida Kuntze (1898); Bermudiana bermudiana var. angustifolia (Mill.) Kuntze (1898); Sisyrinchium bermudiana subsp. angustifolium (Mill.) P.Fourn. (1935); Bermudiana graminea Gaertn. (1788); Bermudiana graminea (Lam.) Nieuwl. (1913); Bermudiana graminifolia Medik. (1787); Bermudiana homomalla (Klatt) Kuntze (1891); Bermudiana iridifolia Medik. (1787); Ferraria pulchella Salisb. (1796); Ferraria violacea Salisb. (1796); Marica mucronata Ker Gawl. (1827); Sisyrinchium acuminatum Herb. (1843); Sisyrinchium anceps Cav. (1788); Sisyrinchium bermudiana var. anceps (Cav.) A.Gray (1867); Sisyrinchium carolinianum E.P.Bicknell (1899); Sisyrinchium cultrifolium Noronha (1790); Sisyrinchium excisum Godr. (1853); Sisyrinchium gramineum Lam. (1785); Sisyrinchium graminoides E.P.Bicknell (1896); Sisyrinchium hibernicum Á.Löve & D.Löve (1961); Sisyrinchium homomallum Klatt (1882); Sisyrinchium iridioides Curtis (1789); Sisyrinchium membranaceum E.P.Bicknell (1899); Sisyrinchium nuttallii Sweet (1826); Sisyrinchium ramosum Herb. (1843)

= Sisyrinchium angustifolium =

Narrow-leaf blue-eyed-grass

Plant species in the iris family

Sisyrinchium angustifolium, commonly known as narrow-leaf blue-eyed-grass, is a herbaceous perennial growing from rhizomes, native to the eastern United States, stretching as far west as Texas and Kansas, where it is the most common blue-eyed grass. It is commonly cultivated as an ornamental.

== Description ==
Height: 15–50 cm (6–20 in). Stem: broadly winged, 2–4 mm (1/16–3/16 in) wide, usually branched. Leaves: 2–6 mm (1/16–1/4 in) wide. Tepals: 6, blue, 7–10 mm (1/4–3/8 in), each tipped with a sharp point, veined, and darkening toward central yellow patch.

== Ecology ==
=== Habitat ===
S. angustifolium is most commonly found in habitats such as woodlands, meadows, and sandhill swales.

This species possesses an intermediate shade tolerance and is adapted to both fine and medium-textured soils.

=== Phenology ===
S. angustifolium tends to flower from January to May, with peak inflorescence occurring in the spring, around April.

== Gallery ==
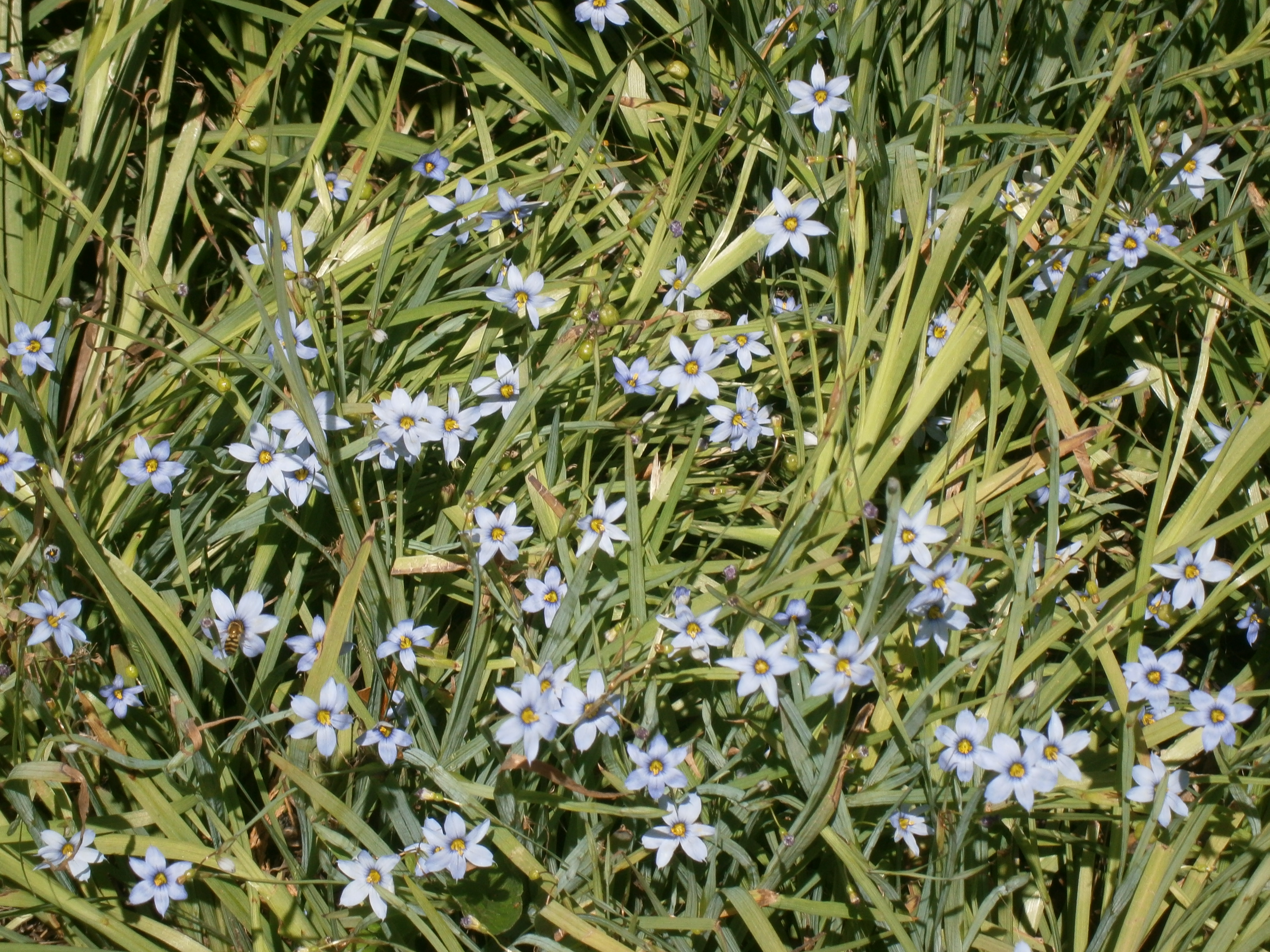
Many in a hedge

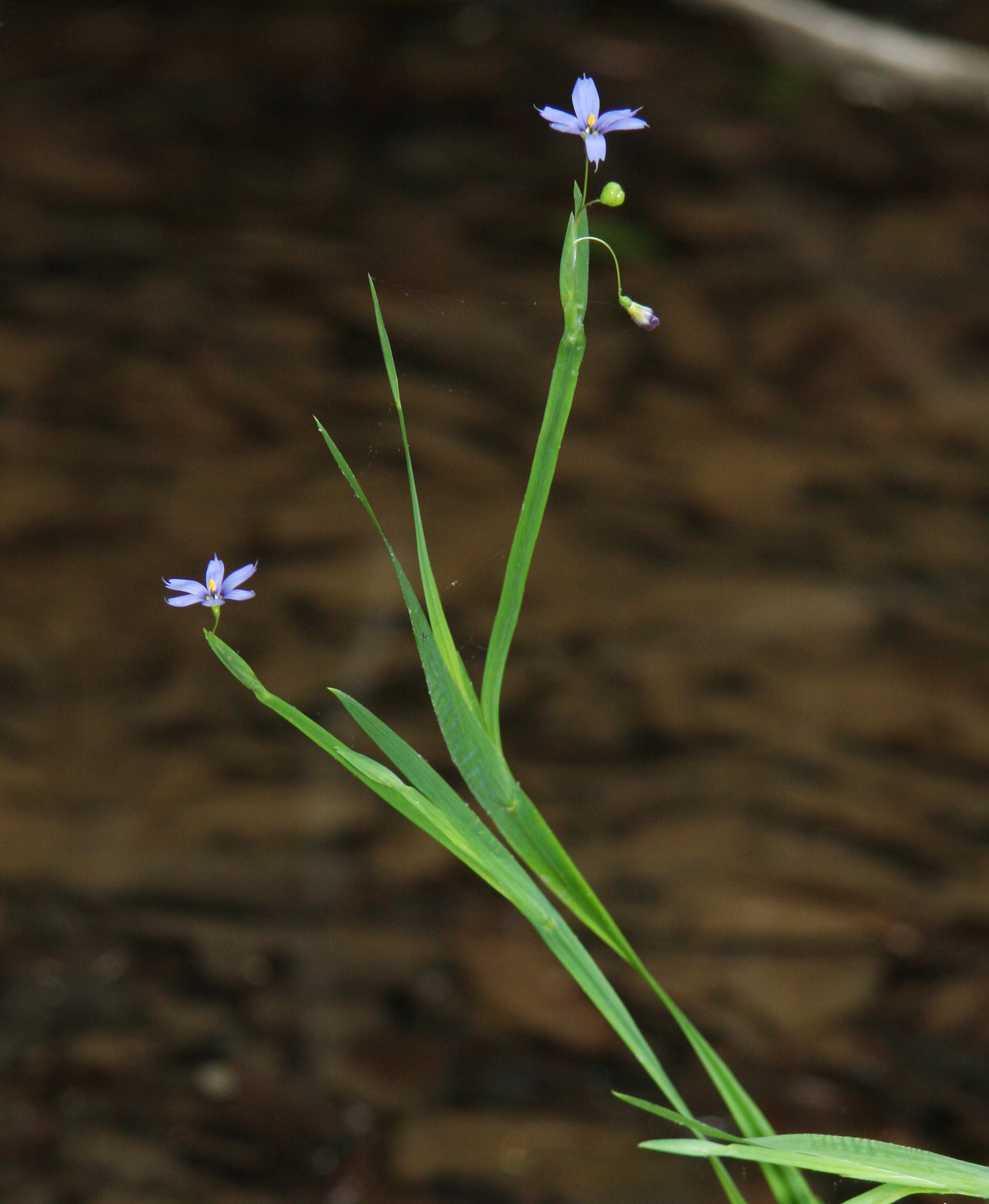
Flowers, stem, and leaves

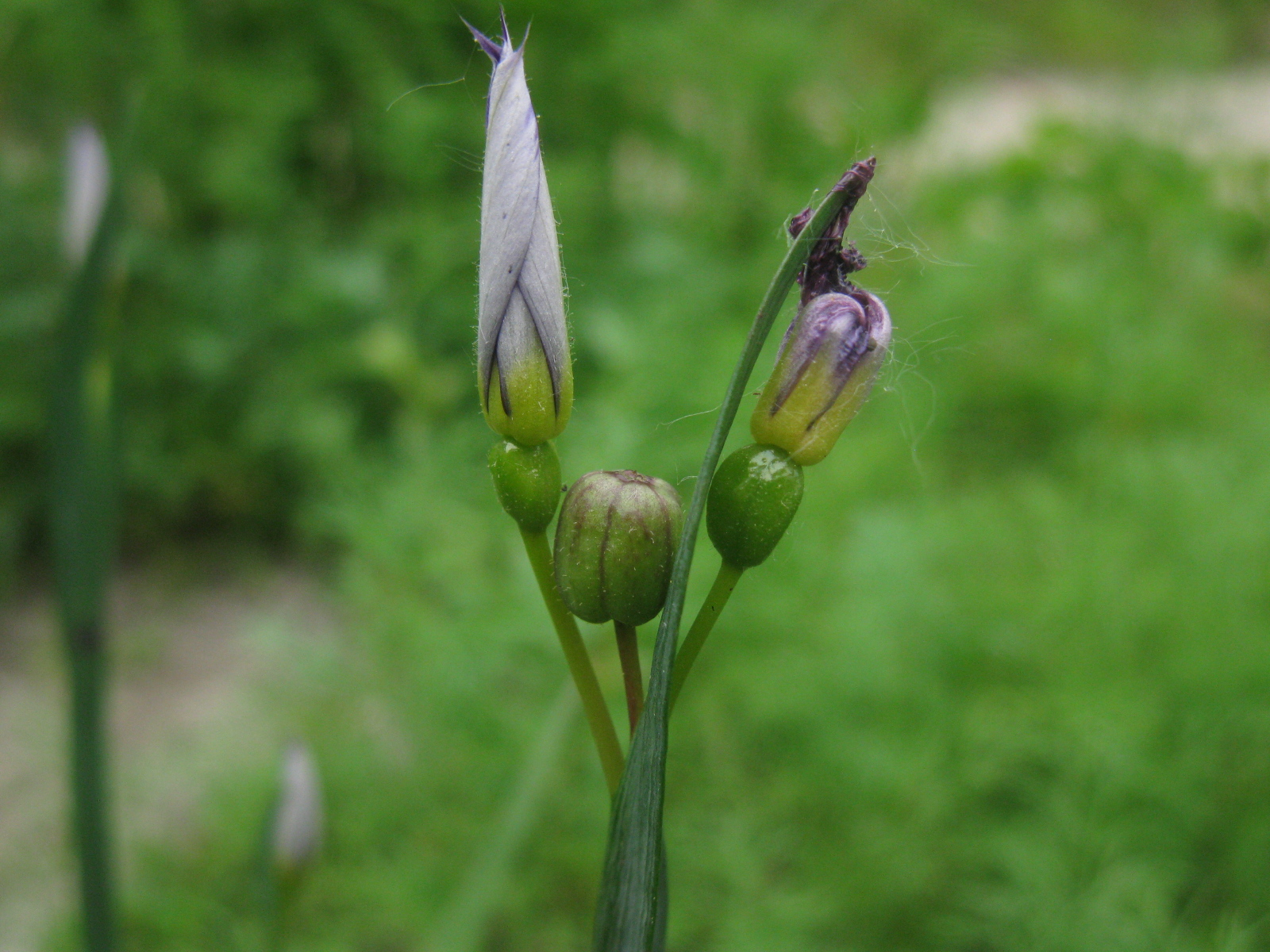
Bud before flowering and immature fruits

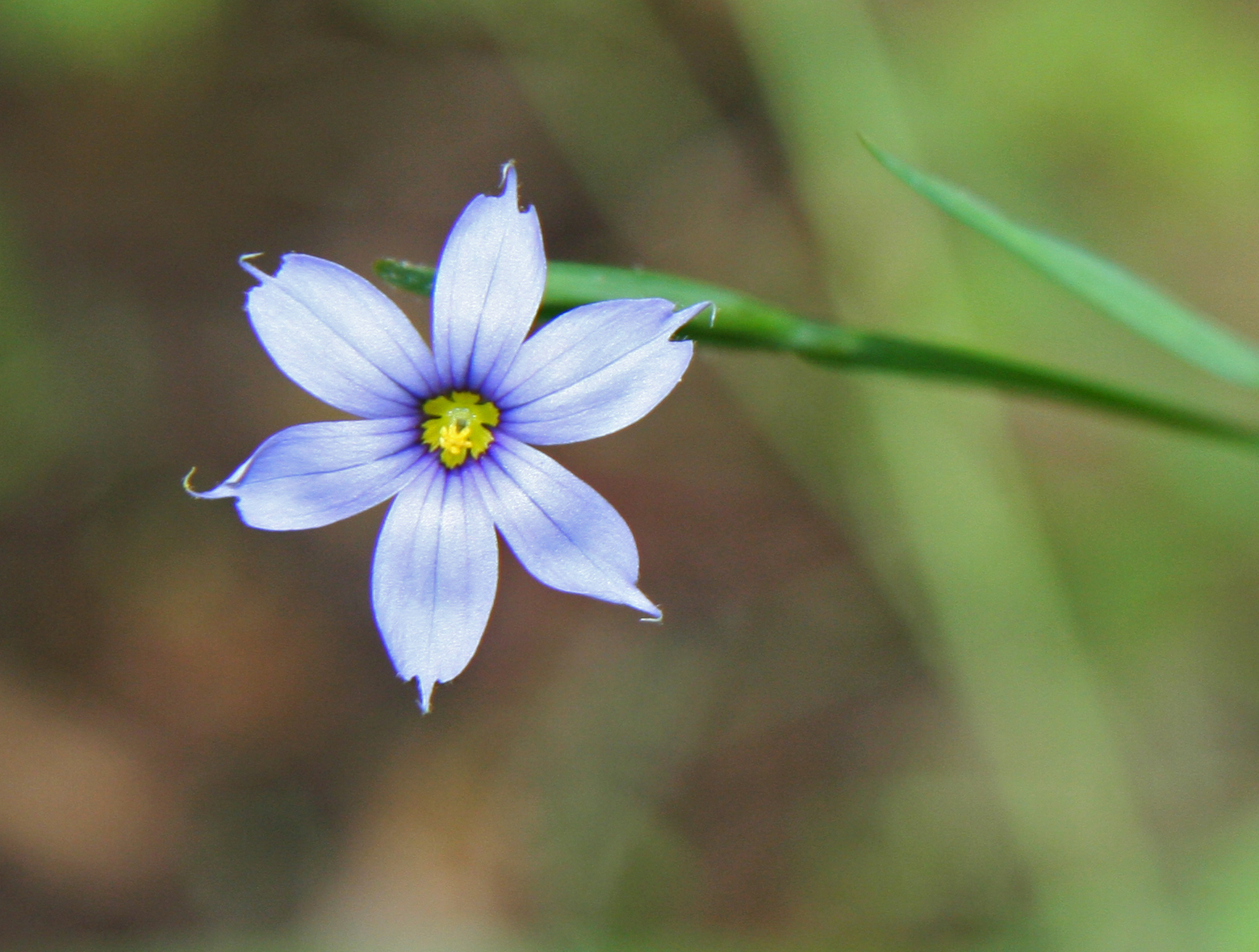
flower, close

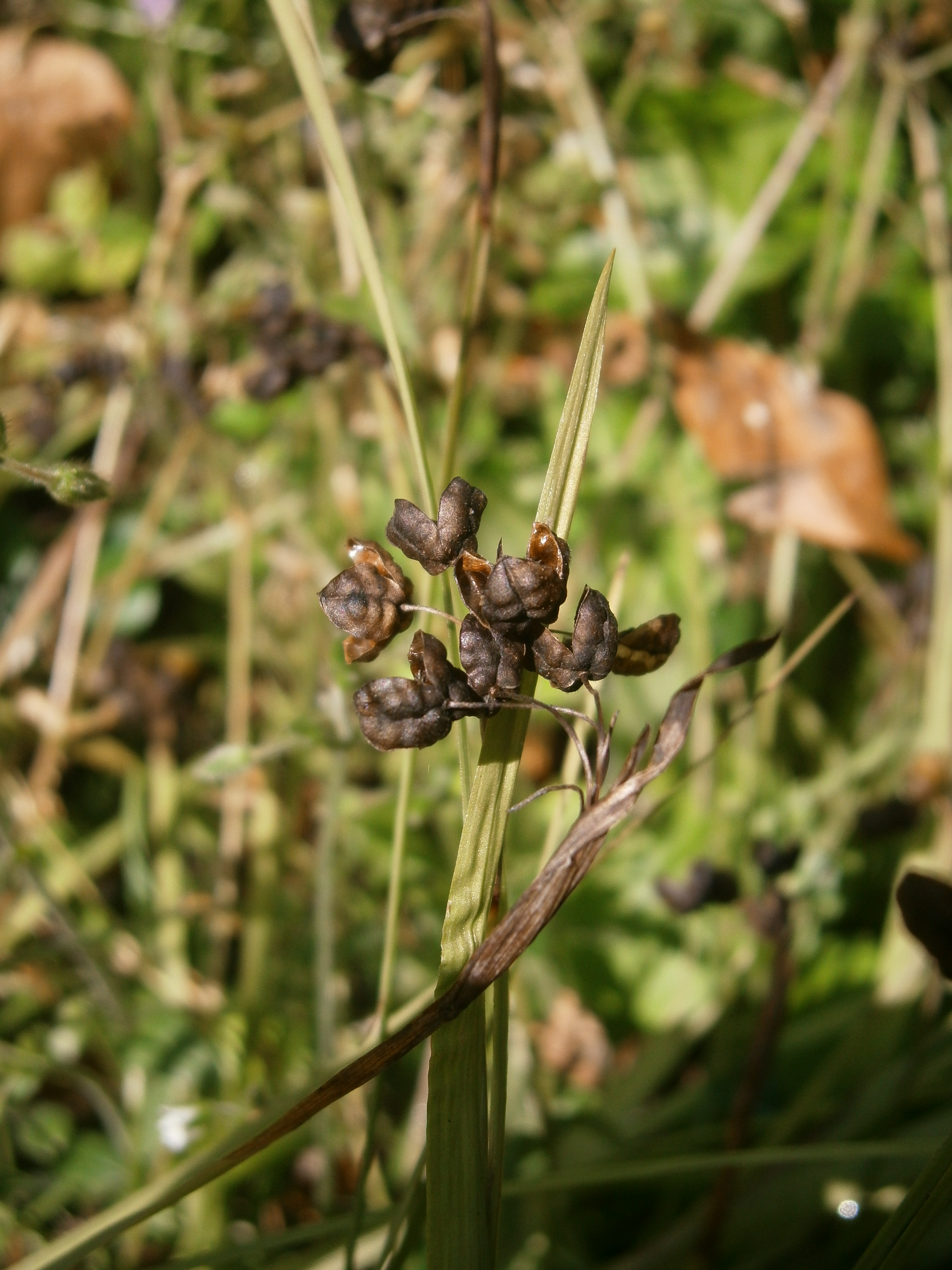
Mature fruits, having released the seeds
