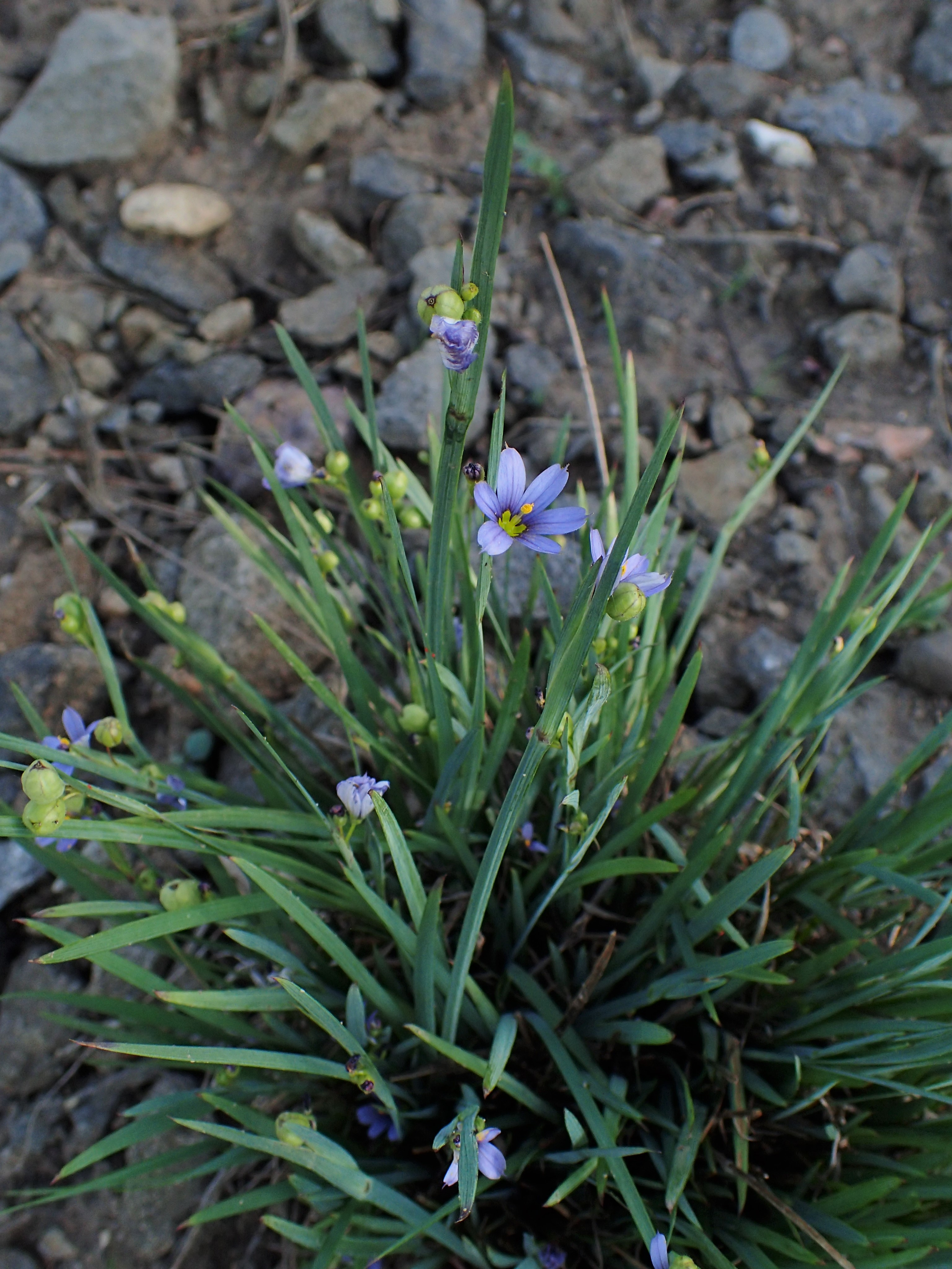
- Sisyrinchium septentrionale

Scientific classification
- Kingdom: Plantae
- Clade: Tracheophytes
- Clade: Angiosperms
- Clade: Monocots
- Order: Asparagales
- Family: Iridaceae
- Genus: Sisyrinchium
- Species: S. septentrionale

Binomial name
- Sisyrinchium septentrionale E.P.Bicknell

Synonyms
- Bermudiana septentrionalis (E.P. Bicknell) Lunell

= Sisyrinchium septentrionale =

Northern blue-eyed grass

Species of grass-like plant

Sisyrinchium septentrionale, the northern blue-eyed grass, is a plant species native to western North America. It has been known from Canada (British Columbia, Alberta, Saskatchewan, and Northwest Territories), and 4 counties in the US State of Washington (Okanagan, Ferry, Stevens and Pend Oreille) and 2 in Montana (Sheridan and Richland).

Sisyrinchium septentrionale is a perennial herb up to 50 cm tall. Flowers are pale blue to light violet-blue, with yellow bases.
