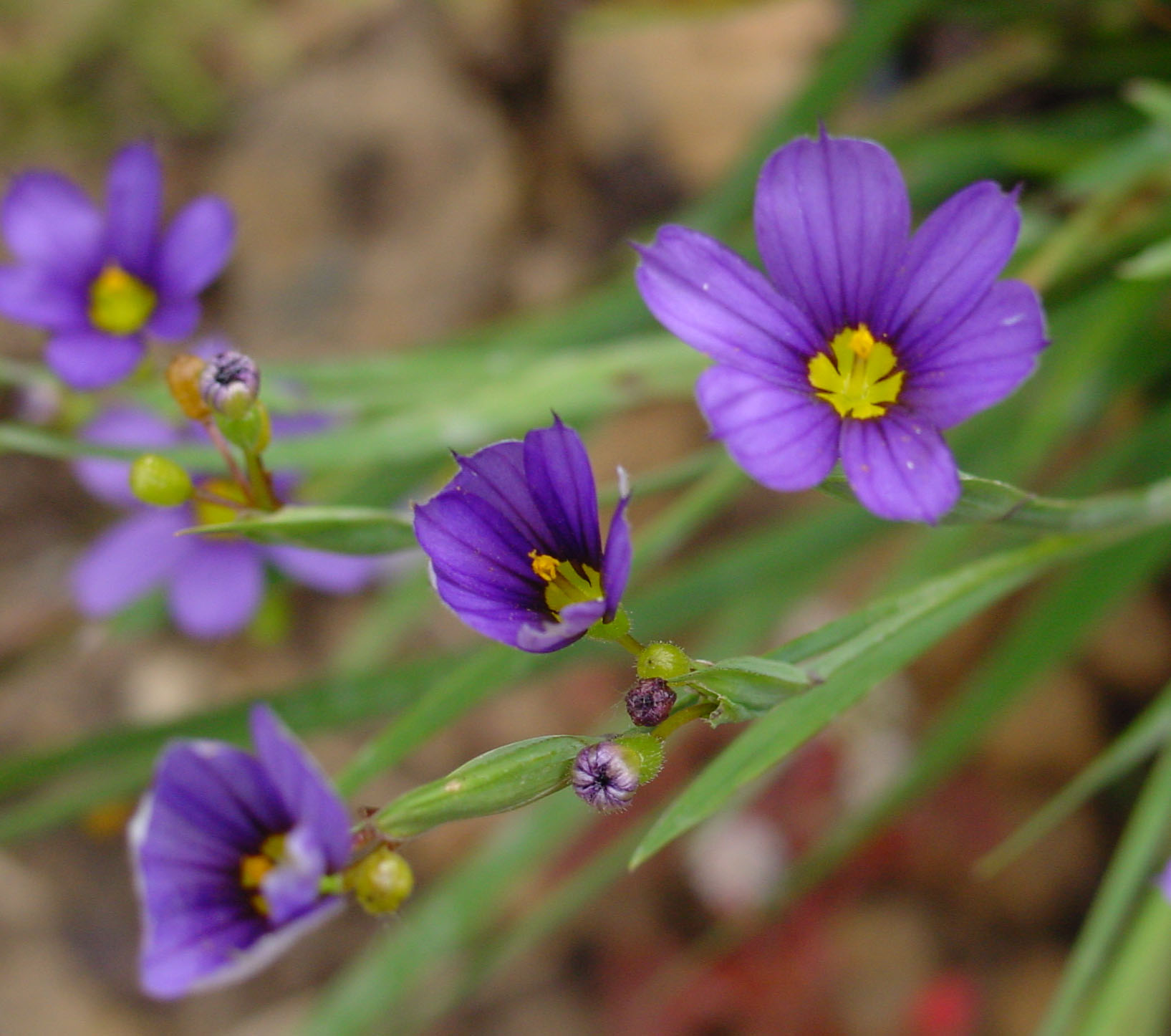
- Sisyrinchium bermudiana L. (type species)

Scientific classification
- Kingdom: Plantae
- Clade: Tracheophytes
- Clade: Angiosperms
- Clade: Monocots
- Order: Asparagales
- Family: Iridaceae
- Subfamily: Iridoideae
- Tribe: Sisyrinchieae
- Genus: Sisyrinchium; L.

Species
- Main article: List of Sisyrinchium species

Synonyms
- Bermudiana Mill.; Hydastylus Dryand. ex Salisb.; Souza Vell.; Paneguia Raf.; Pogadelpha Raf.; Echthronema Herb.; Eriphilema Herb.; Glumosia Herb.; Oreolirion E.P.Bicknell

= Sisyrinchium =

Genus of flowering plants in the iris family

Sisyrinchium is a large genus of annual to perennial flowering plants in the family Iridaceae. Native to the New World, the species are known as blue-eyed grasses. Although they are not true grasses (Poaceae), they are monocots.

Several species in the eastern United States are threatened or endangered. This may be due to niche species emerging from their unique tendency toward rapid speciation which helps them adapt to specialized arenic (sandy) habitats.

== Description ==
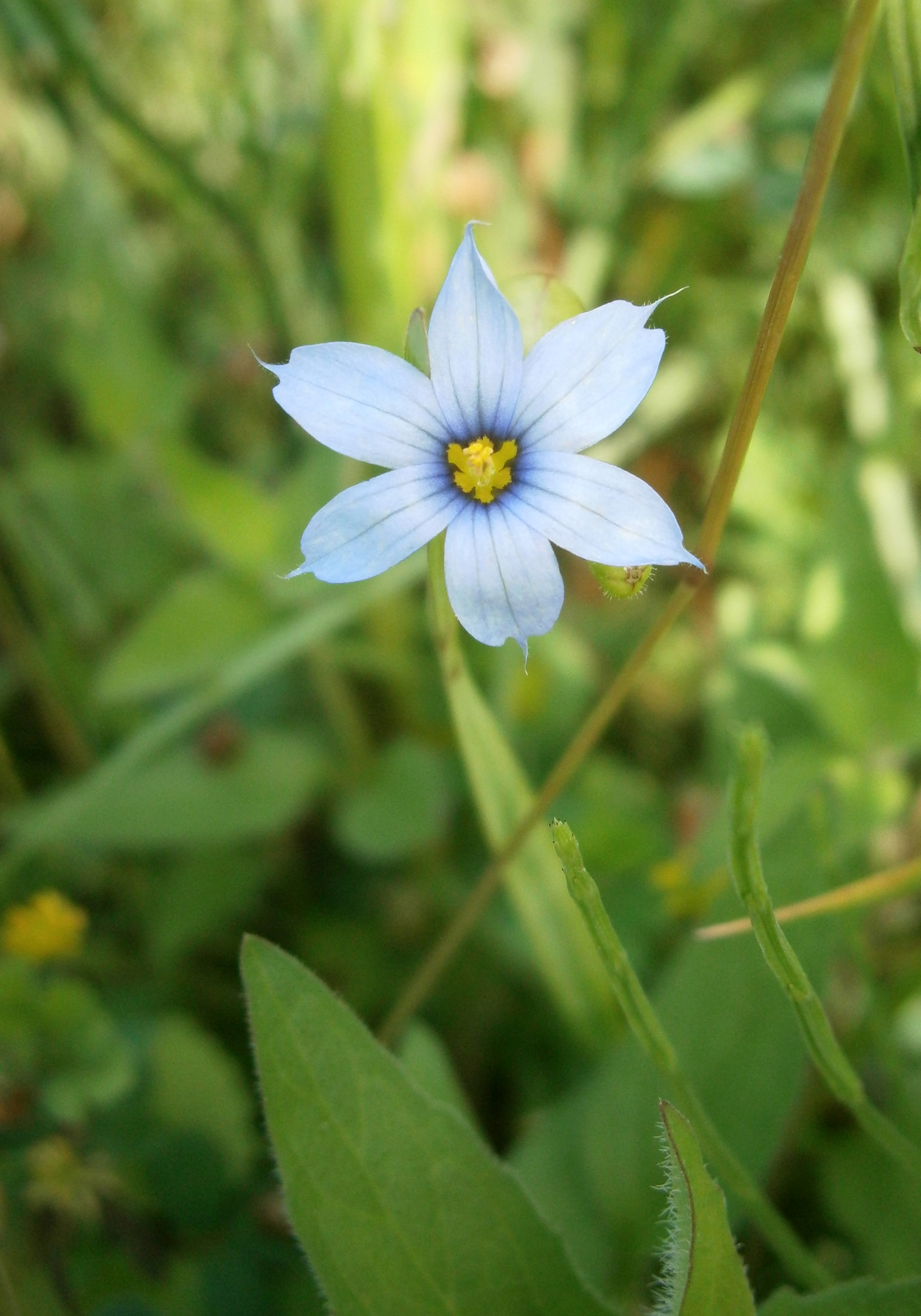
Sisyrinchium angustifolium

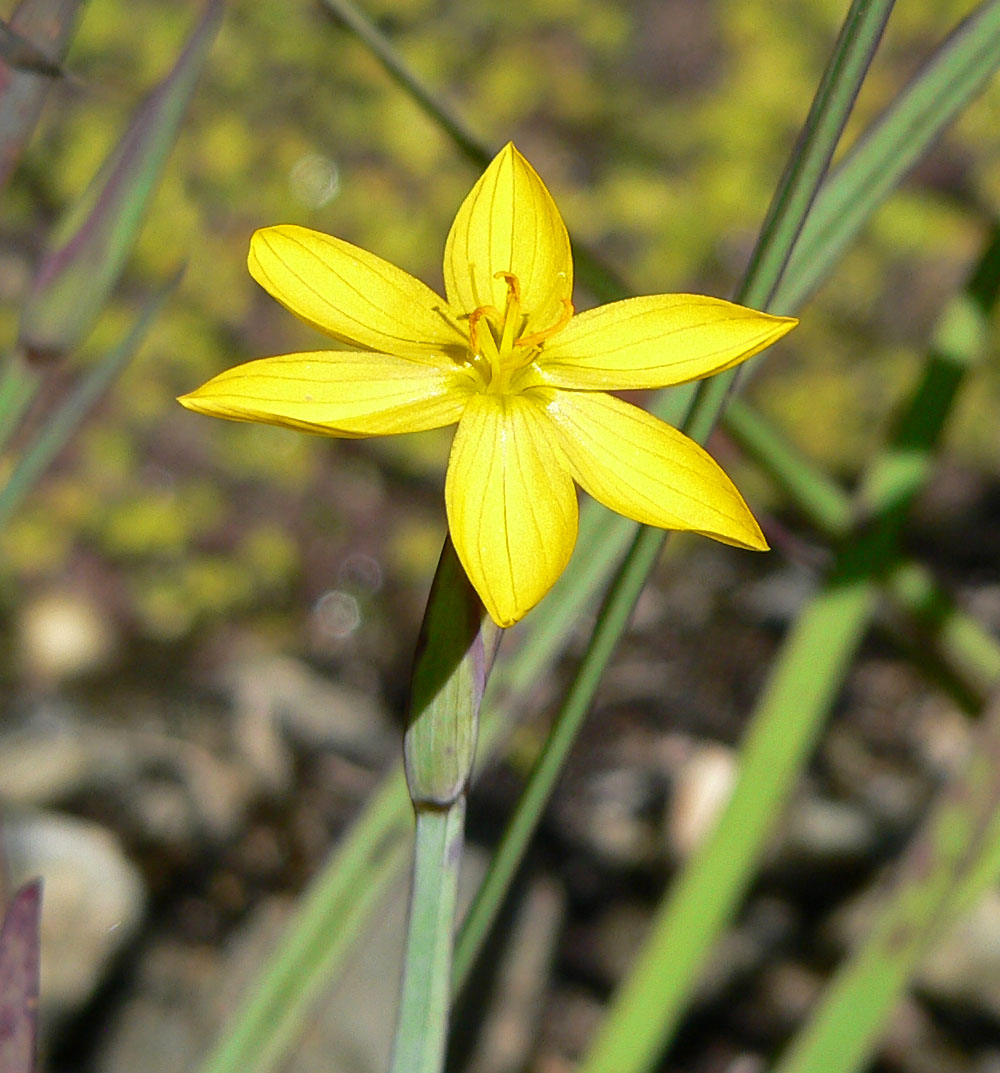
Sisyrinchium californicum

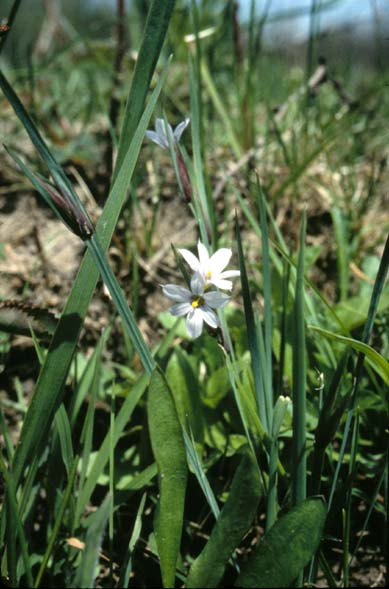
Sisyrinchium albidum

These are not true grasses, but many species have the general appearance of grasses, as they are low-growing plants with long, thin leaves. They often grow on grasslands. Many species resemble irises, to which they are more closely related. Most species grow as perennial plants, from a rhizome, though some are short-lived (e.g. Sisyrinchium striatum), and some are annuals (e.g. Sisyrinchium iridifolium).

The flowers are relatively simple and often grow in clusters.

Many species, particularly the South American ones, are not blue, despite the common name. The genus includes species with blue, white, yellow, and purple petals, often with a contrasting centre. Of the species in the United States, the western blue-eyed grass (Sisyrinchium bellum) is sometimes found with white flowers, while the California golden-eyed grass (Sisyrinchium californicum) has yellow flowers.

== Taxonomy ==
The genus was named by Carl Linnaeus in 1753, based on the species Sisyrinchium bermudiana (commonly called Bermudiana). The taxonomy of this genus is rather perplexing and confusing, as several of these species, such as Sisyrinchium angustifolium, form complexes with many variants named as species. More genetic research and cladistic analysis need to be performed to sort out the relationships between the species. Some species, notably Sisyrinchium douglasii, have been transferred to the separate genus Olsynium.

The greatest diversity for the genus is found in South America.

Approximately one third of the species in the genus have oil producing hairs called elaiophores to attract oil-bees. Nearly all these species are native to South America.

== Etymology ==
The genus name Sisyrinchium appears to be derived from Sisyrinchíon, the Ancient Greek name for the Barbary nut (Moraea sisyrinchium), a common Mediterranean plant of southern Europe and northern Africa. The Greek name, recorded by Pliny and Theophrastus, refers to the way the corm tunics of that plant resemble a shaggy goat's-hair coat, sisýra. As Goldblatt and Manning explain, "the reason for applying the name to a genus of New World Iridaceae was apparently arbitrary."

As an alternative, authors as early Giacinto Ambrosini in as 1666 give the dubious etymology of Latin sūs "pig" and Greek rhynchos "nose", referring to pigs grubbing the roots.

== Selected species ==
There are 212 accepted species as of 2025, including:

- Sisyrinchium albidum Raf.
- Sisyrinchium angustifolium Mill. – narrow-leaf blue-eyed-grass
- Sisyrinchium atlanticum E.P.Bicknel – eastern blue-eyed grass
- Sisyrinchium bellum S.Watson – western blue-eyed grass or Californian blue-eyed grass
- Sisyrinchium bermudiana – bermudiana
- Sisyrinchium californicum – golden blue-eyed grass, yellow-eyed-grass, and golden-eyed-grass
- Sisyrinchium campestre Bickn.
- Sisyrinchium dichotomum – wishbone blue-eyed grass, white irisette, and reflexed blue-eyed grass
- Sisyrinchium elmeri – Elmer's blue-eyed grass
- Sisyrinchium funereum – Funeral Mountain blue-eyed grass and Death Valley blue-eyed-grass
- Sisyrinchium groenlandicum – Greenland blue-eyed grass
- Sisyrinchium halophilum – Nevada blue-eyed grass
- Sisyrinchium idahoense Bickn. – Idaho blue-eyed grass
- Sisyrinchium longipes – timberland blue-eyed grass
- Sisyrinchium micranthum – annual blue-eyed grass, blue pigroot, fairy stars, and striped rush-leaf
- Sisyrinchium montanum Greene – strict blue-eyed grass, American blue-eyed-grass
- Sisyrinchium platense I.M.Johnst
- Sisyrinchium pruinosum – spotted blue-eyed grass or dotted blue-eyed grass
- Sisyrinchium sarmentosum – mountain blue-eyed grass and pale blue-eyed-grass
- Sisyrinchium septentrionale – northern blue-eyed grass
- Sisyrinchium striatum – pale yellow-eyed-grass or satin flower

== Gallery ==
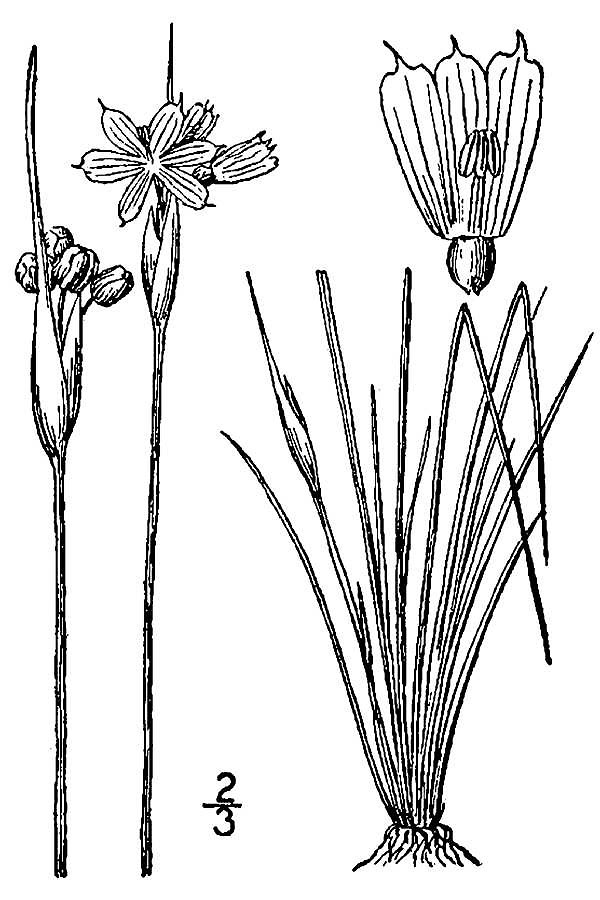
Prairie blue-eyed grass (Sisyrinchium campestre)

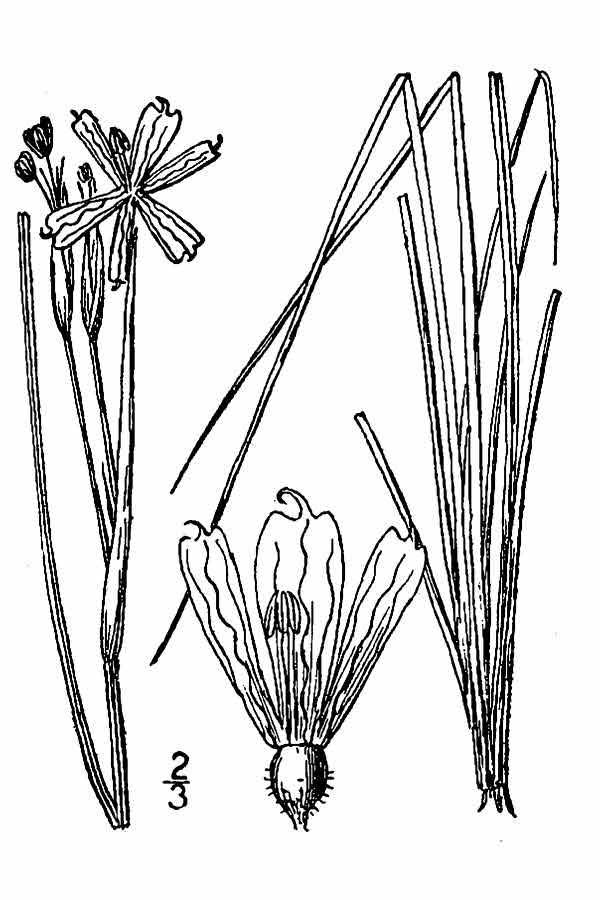
Strict blue-eyed grass (Sisyrinchium montanum var. montanum)

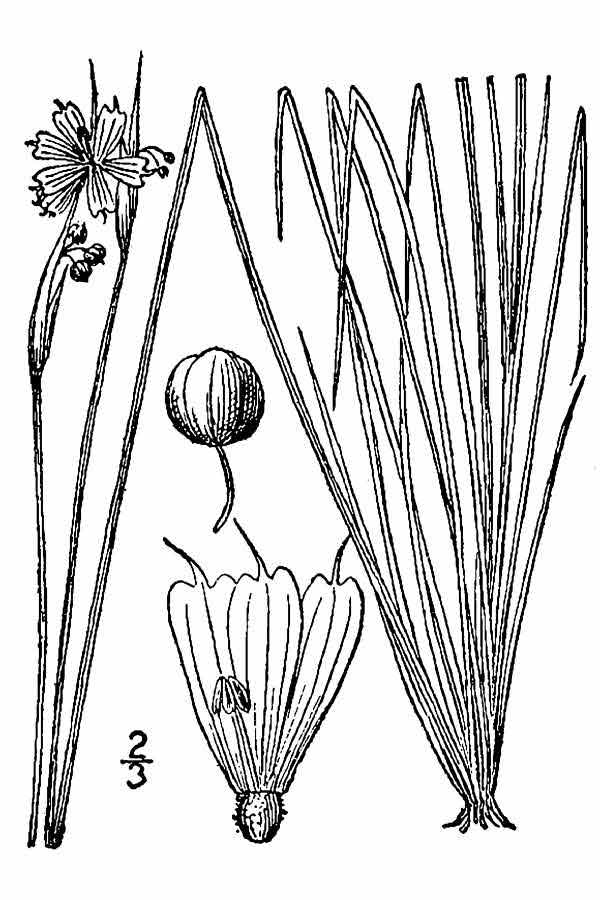
Needletip blue-eyed grass (Sisyrinchium mucronatum)

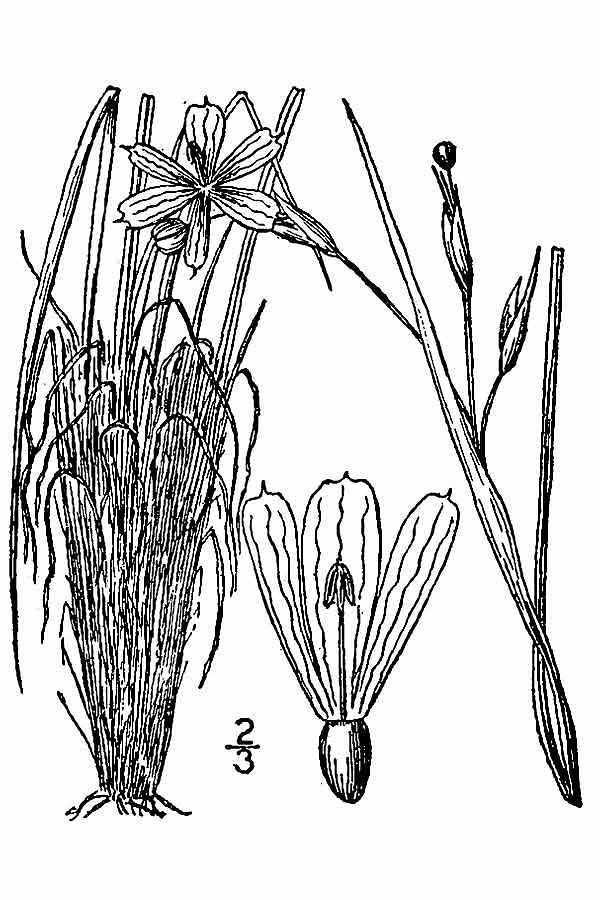
Coastalplain blue-eyed grass (Sisyrinchium fuscatum)

Narrow-leaved Sisyrinchium (Sisyrinchium Tenuifolium), botanical print from the Curtis's Botanical Magazine, 1822

== Sources ==
- Ajilvsgi, Geyata (1984), Wildflowers of Texas, ISBN 978-0940672734
- Ambrosini, Giacinto (1666), Phytologiae
- Chauveau, Olivier; Eggers, Lilian; Raquin, Christian; Silvério, Adriano; Brown, Spencer; Couloux, Arnaud; Cruaud, Corine; Kaltchuk-Santos, Eliane; Yockteng, Roxana; Souza-Chies, Tatiana T.; Nadot, Sophie (2011). "Evolution of oil-producing trichomes in Sisyrinchium (Iridaceae): insights from the first comprehensive phylogenetic analysis of the genus". Annals of Botany. 107 (8): 1287–1312. doi:10.1093/aob/mcr080. ISSN 0305-7364. JSTOR 43578242. PMC 3101146. PMID 21527419.
- Inácio, Camila (2017). Classificação infragenérica de Sisyrinchium L. (Iridaceae) e taxonomia das seções Cephalanthum e Viperella (pró parte) na região sul do Brasil [Infrageneric classification of Sisyrinchium L. (Iridaceae) and taxonomy of sections Cephalanthum and Viperella (in part) in the southern region of Brazil] (Thesis). hdl:10183/241254.
- Inácio, Camila Dellanhese; Chauveau, Olivier; Souza-Chies, Tatiana T.; Sauquet, Hervé; Eggers, Lilian (December 2017), "An updated phylogeny and infrageneric classification of the genus Sisyrinchium (Iridaceae): Challenges of molecular and morphological evidence", Taxon, 66 (6): 1317–1348, Bibcode:2017Taxon..66.1317I, doi:10.12705/666.4
- Karst, Lisa; Wilson, Carol A. (1 January 2012), "Phylogeny of the New World Genus Sisyrinchium (Iridaceae) Based on Analyses of Plastid and Nuclear DNA Sequence Data", Systematic Botany, 37 (1): 87–95
- Keith, Eric L. (25 January 2022), "Two new species of Sisyrinchium (Iridaceae) from south-central United States" (PDF), Phytoneuron (2022–1): 1–19, ISSN 2153-733X
- Manning, John; Goldblatt, Peter (2008). The Iris Family: Natural History & Classification. Portland, Oregon: Timber Press. pp. 221–225. ISBN 978-0-88192-897-6.
- Ravenna, Pierfelice (20 May 2001), "Revisional Studies in the Genus Sisyrinchium (Iridaceae) – VII", Onira, 5 (12): 54–61
- Rudall, P. J.; Kenton, A. Y.; Lawrence, T. J. (1986), "An anatomical and chromosomal investigation of Sisyrinchium and allied genera", Botanical Gazette, 147 (4): 466–477
- "Sisyrinchium in Flora of North America". Flora of North America.
- "Sisyrinchium L." Plants of the World Online. Royal Botanic Gardens, Kew.
- "Sisyrinchium angustifolium".
