= Eugene P. Bicknell =

American botanist and ornithologist (1859–1925)

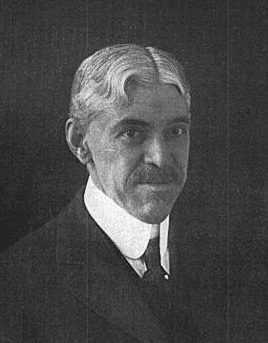
Eugene Bicknell

Eugene Pintard Bicknell (September 23, 1859 – February 9, 1925) was an American botanist and ornithologist.

== Early life ==
Bicknell was born at Riverdale-on-Hudson, the sixth son of Maria Theresa (née Pierrepont) and Joseph Inglis Bicknell.

The family was descended on the paternal side from settlers who moved from England in 1635 and on the maternal side from Sir Robert de Pierrepont who served William the Conqueror before settling in America in 1640. His maternal grandfather was Hezekiah Pierrepont, a prominent merchant and land developer in Brooklyn. Another relative, Reverend James Pierrepont of New Haven had donated his books to form the nucleus of the Yale College Library, which had been founded by Bicknell's direct ancestor, the Rev. James Pierpont.

== Career ==
Bicknell studied at home and worked with the banking firm John Munroe & Co. and Monroe & Co. of Paris. He was interested in natural history from an early age. He wrote an article on the birds of the Hudson Valley in 1878 and in 1882 he wrote about the birds of the Catskill mountains in the bulletin of the Nuttall Ornithological Club. He collected a specimen of a thrush that was described by Ridgway and named as Bicknell's Thrush. He served as a secretary to the American Ornithologists' Union upon its founding and was a member of the Torrey Botanical Club, the New York Botanical Garden and other societies. He published more on plants and discovered several new species. Some of the species were found right in New York and local observers had never noticed the fine differences that Bicknell noted. He noted that there were two species of Helianthemum with a difference that had not been noticed before. This was followed by more species in the genera Sanicula, Sisyrinchium, Scrophularia, and Agrimonia. Bicknell's works include Review of the Summer Birds of Part of the Catskill Mountains (1882) and The Ferns and Flowering Plants of Nantucket (1908–19).

== Personal life ==
In 1901, Bicknell married Edith Babcock at Riverdale. She was a daughter of Charles Henry Phelps Babcock and Cornelia Fulton (née Franklin) Babcock. Together, they had two daughters and moved to Long Island.

He died at his home in Hewlett on Long Island on February 9, 1925. His plant collections were gifted by his wife to the New York Botanical Garden.

The standard author abbreviation E.P.Bicknell is used to indicate this person as the author when citing a botanical name.

== Named in Bicknell's honor ==
He is commemorated in the names of a number of plants and animals;

=== Plants ===
According to International Plant Names Index, (as of May 2021) there are at least 7 plants are named in honour of Eugene Pintard Bicknell (as bicknellii )

- Carex bicknellii Britton
- Crataegus bicknellii Eggl.
- Crocanthemum bicknellii Janch.
- Geranium bicknellii Britton, Bicknell's cranesbill
- Panicum bicknellii Nash

=== Animals ===
- Catharus bicknelli Ridgway Bicknell's thrush
