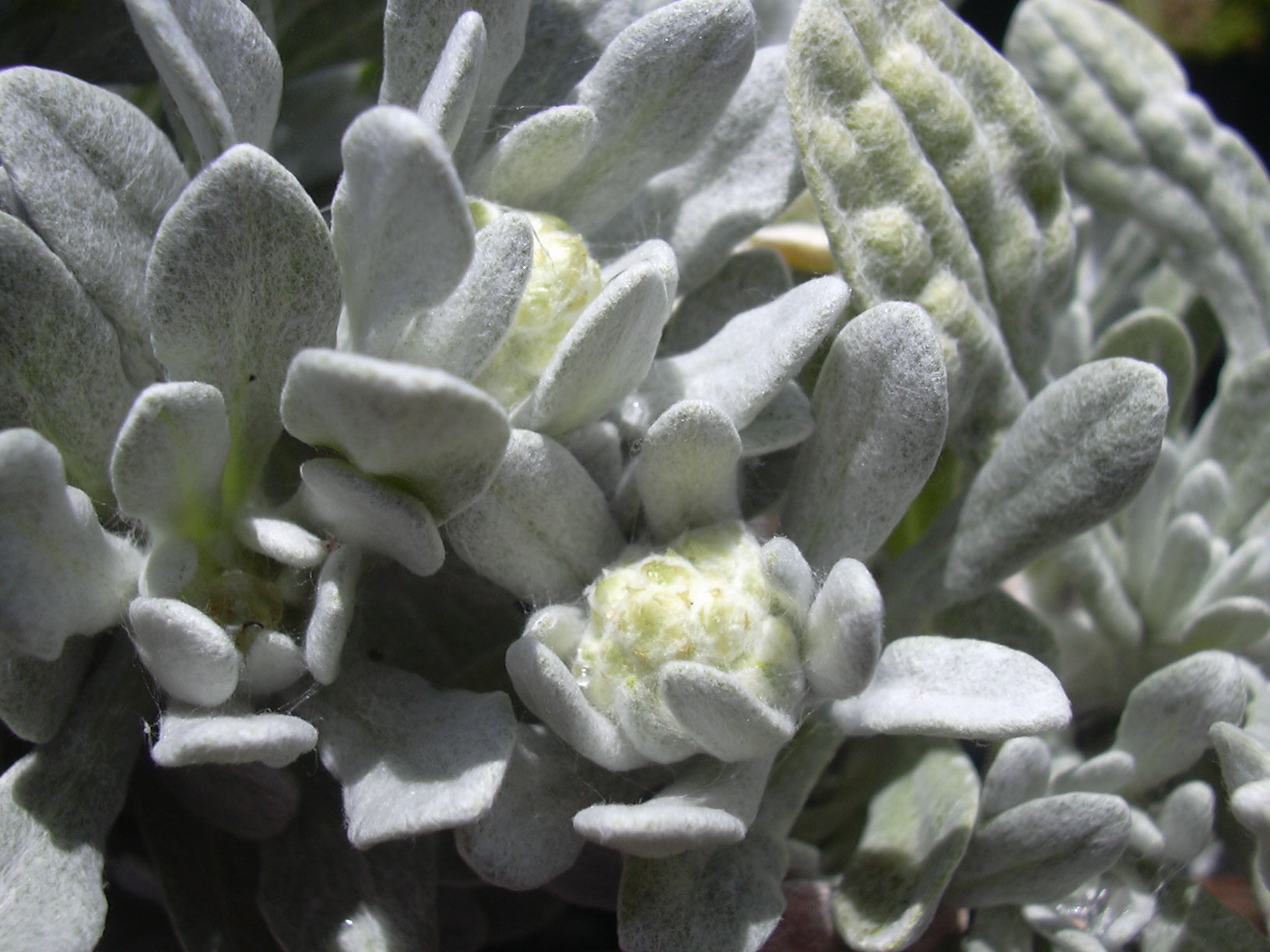

Scientific classification
- Kingdom: Plantae
- Clade: Tracheophytes
- Clade: Angiosperms
- Clade: Eudicots
- Clade: Asterids
- Order: Asterales
- Family: Asteraceae
- Subfamily: Asteroideae
- Tribe: Gnaphalieae
- Genus: Gnaphalium; L. (1753) not Adans. (1763)

Type species
- Gnaphalium luteoalbum L.

Synonyms
- Filaginella Opiz; Gnaphalium sect. Synchaeta (Kirp.) Kirp.; Gnaphalium sect. Omalotheca (Cass.) Endl.; Homognaphalium Kirp.; Gnaphalium sect. Eugnaphalium DC.; Synchaeta Kirp.; Dasyranthus Raf. ex Steud.; Gnaphalion St.-Lag.; Demidium DC.; Omalotheca Cass.; Dasyanthus Bubani; Amphidoxa DC.; Omalotheca subg. Gamochaetiopsis Sch.Bip. & F.W. Schulz; Gnaphalium sect. Eu-Gnaphalium O.Hoffm.

= Gnaphalium =

Genus of flowering plants

Gnaphalium is a genus of flowering plants in the family Asteraceae, commonly called cudweeds or (formerly) chafeweeds. They are widespread and common in temperate regions, although some are found on tropical mountains or in the subtropical regions of the world.

== Species ==
As of April 2023, Plants of the World Online accepted the following species:

- Gnaphalium austroafricanum Hilliard
- Gnaphalium capense Hilliard
- Gnaphalium chiliastrum (Mattf.) P.Royen
- Gnaphalium chimborazense Hieron.
- Gnaphalium clemensiae Mattf.
- Gnaphalium confine Harv.
- Gnaphalium declinatum L.f.
- Gnaphalium demidium (O.Hoffm.) Hilliard & B.L.Burtt
- Gnaphalium diamantinense Paul G.Wilson
- Gnaphalium diminutivum Phil.
- Gnaphalium englerianum (O.Hoffm.) Hilliard & B.L.Burtt
- Gnaphalium exilifolium A.Nelson
- Gnaphalium filagopsis Hilliard & B.L.Burtt
- Gnaphalium flavocephalum G.L.Nesom
- Gnaphalium genevoisi Emb.
- Gnaphalium gnaphalodes (DC.) Hilliard & B.L.Burtt
- Gnaphalium griquense Hilliard & B.L.Burtt
- Gnaphalium heleios P.Royen
- Gnaphalium indutum Hook.f.
- Gnaphalium limicola Hilliard
- Gnaphalium lycopodium Pers.
- Gnaphalium maclovianum Gand.
- Gnaphalium magellanicum Sch.Bip.
- Gnaphalium nelsonii Burtt Davy
- Gnaphalium palustre Nutt.
- Gnaphalium pauciflorum DC.
- Gnaphalium peguense R.Kr.Singh
- Gnaphalium phaeolepis Phil.
- Gnaphalium pilulare Wahlenb.
- Gnaphalium polycaulon Pers.
- Gnaphalium pseudohelichrysum Reiche
- Gnaphalium puberulum DC.
- Gnaphalium rossicum Kirp.
- Gnaphalium rosulatum S.Moore
- Gnaphalium sepositum Benoist
- Gnaphalium simii (Bolus) Hilliard & B.L.Burtt
- Gnaphalium stewartii C.B.Clarke ex Hook.f.
- Gnaphalium uliginosum L.
- Gnaphalium unionis Sch.Bip. ex Hochst.

=== Some former species ===
- Gnaphalium dysodes → Pseudognaphalium dysodes
- Gnaphalium ecuadorense → Pseudognaphalium cheiranthifolium
- Gnaphalium norvegicum → Omalotheca norvegica
- Gnaphalium sylvaticum → Omalotheca sylvatica

== Formerly included ==
Numerous species have at one time been included in Gnaphalium, but are now considered to belong to other genera: Achyrocline, Aliella, Ammobium, Anaphalioides, Anaphalis, Anaxeton, Antennaria, Argyrotegium, Belloa, Berroa, Blumea, Castroviejoa, Chevreulia, Chionolaena, Chrysocephalum, Dolichothrix, Edmondia, Euchiton, Ewartia, Facelis, Filago, Galeomma, Gamochaeta, Gnomophalium, Helichrysum, Ifloga, Laphangium, Lasiopogon, Leontonyx, Leontopodium, Leucogenes, Logfia, Lucilia, Luciliocline, Metalasia, Micropsis, Neojeffreya, Novenia, Ozothamnus, Pentzia, Petalacte, Phagnalon, Pilosella, Plecostachys, Pseudognaphalium, Pterocaulon, Rhodanthe, Raoulia, Schizogyne, Staehelina, Stuckertiella, Syncarpha, Troglophyton, Vellereophyton, Xerochrysum

== Secondary metabolites ==
Gnaphalium species are known to contain flavonoids and diterpenes. Recently, two unique caffeoyl-D-glucaric acid derivatives, leontopodic acid and leontopodic acid B formerly only known from Leontopodium alpinum (L.) Cass. were detected in various species of Gnaphalium together with similar formerly unknown compounds.

== Gallery ==
Gnaphalium Fruticans, known as Shrubby Everlasting: botanical print from the Curtis's Botanical Magazine, 1816.
