= Gnaphalium depressum =

Gnaphalium depressum may refer to three different species of plants:

- Gnaphalium depressum Nutt., an unused synonym for Lucilia kunthiana
- Gnaphalium depressum Steud., an unused synonym for Helichrysum luteoalbum
- Gnaphalium depressum Roxb., an unused synonym for Gnomophalium pulvinatum
