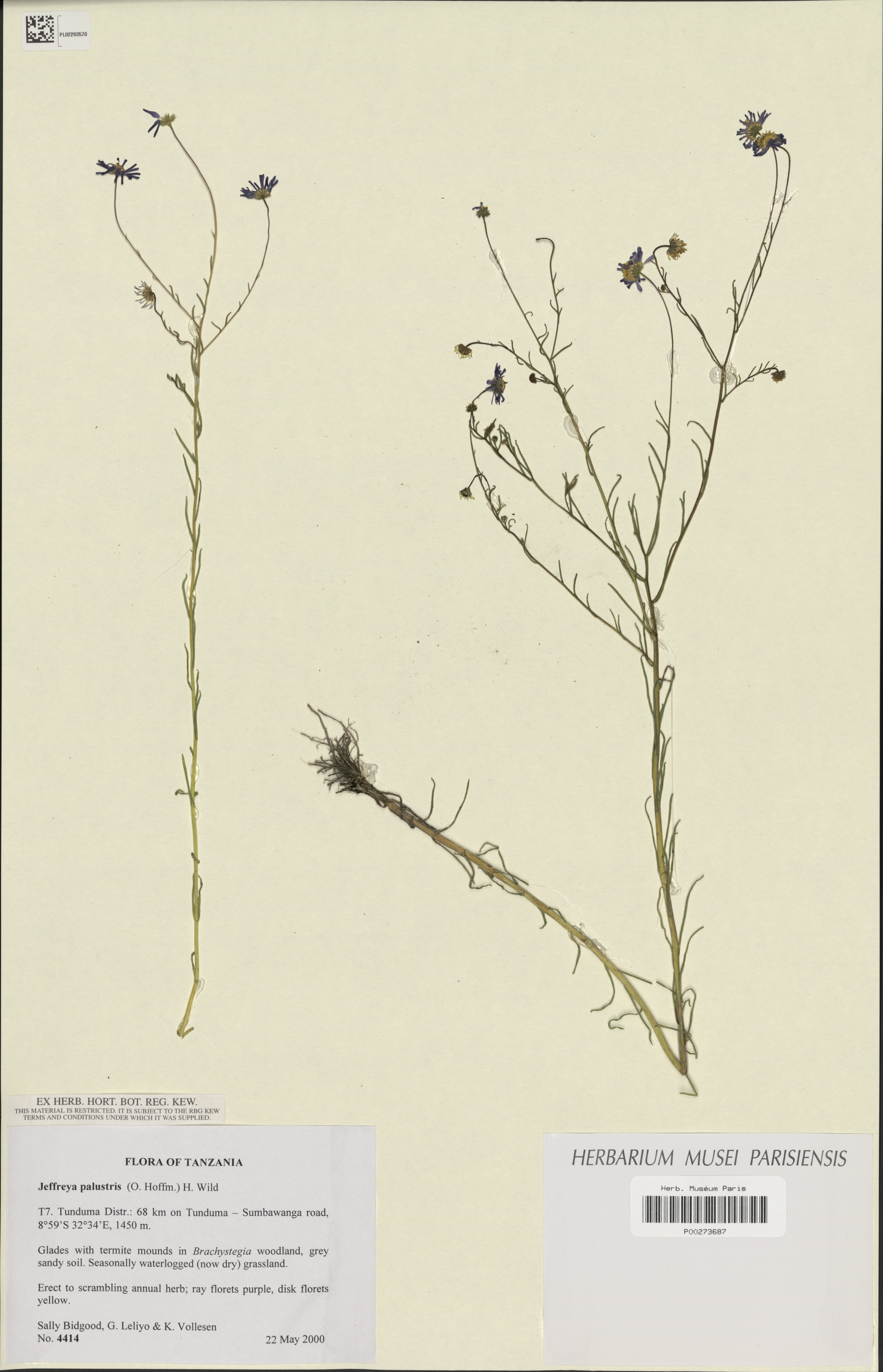

Scientific classification
- Kingdom: Plantae
- Clade: Tracheophytes
- Clade: Angiosperms
- Clade: Eudicots
- Clade: Asterids
- Order: Asterales
- Family: Asteraceae
- Subfamily: Asteroideae
- Tribe: Astereae
- Subtribe: Homochrominae
- Genus: Jeffreya; Wild 1974 not Cabrera 1978

Type species
- Jeffreya palustris (O.Hoffm.) Wild

= Jeffreya =

Genus of flowering plants

Jeffreya is a genus of African flowering plants in the family Asteraceae.

== Species ==
On Global Compositae Checklist;

- Jeffreya palustris (O.Hoffm.) Wild - Tanzania, Zambia, Zaire
- Jeffreya petitiana (Lisowski) Beentje - Burundi

== Taxonomy ==
Species in homonymic genus In 1978, Cabrera used the name Jeffreya to refer to a plant from Madagascar, rather different from the plant to which Wild had already applied the name four years earlier. This necessitated a renaming of Cabrera's species:

- Jeffreya decurrens (L.) Cabrera - Neojeffreya decurrens (L.) Cabrera

The genus name of Jeffreya is in honour of Charles Jeffrey (b. 1934), an English botanist at Kew Gardens with a focus on Chinese flora and also specialist in Asteraceae and Cucurbitaceae.
