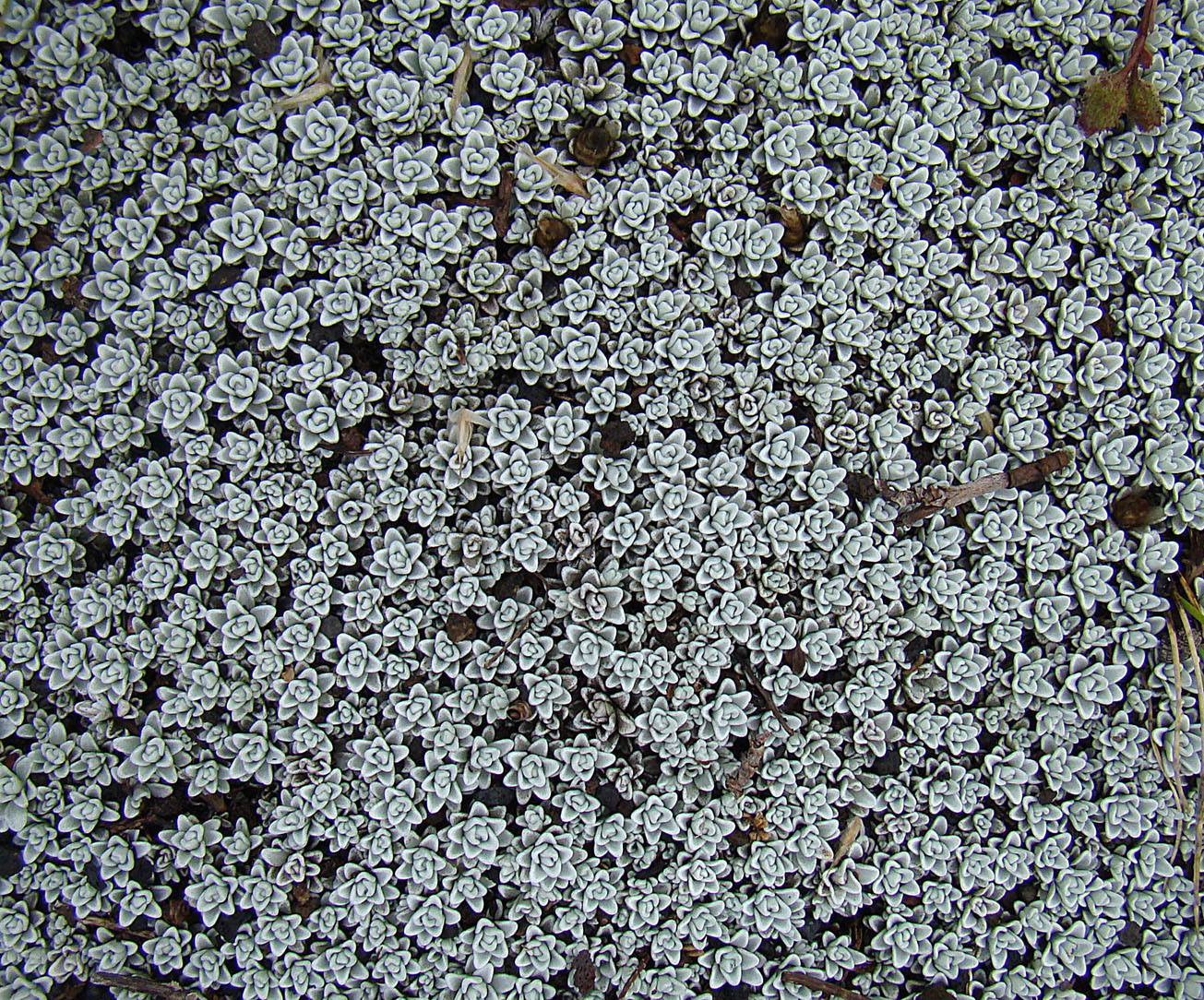

Scientific classification
- Kingdom: Plantae
- Clade: Tracheophytes
- Clade: Angiosperms
- Clade: Eudicots
- Clade: Asterids
- Order: Asterales
- Family: Asteraceae
- Genus: Belloa
- Species: B. chilensis

Binomial name
- Belloa chilensis J.Rémy (1848)

Synonyms
- Gnaphalium frigidum Poepp. (1843); Lucilia chilensis Hook. & Arn. (1835); Lucilia frigida Reiche (1903)

= Belloa chilensis =

Species of plant

Belloa chilensis is a species of perennial herb belonging to the family Asteraceae that is endemic to parts of South America.

The range of the plant extends from Chile in the north down to Argentina and Chile in the south.
