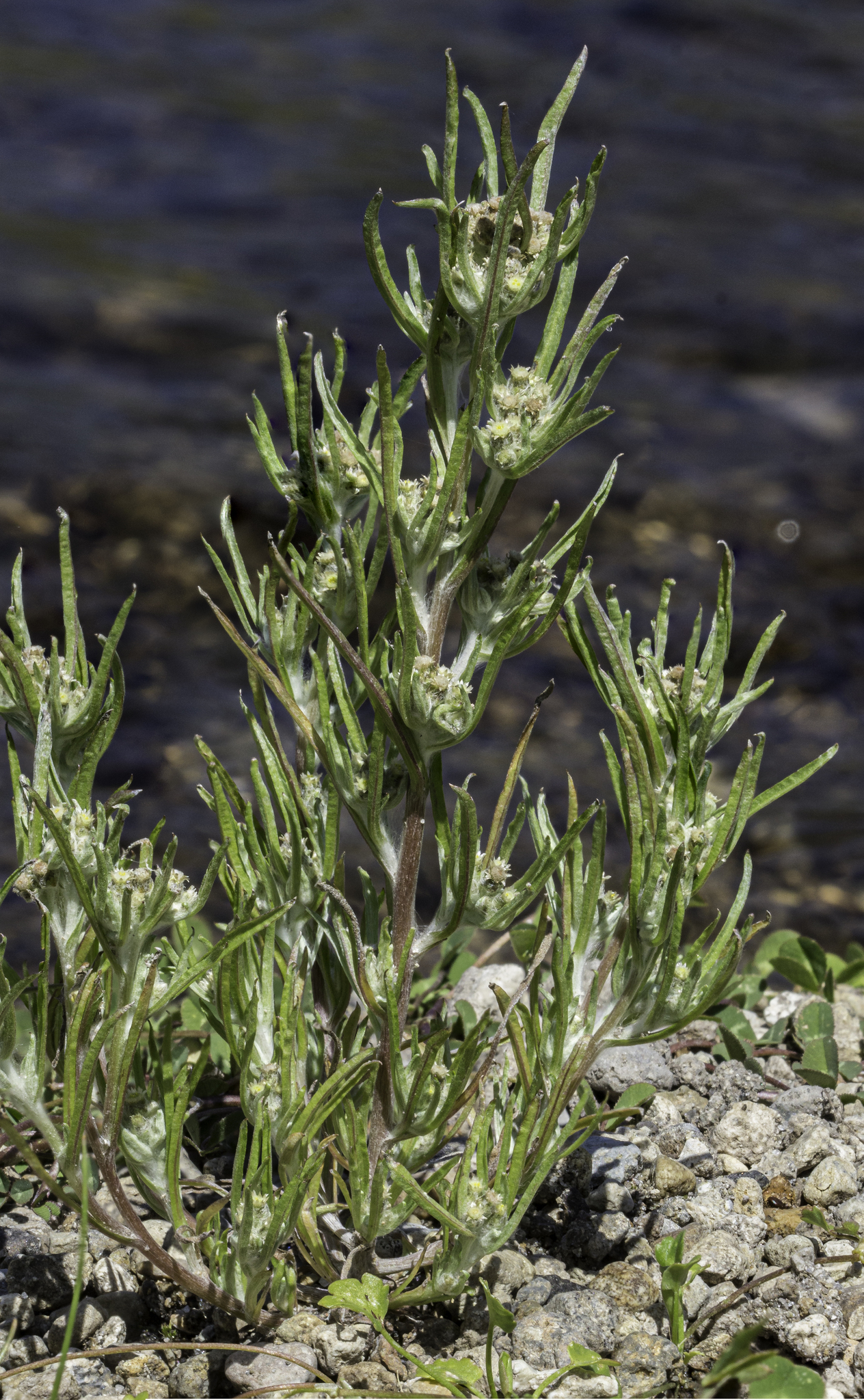

Conservation status
- Vulnerable (NatureServe)

Scientific classification
- Kingdom: Plantae
- Clade: Tracheophytes
- Clade: Angiosperms
- Clade: Eudicots
- Clade: Asterids
- Order: Asterales
- Family: Asteraceae
- Genus: Gnaphalium
- Species: G. exilifolium

Binomial name
- Gnaphalium exilifolium A.Nelson

Synonyms
- Gnaphalium angustifolium A.Nelson 1899, illegitimate homonym not Lam. 1788; Gnaphalium grayi A. Nelson & J.F. Macbr.; Gnaphalium strictum A. Gray 1857 not Lam. 1788

= Gnaphalium exilifolium =

Species of flowering plant

Gnaphalium exilifolium, the slender cudweed, is a plant species native to the western United States and northern Mexico. It grows in hilly and mountainous regions in the Black Hills, Rocky Mountains, and other ranges from the states of Chihuahua, Colorado, Kansas, South Dakota, Wyoming, Arizona, New Mexico and Utah. It grows in moist locations such as lake shores, stream banks, moist meadows, etc., at elevations of 1,400–3,000 m (4,590–9,840 ft).

Gnaphalium exilifolium is an annual herb with several erect to ascending branches. Stems, leaves and phyllaries are covered with a dense coat of woolly hairs, giving the plant a whitish appearance. Leaves are narrowly linear, up to 5 cm (2.0 in) long. Flower heads are born in tight glomerules (clumps) along the upper parts of the stems.
