= Belloa erythractis =

Scientific classification
- Kingdom: Plantae
- Clade: Tracheophytes
- Clade: Angiosperms
- Clade: Eudicots
- Clade: Asterids
- Order: Asterales
- Family: Asteraceae
- Genus: Belloa
- Species: B. erythractis

Binomial name
- Belloa erythractis (Wedd.) Cabrera

Species of plant

Belloa erythraactis is a species of flowering plant in the genus Belloa.
