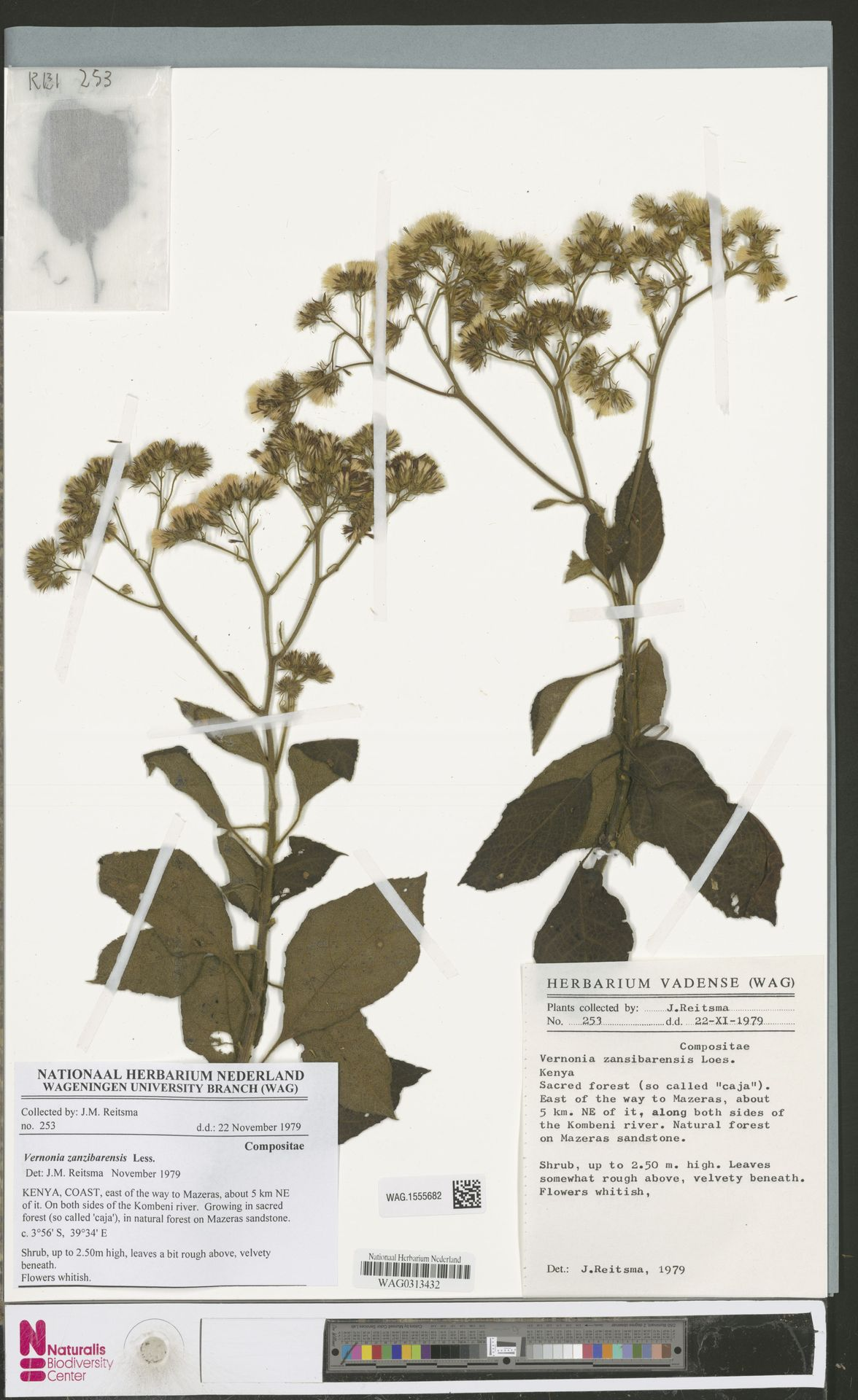

Scientific classification
- Kingdom: Plantae
- Clade: Tracheophytes
- Clade: Angiosperms
- Clade: Eudicots
- Clade: Asterids
- Order: Asterales
- Family: Asteraceae
- Subfamily: Cichorioideae
- Tribe: Vernonieae
- Genus: Jeffreycia; H.Rob., S.C.Keeley & Skvarla

Type species
- Jeffreycia zanzibarensis (Less.) H.Rob., S.C.Keeley & Skvarla

= Jeffreycia =

Genus of flowering plants

Jeffreycia is a genus of African flowering plants in the family Asteraceae. They are in the tribe Vernonieae.

It is native to Tropical eastern Africa and also Sri Lanka. It is found in the countries of Ethiopia, Kenya, Madagascar, Mozambique, Somalia and Tanzania.

== Description ==
Jeffreycia are small to moderate-sized, branching, often scrambling shrubs. They have woody stems, with narrow and solid pith. The leaves are arranged alternate with petioles (leaf stalks) distinct and short to elongated. The leaf blades are ovate to elliptic or panduriform (fiddle-shaped) usually with basal auricles (ear-shaped lobe). They are 2.5 cm (1 in) to about 11 cm (4 in) long and about 1.5–7.5 cm (1–3 in) wide. They have crenated (rounded teeth) or serrated margins and the apices (leaf-tips) are acute to scarcely acuminate (tapering gradually to a point) and rarely obtuse. The upper surface of the leaf is sparsely pilosulous (covered with soft, weak, thin and clearly separated hairs) or hispidulous (bearing long, erect, rigid hairs or bristles). The lower surface of the leaf, is sparsely pilosulous to tomentellous (dense covering of short, matted hairs), with many glandular dots. The leaf has 4–6 secondary veins on each side, with unusual somewhat meandering course, spreading at 45–60° angles. The flowers are terminal (at ends of branches), with branches alternate and usually ascending at 30° angles or less, usually with minute bracteoles (small bracts), sometimes primary bracteoles are larger and foliiform (leaf shaped). The flower heads are crowded at the ends of longer branches, with distinct short peduncles (flower stalks). The involucral bracts (leaves around the flower) are persistent, subimbricate (slightly overlapping) in about series of 4–5 or with differentiated long, linear-lanceolate basal bracts, except at the base. They are smooth outside and without median keel. The receptacle is scarcely convex, epaleate (lacking plates), epilose (without hairs), with proturberant (bulging) scars. The flowerhead has 5–40 florets. The corollas are purplish, 5–11 mm long, with some glandular dots on the outside. They have few or no hairs below tips and a slender basal tube which is half as long as the corolla. The throat (of the flower) is half as long as the limb and about as long as the lobes. The lobes are strictly narrowly lanceolate (shaped like a lance), with sides straight from base to apex and not recurving. They sometimes have stiff hairs at tip. The anther thecae is without glands and calcarate at the base (spurred), with narrow tails. The endothecial (the lining of the cavity of an anther) cells are without obvious nodes. The apical appendages are narrowly lanceolate. The style has a basal node and sweeping hairs with blunt tips, restricted to branches, often lacking for some distance above bases of branches. The achenes (one-seeded indehiscent fruit) are 2–41 mm long, with 4 or 5 poorly differentiated angles, with or without glands or setulae, with scattered idioblasts (cells) on the surface set sometimes in vertical series. The inner cells of achene wall are distinct firm cell walls, containing small sub-quadrate raphids (a seam or ridge on the seeds). carpopodium stopper-shaped or somewhat turbinate and asymmetrical, with many series of sub-quadrate, thick-walled cells. The pappus (tuft of hairs) is white, with inner series capillary (slender), often deciduous, 4.5–7.0 mm long and gradually narrowed to tips. They are somewhat flattened on outer surface and the outer series consists of short persistent scales, minute to 0.5 mm long.

== Taxonomy ==
The genus name of Jeffreycia is in honour of Charles Jeffrey (b. 1934), an English botanist at Kew Gardens with a focus on Chinese flora and also specialist in Asteraceae and Cucurbitaceae. He was the author of the study of the Vernonieae of East Tropical Africa.

It was first described and published in PhytoKeys Vol.39 on page 59 in 2014.

== Known species ==
According to Kew;

- Jeffreycia amaniensis (Muschl.) H.Rob., S.C.Keeley & Skvarla
- Jeffreycia hildebrandtii (Vatke) H.Rob., S.C.Keeley & Skvarla
- Jeffreycia usambarensis (O.Hoffm.) H.Rob., S.C.Keeley & Skvarla
- Jeffreycia zanzibarensis (Less.) H.Rob., S.C.Keeley & Skvarla
- Jeffreycia zeylanica (L.) H.Rob., S.C.Keeley & Skvarla

The African Plant Database accepts 4 species; Jeffreycia amaniensis (Muschl.) H. Rob., S.C. Keeley & Skvarla, Jeffreycia hildebrandtii (Vatke) H. Rob., S.C. Keeley & Skvarla, Jeffreycia usambarensis (O. Hoffm.) H. Rob., S.C. Keeley & Skvarla and Jeffreycia zanzibarensis (Less.) H. Rob., S.C. Keeley & Skvarla.
