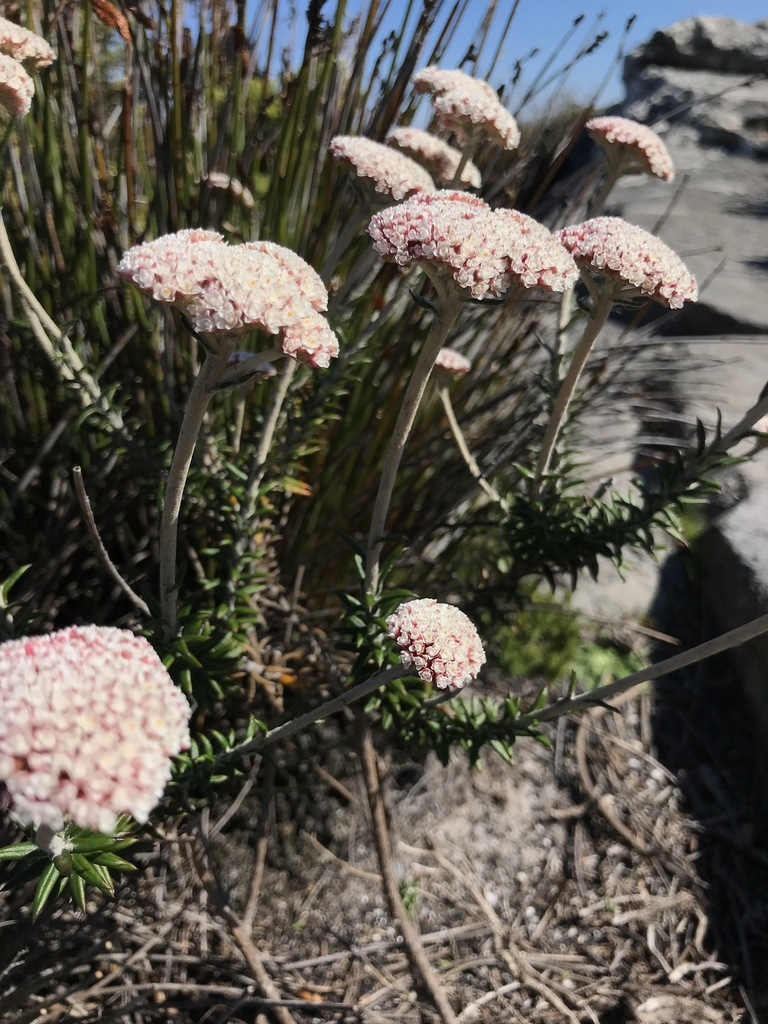

Scientific classification
- Kingdom: Plantae
- Clade: Tracheophytes
- Clade: Angiosperms
- Clade: Eudicots
- Clade: Asterids
- Order: Asterales
- Family: Asteraceae
- Genus: Anaxeton
- Species: A. arborescens

Binomial name
- Anaxeton arborescens (L.) Less.

Synonyms
- Anaxeton arboreum (L.) Gaertn.; Anaxeton floridum Lam.; Anaxeton floridum Poir.; Anaxeton recurvum (Lam.) DC.; Gnaphalium arborescens L.; Gnaphalium arboreum L.; Gnaphalium cylindricum L'Hér.; Gnaphalium cylindricum L'Hér. ex DC.; Gnaphalium floridum Poir.; Gnaphalium recurvum Lam.; Gnaphalium rigidum Salisb.; Helichrysum arboreum (L.) D.Don; Helichrysum arboreum (L.) D.Don ex G.Don

= Anaxeton arborescens =

South African plant species

Anaxeton arborescens, the northern paperposy, is a species of plant from South Africa. It grows in the fynbos biome.

== Description ==
This subshrub has few branches. The branches, which are woolly when young and hairless and marked with leaf scars when older, are closely leafy below and less leafy above. The leaves are linear or narrowly elliptic in shape and have a somewhat pungent scent. They are smooth and hairless on the upper side.

=== Flowers ===
Flowers are most common between August and October. Flowers have, however, been collected throughout most of the year and have been collected between April and December. They are borne in corymbs (flowerheads in which all florets are at the same height despite growing from starting points with different heights). The stalks holding the flowers are usually 5–15 mm (0.20–0.59 in) long and densely woolly. The corymb itself is most commonly 15–30 mm (0.59–1.18 in) wide, although measurements of 10–60 mm (0.39–2.36 in) have been recorded.

The outer bracts are light brown with a dark brown or red apex. They are hairless, although the margins may be slightly woolly at the base. The middle bracts are borne on stalks. They are light brown or light green in colour. The outside is sparsely woolly and the margins very woolly. The inner bracts, like the middle bracts, are borne on stalks. They are most commonly light brown in colour, although they may also be light green. The outside is hairless and the margins are densely woolly.

Each flower contains one female floret. The corolla is 2.5–3 mm (0.098–0.118 in) long. It is often purplish on the lower half. The flower also has four or five male florets. The corolla is of a similar length to that of the female flower and is darker in the lower half. The white pappus bristles are slightly longer in the male florets. They are somewhat flexible and barbed. They fuse to form a ring at the base.

The fruits are achenes - small dry fruits containing a single seed. They are a deep brown in colour and covered in woolly hairs.

=== Similar species ===
This species is similar in appearance to Anaxeton laeve but has smooth outer bracts, while those of the latter are silky. The florets of A. arborescens also have shorter pappus bristles.

A. arborescens also shares similarities with Anaxeton lundgrenii but differs in the number of involucre bracts (15-22 in A. arborescens compared to about 10 and no more than 13 in A. Lundgrenii) and the number of male florets (4-5 in A. arborescens compared to 2 in A. Lundgrenii) as well as having a darker and smooth involucre (darker and hairy in A. Lundgrenii).

== Distribution and habitat ==
This species is endemic to the Western Cape of South Africa. It is common in the mountains between Table Mountain and Constantiaberg. It prefers sandstone slopes and, while it is most common at elevations of 700–1,100 m (2,300–3,600 ft) above sea level, it has also been found growing lower down on the mountain.

== Conservation ==
This species is considered to be of least concern by the South African National Biodiversity Institute.
