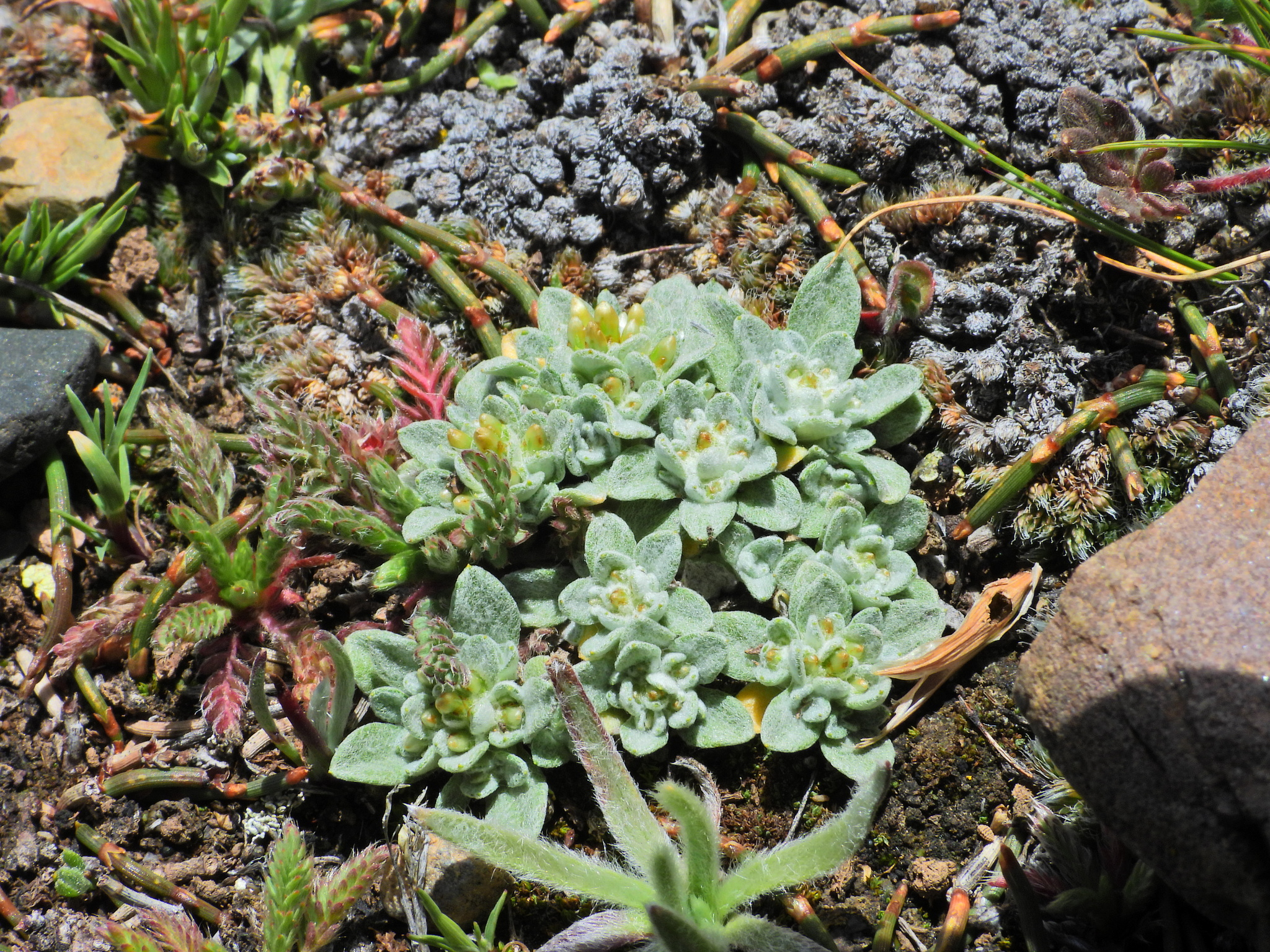
- Mniodes piptolepis

Scientific classification
- Kingdom: Plantae
- Clade: Embryophytes
- Clade: Tracheophytes
- Clade: Angiosperms
- Clade: Eudicots
- Clade: Asterids
- Order: Asterales
- Family: Asteraceae
- Subfamily: Asteroideae
- Tribe: Gnaphalieae
- Genus: Mniodes (A.Gray) A.Gray ex Benth. & Hook.f.

Type species
- Mniodes andina (A.Gray) Cuatrec.

Synonyms
- Antennaria pars. Mniodes A.Gray; Antennaria sect. Mniodes A.Gray; Luciliocline Anderb. & S.E.Freire; Merope Wedd.; Phyllostelidium Beauverd

= Mniodes =

Genus of flowering plants

Mniodes is a genus of South American flowering plants in the tribe Gnaphalieae within the family Asteraceae.

Species

The following species are recognised in the genus Mniodes:

- Mniodes andina (A.Gray) Cuatrec - Peru (Ancash, Arequipa, Cajamarca)
- Mniodes aretioides (Wedd.) Cuatrec. - Bolivia, Peru (Puno, Cuzco)
- Mniodes argentea (Wedd.) M.O.Dillon
- Mniodes burkartii (Cabrera) S.E.Freire, Chemisquy, Anderb. & Urtubey
- Mniodes catamarcensis (Cabrera) S.E.Freire, Chemisquy, Anderb. & Urtubey
- Mniodes coarctata Cuatrec. - Peru (Arequipa, Cuzco, Ayacucho), Chile (Tarapacá)
- Mniodes longifolia (Cuatrec. & Aristeg.) S.E.Freire, Chemisquy, Anderb. & Urtubey
- Mniodes lopezmirandae (Cabrera) S.E.Freire, Chemisquy, Anderb. & Urtubey
- Mniodes montesinosii Quip. & M.O. Dillon - Moquegua
- Mniodes pickeringii (A.Gray) S.E.Freire, Chemisquy, Anderb. & Urtubey
- Mniodes piptolepis (Wedd.) S.E.Freire, Chemisquy, Anderb. & Urtubey
- Mniodes plicatifolia (Sagást. & M.O.Dillon) S.E.Freire, Chemisquy, Anderb. & Urtubey
- Mniodes pulvinulata Cuatrec. - Peru (Ancash, Cajamarca, Puno, La Libertad)
- Mniodes radians (Benth.) S.E.Freire, Chemisquy, Anderb. & Urtubey
- Mniodes santanica (Cabrera) S.E.Freire, Chemisquy, Anderb. & Urtubey
- Mniodes schultzii (Wedd.) S.E.Freire, Chemisquy, Anderb. & Urtubey
- Mniodes spathulifolia (Sagást. & M.O.Dillon) M.O.Dillon
- Mniodes subspicata (Wedd.) S.E.Freire, Chemisquy, Anderb. & Urtubey
- Mniodes turneri (Sagást. & M.O.Dillon) M.O.Dillon

formerly included

- Mniodes tunariensis (Kuntze) Hieron. ex Weberb. - Novenia tunariensis (Kuntze) S.E.Freire
