= Belloa nivea =

Scientific classification
- Kingdom: Plantae
- Clade: Tracheophytes
- Clade: Angiosperms
- Clade: Eudicots
- Clade: Asterids
- Order: Asterales
- Family: Asteraceae
- Genus: Belloa
- Species: B. nivea

Binomial name
- Belloa nivea (Phil.) M.O.Dillon

Species of plant

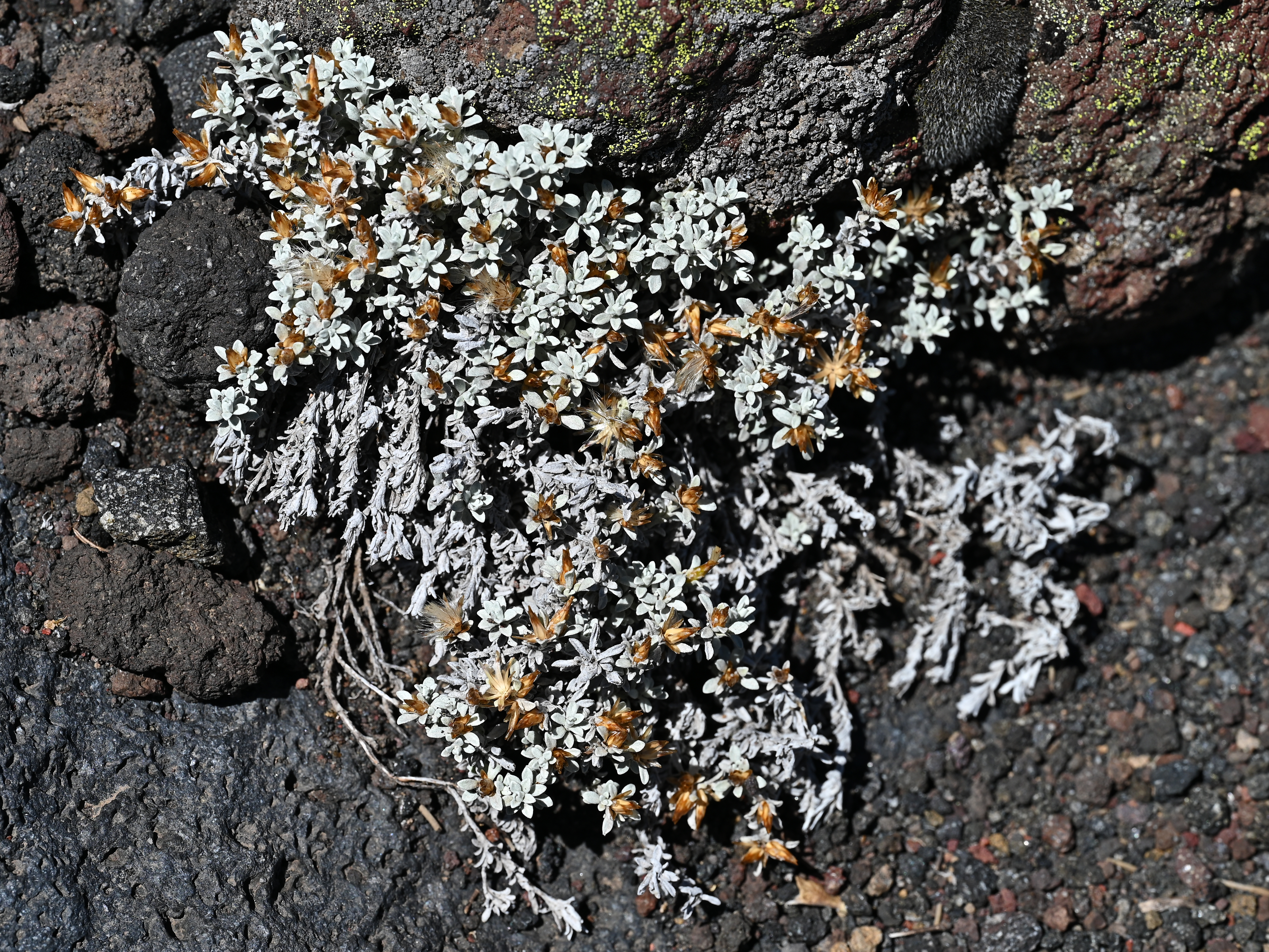
Belloa nivea in the Valley of the Moon, Laguna del Laja National Park, Biobío, Chile

Belloa nivea is a plant native to central Chile.
