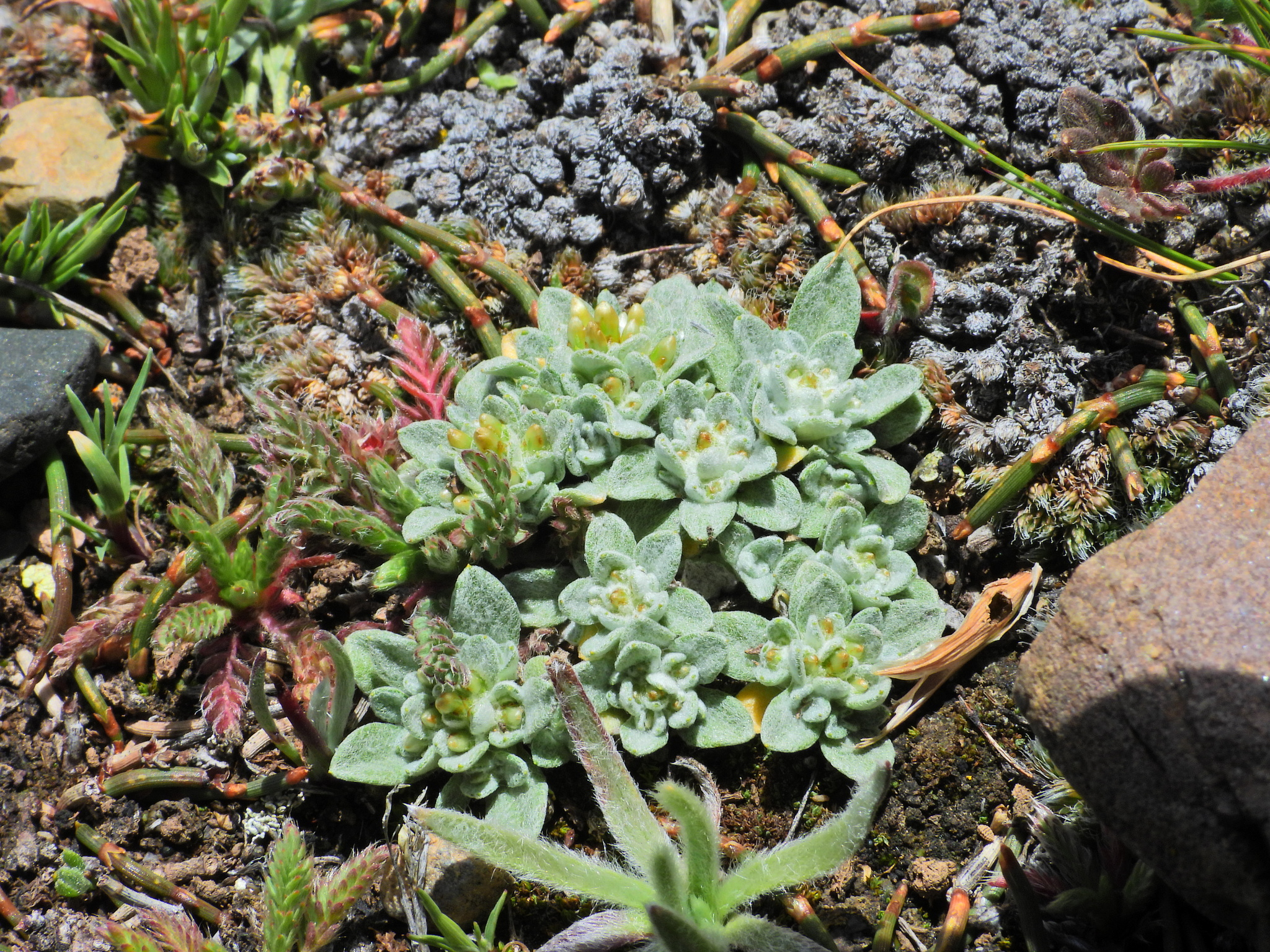

Scientific classification
- Kingdom: Plantae
- Clade: Tracheophytes
- Clade: Angiosperms
- Clade: Eudicots
- Clade: Asterids
- Order: Asterales
- Family: Asteraceae
- Genus: Mniodes
- Species: M. piptolepis

Binomial name
- Mniodes piptolepis (Wedd.) S.E.Freire, Chemisquy, Anderb. & Urtubey

Synonyms
- Belloa piptolepis (Wedd.) Cabrera; Gnaphalium evacoides Sch.Bip.; Gnaphalium piptolepis (Wedd.) Griseb.; Lucilia piptolepis Wedd.; Luciliocline piptolepis (Wedd.) M.O.Dillon & Sagást.; Merope piptolepis Wedd.

= Mniodes piptolepis =

Species of plant

Mniodes piptolepis is a species of plant in the family Asteraceae.
