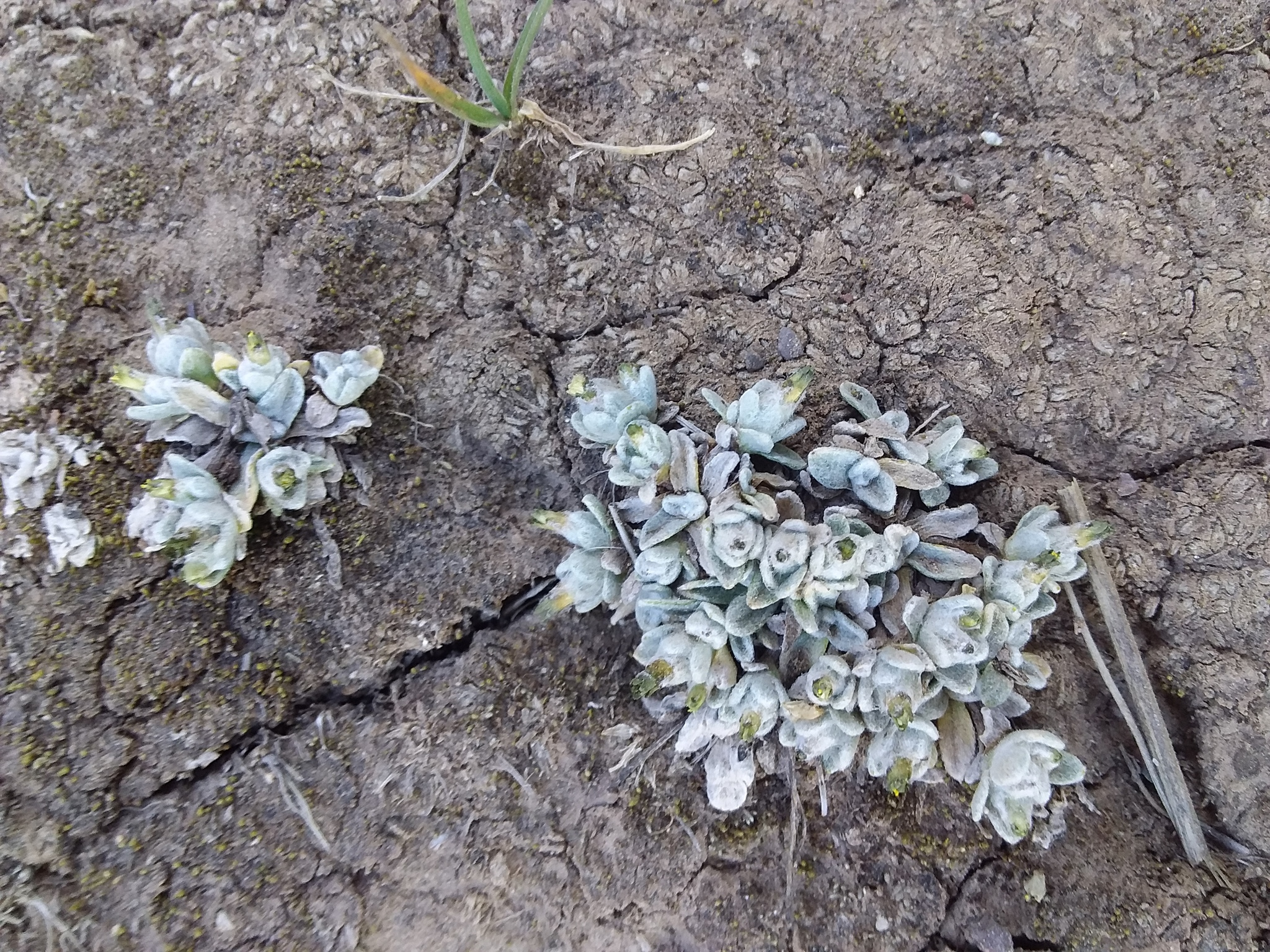

Scientific classification
- Kingdom: Plantae
- Clade: Tracheophytes
- Clade: Angiosperms
- Clade: Eudicots
- Clade: Asterids
- Order: Asterales
- Family: Asteraceae
- Genus: Mniodes
- Species: M. schultzii

Binomial name
- Mniodes schultzii (Wedd.) S.E.Freire, Chemisquy, Anderb. & Urtubey

Synonyms
- Belloa schultzii (Wedd.) Cabrera

= Mniodes schultzii =

Species of plant

Mniodes schultzii is a species of plant in the family Asteraceae.
