= Mniodes plicatifolia =

Scientific classification
- Kingdom: Plantae
- Clade: Tracheophytes
- Clade: Angiosperms
- Clade: Eudicots
- Clade: Asterids
- Order: Asterales
- Family: Asteraceae
- Genus: Mniodes
- Species: M. plicatifolia

Binomial name
- Mniodes plicatifolia (Sagást. & M.O.Dillon) S.E.Freire, Chemisquy, Anderb. & Urtubey

Synonyms
- Belloa plicatifolia Sagást. & M.O.Dillon; Lucilia plicatifolia (Sagást. & M.O.Dillon) S.E.Freire; Luciliocline plicatifolia (Sagást. & M.O.Dillon) M.O.Dillon & Sagást.

Species of plant

Mniodes plicatifolia is a species of plant in the family Asteraceae that is endemic to South America.
