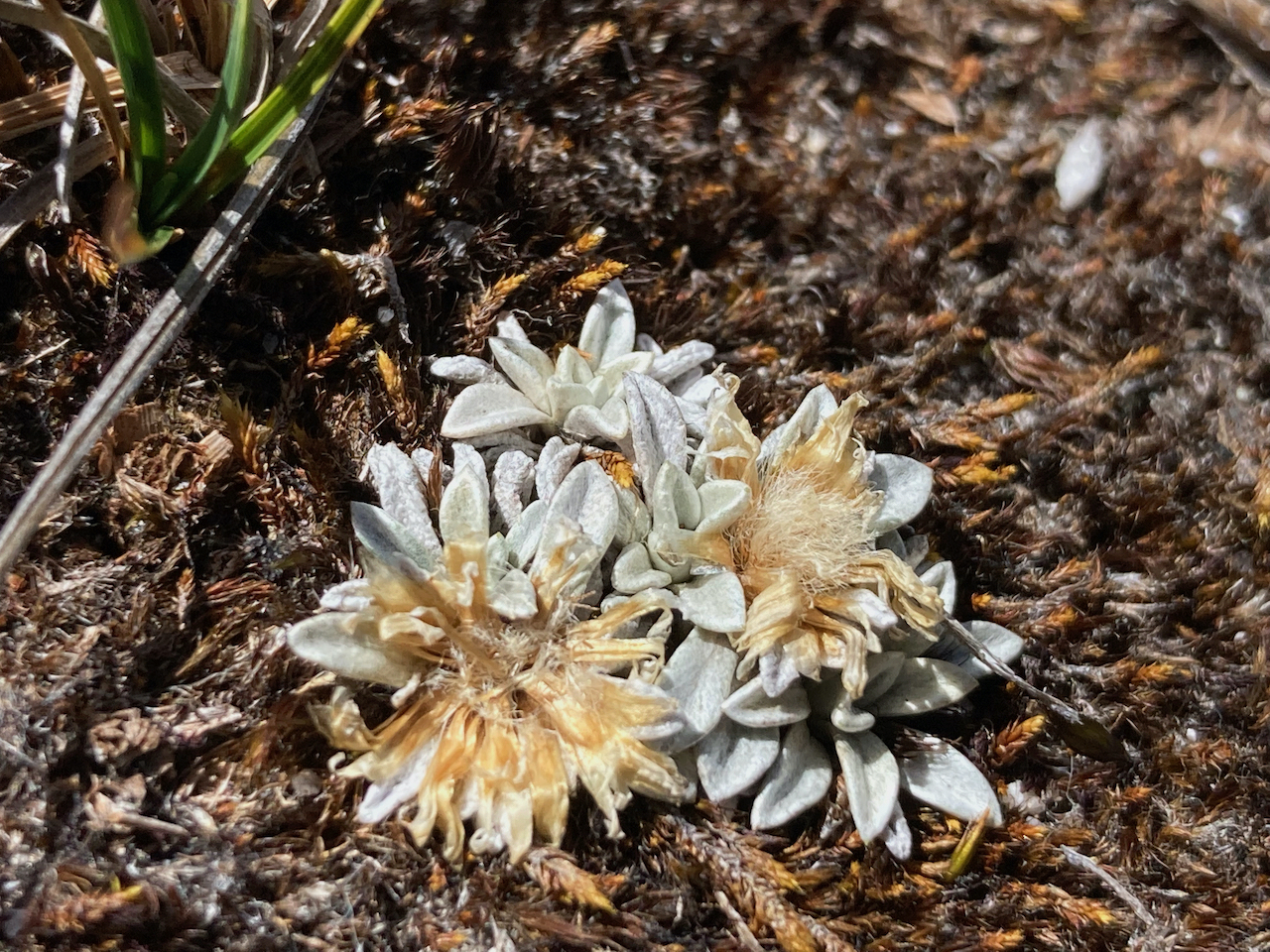

Scientific classification
- Kingdom: Plantae
- Clade: Tracheophytes
- Clade: Angiosperms
- Clade: Eudicots
- Clade: Asterids
- Order: Asterales
- Family: Asteraceae
- Genus: Mniodes
- Species: M. radians

Binomial name
- Mniodes radians (Benth.) S.E.Freire, Chemisquy, Anderb. & Urtubey

Synonyms
- Belloa radians (Benth.) Sagást. & M.O.Dillon; Gnaphalium radians Benth.; Lucilia radians (Benth.) Cuatrec.; Luciliocline radians (Benth.) M.O.Dillon & Sagást.

= Mniodes radians =

Species of plant

Mniodes radians is a species of plant in the family Asteraceae.
