= Charles Jeffrey (botanist) =

English botanist (1934–2022)

Charles Jeffrey (10 April 1934 – 29 March 2022) was a British botanist.

He was born in Kensington, England, and went to school in Walthamstow. During his National service he learnt Russian at the Joint Services School for Linguists. After his National Service he went up to Sidney Sussex College, Cambridge, graduating in 1957.

He then worked as a taxonomist at the Herbarium, Royal Botanic Gardens, Kew, until he retired in 1994. He wrote on Botanical nomenclature and in 1969 translated 'Flowering plants: origin and dispersal' by Armen Takhtajan into English. His main research interests were in the Cucurbitaceae and Compositae. His interest in plant systematics led him in 1982 to propose a five-kingdom classification.

He also collected plants, such in Gabon (1957), the Seychelles (1962/63), Kenya (1963), Mongolia (1970), and Venezuela (1977).

After the International Compositae Conference of July 1994 he moved to St. Petersburg, Russia, where he was based at the Komarov Botanical Institute. He worked with Takhtajan in securing funds to renovate its herbarium and library building. He was on the editorial board of Botanicheskii Zhurnal until 2006.

Jeffrey died in Saint Petersburg on 29 March 2022 aged 88.

The genera Jeffreycia and Jeffreya are named for him.

== Selected publications ==
- An introduction to plant taxonomy. (1968). 2nd edition. Cambridge University Press, Cambridge, (1982), ISBN 0-521-28775-8.
- Biological nomenclature, 2nd ed. London: Arnold. (1977)
- The Cucurbitaceae of Eastern Asia. Royal Botanic Gardens, Kew. (1980).
