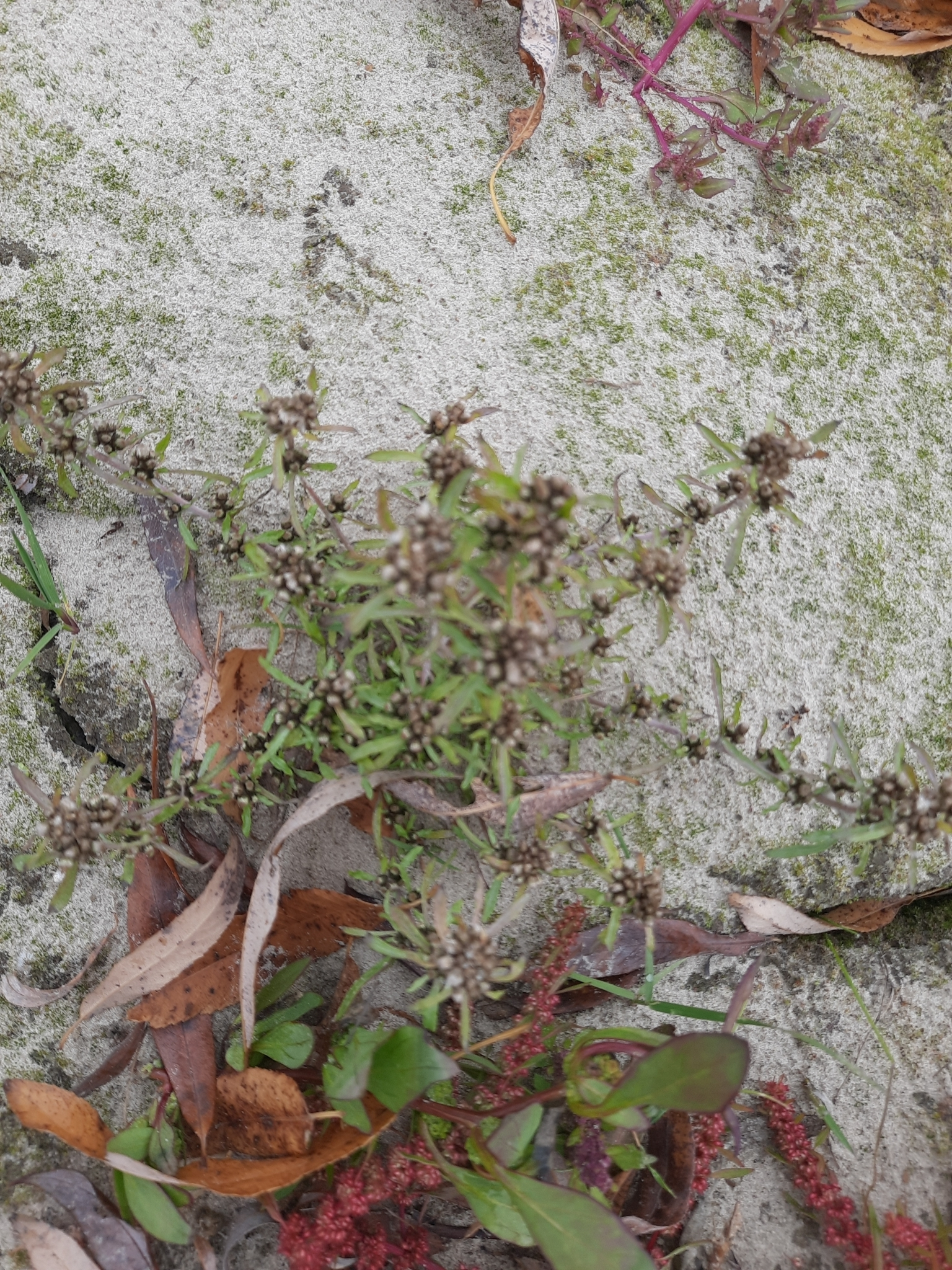

Scientific classification
- Kingdom: Plantae
- Clade: Tracheophytes
- Clade: Angiosperms
- Clade: Eudicots
- Clade: Asterids
- Order: Asterales
- Family: Asteraceae
- Genus: Gnaphalium
- Species: G. pilulare

Binomial name
- Gnaphalium pilulare Wahlenb.

= Gnaphalium pilulare =

Species of flowering plant

Gnaphalium pilulare is a species of flowering plant belonging to the family Asteraceae.

Its native range is from Northern Europe to Japan.
