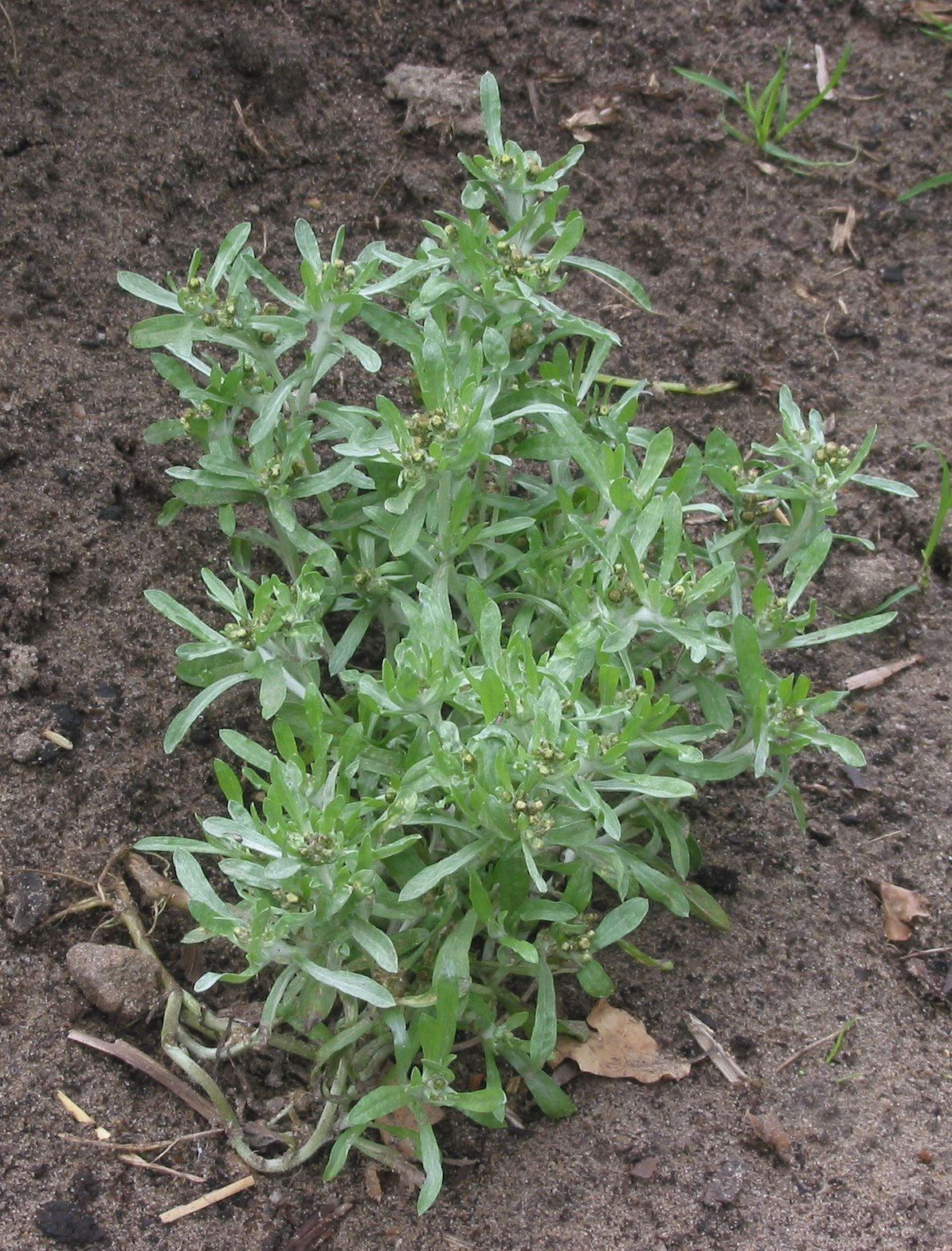

Conservation status
- Secure (NatureServe)

Scientific classification
- Kingdom: Plantae
- Clade: Tracheophytes
- Clade: Angiosperms
- Clade: Eudicots
- Clade: Asterids
- Order: Asterales
- Family: Asteraceae
- Genus: Gnaphalium
- Species: G. uliginosum

Binomial name
- Gnaphalium uliginosum L. 1753 not A. Rich. 1848

Synonyms
- Synonymy: Dasyanthus uliginosus (L.) Bubani; Filaginella malzii Opiz; Filaginella pilularis (Wahlenb.) Tzvelev; Filaginella uliginosa (L.) Opiz; Filago pilularis Link; Gnaphalium aquaticum Mill.; Gnaphalium castaneum Gilib.; Gnaphalium humifusum Paill. ex Nyman; Gnaphalium laevissimum Schur; Gnaphalium nudum Hoffm. ex J.F.Gmel.; Gnaphalium prostratum Nyman; Gnaphalium ramosum Lam.; Gnaphalium sibiricum Kirp. & Kuprian. ex Kirp.; Gnaphalium tomentosum Hoffm.; Gnaphalium wirtgenii Nyman; Gnaphalodes evacinum Sond.

= Gnaphalium uliginosum =

Species of flowering plant

Gnaphalium uliginosum, the marsh cudweed, is an annual plant found on damp, disturbed ground and tracks. It is very widespread across much of Europe, Asia, and North America. It is very common on damp, arable grasslands, paths, and on acid soils.

== Description ==
It is a very woolly annual, growing 4–20 cm tall.

The leaves are wooly on both sides. They are 1 to 5 cm long, narrow oblong shaped.

The flower heads are 3 to 4 mm long. They are arranged in clusters of 3 to 10, surrounded by long leaves. The flower head bracts are wooly, and pale below, with dark chaffy hairless tips. The florets are brownish yellow. The stigmas are pale.

It flowers from July until September.
