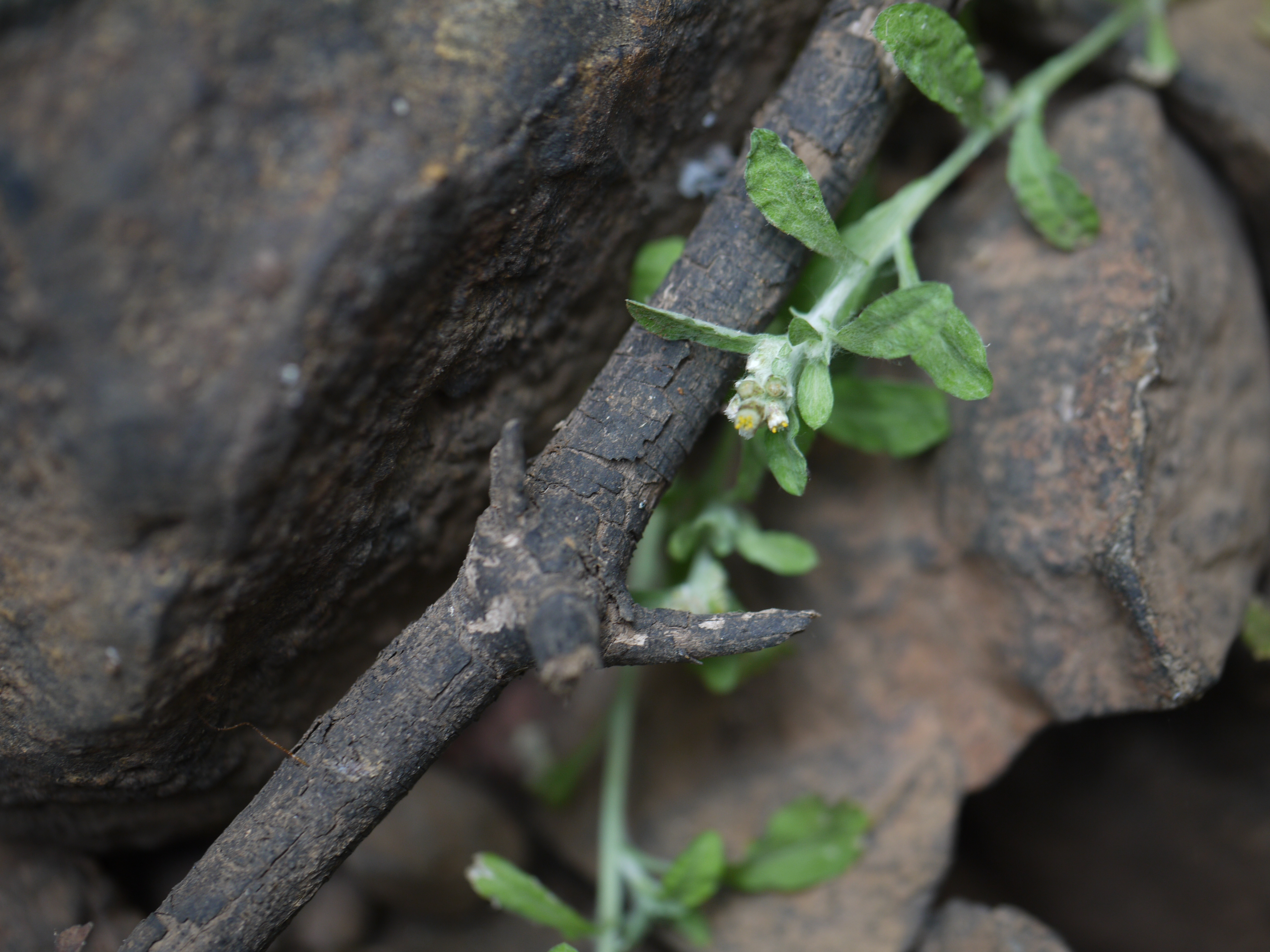

Conservation status
- Least Concern (IUCN 3.1)

Scientific classification
- Kingdom: Plantae
- Clade: Tracheophytes
- Clade: Angiosperms
- Clade: Eudicots
- Clade: Asterids
- Order: Asterales
- Family: Asteraceae
- Genus: Gnaphalium
- Species: G. polycaulon

Binomial name
- Gnaphalium polycaulon Pers. 1807

Synonyms
- Gnaphalium multicaule Willd. 1803, illegitimate homonym not Lam. 1788; Gnaphalium policaulon Pers.; Gnaphalium floccosum DC.; Gnaphalium gracillimum Perr. ex DC.; Gnaphalium niliacum Raddi ex Spreng.; Gnaphalium schomburgkii Sch.Bip.

= Gnaphalium polycaulon =

Species of flowering plant

Gnaphalium polycaulon, the many stem cudweed, is a plant species in the family Asteraceae. It is widespread across much of Mesoamerica, South America, and the West Indies, and naturalized in parts of Asia and Africa.

Gnaphalium polycaulon is a small annual herb up to 25 cm (9.8 in) tall, with several erect to ascending branches. Stems, leaves and phyllaries are covered with a dense coat of woolly hairs, giving the plant a whitish appearance. Leaves are narrowly linear, up to 4.5 cm (1.8 in) long. Flower heads are born in tight, elongated array. Each head contains numerous florets, mostly yellowish but sometimes with purple tips
