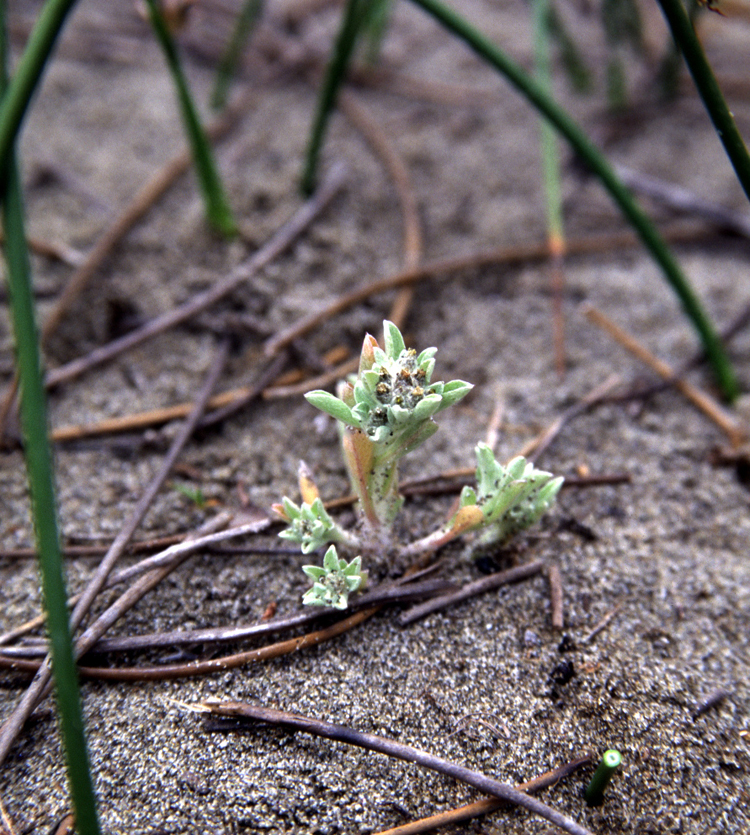

Conservation status
- Secure (NatureServe)

Scientific classification
- Kingdom: Plantae
- Clade: Tracheophytes
- Clade: Angiosperms
- Clade: Eudicots
- Clade: Asterids
- Order: Asterales
- Family: Asteraceae
- Genus: Gnaphalium
- Species: G. palustre

Binomial name
- Gnaphalium palustre Nutt. 1841

Synonyms
- Filaginella palustris (Nutt.) Holub

= Gnaphalium palustre =

Species of flowering plant

Gnaphalium palustre, known by the common name western marsh cudweed, is a species of flowering plant in the family Asteraceae.

The plant is native to much of western North America, where it is common in many habitats and from valley floor to mountain alpine elevations of Western Canada, the Western United States, and Northwestern Mexico. It is found from British Columbia, Alberta, and Saskatchewan south as far as Baja California Sur, Arizona, and New Mexico.

== Description ==
Gnaphalium palustre is an annual herb growing erect stems which may be short or up to about 30 centimeters (12 inches) tall. The stems and foliage are nearly white due to their coating of woolly hairs. The leaves are small and lance-shaped to scoop-shaped.

The inflorescence holds a cluster of flower heads in a nest of woolly fibers. Each head has brownish to pale yellowish phyllaries surrounding a center of many tiny flowers.
