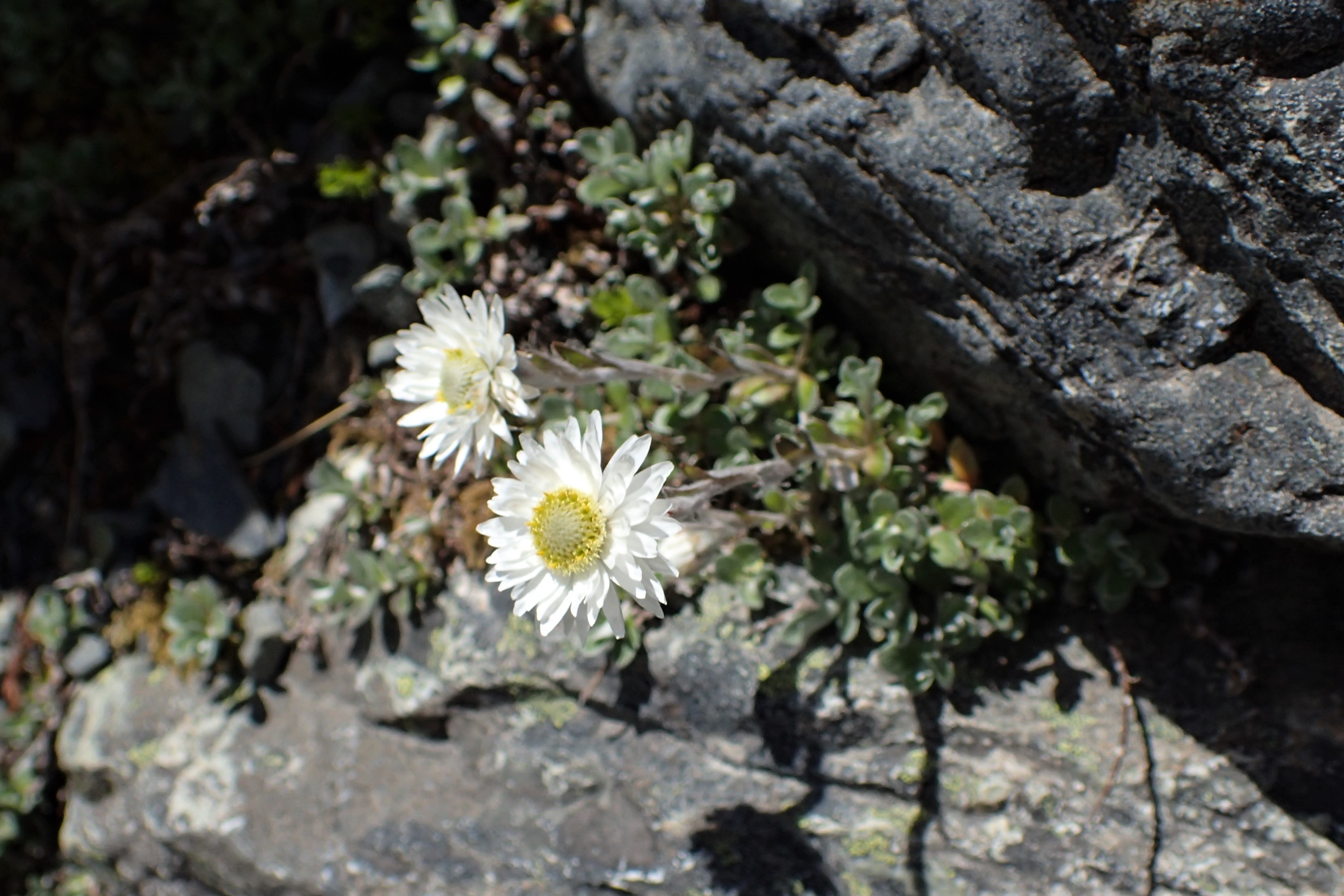

Conservation status
- Not Threatened (NZ TCS)

Scientific classification
- Kingdom: Plantae
- Clade: Tracheophytes
- Clade: Angiosperms
- Clade: Eudicots
- Clade: Asterids
- Order: Asterales
- Family: Asteraceae
- Genus: Anaphalioides
- Species: A. bellidioides

Binomial name
- Anaphalioides bellidioides (G. Forst.) Glenny

= Anaphalioides bellidioides =

Species of flowering plant

Anaphalioides bellidioides, commonly known as the New Zealand everlasting daisy, is a native vascular shrub in the genus Anaphalioides, found distributed throughout New Zealand.

== Description ==
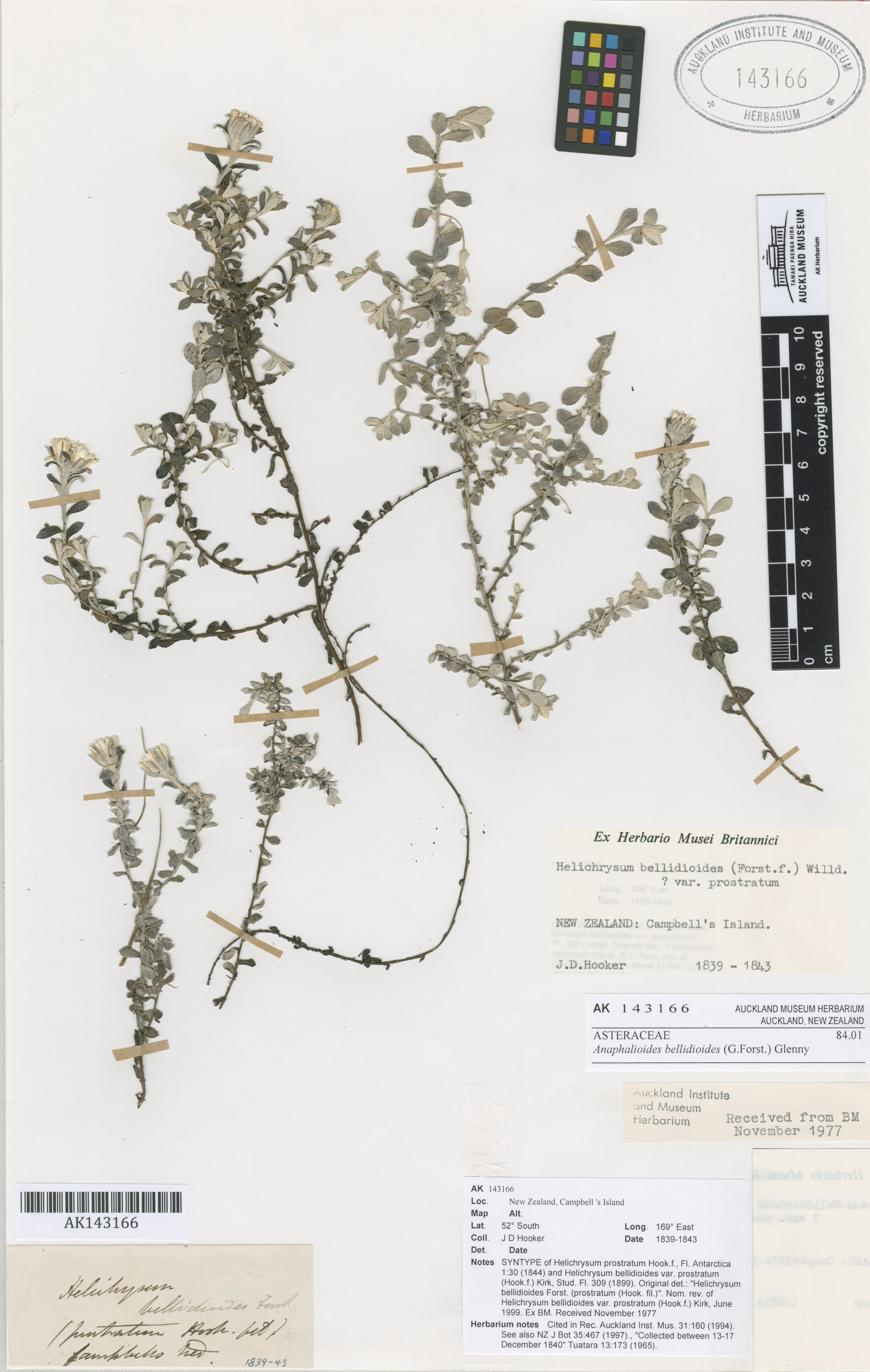
Syntype from the Auckland War Memorial Museum herbarium

Anaphalioides bellidioides comes from the term 'resembling Bellis', Bellis being a genus of daisy including Bellis perennis, the lawn daisy. The everlasting daisy is a small, low-growing shrub with trailing shoots that can grow up to 50 cm (20 in) long. It sits prostrate, with root attachment to soil substrate connected along the trailing shoot system. The leaves are closely spaced along the stems and are grey to green in colour. The topside of the leaves are glabrous, or free of hair when mature, with a soft white underside. The leaves are rounded and broad with a varying size of 5 mm–6 mm × 2 mm–4 mm (0.197 in–0.236 in × 0.079 in–0.157 in), before ending abruptly to a sharp point at the apex, with wedge-shaped semi amplexicaul, or semi-embracing of the stem, petioles. The everlasting daisy has scapes growing directly from a root, covered in bracts or scales. These scapes are red-brown and grow to approximately 37–105 mm (1.5–4.1 in) long. Each grows a singular inflorescence about 2–3 cm (0.79–1.18 in) in diameter when mature. The flower consists of 106–212 hermaphrodite florets that are approximately 4 mm (0.16 in) in diameter, encased in outer bracts. The center is yellow, while the outside petals are white and papery in texture. The branches, underside of leaves and flower stems all display tomentum. Tomentum is a botanical term for a fine woolly covering of closely matted hairs. However, Anaphalioides bellidioides is a variable plant with subtle differences depending on geographical location, and depending on habitat, the plant can vary slightly phenotypically in leaf size and hairiness.

== Distribution ==
Anaphalioides bellidioides is an endemic New Zealand species and is not found naturally in other countries. Within New Zealand, it is a common plant with a wide distribution. It is distributed throughout the middle to lower North Island in Gisborne, Taranaki and in the ranges surrounding Wellington such as Kaimanawa, Kaweka, Ruahine, Rimutaka and Wairarapa. In the South Island, it is widely distributed throughout the length of the island in Nelson, Marlborough, Westland, Canterbury, Otago and Southland. Additionally, it can be found on many of the smaller islands such as Stewart Island, the Chatham Islands, Auckland Islands, Campbell Island and the Antipodes Islands.

== Habitat ==
Anaphalioides bellidioides is commonly found in many environments from mountainous habitats to lower subalpine grasslands, where vegetation is quite open or at a low density. This includes in "scrub, tussock grasslands, riverbed and morainic gravels, roadsides, burned-over forests, rock outcrops and ultrabasic soils of the mineral belts".

As mentioned in the species description, phenotypical leaf features vary depending on the habitat in which Anaphalioides bellidioides is found. Leaf size and hairiness on the upper leaf surface are two key factors that vary. In the sub-antarctic Auckland and Campbell islands the only variety found are presented with leaves that are phenotypically hairier and larger. This is the same for mainland alpine and lower altitude streambeds, where it is thought that these plants in geographical locations are similar due to population spread from washing downstream. In the North Island and the lowland areas of the South Island, a smaller variety is found. This variety has a smaller leaf size that tends to be more glabrous on the upper leaf surface than its larger counterparts. In the tussock grassland and sub-alpine scrubs both phenotypical varieties co-exist. The differences in leaf size and hairiness within the species were concluded to not needing to be recognized taxonomically because the appearances are only phenotypic.

== Ecology ==
=== Life cycle and phenology ===
Anaphalioides bellidioides is an evergreen perennial, with flower heads that develop in late spring to early summer. Flowering takes place from October to December. Anaphalioides bellidioides, like most flowers in the Asteraceae family, has pappate cypselae which are dispersed via the wind (anemochory). Pappate cypselae are small, thin indehiscent seeds with a thin pericarp, which are crowned by a scaled or bristled calyx. In simpler terms, the seeds are fluffy and the flowerheads open, making wind pollination easier for the plant.

Additionally, Anaphalioides bellidioides also has the capacity to be pollinated via entomophily. Anaphalioides bellidioides capitulae were observed being visited by Dasyuris anceps, a moth, along with various species of Coleoptera, Syrphidae, and Tachinidae families. These insect visitors are pollinators, rather than predators, and provide pollen transfer between plants within the same species.

=== Diet and foraging ===
Anaphalioides bellidioides thrives in habitats that are low-density in vegetation, from mountainous regions to lowland grasslands. These environments vary, demonstrating that the species can adapt and live in multiple soil-types. For example, a preferred habitat of Anaphalioides bellidioides includes morainic gravels, rocky outcrops, scrub tussocks and ultrabasic soils. These all have high drainage and low nutrient availability in the soils. However, this species also thrives in places such as riverbeds and burned-out forests where the soil is generally quite different, with higher nutrient loads and water saturation levels.

Soil and environmental preferences for Anaphalioides bellidioides have not been thoroughly studied. However, this species is distributed from the middle of the North Island southwards. It can thus be reasoned that Anaphalioides bellidioides prefers lower temperature and humidity ranges, which coincide with the temperate/desert regions of New Zealand, as opposed to the sub-tropical regions of Waikato, Bay of Plenty and Northland.

=== Predators, parasites, and diseases ===
Anaphalioides bellidioides is known to be fed on by a variety of native insects, including larvae of two undescribed gall-forming Cecidomyiidae, leaf-feeding caterpillars of the moths Paranotoreas zopyra (Geometridae) and an undescribed species of Asterivora (Choreutidae), and flower-feeding larvae of an undescribed Trupanea species (Tephritidae).

== Scientific applications ==
A study investigated hybridization between Anaphalioides bellidioides and Helichrysum lanceolatum. Both species are everlastings from the Asteraceae family, and the populations for the study were sourced from Banks Peninsula. DNA sequencing and amplified fragment-length polymorphism fingerprinting was used to investigate the genetic sequences of the hybrids. The aim of the study was to investigate the rate at which hybrid seed is produced and the overall ongoing fertility of hybrids to the second generation. This is to better understand the hybridization of species radiations.

Phylogenetically, Helichrysum lanceolatum differs in appearance to Anaphalioides bellidioides. It is an upright, woody shrub with small, round leaves. Additionally, unlike Anaphalioides bellidioides, the capitula are smaller at approximately 2mm, branched into clusters and bearing no showy bracts. The hybrids produced from the two species are easily distinguished, which possibly is due to the difference in appearance between the parent species.

The study produced successful first generation (F1) hybrids with crosses from both species; however, hybrids with Helichrysum lanceolatum as the maternal parent were more common. The F1 hybrids seed production was less than that of the parent species, but the seeds produced were sequenced and showed back-crosses. Despite this, introgression, or allele transfer from one species into the gene pool of another from the back-crossed F1 hybrids were not viable and overall were too limited to be conclusive in the study.

A different study investigated a potential hybrid cross between Anaphalioides bellidioides and Ewartia sinclairii, beyond the F1 generation. Genetically, these two species are not closely related, and ecologically they tend to have different environmental tolerances. However, wild hybrids have been collected from these two species on rare occasions, so the aim was to see if the potential fitness of the hybrids extends past the F1 generation. This study raised three hybrids from collected wild seeds in the northeast of the South Island, deposited there by Anaphalioides bellidioides, Ewartia sinclairii and their intergeneric hybrids known to grow there. Conclusive evidence showed that there is partial fertility present between the wild cross, capable of providing viable backcrosses and multiple-generation hybrids.
