= Belloa wurdackiana =

Scientific classification
- Kingdom: Plantae
- Clade: Tracheophytes
- Clade: Angiosperms
- Clade: Eudicots
- Clade: Asterids
- Order: Asterales
- Family: Asteraceae
- Genus: Belloa
- Species: B. wurdackiana

Binomial name
- Belloa wurdackiana V.M.Badillo

Species of plant

Belloa wurdackiana is a species of plant in the family Asteraceae.
