= Belloa eriophora =

Scientific classification
- Kingdom: Plantae
- Clade: Tracheophytes
- Clade: Angiosperms
- Clade: Eudicots
- Clade: Asterids
- Order: Asterales
- Family: Asteraceae
- Genus: Belloa
- Species: B. eriophora

Binomial name
- Belloa eriophora (J.Rémy) M.O.Dillon

Species of plant

Belloa eriophora is a plant species native to Chile.
