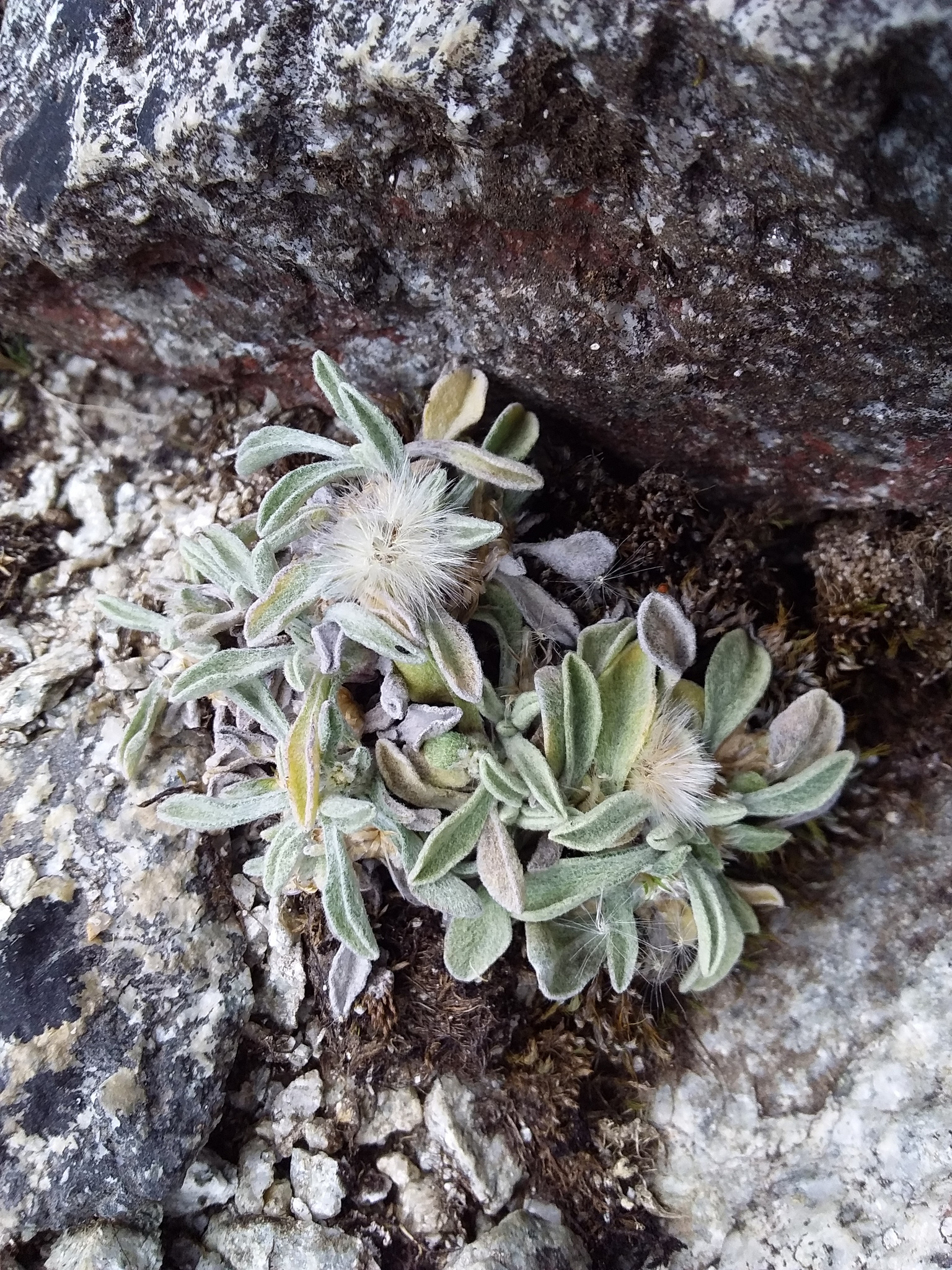

Scientific classification
- Kingdom: Plantae
- Clade: Tracheophytes
- Clade: Angiosperms
- Clade: Eudicots
- Clade: Asterids
- Order: Asterales
- Family: Asteraceae
- Genus: Mniodes
- Species: M. pickeringii

Binomial name
- Mniodes pickeringii (A.Gray) S.E.Freire, Chemisquy, Anderb. & Urtubey

Synonyms
- Belloa pickeringii (A.Gray) Sagást. & M.O.Dillon; Lucilia pickeringii A.Gray; Luciliocline pickeringii (A.Gray) M.O.Dillon & Sagást.

= Mniodes pickeringii =

Species of plant

Mniodes pickeringii is a species of plant in the family Asteraceae.
