= Anaxeton =

Scientific classification
- Kingdom: Plantae
- Clade: Embryophytes
- Clade: Tracheophytes
- Clade: Angiosperms
- Clade: Eudicots
- Clade: Asterids
- Order: Asterales
- Family: Asteraceae
- Subfamily: Asteroideae
- Tribe: Gnaphalieae
- Genus: Anaxeton; Gaertn.

Genus of flowering plants

Anaxeton is a genus of flowering plants in the family Asteraceae.

== Species ==
As of July 2020 there are ten accepted species in Anaxeton:
No.	Binomial name	Authority	Synonyms	Images
1.	Anaxeton angustifolium	Lundgren (1972)	nil	
2.	Anaxeton arborescens	(L.) Less. (1832)	*Anaxeton arboreum (L.) Gaertn. (1791); *Anaxeton floridum Poir. *Anaxeton floridum Lam. (1823); *Anaxeton recurvum (Lam.) DC. (1838); *Gnaphalium arborescens L. (1760); *Gnaphalium arboreum L. (1763); *Gnaphalium cylindricum L'Hér. ex DC. (1838); *Gnaphalium discolorum L. (1763); *Gnaphalium floridum Poir. (1812); *Gnaphalium recurvum Lam. (1788); *Gnaphalium rigidum Salisb. (1796)	
3.	Anaxeton asperum	Harv (Thunb.) DC. (1838)	nil	Anaxeton asperum
4.	Anaxeton brevipes	Lundgren (1972)	nil	Anaxeton brevipes
5.	Anaxeton ellipticum	Lundgren (1972)	nil	Anaxeton ellipticum
6.	Anaxeton hirsutum	Less. (1832)	Gnaphalium hirsutum Thunb. (1800)	Anaxeton hirusutum
7.	Anaxeton laeve	(Harv.) Lundgren (1972)	Anaxeton asperum var. laeve (1865) Harv.	Anaxeton laeve
8.	Anaxeton lundgrenii	B.Nord. (1998)	nil	
9.	Anaxeton nycthemerum	Less. (1832)	nil	
10.	Anaxeton virgatum	DC. (1838)	nil	

== Bibliography ==
1. Candolle, Augustin Pyramus de (1838). Prodromus systematis naturalis regni vegetabilis, sive, Enumeratio contracta ordinum generum specierumque plantarum huc usque cognitarium, juxta methodi naturalis, normas digesta (in Latin). Vol. 6. Parisii: Sumptibus Sociorum Treuttel et Würtz.
2. Lessing, Christian Friedrich (1832). Synopsis generum compositarum earumque dispositionis novae tentamen, monographis multarum Capensium interjectis. Berolini: sumtibus Dunckeri et Humblotii.
3. Lundgren (1972). Opera Botanica a Societate Botanica Lundensi. Lund, Copenhagen. Vol. 35.
4. Nordenstam, Rune Bertil (1988). "A new species of Anaxeton (Asteraceae) from the south-western Cape Province". South African Journal of Botany. 54 (6): 631–632. doi:10.1016/S0254-6299(16)31266-2. ISSN 0254-6299.
