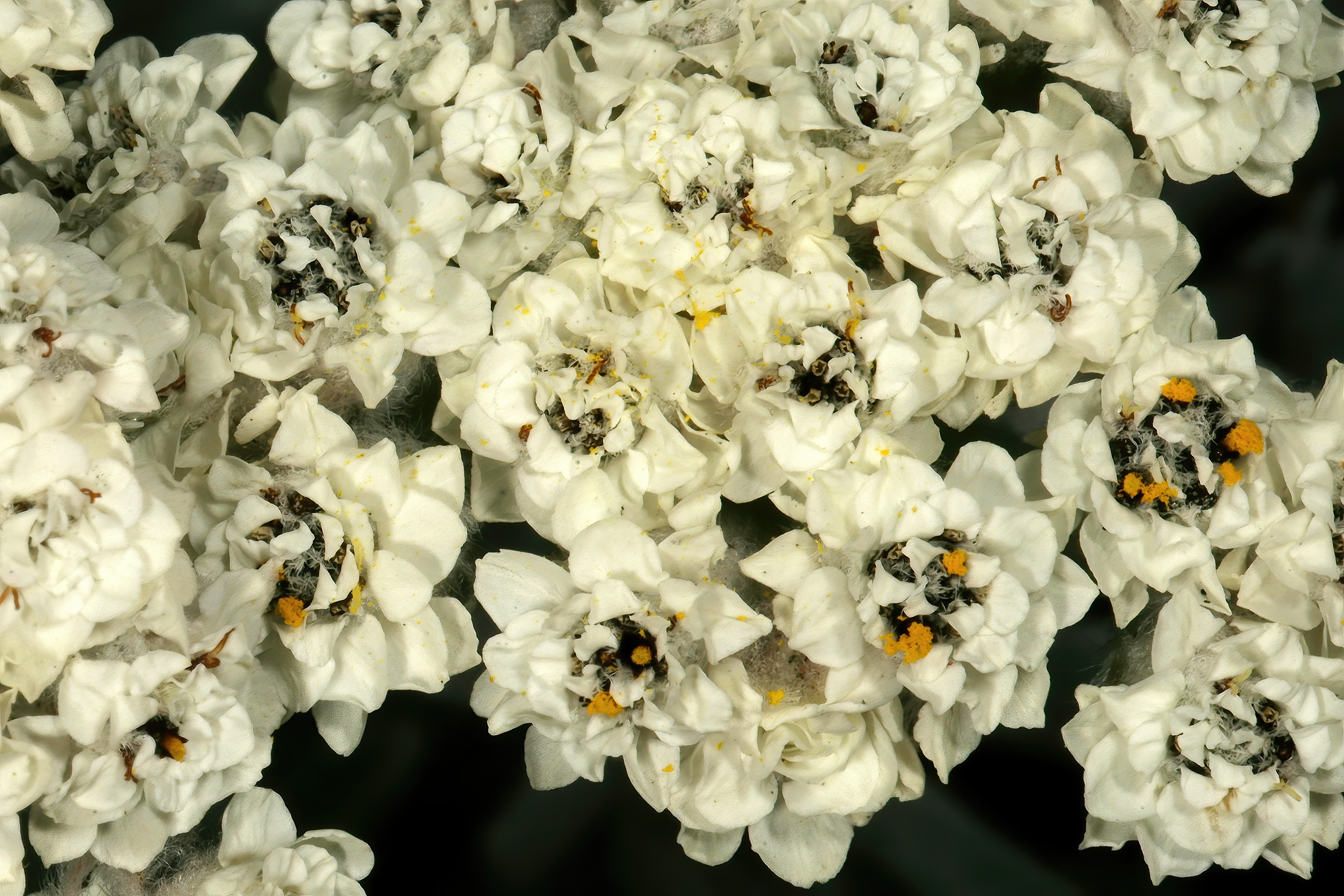
- Flowers of Petalacte coronata

Scientific classification
- Kingdom: Plantae
- Clade: Embryophytes
- Clade: Tracheophytes
- Clade: Angiosperms
- Clade: Eudicots
- Clade: Asterids
- Order: Asterales
- Family: Asteraceae
- Subfamily: Asteroideae
- Tribe: Gnaphalieae
- Genus: Petalacte; D.Don
- Species: P. coronata

Binomial name
- Petalacte coronata (L.) D.Don

Synonyms
- Billya Cass.; Gnaphalium achilleae Sieber ex DC.; Gnaphalium radiatum J.F.Gmel.; Gnaphalium coronatum L.

= Petalacte =

Genus of plants

Petalacte is a genus of flowering plants in the family Asteraceae.

Species

There is only one known species, Petalacte coronata, endemic to the Cape Provinces of South Africa.
