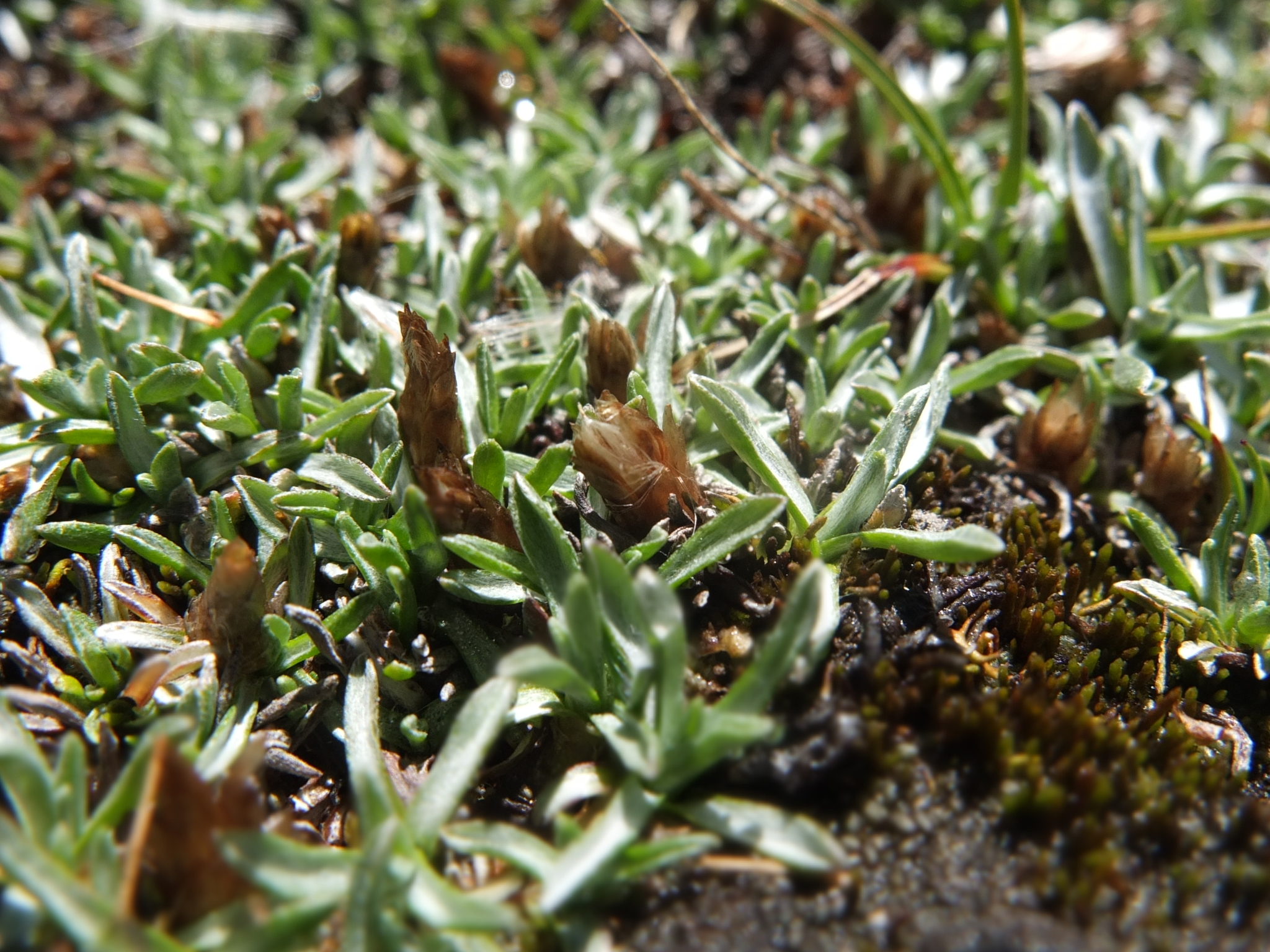

Scientific classification
- Kingdom: Plantae
- Clade: Tracheophytes
- Clade: Angiosperms
- Clade: Eudicots
- Clade: Asterids
- Order: Asterales
- Family: Asteraceae
- Genus: Lucilia
- Species: L. kunthiana

Binomial name
- Lucilia kunthiana (DC.) Zardini

Synonyms
- List: Belloa kunthiana (DC.) Anderb. & S.E.Freire; Belloa lehmannii (Hieron.) Anderb. & S.E.Freire; Conyza kunthiana DC.; Conyza pusilla Kunth; Gnaphalium depressum Nutt.; Gnaphalium kunthianum (DC.) Kuntze; Lucilia affinis Wedd.; Lucilia lehmannii Hieron.; Lucilia pusilla Hieron.; Lucilia venezuelensis Steyerm.; Lucilia violacea Wedd.; Merope kunthiana (DC.) Wedd.; Mniodes kunthiana (DC.) S.E.Freire, Chemisquy, Anderb. & Urtubey; Mniodes lehmannii (Hieron.) S.E.Freire, Chemisquy, Anderb. & Urtubey

= Lucilia kunthiana =

Species of plant

Lucilia kunthiana is a species of daisy in the family Asteraceae.
