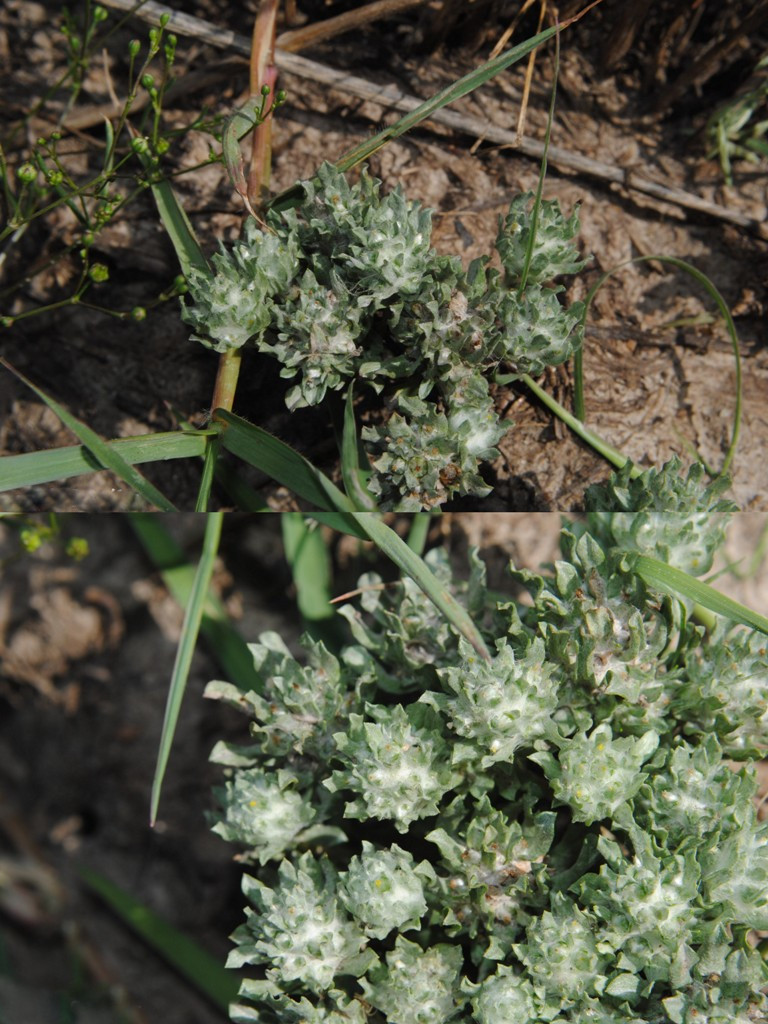
- Micropsis spathulata

Scientific classification
- Kingdom: Plantae
- Clade: Tracheophytes
- Clade: Angiosperms
- Clade: Eudicots
- Clade: Asterids
- Order: Asterales
- Family: Asteraceae
- Subfamily: Asteroideae
- Tribe: Gnaphalieae
- Genus: Micropsis; DC.

= Micropsis =

Genus of flowering plants

Micropsis is a genus of South American flowering plants in the family Asteraceae.

Species

- Micropsis australis Cabrera - Argentina
- Micropsis dasycarpa (Griseb.) Beauverd - Rio Grande do Sul, Argentina, Paraguay, Uruguay; naturalized in Victoria County in Texas
- Micropsis nana DC. - Chile including Juan Fernández Islands
- Micropsis ostenii Beauverd - Uruguay, northeastern Argentina (Buenos Aires + Entre Ríos)
- Micropsis spathulata (Pers.) Cabrera - Rio Grande do Sul, Argentina (Buenos Aires, Corrientes, Entre Ríos), Paraguay, Uruguay
