= Aliella =

Scientific classification
- Kingdom: Plantae
- Clade: Tracheophytes
- Clade: Angiosperms
- Clade: Eudicots
- Clade: Asterids
- Order: Asterales
- Family: Asteraceae
- Subfamily: Asteroideae
- Tribe: Gnaphalieae
- Genus: Aliella; Qaiser & Lack

Type species
- Aliella platyphylla (Maire) Qaiser & Lack

Genus of flowering plants

Aliella is a genus of flowering plants in the family Asteraceae. described as a genus in 1986.

The entire genus is endemic to Morocco.

== Species ==
As of May 2024, Plants of the World Online accepted the following species:

- Aliella ballii (Klatt) Greuter - Morocco
- Aliella iminouakensis (Emb.) Dobignard & Jeanm. - Morocco
- Aliella latifolia (Maire) Dobignard
- Aliella platyphylla (Maire) Qaiser & Lack - Morocco
