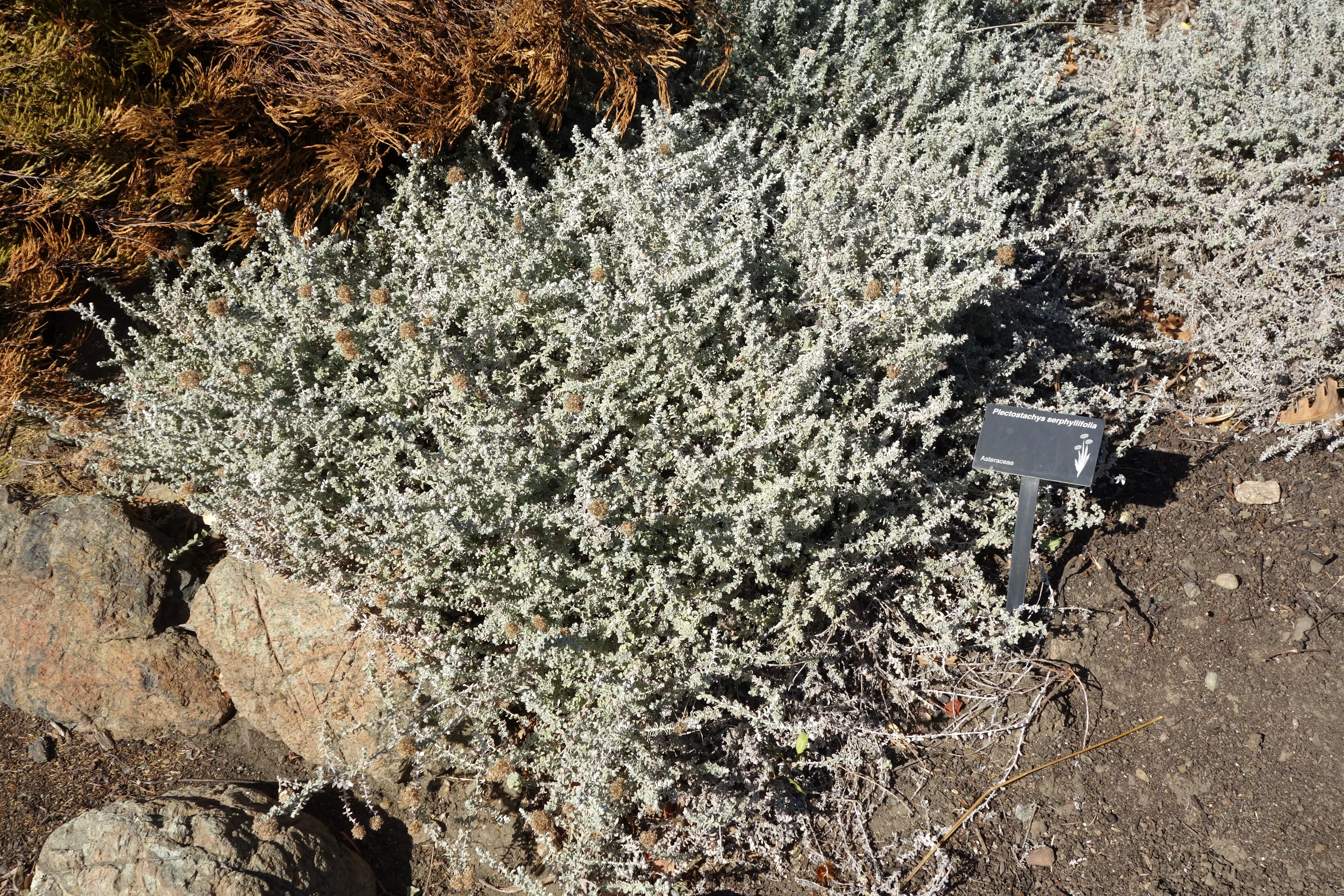
- Plecostachys serpyllifolia

Scientific classification
- Kingdom: Plantae
- Clade: Tracheophytes
- Clade: Angiosperms
- Clade: Eudicots
- Clade: Asterids
- Order: Asterales
- Family: Asteraceae
- Subfamily: Asteroideae
- Tribe: Gnaphalieae
- Genus: Plecostachys; Hilliard & B.L.Burtt, Bot. J. Linn. Soc. 82: 206, 1981

= Plecostachys =

Genus of flowering plants

Plecostachys is a genus of South African flowering plants in the family Asteraceae. They are native to the Cape Provinces, KwaZulu-Natal, and Eswatini.

Species

- Plecostachys polifolia (Thunb.) Hilliard & B.L.Burtt
- Plecostachys serpyllifolia (P.J.Bergius) Hilliard & B.L.Burtt
