= Dolichothrix =

Scientific classification
- Kingdom: Plantae
- Clade: Tracheophytes
- Clade: Angiosperms
- Clade: Eudicots
- Clade: Asterids
- Order: Asterales
- Family: Asteraceae
- Subfamily: Asteroideae
- Tribe: Gnaphalieae
- Genus: Dolichothrix; Hilliard & B.L.Burtt
- Species: D. ericoides

Binomial name
- Dolichothrix ericoides (Lam.) Hilliard & B.L.Burtt

Synonyms
- Aphelexis ericoides Sweet; Argyrocome ericoides Poir.; Bryomorphe lycopodioides (Sch.Bip. ex Sch.Bip.) Levyns; Bryomorphe zeyheri Harv.; Gnaphalium argyrocoma Sch.Bip.; Helichrysum ericoides (Lam.) Pers.; Klenzea lycopodioides Sch.Bip. ex Walp.; Stoebe nivea Thunb.; Xeranthemum ericoides Lam. (basionym); Xeranthemum moniliforme Houtt. ex DC.

Genus of flowering plants

Dolichothrix is a genus of flowering plants in the family of Asteraceae.

There is only one known species, Dolichothrix ericoides, which is endemic to the Cape Provinces of South Africa.
