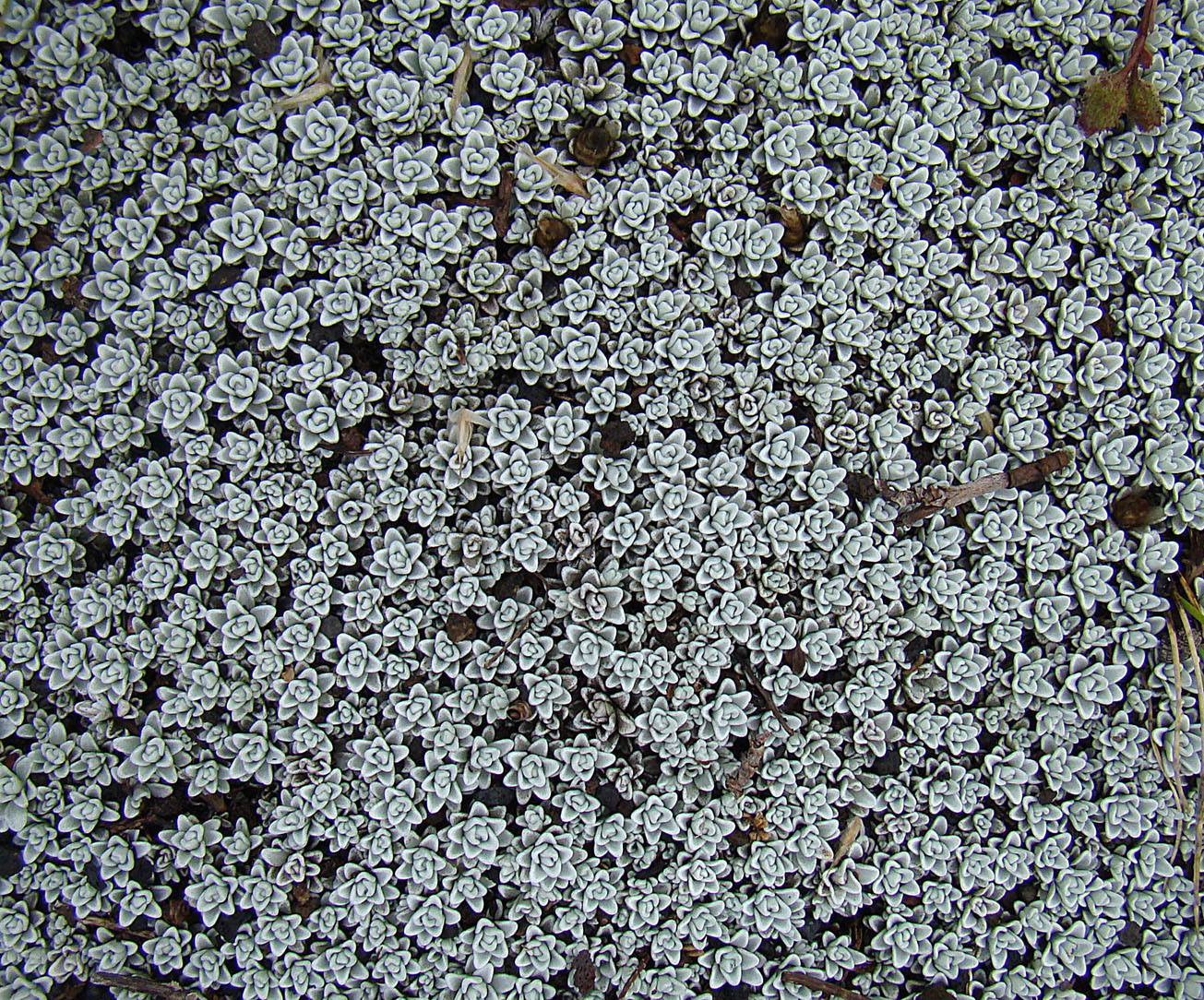
- Belloa chilensis

Scientific classification
- Kingdom: Plantae
- Clade: Embryophytes
- Clade: Tracheophytes
- Clade: Angiosperms
- Clade: Eudicots
- Clade: Asterids
- Order: Asterales
- Family: Asteraceae
- Subfamily: Asteroideae
- Tribe: Gnaphalieae
- Genus: Belloa; Remy

Type species
- Belloa chilensis (Hook. & Arn.) Remy

Synonyms
- Lucilia sect. Lucilloides DC.; Merope Wedd. 1856, illegitimate homonym not M. Roem. 1856 (Rutaceae)

= Belloa =

Genus of flowering plants

Belloa is a genus of South American flowering plants in the sunflower family.

== Species ==
The following species are recognised in the genus Belloa:

- Belloa chilensis J.Rémy
- Belloa eriophora (J.Rémy) M.O.Dillon
- Belloa erythractis (Wedd.) Cabrera
- Belloa nivea (Phil.) M.O.Dillon
- Belloa wurdackiana V.M.Badillo
