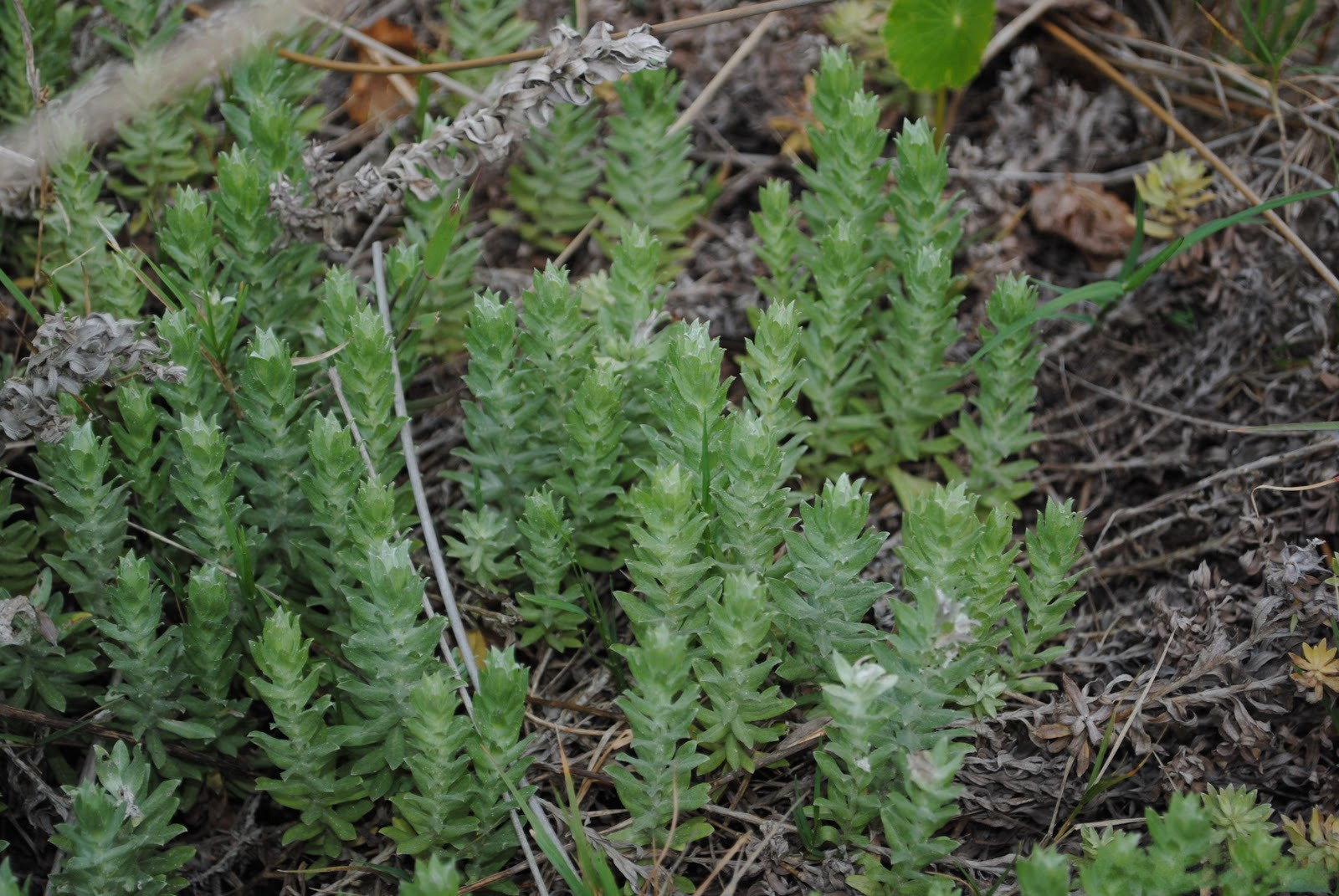
- Lucilia nitens

Scientific classification
- Kingdom: Plantae
- Clade: Embryophytes
- Clade: Tracheophytes
- Clade: Spermatophytes
- Clade: Angiosperms
- Clade: Eudicots
- Clade: Asterids
- Order: Asterales
- Family: Asteraceae
- Subfamily: Asteroideae
- Tribe: Gnaphalieae
- Genus: Lucilia; Cass.

Type species
- Lucilia acutifolia (Poir.) Cass.

Synonyms
- Oligandra Less.; Celaena Wedd.; Pachyrhynchus DC.; Lucilia sect. Intermedieae S.E.Freire; Hymenopholi Gardner

= Lucilia (plant) =

Genus of flowering plants

Lucilia is a genus of South American flowering plants in the tribe Gnaphalieae within the family Asteraceae.

== Species ==
The following species are recognised:

- Lucilia acutifolia Cass.
- Lucilia conoidea Wedd.
- Lucilia ferruginea Baker
- Lucilia kunthiana (DC.) Zardini
- Lucilia linearifolia Baker
- Lucilia lycopodioides (Less.) S.E.Freire
- Lucilia nitens Less.
- Lucilia recurva Wedd.
- Lucilia saxatilis V.M.Badillo
- Lucilia tomentosa Wedd.
