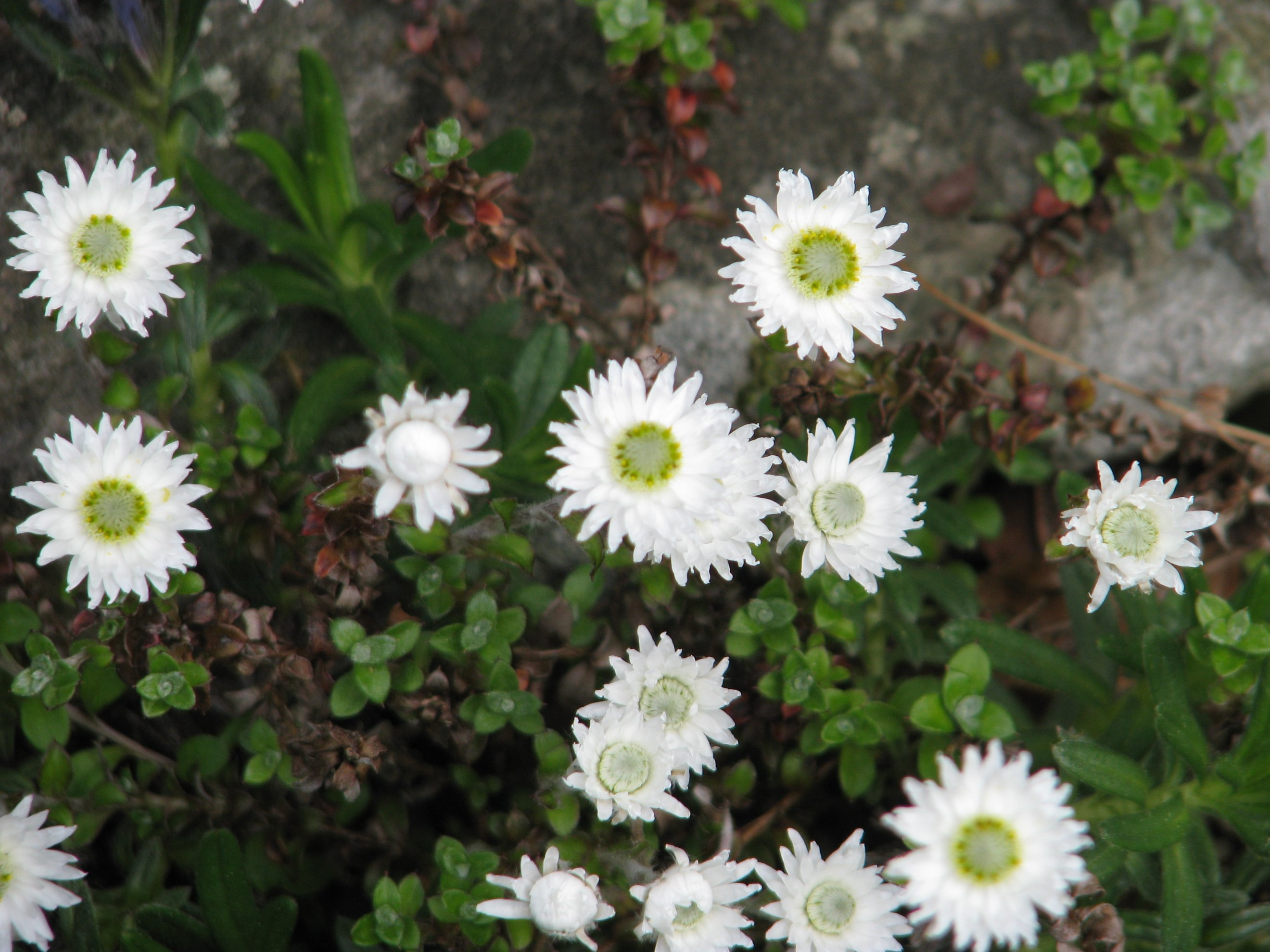
- Anaphalioides bellidioides

Scientific classification
- Kingdom: Plantae
- Clade: Embryophytes
- Clade: Tracheophytes
- Clade: Angiosperms
- Clade: Eudicots
- Clade: Asterids
- Order: Asterales
- Family: Asteraceae
- Tribe: Gnaphalieae
- Genus: Anaphalioides (Bentham) Kirpichnikov

Type species
- Anaphalioides keriensis (A. Cunningham) Kirpichnikov

Synonyms
- Gnaphalium sect. Anaphalioides Benth. & Hook.f.

= Anaphalioides =

Genus of flowering plants

Anaphalioides is a flowering plant genus in the Asteraceae family, described as a genus in 1950. They are native to New Zealand and New Guinea.

Species

- Anaphalioides alpina (Cockayne) D.Glenny - New Zealand
- Anaphalioides bellidioides (G.Forst.) D.Glenny - New Zealand incl. Antipodean + Chatham Islands
- Anaphalioides hookeri (Allan) Anderb. - New Zealand South Island
- Anaphalioides mariae (F.Muell.) Glenny - New Zealand, Papua New Guinea
- Anaphalioides papuana (F.Muell.) Glenny - New Zealand, Papua New Guinea
- Anaphalioides subrigida (Colenso) Anderb - New Zealand North Island
- Anaphalioides trinervis (G.Forst.) Anderb. - New Zealand
