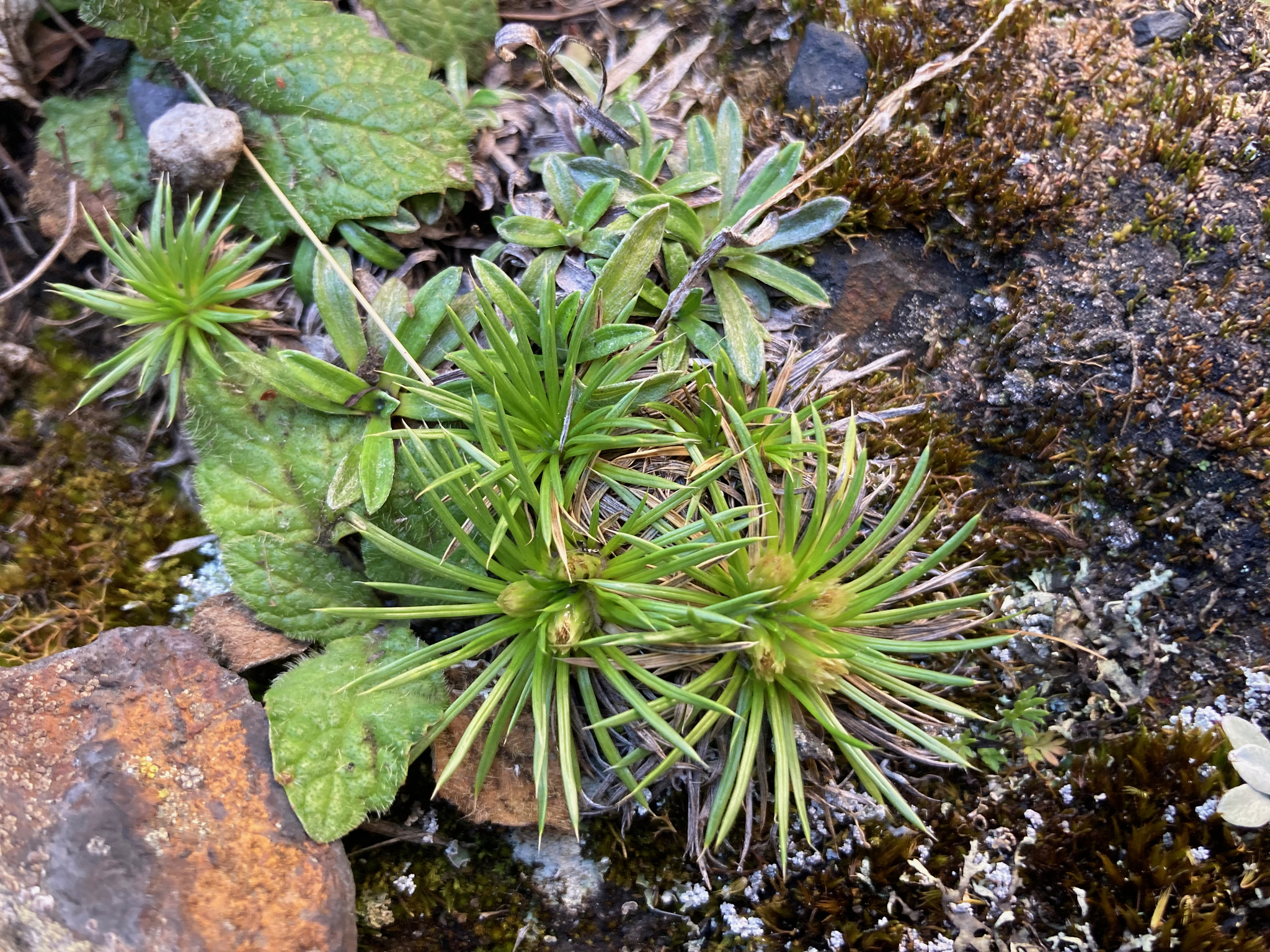
- Novenia tunariensis in Peru

Scientific classification
- Kingdom: Plantae
- Clade: Embryophytes
- Clade: Tracheophytes
- Clade: Angiosperms
- Clade: Eudicots
- Clade: Asterids
- Order: Asterales
- Family: Asteraceae
- Subfamily: Asteroideae
- Tribe: Astereae
- Subtribe: Oritrophiinae
- Genus: Novenia; S.E.Freire
- Species: N. tunariensis

Binomial name
- Novenia tunariensis (Kuntze) S.E.Freire

Synonyms
- Novenia acaulis (Kuntze) S.E.Freire; Gnaphalium tunariense Kuntze; Lucilia tunariensis Kuntze; Dolichogyne acaulis Wedd. ex Benth. & Hook.f.; Mniodes tunariensis (Kuntze) Hieron. ex Weberb.; Dolichogyne lepidophylla Wedd.; Lepidophyllum acaule (Wedd. ex Benth.) S.E.Freire & F.Hellwig

= Novenia =

Genus of flowering plants

Novenia is a genus of flowering plants in the tribe Astereae within the family Asteraceae. It is monotypic, being represented by the single species Novenia tunariensis, which is native to Argentina (Salta) and Peru (Lima, Ancash, Puno, Cajamarca, Pasco, Cuzco. La Libertad, Huánuco, Junín).
