= Neojeffreya =

Scientific classification
- Kingdom: Plantae
- Clade: Tracheophytes
- Clade: Angiosperms
- Clade: Eudicots
- Clade: Asterids
- Order: Asterales
- Family: Asteraceae
- Subfamily: Asteroideae
- Tribe: Inuleae
- Genus: Neojeffreya; Cabrera
- Species: N. decurrens

Binomial name
- Neojeffreya decurrens (L.) Cabrera

Synonyms
- Jeffreya Cabrera 1978, illegitimate homonym, not Wild 1974; Conyza decurrens L.; Gnaphalium decurrens L.; Pterocaulon bojeri Baker; Jeffreya decurrens (L.) Cabrera; Baccharis pterocaulon Bojer ex DC.; Monenteles pterocaulon DC.; Pterocaulon decurrens (L.) S.Moore

Genus of flowering plants

Neojeffreya is a genus of Malagasy flowering plants in the family Asteraceae.

Species

There is only one known species, Neojeffreya decurrens, native to Madagascar.
