= Gnomophalium =

Scientific classification
- Kingdom: Plantae
- Clade: Tracheophytes
- Clade: Angiosperms
- Clade: Eudicots
- Clade: Asterids
- Order: Asterales
- Family: Asteraceae
- Subfamily: Asteroideae
- Tribe: Gnaphalieae
- Genus: Gnomophalium; Greuter
- Species: G. pulvinatum

Binomial name
- Gnomophalium pulvinatum (Delile) Greuter

Synonyms
- Gnaphalium pulvinatum Delile; Filago prostrata DC.; Gnaphalium pulverulentum Bové ex DC.; Homognaphalium pulvinatum (Delile) Fayed & Zareh; Gnaphalium depressum Roxb.; Gnaphalium crispatulum C.B.Clarke

Species of plant

Gnomophalium is a genus of flowering plants in the family Asteraceae.

Species

There is only one known species, Gnomophalium pulvinatum, native to Egypt, Sudan, Iran, the Indian subcontinent, Afghanistan, and Tibet.
