= List of Sisyrinchium species =

There are 212 species are currently accepted within the genus Sisyrinchium. Botanists have divided the genus using several schemes in the past, but the current division into 10 sections proposed by Inacio et al in 2017 is rooted in phylogenetic analysis and mapped to consistent morphological characters.

Species

The following species are accepted in the genus Sisyrinchium:

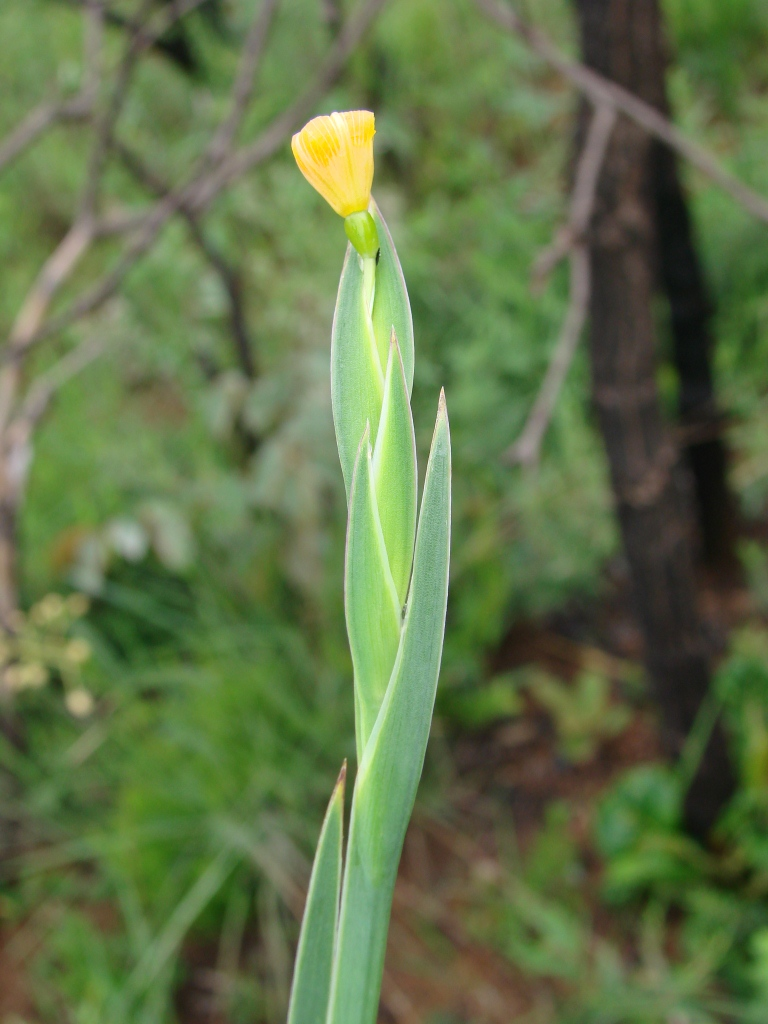
Sisyrinchium vaginatum

- Sisyrinchium abietum McVaugh
- Sisyrinchium acre H.Mann
- Sisyrinchium albidum Raf. – white blue-eyed grass
- Sisyrinchium albilapidense Ravenna
- Sisyrinchium anadenicum Ravenna
- Sisyrinchium anarosae Zamudio & Ceja
- Sisyrinchium andinopatagonicum Ravenna
- Sisyrinchium angustifolium Mill – narrow-leaf blue-eyed-grass
- Sisyrinchium angustissimum (B.L.Rob. & Greenman) Greenman & C.Thompson
- Sisyrinchium annuum Ravenna
- Sisyrinchium antucense Ravenna
- Sisyrinchium aquidaunicum Ravenna
- Sisyrinchium arenarium Poeppig – yellow-eyed grass
- Sisyrinchium arguellesiae Ceja, Espejo & López-Ferr.
- Sisyrinchium arizonicum Rothrock – Arizona blue-eyed grass
- Sisyrinchium arrayanicum Ravenna
- Sisyrinchium atlanticum Bickn. – eastern blue-eyed grass
- Sisyrinchium avenaceum Klatt
- Sisyrinchium azureum Philippi
- Sisyrinchium balansae Baker
- Sisyrinchium bellum S.Watson – western blue-eyed grass
- Sisyrinchium bermudiana – blue-eyed grass
- Sisyrinchium biflorum Griseb.
- Sisyrinchium biforme Bickn. – wiry blue-eyed grass
- Sisyrinchium binervatum Ravenna
- Sisyrinchium brasiliense (Ravenna) Ravenna
- Sisyrinchium breviarmium Ravenna
- Sisyrinchium brevipes Baker
- Sisyrinchium bromelioides R.C.Foster
- Sisyrinchium caespitificum Kraenzl.
- Sisyrinchium caeteanum Ravenna
- Sisyrinchium calathinum Ravenna
- Sisyrinchium calciphilum Sorrie
- Sisyrinchium californicum (Ker-Gawl.) Dryand. – golden blue-eyed grass, yellow-eyed-grass
- Sisyrinchium campestre Bickn. – prairie blue-eyed grass
- Sisyrinchium capillare Bickn.
- Sisyrinchium caratuvense C.D.Inácio & E.D.Lozano
- Sisyrinchium cernuum (Bickn.) Kearney – nodding blue-eyed grass
- Sisyrinchium chaguaranicum Ravenna
- Sisyrinchium chapelcoense Ravenna
- Sisyrinchium chilense Hook – swordleaf blue-eyed grass
- Sisyrinchium chiricanum Woodson
- Sisyrinchium cholewae Espejo, López-Ferr. & Ceja
- Sisyrinchium claritae Herter
- Sisyrinchium coalitum Ravenna
- Sisyrinchium commutatum Klatt
- Sisyrinchium convallium Ravenna
- Sisyrinchium convolutum Nocca
- Sisyrinchium conzattii Calderón & Rzed.
- Sisyrinchium coulterianum Klatt ex Baker
- Sisyrinchium cuspidatum Poeppig
- Sisyrinchium cylindrocarpium Herter
- Sisyrinchium cyperellum Ravenna
- Sisyrinchium dasyspathum (Ravenna) Ravenna
- Sisyrinchium decumbens Ravenna
- Sisyrinchium deflexum R.C.Foster
- Sisyrinchium demissum Greene – stiff blue-eyed grass
- Sisyrinchium densiflorum Ravenna
- Sisyrinchium deseadense Ravenna
- Sisyrinchium dichotomum Bickn. – wishbone blue-eyed grass
- Sisyrinchium dimorphum R.L.Oliv.
- Sisyrinchium diversicarpum C.D.Inácio & L.Eggers
- Sisyrinchium elegantulum Ravenna
- Sisyrinchium elizabethiae E.L.Keith
- Sisyrinchium elmeri Greene
- Sisyrinchium ensigerum E.P.Bicknell
- Sisyrinchium eserrulatum I.M.Johnst.
- Sisyrinchium exalatum B.L.Rob. & Greenman
- Sisyrinchium exilifolium Ravenna
- Sisyrinchium fasciculatum Klatt
- Sisyrinchium fiebrigii I.M.Johnst.
- Sisyrinchium firmifolium Ravenna
- Sisyrinchium funereum Bickn. – Funeral Mountain blue-eyed grass
- Sisyrinchium fuscatum Bickn. – coastal plain blue-eyed grass
- Sisyrinchium galapagense Ravenna
- Sisyrinchium glaziovii Baker
- Sisyrinchium graminifolium Lindley
- Sisyrinchium gratissimum Ravenna
- Sisyrinchium groenlandicum Böcher
- Sisyrinchium guanajuatense Ceja, Espejo & López-Ferr
- Sisyrinchium halophilum Greene – Nevada blue-eyed grass
- Sisyrinchium hasslerianum Baker
- Sisyrinchium hintoniorum G.L.Nesom
- Sisyrinchium hirsutum Baker
- Sisyrinchium hitchcockii D.Henderson – Hitchcock's blue-eyed grass
- Sisyrinchium hoehnei I.M.Johnst.
- Sisyrinchium humahuacense C.A.Zanotti
- Sisyrinchium hypsophilum I.M.Johnst. ex R.C.Foster
- Sisyrinchium idahoense Bickn. – Idaho blue-eyed grass
- Sisyrinchium igatimiense Ravenna
- Sisyrinchium iguazuanum C.D.Inácio, L.Eggers & Chauveau
- Sisyrinchium inclinatum Ravenna
- Sisyrinchium intihuatanense (Vargas) Ravenna
- Sisyrinchium itabiritense Ravenna
- Sisyrinchium ivanii R.C.Foster
- Sisyrinchium jacquelineanum Art.Castro, H.Ávila & J.G.González
- Sisyrinchium jamesonii Baker
- Sisyrinchium johnstonii Standl.
- Sisyrinchium laetum (Ravenna) J.M.Watson & A.R.Flores
- Sisyrinchium laevigatum Ravenna
- Sisyrinchium langloisii Greene
- Sisyrinchium laterale Baker
- Sisyrinchium latiusculum Ravenna
- Sisyrinchium laxum Otto – veined yellow-eyed-grass
- Sisyrinchium limarinum Ravenna
- Sisyrinchium littorale Greene – Alaska blue-eyed grass
- Sisyrinchium longipes (Bickn.) Kearney & Peebles – timberland blue-eyed grass
- Sisyrinchium longispathum Conz.
- Sisyrinchium luzula Klotzsch ex Klatt
- Sisyrinchium macranthum Griseb.
- Sisyrinchium macrocarpum Hieron.
- Sisyrinchium macrophyllum Greenman
- Sisyrinchium magnicapsulare J.M.Watson
- Sisyrinchium maipoanum Ravenna
- Sisyrinchium mandonii Baker
- Sisyrinchium marchioides Ravenna
- Sisyrinchium martense Ravenna
- Sisyrinchium megapotamicum Malme
- Sisyrinchium miamiense Bickn. – Miami blue-eyed grass
- Sisyrinchium micranthum Cav. – annual blue-eyed grass, blue pigroot, fairy stars, and striped rush-leaf
- Sisyrinchium microbracteatum G.L.Nesom
- Sisyrinchium minus Engelm. & A.Gray – dwarf blue-eyed grass
- Sisyrinchium minutiflorum Klatt
- Sisyrinchium montanum Greene – strict blue-eyed grass, American blue-eyed grass
- Sisyrinchium mucronatum Michx. – needletip blue-eyed grass
- Sisyrinchium myrioflorum E.L.Keith
- Sisyrinchium nanum Phil.
- Sisyrinchium nashii Bickn. – Nash's blue-eyed grass
- Sisyrinchium nembyense Ravenna
- Sisyrinchium nidulare (Hand.-Mazz.) I.M.Johnst.
- Sisyrinchium nigricans Gay
- Sisyrinchium novoleonense G.L.Nesom & L.Hern.
- Sisyrinchium obconicum Ravenna
- Sisyrinchium orbiculatum Ravenna
- Sisyrinchium ostenianum Beauverd
- Sisyrinchium oxyspathum Ravenna
- Sisyrinchium pachyrhizum Baker
- Sisyrinchium pallidum Cholewa & D.Henderson – pale blue-eyed grass
- Sisyrinchium palmifolium L.
- Sisyrinchium palustre Diels
- Sisyrinchium papillosum R.C.Foster
- Sisyrinchium paramorum Ravenna
- Sisyrinchium parvifolium Baker
- Sisyrinchium patagonicum Phil. ex Baker
- Sisyrinchium paucispathum Ravenna
- Sisyrinchium pearcei Phil.
- Sisyrinchium pendulum Ravenna
- Sisyrinchium planicola Ceja & Cholewa
- Sisyrinchium platense I.M.Johnst
- Sisyrinchium platycaule Baker
- Sisyrinchium platyphyllum S. Wats.
- Sisyrinchium plicatulum Ravenna
- Sisyrinchium praealtum Kranzl.
- Sisyrinchium pringlei B.L.Rob. & Greenman
- Sisyrinchium pruinosum – spotted blue-eyed grass
- Sisyrinchium purpurellum Ravenna
- Sisyrinchium pusillum Kunth
- Sisyrinchium quadrangulatum Klatt
- Sisyrinchium radicatum Bickn. – bigroot blue-eyed grass
- Sisyrinchium rambonis R.C.Foster
- Sisyrinchium rectilineum Ravenna
- Sisyrinchium rectivalvatum Ravenna
- Sisyrinchium reitzii R.C.Foster
- Sisyrinchium restioides Spreng.
- Sisyrinchium rigidifolium Baker
- Sisyrinchium rosengurttii I.M.Johnst.
- Sisyrinchium sagittiferum Bickn. – spearbract blue-eyed grass
- Sisyrinchium sarmentosum Suksdorf ex Greene – mountain blue-eyed grass
- Sisyrinchium scabrum Schltdl. & Cham.
- Sisyrinchium scalarium Ravenna
- Sisyrinchium scariosum I.M.Johnst
- Sisyrinchium schaffneri S.Wats.
- Sisyrinchium schottii Herter
- Sisyrinchium sellowianum Klatt
- Sisyrinchium septentrionale Bickn. – northern blue-eyed grass
- Sisyrinchium serrulatum (E.P.Bicknell) Espejo & López-Ferr.
- Sisyrinchium setaceum Klatt
- Sisyrinchium sinuosum Ravenna
- Sisyrinchium soboliferum Ravenna
- Sisyrinchium somuncurense Ravenna
- Sisyrinchium striatum Sm. – pale yellow-eyed-grass or satin flower
- Sisyrinchium strictum E.P.Bicknell
- Sisyrinchium subalpinum Henrich & Goldblatt
- Sisyrinchium subcernuum (E.Bickn.) Henrich & Goldblatt
- Sisyrinchium subnudum I.M.Johnst.
- Sisyrinchium subtileRavenna
- Sisyrinchium tafiense Ravenna
- Sisyrinchium teleanthum Ravenna
- Sisyrinchium tenuifolium Humb. & Bonpl. ex Willd.
- Sisyrinchium tinctorium Kunth
- Sisyrinchium tofoense Ravenna
- Sisyrinchium tolucense Peyr.
- Sisyrinchium translucens (E.P.Bicknell) Espejo & López-Ferr.
- Sisyrinchium trichanthum Dusén
- Sisyrinchium trichospathum (Ravenna) C.D.Inácio & L.Eggers
- Sisyrinchium trinerve Baker
- Sisyrinchium tucumanum Ravenna
- Sisyrinchium uliginosum Ravenna
- Sisyrinchium unguiculatum Griseb.
- Sisyrinchium unispathaceum Klatt
- Sisyrinchium usneoides C.D.Inácio & Antunes
- Sisyrinchium vaginatum Spreng.
- Sisyrinchium valparadiseum Ravenna
- Sisyrinchium venezolense Ravenna
- Sisyrinchium vestitum Ravenna
- Sisyrinchium weirii Baker
- Sisyrinchium wettsteinii Handel-Mazzetti
- Sisyrinchium xerophyllum Greene – jeweled blue-eyed grass
- Sisyrinchium zamudioi Espejo, López-Ferr. & Ceja

== Formerly placed here ==
- Calydorea speciosa (Hook.) Herb. (as S. speciosum Hook.)
- Eleutherine bulbosa (Mill.) Urb. (as S. bulbosum Mill.)
- Libertia ixioides (G.Forst.) Spreng. (as S. ixioides G.Forst.)
- Solenomelus pedunculatus (Gillies) Hochr. (as S. pedunculatum Gillies ex Hook.)
- Olsynium junceum
