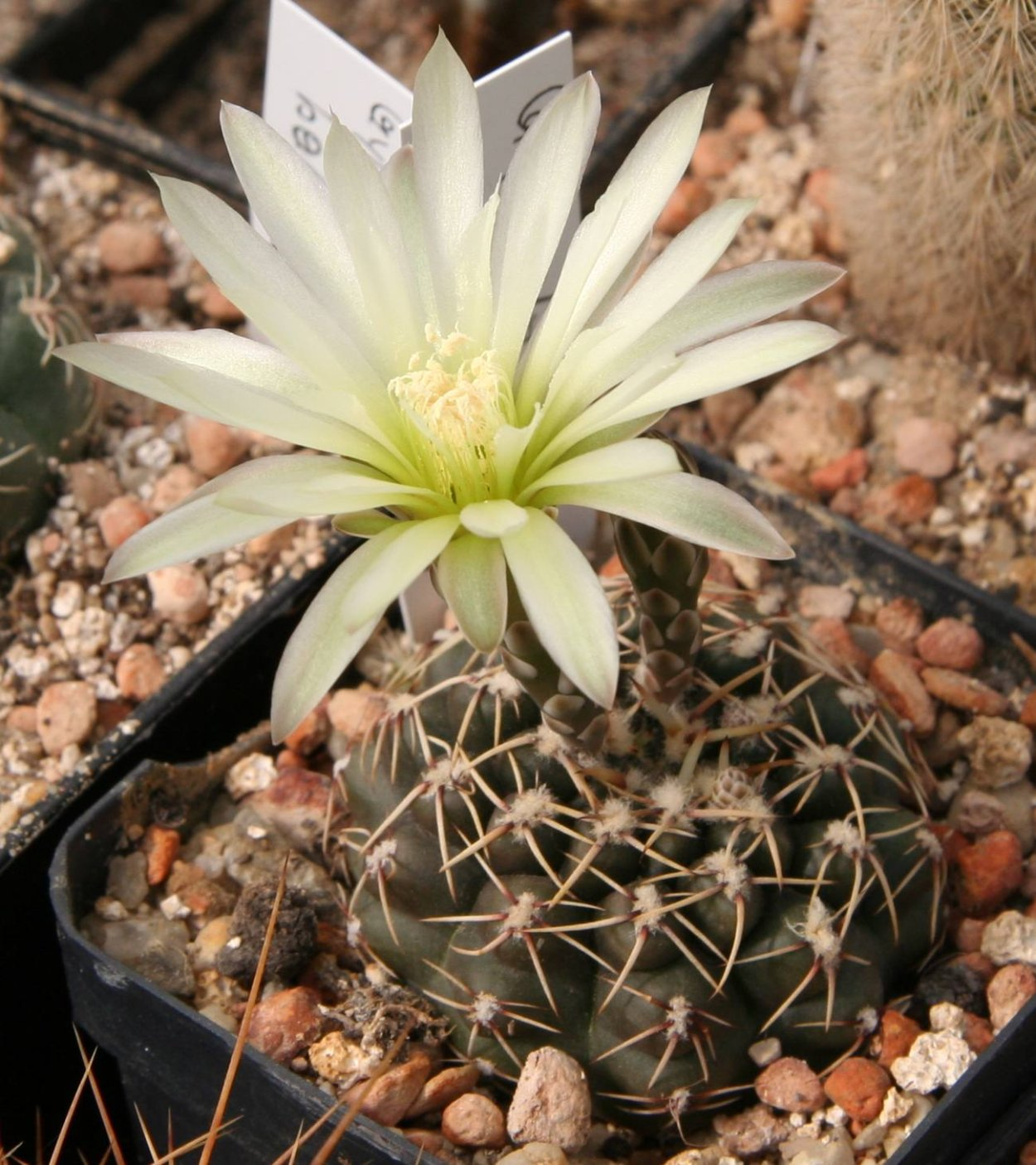

Conservation status
- Least Concern (IUCN 3.1)

Scientific classification
- Kingdom: Plantae
- Clade: Tracheophytes
- Clade: Angiosperms
- Clade: Eudicots
- Order: Caryophyllales
- Family: Cactaceae
- Subfamily: Cactoideae
- Genus: Gymnocalycium
- Species: G. schroederianum

Binomial name
- Gymnocalycium schroederianum Osten 1941

= Gymnocalycium schroederianum =

Species of cactus

Gymnocalycium schroederianum is a species of Gymnocalycium from Argentina and Uruguay.

== Description ==
Gymnocalycium schroederianum has a dark grey-green, depressed-spherical stem, reaching up to 7 cm tall and 14 cm wide, with about 24 broad, rounded ribs divided by prominent tubercles. It features around 7 radial spines, initially pale yellow and later ash-grey with red bases, varying in length, with the longest spine typically reaching the areole below. Flowers bloom near the apex, are bell- or funnel-shaped, about 70 mm long and 55 mm wide, with a slender tube adorned with olive-green, white-edged kidney-shaped scales, and pale greenish-white or yellowish-green perianth segments. The plant blooms readily from June through autumn, even as a young seedling, and produces narrowly pear-shaped, pale grey-green fruits around 25 mm long, containing matte black seeds.

== Distribution ==
This species is found growing in woodlands and open forest growing in clay soil in Buenos Aires, Corrientes, Santa Fe and Entre Ríos, Argentina and in Río Negro, Uruguay at elevations between 100 and 500 meters.

== Taxonomy ==
Gymnocalycium schroederianum was described by Cornelius Osten and published in Anales Museo Nacional Montevideo in 1941.
