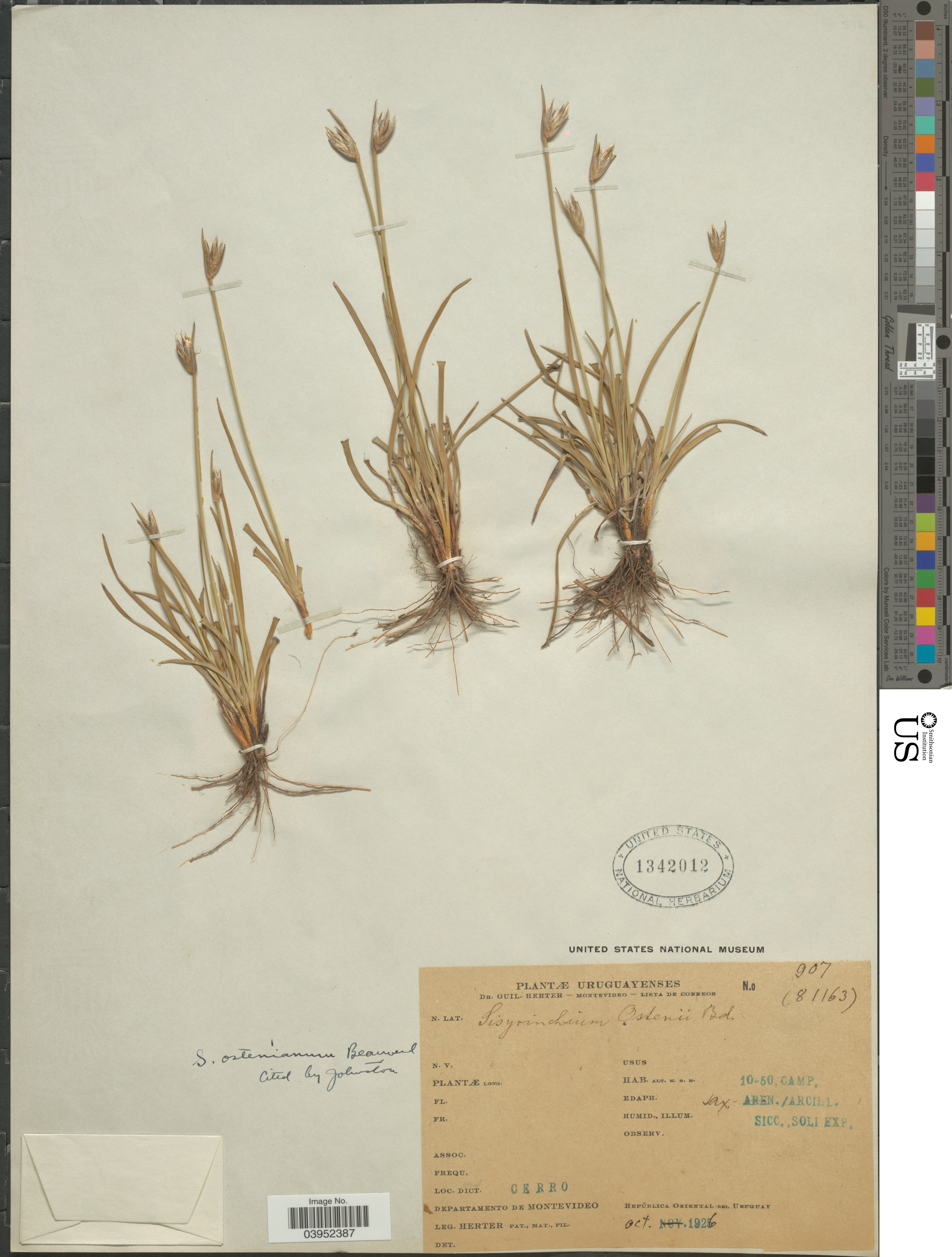
- Herbarium sheet for Sisyrinchium ostenianum Beauverd collected in Montevideo Department, Uruguay in October 1926

Scientific classification
- Kingdom: Plantae
- Clade: Tracheophytes
- Clade: Angiosperms
- Clade: Monocots
- Order: Asparagales
- Family: Iridaceae
- Genus: Sisyrinchium
- Section: Sisyrinchium sect. Cephalanthum
- Species: S. ostenianum

Binomial name
- Sisyrinchium ostenianum Beauverd

= Sisyrinchium ostenianum =

Species of flowering plant

Sisyrinchium ostenianum is a species of flowering plant in the family Iridaceae. It is distributed in northern Argentina, Uruguay and southern Brazil, where it grows in grasslands with sandy soils or on rocky outcrops, and sometimes on roadsides.

== Description ==
Sisyrinchium ostenianum is an erect, perennial herbaceous plant that grows 10–28 cm tall. The plant has thin, fibrous roots, above which grows a tuft of linear, upright basal leaves, 4.5–17 cm long by 1–3.3 mm wide. The leaves are smooth (glabrous) with pointed (acute) tips, and the leaf bases have a terracotta color.

The flowers are borne on an unbranched, upright stem 0.7–1.8 mm wide that rises 6.5–26 cm from the base. The stem may be cylindrical or have narrow, straight-edged wings. It terminates in a rigid, linear, slightly curved bract, 1.3–3.5 cm long that has conspicuous papery edges at the base. Arising from the stem at the point where the terminal bract connects is a small group of flower clusters, called a fasciculiform synflorescence. This synflorescence consists of 1–5 (occasionally up to 8) closely clustered rhipidia—a rhipidium is an alternately branched group of flowers contained between a pair of spathes (small bracts) that is characteristic of the Iridaceae family. In the case of Sisyrinchium ostenianum, each rhipidium begins with a very short peduncle 1–2 mm long and bears 1–21 flowers (occasionally up to 40). The lower valve of each spathe is 9–25 mm long by 2–5 mm wide and the upper valve is 8–16 mm long by 1.6–4 mm wide. The shape of the spathe valves is acute to long apiculate and they are glabrous, with a membranaceous (papery) margin for the first 1–2.5 mm (sometimes up to 3 mm). Each flower is borne on a pedicel 10–23 mm long, which is longer than spathes. The surface of the pedicel has yellow, straight trichomes (hair-like structures), terminating in a small head.

The perigon (the structure formed by the flower's tepals) is disk shaped, and yellow, light yellow or pale cream. The tepals are yellow or light green at the base, followed by a brown or burgundy (vinaceous) ring. Three burgundy-colored veins extend out from the ring along the yellowish tepals; these are visible from above and below. Liquid-preserved flowers are 10–18 mm in diameter. The six tepals are roughly equal in size, 5–9 mm long by 2–3.5 mm wide, oblanceolate in shape with emarginate or apiculate tips. The lower (abaxial) surface of each tepal bears sparse trichomes. The light yellow stamen filaments are fused into a cylindrical staminal column 2–3.2 mm long. The lowest 0.5–1.1 mm is covered with oil-producing trichomes (elaiophores); above that the trichomes are more sparsely distributed, but at the tip, just below the anthers, there is a dense crown of reflexed trichomes. The stamens bear yellow anthers 0.7–1 mm long (occasionally up to 1.3 mm) that are connected to the filaments at their bases (basifixed). The flower's ovary is generally spherical globose, measuring about 1.2–2 mm long and wide, and (similar to the pedicel) is covered with a fuzz of light-yellow, straight, capitate trichomes. Rising above the ovary, the style is 3.7–4.8 mm long, yellow and unbranched. At the top of the style, projecting above the anthers is the stigmatic region, which receives pollen. Each flower matures to form a hairy, khaki or brown fruiting capsule that is globose to subglobose, 3–4 mm long by 3.2–3.9 mm in diameter (sometimes as narrow as 2.3 mm). Flowers and fruits are reported from September to December.

== Taxonomy ==
Sisyrinchium ostenianum was described by the Swiss botanist Gustave Beauverd, among a large group of new species he described from Uruguay, in issue 14, series 2 of the Bulletin de la Société botanique de Genève (dated 1922, but published in 1923). The species is accepted as a correct name by the global taxonomy resource Plants of the World Online. Beauverd did not describe the male parts of the flower (androecium), and this description was added by Johnston in 1938.

Beauverd's description of the species was based on a holotype collected by Cornelius Osten on 20 October 1901, at Estacion Molles (now Carlos Reyles) in Durazno Department in central Uruguay and deposited at the herbarium of the Conservatoire et Jardin botaniques de la Ville de Genève with collector number 4306. The specific epithet "ostenianum" honors the collector.

Brazilian botanist Camila Dellanhese Inácio reviewed the species as part of her treatment of Sisyrinchium section Cephalanthum in her 2017 thesis. Some earlier authors on Sisyrinchium, such as Pierfelice Ravenna (2002) and Roitman et al. (2008) have treated S. ostenianum as a synonym for Sisyrinchium sellowianum, but Inácio rejects the synonymy. According to Inácio S. ostenianum can be easily distinguished from Sisyrinchium sellowianum and other species in section Cephalanthum by its reddish leaf sheaths (most visible in fresh material), its firm leaves and bracts and the recurved tip of the terminal bract, characters not present in S. sellowianum.

S. ostenianum is similar to several other species in Sisyrinchium section Cephalanthum. Most similar is Sisyrinchium albilapidense, which has a narrow and straight terminal bract (vs. a stiff and incurved bract in S. ostenianum) and sparse trichomes on the upper portion of the staminal column (whereas S. ostenianum has a dense crown of reflexed trichomes just below the anthers). While S. ostenianum has a broad distribution in northern Argentina, Uruguay and southern Brazil, its northern limit is around the Jacuí River in Rio Grande do Sul state, south of the one known population of S. albilapidense, near Lages in Santa Catarina state.

Sisyrinchium platycaule and Sisyrinchium sellowianum are similar species recorded from Santa Catarina state including some sites near Lages, but these can be distinguished by their cream or white flowers, whereas the flowers of S. ostenianum are yellow.

Two samples from S. ostenianum were included in the 2017 study of phylogenetic relationships within the genus Sisyrinchium. 171 samples representing 110 taxa were analyzed for a combination of nine coding and non-coding DNA regions. The resulting maximum likelihood phylogram confirmed that S. ostenianum is well supported as a member of section Cephalanthum and appears to be very closely related to Sisyrinchium claritae and Sisyrinchium commutatum subsp. capillare.

== Distribution ==
Sisyrinchium ostenianum has been recorded from the province of Corrientes in Argentina; from several departments of Uruguay (Canelones, Cerro Largo, Durazno, Montevideo, San José and Tacuarembó); and from the state of Rio Grande do Sul in Brazil. It has been recorded from grasslands with sandy soils, from rocky outcrops, and sometimes from roadsides, at elevations of 32–431 m. These sites are within the Low Altitude Temperate Grasslands, Temperate Shrubland and Subtropical/Temperate Coastal Scrub bioregions.

== Sources ==
- Beauverd, Gustave (1922), "Phanaerogamarum Novitates: VII. Nouvelle Iridacées de l'Uruguay", Bulletin de la Société botanique de Genève, 2, 14: 163–167
- Inácio, Camila (2017). Classificação infragenérica de Sisyrinchium L. (Iridaceae) e taxonomia das seções Cephalanthum e Viperella (pró parte) na região sul do Brasil [Infrageneric classification of Sisyrinchium L. (Iridaceae) and taxonomy of sections Cephalanthum and Viperella (in part) in the southern region of Brazil] (Thesis). hdl:10183/241254.
- Inácio, Camila Dellanhese; Chauveau, Olivier; Souza-Chies, Tatiana T.; Sauquet, Hervé; Eggers, Lilian (December 2017), "An updated phylogeny and infrageneric classification of the genus Sisyrinchium (Iridaceae): Challenges of molecular and morphological evidence", Taxon, 66 (6): 1317–1348, Bibcode:2017Taxon..66.1317I, doi:10.12705/666.4
- "Sisyrinchium ostenianum Ravenna". International Plant Names Index (IPNI). Royal Botanic Gardens, Kew.
- "Sisyrinchium ostenianum Ravenna". Plants of the World Online. Royal Botanic Gardens, Kew.
