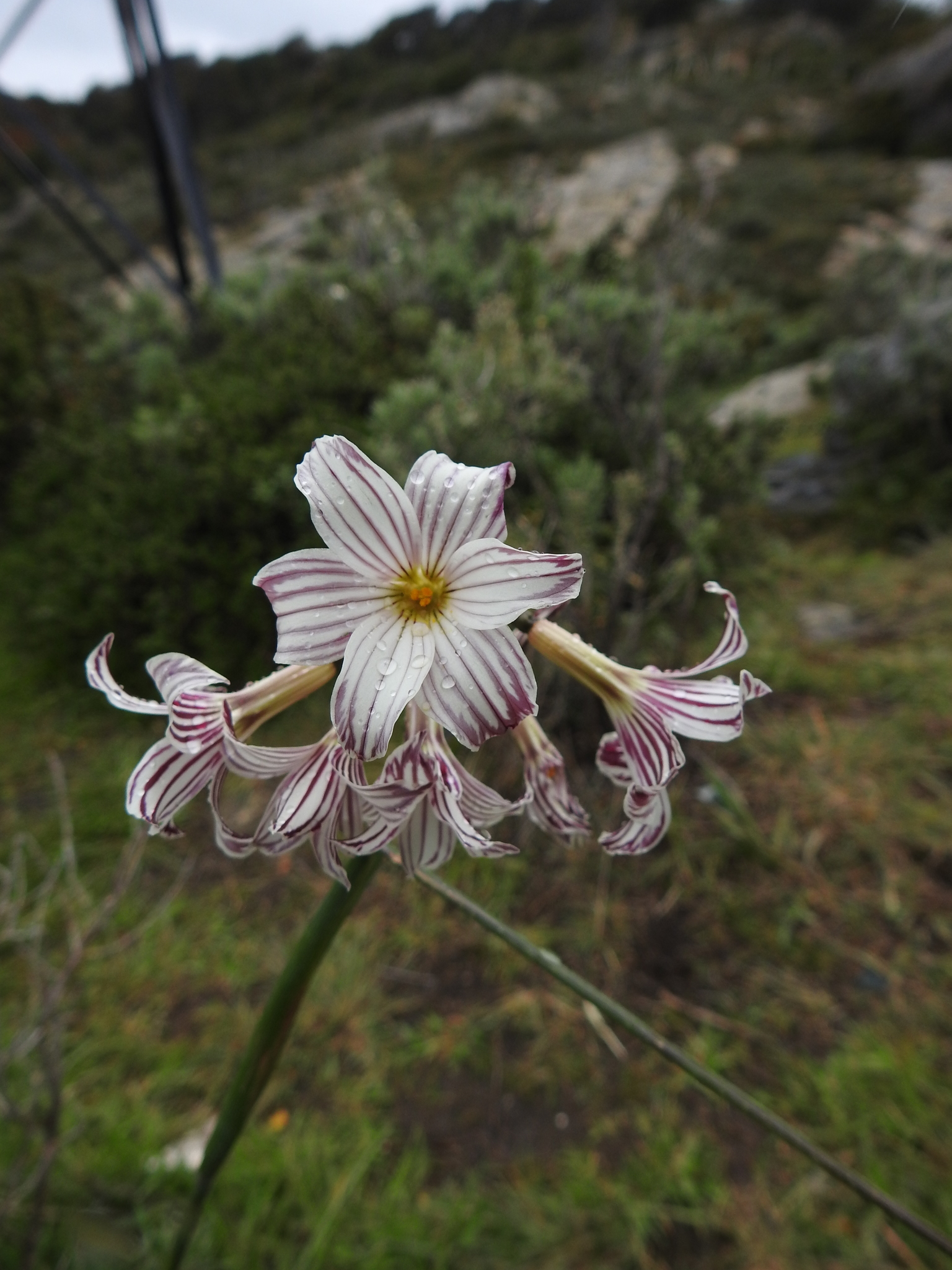

Scientific classification
- Kingdom: Plantae
- Clade: Tracheophytes
- Clade: Angiosperms
- Clade: Monocots
- Order: Asparagales
- Family: Iridaceae
- Genus: Olsynium
- Species: O. biflorum

Binomial name
- Olsynium biflorum Thunb.

= Olsynium biflorum =

Species of plant

Olsynium biflorum is a species of plant from the family Iridaceae. It is native to Argentina and Chile (Magallanes Region).
