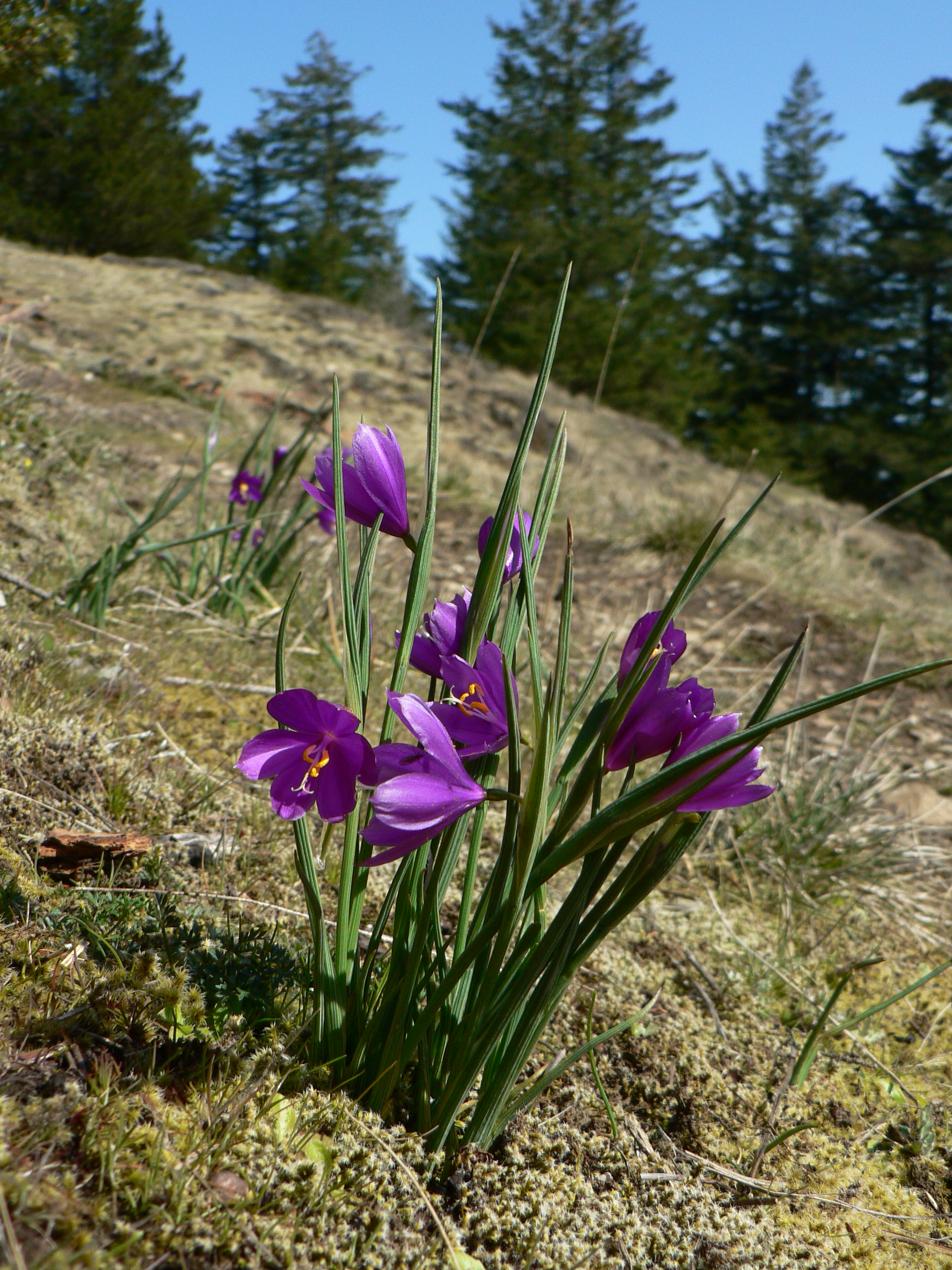
- Olysnium douglasii var. douglasii in Anacortes Community Forest Lands

Scientific classification
- Kingdom: Plantae
- Clade: Tracheophytes
- Clade: Angiosperms
- Clade: Monocots
- Order: Asparagales
- Family: Iridaceae
- Subfamily: Iridoideae
- Tribe: Sisyrinchieae
- Genus: Olsynium; Raf.

Type species
- Olsynium grandiflorum (Douglas ex Lindley) Rafinesque

Synonyms
- Phaiophleps Raf.; Symphyostemon Miers; Psithyrisma Herb.; Chamelum Phil.; Ona Ravenna

= Olsynium =

Genus of flowering plants

Olsynium is a genus of summer-dormant rhizomatous perennial flowering plants in the iris family Iridaceae, native to sunny hillsides in South America and western North America.

== Description ==
Height is 10–40 centimetres (4–16 in) tall. Leaves are linear, 4–30 centimetres (1.6–11.8 in) long and 1–3 millimetres (0.04–0.12 in) broad.

Flowers are bell-shaped, with six white, pink, or lilac tepals, and bloom from late winter to spring.

== Etymology ==
The genus name is derived from the Greek words ol, meaning "a little", and syn-, meaning "joined", referring to the stamens.

== Taxonomy ==
The taxon Olsynium was formerly considered as part of the genus Sisyrinchium. The following species are recognised in the genus Olsynium:

Image	Scientific name	Distribution
	Olsynium acaule (Klatt) Goldblatt	Peru, Bolivia, northwestern Argentina
	Olsynium andinum (Phil.) Ravenna	central Chile, Neuquén Province in Argentina
	Olsynium biflorum (Thunb.) Goldblatt	Santa Cruz + Tierra del Fuego Provinces in southern Argentina
	Olsynium bodenbenderi (Kurtz) Goldblatt	Mendoza Province in Argentina
	Olsynium chrysochromum J.M.Watson & A.R.Flores	central Chile
	Olsynium douglasii (A.Dietr.) E.P.Bicknell	British Columbia, Washington, Oregon, extreme northern California, Idaho, northern Nevada, northwestern Utah
	Olsynium filifolium (Gaudich.) Goldblatt	southern Argentina, Falkland Islands
	Olsynium junceum (E.Mey. ex C.Presl) Goldblatt	Bolivia, Argentina, Chile
	Olsynium lyckholmii (Dusén) Goldblatt	central Chile, southern Argentina
	Olsynium nigricans (Phil.) R.A.Rodr. & Martic.	Maule Province in Chile
	Olsynium obscurum (Cav.) Goldblatt	southern Chile, Tierra del Fuego Province in Argentina
	Olsynium philippii (Klatt) Goldblatt	central Chile
	Olsynium porphyreum (Kraenzl.) Ravenna	Peru
	Olsynium scirpoideum (Poepp.) Goldblatt	central + northern Chile, Rio Negro Province in Argentina
	Olsynium stoloniferum Ravenna	O'Higgins Province in Chile
	Olsynium trinerve (Baker) R.A.Rodr. & Martic.	Costa Rica, Venezuela, Colombia, Ecuador, Peru, Bolivia, northern Chile
	Olsynium villosum Ravenna	Santiago Province in Chile
