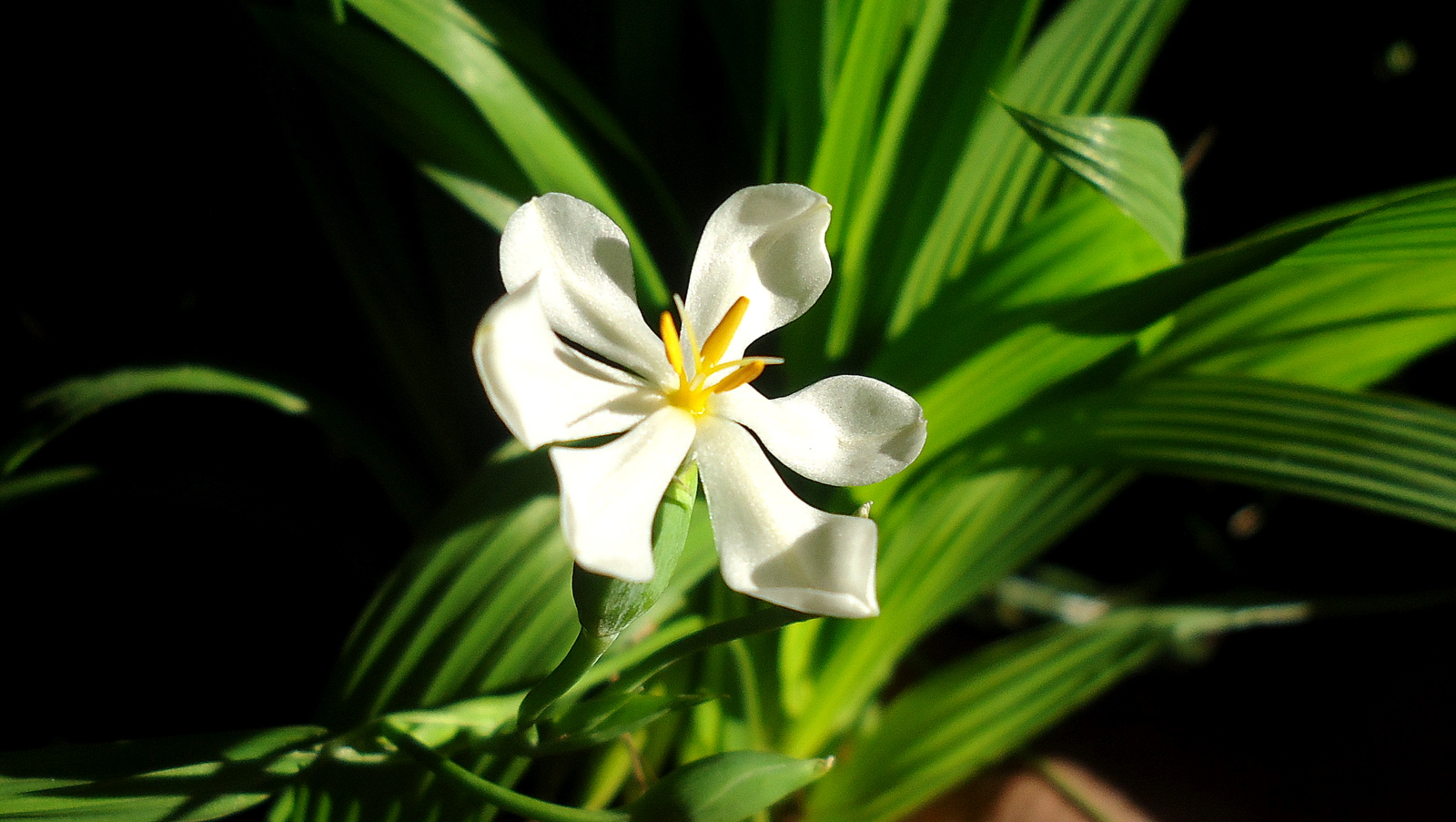
- Eleutherine bulbosa

Scientific classification
- Kingdom: Plantae
- Clade: Tracheophytes
- Clade: Angiosperms
- Clade: Monocots
- Order: Asparagales
- Family: Iridaceae
- Subfamily: Iridoideae
- Tribe: Tigridieae
- Genus: Eleutherine; Herb.

Type species
- Eleutherine plicata Herb.

Synonyms
- Galatea Salisb. 1812; Galatea Herb. 1819 name published without description; Galatea Salisb. ex Kuntze 1891 not Salisb. 1812

= Eleutherine =

Genus of flowering plants

Eleutherine is a genus of herbaceous, perennial and bulbous plants in the family Iridaceae, first described as a genus in 1843. It is native to Latin America and the West Indies.

The genus name may be derived from the Greek word eleuthera, meaning "free".

Species

- Eleutherine angusta Ravenna - Paraguay, Mato Grosso do Sul
- Eleutherine bulbosa (Mill.) Urb. - West Indies, South America; naturalized in Zaire, Réunion, India, Cambodia, Vietnam
- Eleutherine citriodora (Ravenna) Ravenna - Bolivia, northern Argentina
- Eleutherine latifolia (Standl. & L.O.Williams) Ravenna - Mexico, Central America, Bolivia, northern Argentina
