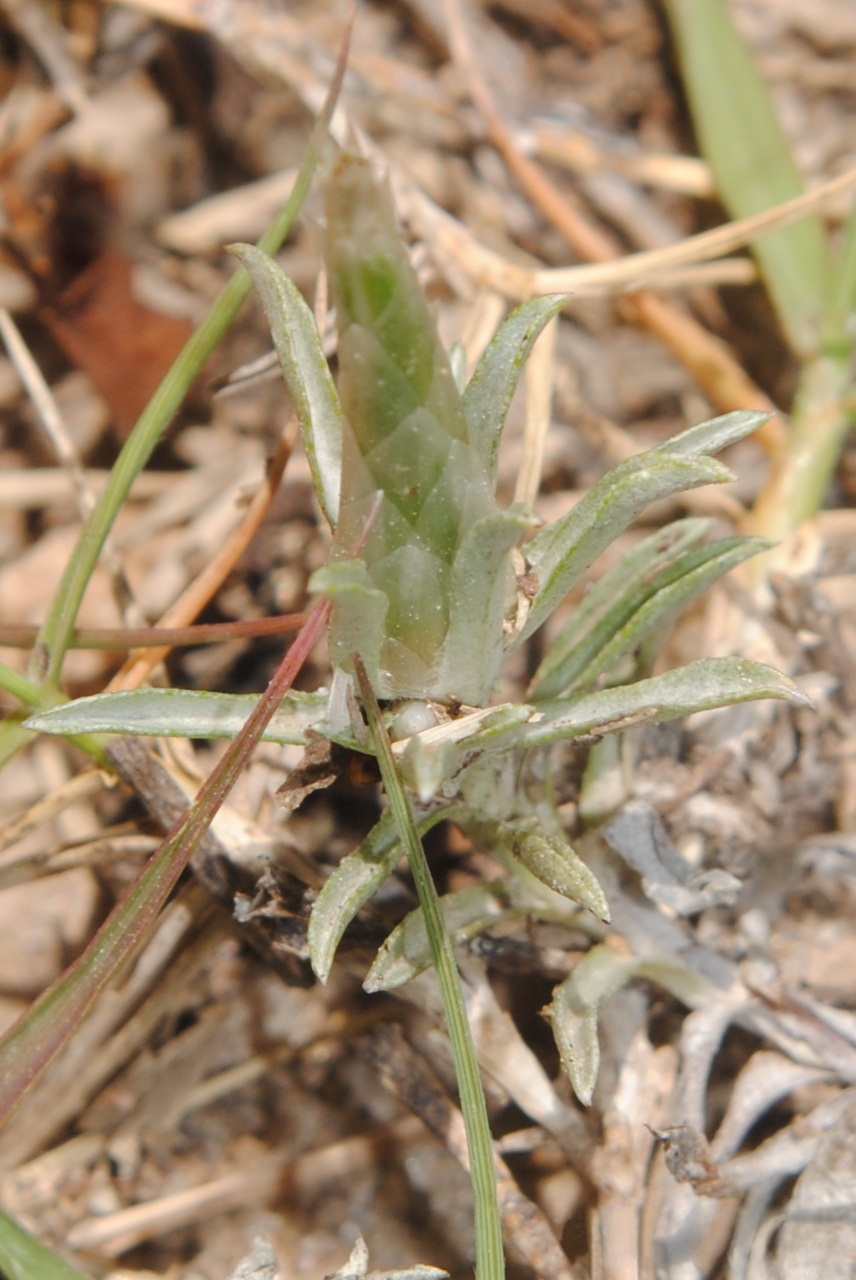

Scientific classification
- Kingdom: Plantae
- Clade: Embryophytes
- Clade: Tracheophytes
- Clade: Angiosperms
- Clade: Eudicots
- Clade: Asterids
- Order: Asterales
- Family: Asteraceae
- Subfamily: Asteroideae
- Tribe: Gnaphalieae
- Genus: Berroa; Beauverd
- Species: B. gnaphalioides

Binomial name
- Berroa gnaphalioides (Less.) Beauverd

Synonyms
- Gnaphalium gnaphalioides (Less.) Kuntze; Lucilia nitens Baker; Gnaphalium arnottii Kuntze; Lucilia argentea Hook. & Arn.

= Berroa =

Genus of flowering plants

Berroa is a monotypic genus of flowering plants in the family Asteraceae, containing the single species Berroa gnaphalioides. It is native to South America (Uruguay, southern Brazil, northeastern Argentina).
