= Acacia beauverdiana =

Pukkati

Scientific classification
- Kingdom: Plantae
- Clade: Tracheophytes
- Clade: Angiosperms
- Clade: Eudicots
- Clade: Rosids
- Order: Fabales
- Family: Fabaceae
- Subfamily: Caesalpinioideae
- Clade: Mimosoid clade
- Genus: Acacia
- Species: A. beauverdiana

Binomial name
- Acacia beauverdiana Ewart & Sharman
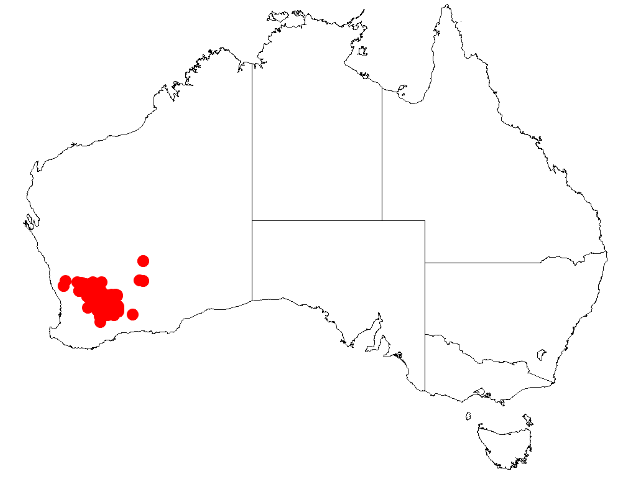
- Occurrence data from Australasian Virtual Herbarium

Species of tree

Acacia beauverdiana, commonly known as pukkati, is a species of flowering plant in the family Fabaceae and is endemic to inland areas of south-western Western Australia. It is a rounded shrub or tree with upright to erect linear to narrowly oblong phyllodes, golden-yellow flowers arranged in oblong to spherical heads, usually arranged singly or in pairs in leaf axils, and linear, leathery pods up to 90 mm (3.5 in) long.

== Description ==
Acacia beauverdiana is a rounded shrub 1–4 m (3 ft 3 in – 13 ft 1 in) high, rarely a tree 3–8 m (9.8–26.2 ft) high, with upright to erect, linear to narrowly oblong phyllodes 70–130 mm (2.8–5.1 in) long and 1.5–3 mm (0.059–0.118 in) wide. There are many fine, parallel veins on the surface of the phyllodes and the tip is pointed, curved or hooked. There are one or two oblong to spherical heads in axils on a peduncle 1.5–4 mm (0.059–0.157 in) long, the heads 6–8 mm (0.24–0.31 in) long and 5–7 mm (0.20–0.28 in) wide with 28 to 36 golden-yellow flowers. Flowering occurs from July to October, and the pods are leathery, linear, up to 90 mm (3.5 in) long and 2.5–3 mm (0.098–0.118 in) wide, containing narrowly oblong seeds 2.5–4 mm (0.098–0.157 in) long with a long, cone-shaped aril.

== Taxonomy ==
Acacia beauverdiana was first formally described in 1916 by Alfred James Ewart and Percy J. Sharman in the Proceedings of the Royal Society of Victoria from specimens collected by Max Koch near Cowcowing in 1904. The specific epithet (beauverdiana) honours the Swiss botanist, Gustave Beauverd.

== Aboriginal uses ==
The Noongar people of southwest Western Australia burned the top small branches of pukkati and mixed the ash with equal parts of pituri (Duboisia hopwoodii) to relieve intense pains such as toothache.
