= Gustave Beauverd =

Swiss botanist

Gustave Beauverd (1867–1942) was a Swiss botanist, specializing in Pteridophytes, Bryophytes, and Spermatophytes.

For a period of time he worked at the "Herbier Bossier", and is remembered for his investigations of the genus Melampyrum. He was a co-author of the series "Icones florae Alpinae plantarum", and the author of many works on diverse botanical subjects. In 1931 he became a member of the Société botanique de France.

He is the taxonomic authority of the genera Berroa, Parantennaria, Psychrophyton and Stuckertiella. The genus Beauverdia (family Alliaceae) was named after him by Wilhelm Gustav Franz Herter, and plants with the specific epithet of beauverdiana honor him, examples being Acacia beauverdiana and Photinia beauverdiana

== Selected works ==
- Bulletin de L'Herbier Boissier V2: 1902, (1902).
- Contributions à la flore de l'Afrique australe, 1913 – Contribution to the flora of southern Africa.
- Monographie du genre Melampyrum L., 1916 – Monograph on the genus Melampyrum.
- Contribution à la Géographie botanique des Alpes de Savoie, 1922 – Contribution to the phytogeography of the Savoie Alps.
