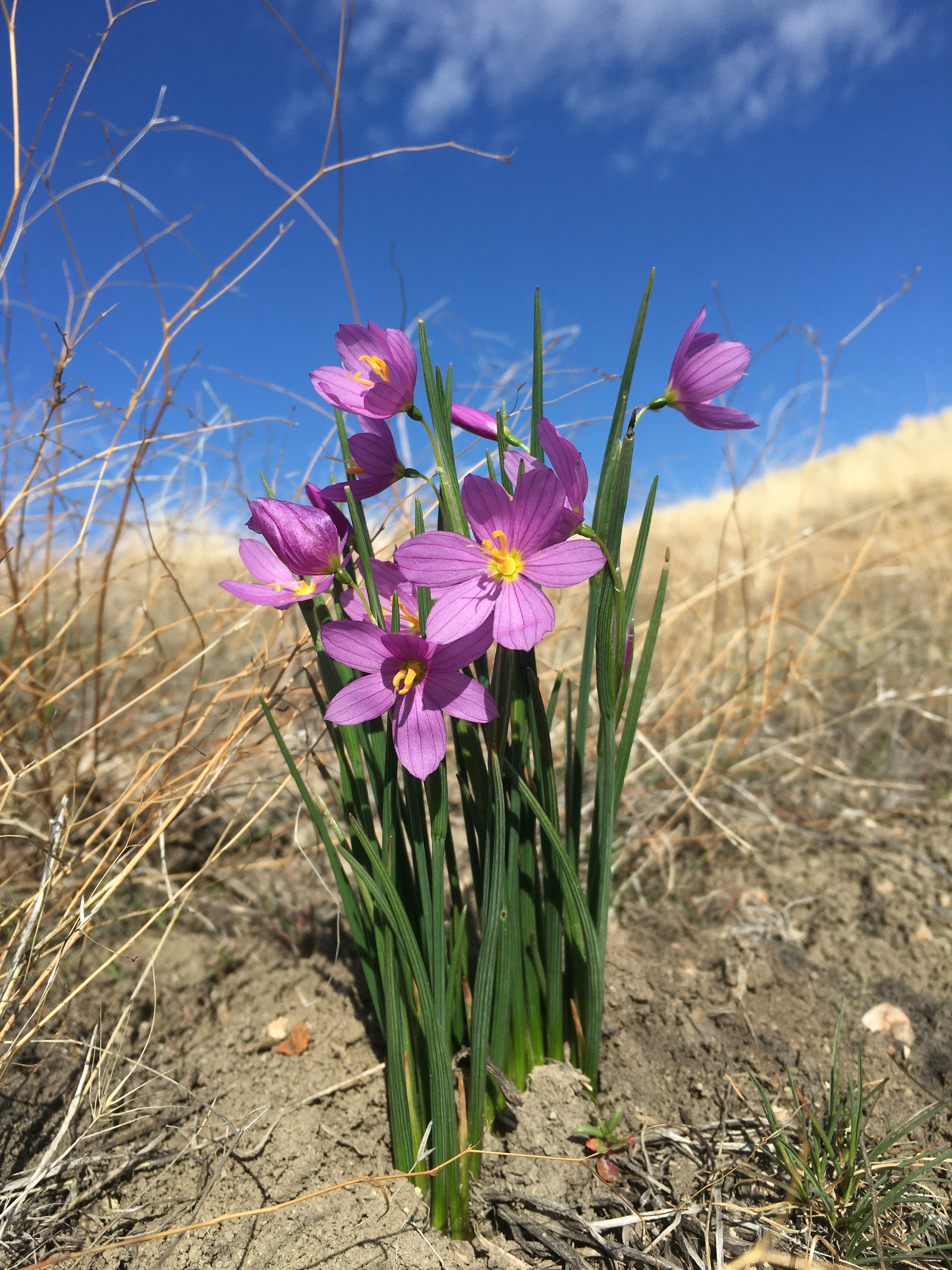
- Olsynium douglasii in the BLM Lands of Oregon, USA

Scientific classification
- Kingdom: Plantae
- Clade: Tracheophytes
- Clade: Angiosperms
- Clade: Monocots
- Order: Asparagales
- Family: Iridaceae
- Genus: Olsynium
- Species: O. douglasii

Binomial name
- Olsynium douglasii (A.Dietr.) E.P.Bicknell

Synonyms
- Eriphilema grandiflora (Raf.) Herb.; Olsynium grandiflorum Raf.; Sisyrinchium douglasii A.Dietr.; Sisyrinchium grandiflorum Douglas ex Lindl.; Sisyrinchium inalatum A.Nelson

= Olsynium douglasii =

Species of flowering plant

Olsynium douglasii is a species of flowering plant in the iris family (Iridaceae). Common names include Douglas' olsynium, Douglas' grasswidow, grass-widow, blue-eyed grass, purple-eyed-grass, and satin flower, It is the only species in the genus Olsynium in North America, the remaining 11 species being from South America. It was formerly treated in the related genus Sisyrinchium. Despite the common names, it is not a true grass (Poaceae).

It is a bulb forming herbaceous perennial, growing 10–40 cm (3.9–15.7 in) tall. The leaves are slender, linear, 10–30 cm (3 7/8–11 3/4 in) long and 1.5–3 mm broad, usually with pale longitudinal stripes. The showy flowers appear in early spring and are bell-shaped to star-shaped, 15–25 mm long, with six purple tepals (sometimes pale or white). The anthers are dark yellow to orange and the filaments bearing them are fused only on the lower part.

It is native to western North America, from southern British Columbia south to northern California, and east to northwest Utah. It grows in open areas usually in full sun.

There are two varieties:

- Olsynium douglasii var. douglasii. Coastal western North America. Flower filaments with a narrow base
- Olsynium douglasii var. inflatum. Interior western North America. Flower filaments with an inflated base

This species has won the Royal Horticultural Society's Award of Garden Merit.

== Gallery ==
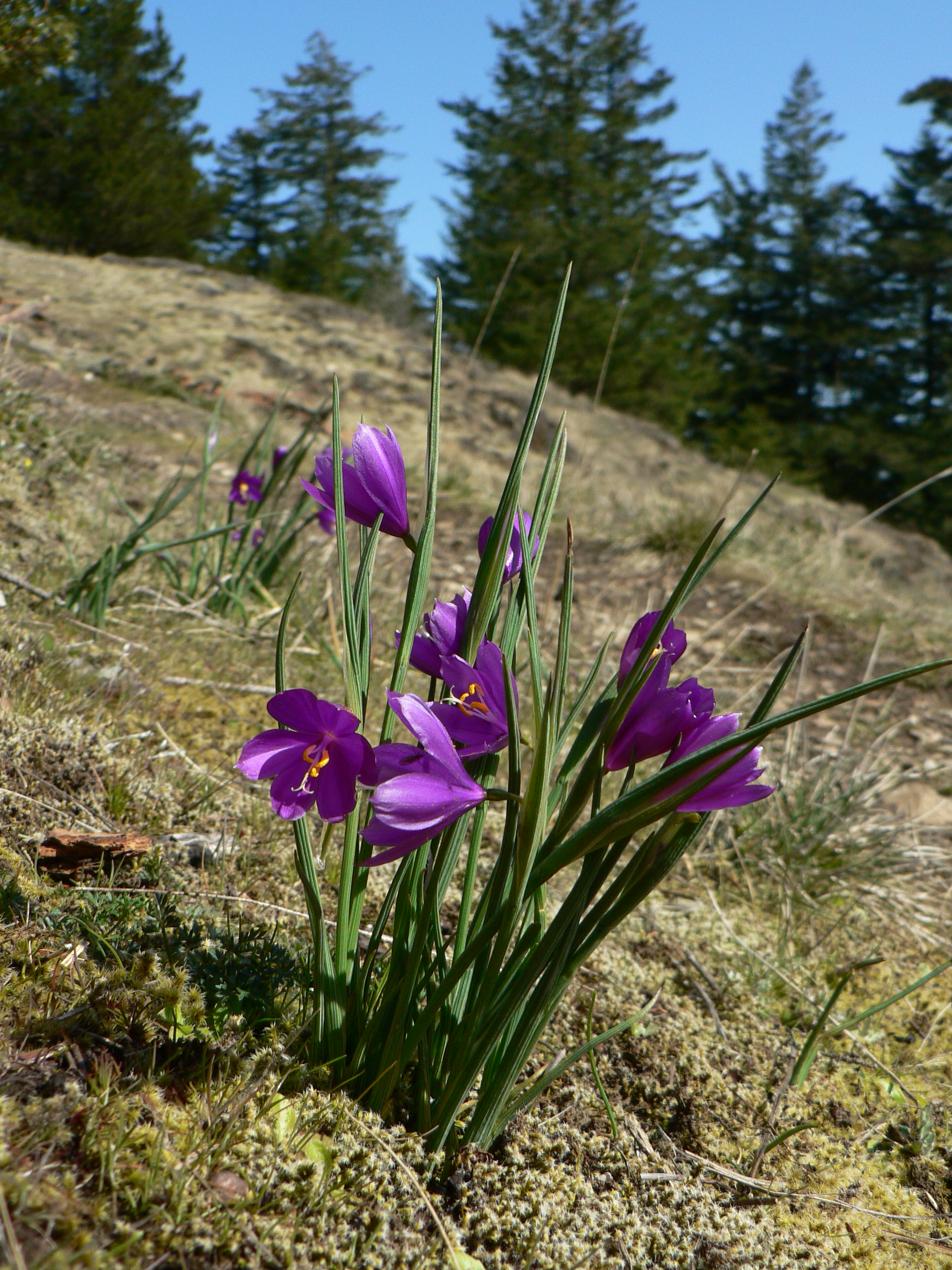
Olsynium douglasii in Anacortes Community Forest Lands, Washington USA

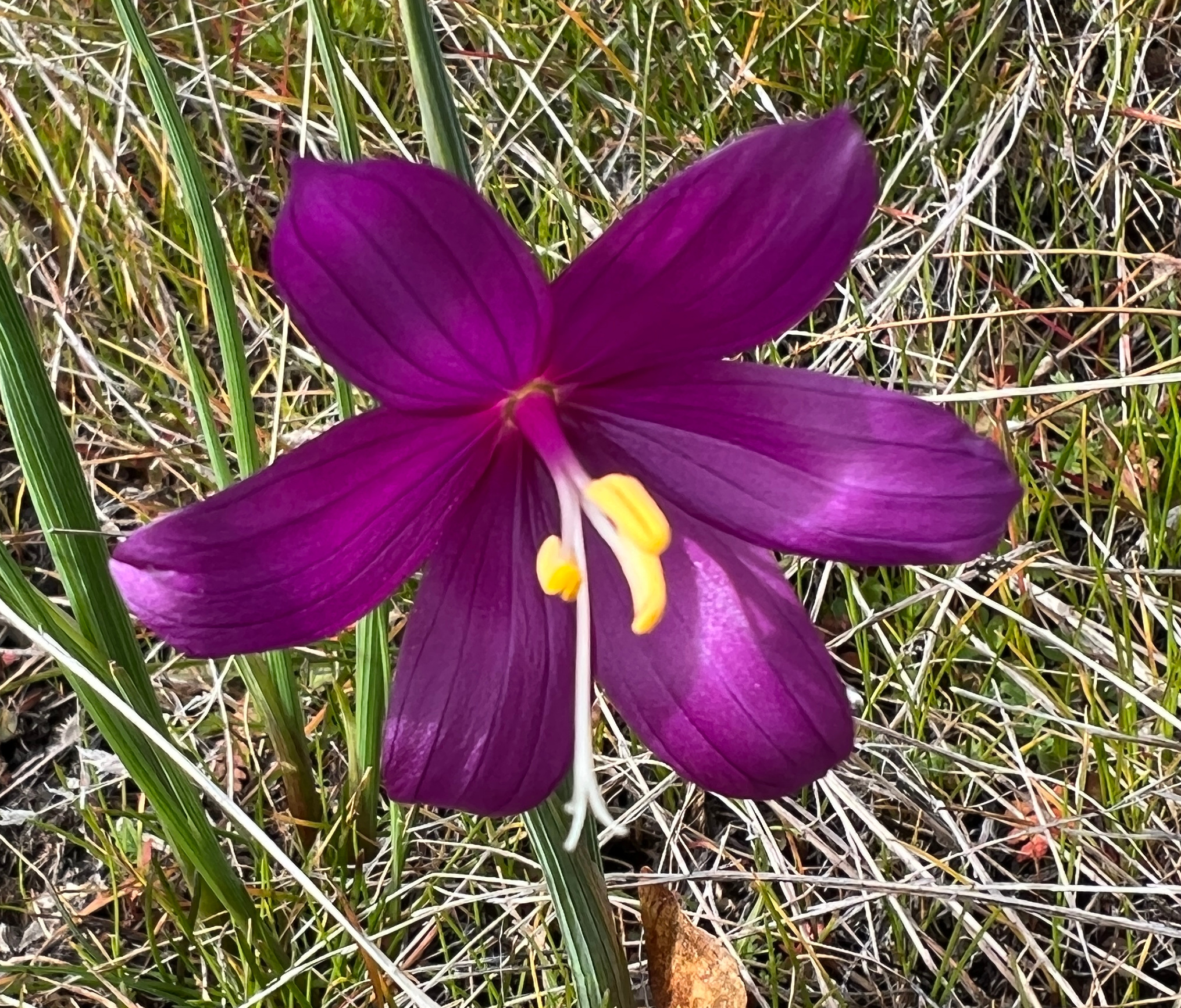
Flower showing partially fused filaments bearing yellow anthers
