= South Prairie Lake =

Lake in Skamania County, Washington, United States

Coordinates: 45°54′46″N 121°41′49″W

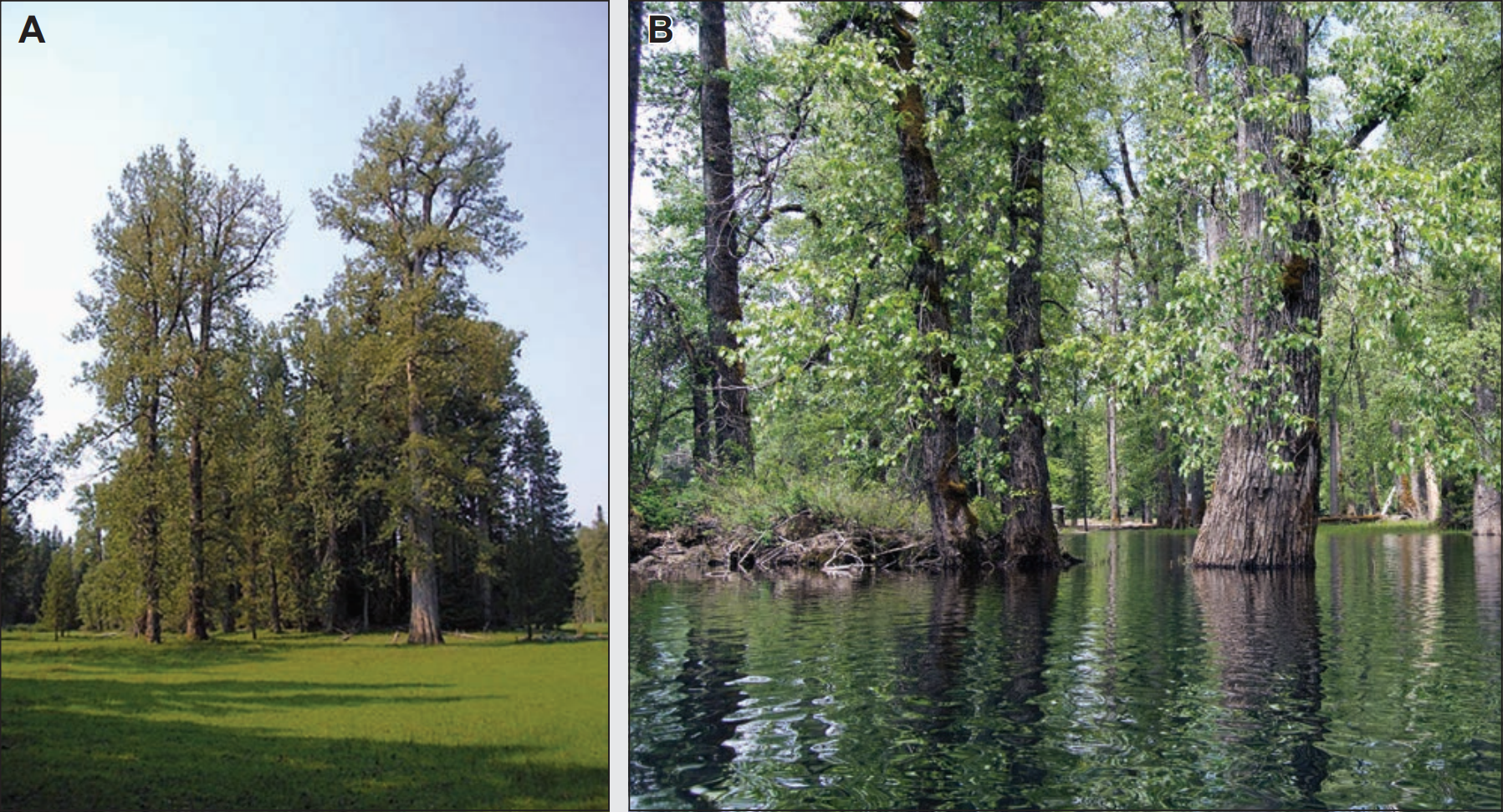
Large black cottonwood trees in South Prairie meadow (A) during summer and (B) during spring with seasonal flooding.

South Prairie is a seasonal lake located within Gifford Pinchot National Forest in Washington, United States. For most of the year, South Prairie is a dry meadow, but every spring, it becomes an 85-acre lake. Specific mechanisms that cause the seasonal inundation of the meadow are not clearly understood. It is possible that ice accumulation in the adjacent Big Lava Bed prevents drainage until weather warms sufficiently to melt the ice.

A small grove of quaking aspen exists at the edge of the coniferous forested area that is annually inundated. Large-diameter black cottonwoods are found within the meadow itself; these cottonwoods stand in the middle of the lake when the meadow is flooded.

South Prairie is home to the largest known population of pale blue-eyed grass, Sisyrinchium sarmentosum, a rare species of iris that was first discovered here in 1893. South Prairie is the type locality, and hosts the largest and most genetically variable known population of the species.
