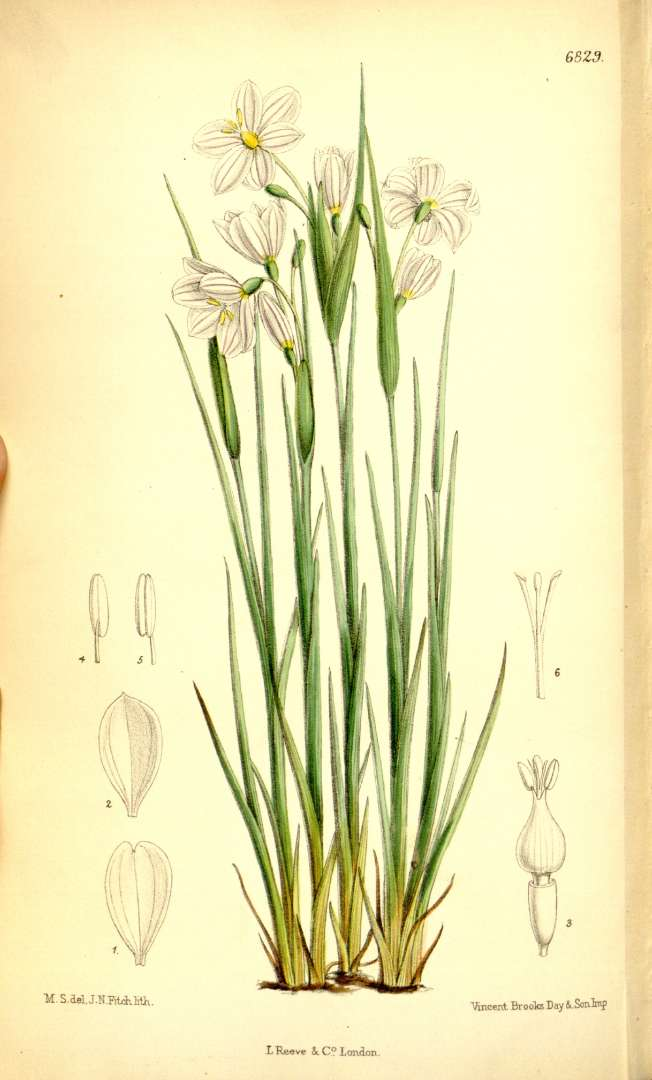
- An 1885 lithograph of Olsynium filifolium, then known as Sisyrinchium filifolium

Scientific classification
- Kingdom: Plantae
- Clade: Tracheophytes
- Clade: Angiosperms
- Clade: Monocots
- Order: Asparagales
- Family: Iridaceae
- Genus: Olsynium
- Species: O. filifolium

Binomial name
- Olsynium filifolium Gaudich.

Synonyms
- Bermudiana filifolia Olsynium lainezii Phaiophleps lainezii Sisyrinchium filifolium Sisyrinchium filiforme Sisyrinchium gaudichaudii Sisyrinchium junceum subsp. filifolium Symphyostemon lainezii

= Olsynium filifolium =

Species of flowering plant

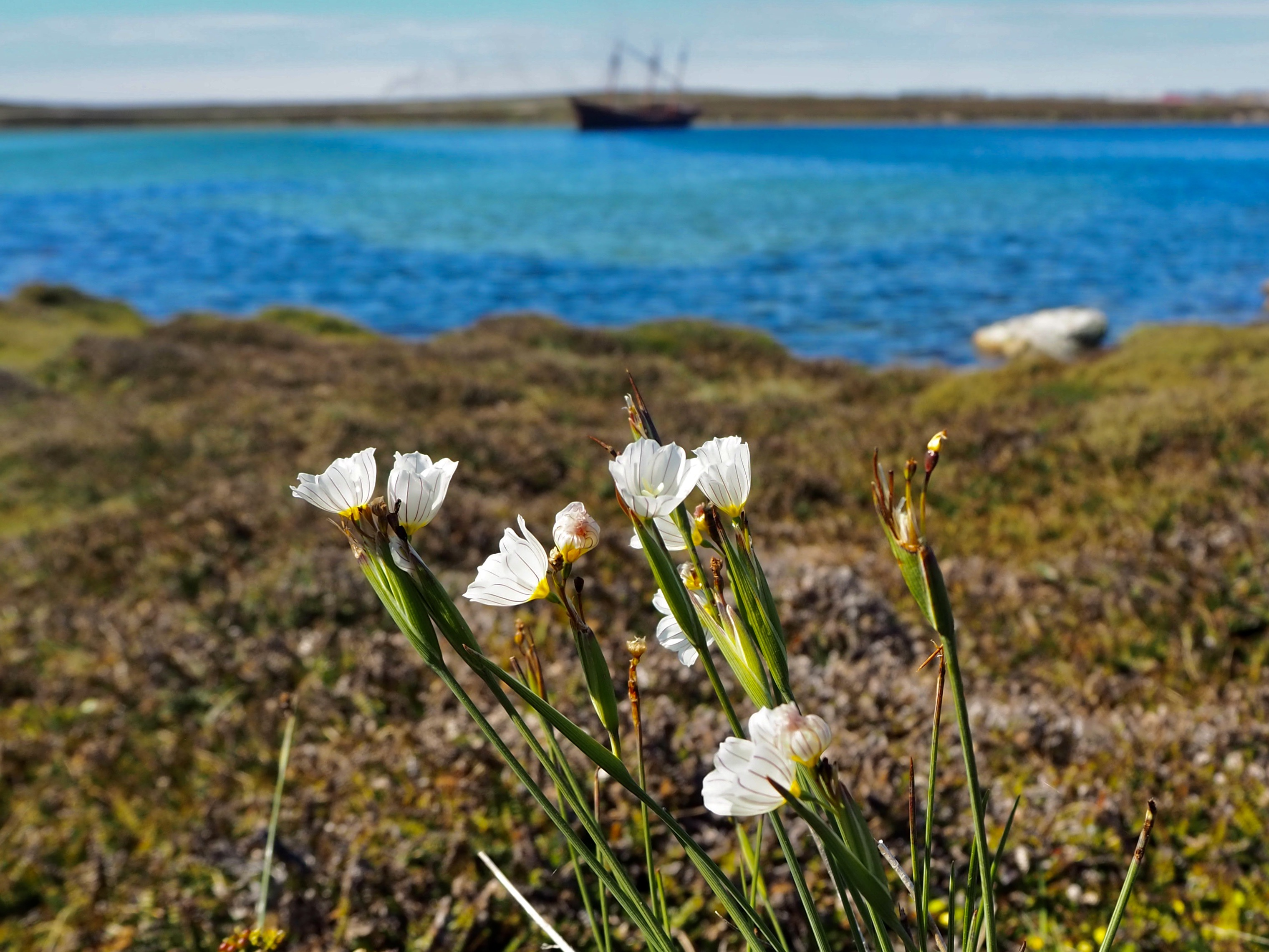
Pale maiden with the Lady Elizabeth in the distance, Whalebone Cove

Olsynium filifolium (pale maiden), or Bermudiana filifolia, is the only species of the iris family native to the Falkland Islands.

== Taxonomy and habitat ==
It is much better known by its former name Sisyrinchium filifolium. Although it is no longer as common as it once was, it is widely distributed on the islands, and favours temperate dwarf shrub heath. It (or a closely related species) is also found in Patagonia.

== Description ==
Height is 10–30 centimetres (4–12 in) tall. Leaves are linear, 4–20 centimetres (1.6–7.9 in) long and 1–3 millimetres (0.04–0.12 in) broad.

Flowers are sweet smelling, and bell-shaped with six white tepals with pale purplish-red markings. They bloom in spring, particularly in November.
