= Sisyrinchium venezolense =

Scientific classification
- Kingdom: Plantae
- Clade: Tracheophytes
- Clade: Angiosperms
- Clade: Monocots
- Order: Asparagales
- Family: Iridaceae
- Genus: Sisyrinchium
- Species: S. venezolense

Binomial name
- Sisyrinchium venezolense Ravenna

Species of flowering plant

Sisyrinchium venezolense is a species of flowering plant in the family Iridaceae. It is endemic to Venezuela, where it mostly grows in the subtropical biome.

== Taxonomic history ==
Sisyrinchium venezolense was described by the Chilean botanist Pierfelice Ravenna in 2003. Ravenna's description appeared in issue 13, volume 8 of his self-published journal Onira, which had very limited distribution. Subsequent review of this protologue has been limited. The species is accepted as a correct name by the global taxonomy resource Plants of the World Online.

Ravenna's description of the species was based on a holotype collected by Wilhelm "Willy" Gehriger at Páramo de Mucurubá in the state of Mérida on May 21, 1930, numbered Gehriger 116 and deposited at the herbarium of the Universidad Central de Venezuela. A 2024 investigation into the status of type specimens cited by Ravenna was unable to locate the holotype of Sisyrinchium venezolense at the herbarium in Venezuela, and concluded that it "should be considered lost".

== Sources ==
- "Sisyrinchium venezolense Ravenna". Plants of the World Online. Royal Botanic Gardens, Kew.
- "Sisyrinchium venezolense Ravenna". International Plant Name Index. The Royal Botanic Gardens, Kew, Harvard University Herbaria & Libraries and Australian National Herbarium. 2024.
- García, Nicolás; Raven, Peter H.; Meerow, Alan W. (2024), "Pierfelice Ravenna (1938–2022)—Life, New Names, and Confusion", Annals of the Missouri Botanical Garden, 109: 490–516, Bibcode:2024AnMBG.109..490G, doi:10.3417/2024933
