= Sisyrinchium pearcei =

Scientific classification
- Kingdom: Plantae
- Clade: Tracheophytes
- Clade: Angiosperms
- Clade: Monocots
- Order: Asparagales
- Family: Iridaceae
- Genus: Sisyrinchium
- Species: S. pearcei

Binomial name
- Sisyrinchium pearcei Phil.

Species of plant

Sisyrinchium pearcei is a species of plant from the family Iridaceae. This species is endemic to Southern Chile (from Araucanía to Magallanes regions).
