= Sisyrinchium vestitum =

Scientific classification
- Kingdom: Plantae
- Clade: Tracheophytes
- Clade: Angiosperms
- Clade: Monocots
- Order: Asparagales
- Family: Iridaceae
- Genus: Sisyrinchium
- Species: S. vestitum

Binomial name
- Sisyrinchium vestitum Ravenna

Species of flowering plant

Sisyrinchium vestitum is a species of flowering plant in the family Iridaceae. It is endemic to the region around Santiago, Chile, where it mostly grows in the temperate biome.

== Taxonomic history ==
Sisyrinchium vestitum was described by the Chilean botanist Pierfelice Ravenna in 2003. Ravenna's description appeared in issue 6, volume 8 of his self-published journal Onira, which had very limited distribution. Subsequent review of this protologue has been limited. The species is accepted as a correct name by the global taxonomy resource Plants of the World Online. However, the regional Flora del Cono Sur, published by the Instituto de Botánica Darwinion in Argentina, regards Sisyrinchium vestitum as a heterotypic synonym for Sisyrinchium graminifolium.

Ravenna's description of the species was based on a holotype he collected in the Santiago area on November 10, 2002, numbered Ravenna 4997.

== Sources ==
- "Sisyrinchium vestitum Ravenna". Flora del Cono Sur. Instituto de Botánica Darwinion. 2018.
- "Sisyrinchium vestitum Ravenna". Plants of the World Online. Royal Botanic Gardens, Kew.
- "Sisyrinchium vestitum Ravenna". International Plant Name Index. The Royal Botanic Gardens, Kew, Harvard University Herbaria & Libraries and Australian National Herbarium. 2024.
