= Sisyrinchium sarmentosum =

Conservation status
- Imperiled (NatureServe)

Scientific classification
- Kingdom: Plantae
- Clade: Tracheophytes
- Clade: Angiosperms
- Clade: Monocots
- Order: Asparagales
- Family: Iridaceae
- Genus: Sisyrinchium
- Species: S. sarmentosum

Binomial name
- Sisyrinchium sarmentosum Suksd. ex Greene

Species of flowering plant

Sisyrinchium sarmentosum is a species of flowering plant in the iris family known by the common names mountain blue-eyed grass and pale blue-eyed-grass. It is native to the Pacific Northwest of North America, where it is known from a part of the Cascade Mountains in Washington and Oregon.

This perennial herb grows up to 32 centimeters tall. The grasslike leaves, located around the base of the plant, are linear in shape and up to 20 centimeters long. Each flower has six pale blue tepals with yellow bases. They are a centimeter long or slightly longer. Each has a rounded tip with a bristle in the center. The fruit is a rounded brown capsule half a centimeter long. Flowering occurs in June at lower elevations and July at higher. The flowers open in late morning or mid-day.

This plant grows in mountain meadows in southern Washington and northern Oregon. Most of the 22 known populations are found within the Gifford Pinchot and Mt. Hood National Forests. The plants occur at elevations within the Pacific silver fir and grand fir zones. The habitat is usually wet, and snowy during the winter. The meadows are surrounded by conifers and meadow species may include Deschampsia cespitosa, Alopecurus pratensis, Phleum pratense, Poa palustris, Juncus tenuis, Juncus ensifolius, Carex vesicaria, Carex microptera, Agrostis idahoensis, Fragaria virginiana var. platypetala, Prunella vulgaris, Trifolium repens, Potentilla drummondii, Ranunculus flammula, Solidago canadensis, Veronica scutellata, Botrychium multifidum, Antennaria microphylla and Viola adunca.

This plant reproduces sexually and by cloning. Grazing by cattle reduces the plant's ability to reproduce by seed, so cloning is often more common. This tends to reduce the genetic diversity of populations, so grazing is a major threat to the species. At least 82% of all the plants are located on one grazing allotment on the Gifford Pinchot National Forest. Fire suppression is another threat. When the natural fire regime is prevented, large and woody vegetation encroaches on the plant's meadow habitat, producing competition and shade. Invasive species of plants are a threat, including Cynoglossum officinale, Senecio jacobaea, Cirsium arvense, and Cirsium vulgare. Other threats include recreation, hybridization with Sisyrinchium idahoense, and logging.

== See also ==
- South Prairie Lake
