= Sisyrinchium albilapidense =

Scientific classification
- Kingdom: Plantae
- Clade: Tracheophytes
- Clade: Angiosperms
- Clade: Monocots
- Order: Asparagales
- Family: Iridaceae
- Genus: Sisyrinchium
- Section: Sisyrinchium sect. Cephalanthum
- Species: S. albilapidense

Binomial name
- Sisyrinchium albilapidense Ravenna

Species of flowering plant

Sisyrinchium albilapidense is a species of flowering plant in the family Iridaceae. It is recorded only from a single location in the state of Santa Catarina, Brazil, where it grows in subtropical mixed forest.

== Description ==
Sisyrinchium albilapidense is a erect, perennial herbaceous plant that grows 9–24 cm tall. The plant has thin, fibrous roots, about 3 mm thick. Above these grows a tuft of linear-attenuate, upright basal leaves, 4.5–15 cm long by 1–1.5 mm wide. The leaves are smooth (glabrous) and stiff with pointed (acute) tips.

The flowers are borne on an unbranched, upright stem 1.1–1.4 mm wide that rises 6–20 cm from the base. The stem is rigid, with narrow, straight-edged wings. It terminates in a narrow bract, 1.5–8 cm long, that has papery edges at the base. Arising from the stem at the point where the terminal bract connects is a small group of flower clusters, called a fasciculiform synflorescence. This synflorescence consists of 1–3 closely clustered rhipidia—a rhipidium is an alternately branched group of flowers contained between a pair of spathes (small bracts) that is characteristic of the Iridaceae family. In the case of Sisyrinchium albilapidense, each rhipidium begins with a pedicel 1–18 mm long (sometimes almost absent or subsessile) and bears 3–5 flowers. The lower valve of each spathe is 11–14 mm long by 1.6 mm wide and the upper valve is 12–14 mm long by 1.6 mm wide. The shape of the spathe valves is acute to long apiculate and they are glabrous, with a membranaceous (papery) margin for the first 1–1.2 mm. Each flower is borne on a glabrous pedicel 14–18 mm long, which is longer than spathes.

The perigon (the structure formed by the flower's tepals) is disk shaped, and mostly yellow or whitish. The tepals are yellow at the base, followed by a brown or burgundy (vinaceous) ring. Five burgundy-colored veins (three large, two small) extend out from the ring along the yellowish tepals; these are visible from above and below. Fresh flowers are 11–12 mm in diameter. The six tepals are roughly equal in size, 4.5–6 mm long by 2–2.5 mm wide, oblanceolate in shape and apiculate. The lower (abaxial) surface of each tepal bears sparse trichomes (hair-like structures). The stamen filaments are fused into a cylindrical staminal column 2–2.4 mm long. The lowest 0.5–0.7 mm is covered with oil-producing trichomes (elaiophores); above that the trichomes are more sparsely distributed. The staminal column is mostly light yellow but may be burgundy-colored toward the tip. The stamens bear 2–3 mm long yellow anthers that are connected to the filaments at their bases (basifixed). The flower's ovary is glabrous and generally spherical globose, measuring about 1 mm long and wide. Rising above the ovary, the style is 2.5–3 mm long, yellow and unbranched. At the top of the style, projecting above the anthers is the stigmatic region, which receives pollen. Each flower matures to form a smooth, brown fruiting capsule that is globose to subglobose, 1.9–6 mm long by 2.5–6 mm diameter. Flowers and fruits are reported from October to January.

== Taxonomy ==
Sisyrinchium albilapidense was described by the Chilean botanist Pierfelice Ravenna in 2001. Ravenna's description appeared in volume 5, issue 12 of his self-published journal Onira, which had very limited distribution. (Ravenna appears to have inadvertently published two issues numbered 12 in volume 5; this is the latter of the two, dated 20 May 2001.) The species is accepted as a correct name by the global taxonomy resource Plants of the World Online.

Ravenna's description of the species was based on a holotype collected by Carmen Lelia Cristóbal and Antonio Krapovickas on January 17, 1988, at Parque das Pedras Brancas, 10 km southeast of Lages in Santa Caterina state and deposited at the herbarium of the Instituto de Botanica del Nordeste with collector number 42042. The holotype specimen lacked flowers, so these were not described in detail by Ravenna but were later described by Brazilian botanist Camila Dellanhese Inácio based on other collections. The Latin specific epithet "albilapidense" refers to the pale rock outcrop that also is the source for the Portuguese place name Pedras Brancas.

Inácio reviewed the species as part of her treatment of Sisyrinchium section Cephalanthum in her 2017 thesis. According to Inácio S. albilapidense differs from other species in section Cephalanthum by its narrow synflorescence with few rhipidia, the linear bract at top of each stem, and the rigid leaves and stem.

S. albilapidense is similar to several other species in Sisyrinchium section Cephalanthum. Most similar is Sisyrinchium ostenianum, from which it can be distinguished by its narrow and straight terminal bract (vs. a stiff and incurved bract in S. ostenianum) and the sparse trichomes on the upper portion of the staminal column (whereas S. ostenianum has a dense crown of reflexed trichomes just below the anthers). While S. ostenianum has a broad distribution in northern Argentina, Uruguay and southern Brazil, its northern limit is around the Jacuí River in Rio Grande do Sul state, south of S. albilapidense.

Sisyrinchium platycaule and Sisyrinchium sellowianum are morphologically similar species recorded from Santa Catarina state including some sites near Lages, but these can be distinguished by their cream or white flowers, whereas the flowers of from S. albilapidense are yellow.

One sample from S. albilapidense was included in the 2017 study of phylogenetic relationships within the genus Sisyrinchium. 171 samples representing 110 taxa were analyzed for a combination of nine coding and non-coding DNA regions. The resulting maximum likelihood phylogram confirmed that S. albilapidense is well supported as a member of section Cephalanthum and appears to be very closely related to Sisyrinchium sellowianum and Sisyrinchium fiebrigii.

== Distribution ==
Sisyrinchium albilapidense has been recorded only from its type locality at Pedras Brancas, 10 km southeast of Lages, in Santa Catarina state, Brazil. The surrounding habitat is a mix of grassland, forest and rock outcrops, at an elevation of approximately 900 m. This is a type of vegetation characterized as subtropical mixed forest.

== Sources ==
- Inácio, Camila (2017). Classificação infragenérica de Sisyrinchium L. (Iridaceae) e taxonomia das seções Cephalanthum e Viperella (pró parte) na região sul do Brasil [Infrageneric classification of Sisyrinchium L. (Iridaceae) and taxonomy of sections Cephalanthum and Viperella (in part) in the southern region of Brazil] (Thesis). hdl:10183/241254.
- Inácio, Camila Dellanhese; Chauveau, Olivier; Souza-Chies, Tatiana T.; Sauquet, Hervé; Eggers, Lilian (December 2017), "An updated phylogeny and infrageneric classification of the genus Sisyrinchium (Iridaceae): Challenges of molecular and morphological evidence", Taxon, 66 (6): 1317–1348, Bibcode:2017Taxon..66.1317I, doi:10.12705/666.4
- Ravenna, Pierfelice (20 May 2001), "Revisional Studies in the Genus Sisyrinchium (Iridaceae) – VII", Onira, 5 (12): 54–61
- "Sisyrinchium albilapidense Ravenna". International Plant Names Index (IPNI). Royal Botanic Gardens, Kew.
- "Sisyrinchium albilapidense Ravenna". Plants of the World Online. Royal Botanic Gardens, Kew.
