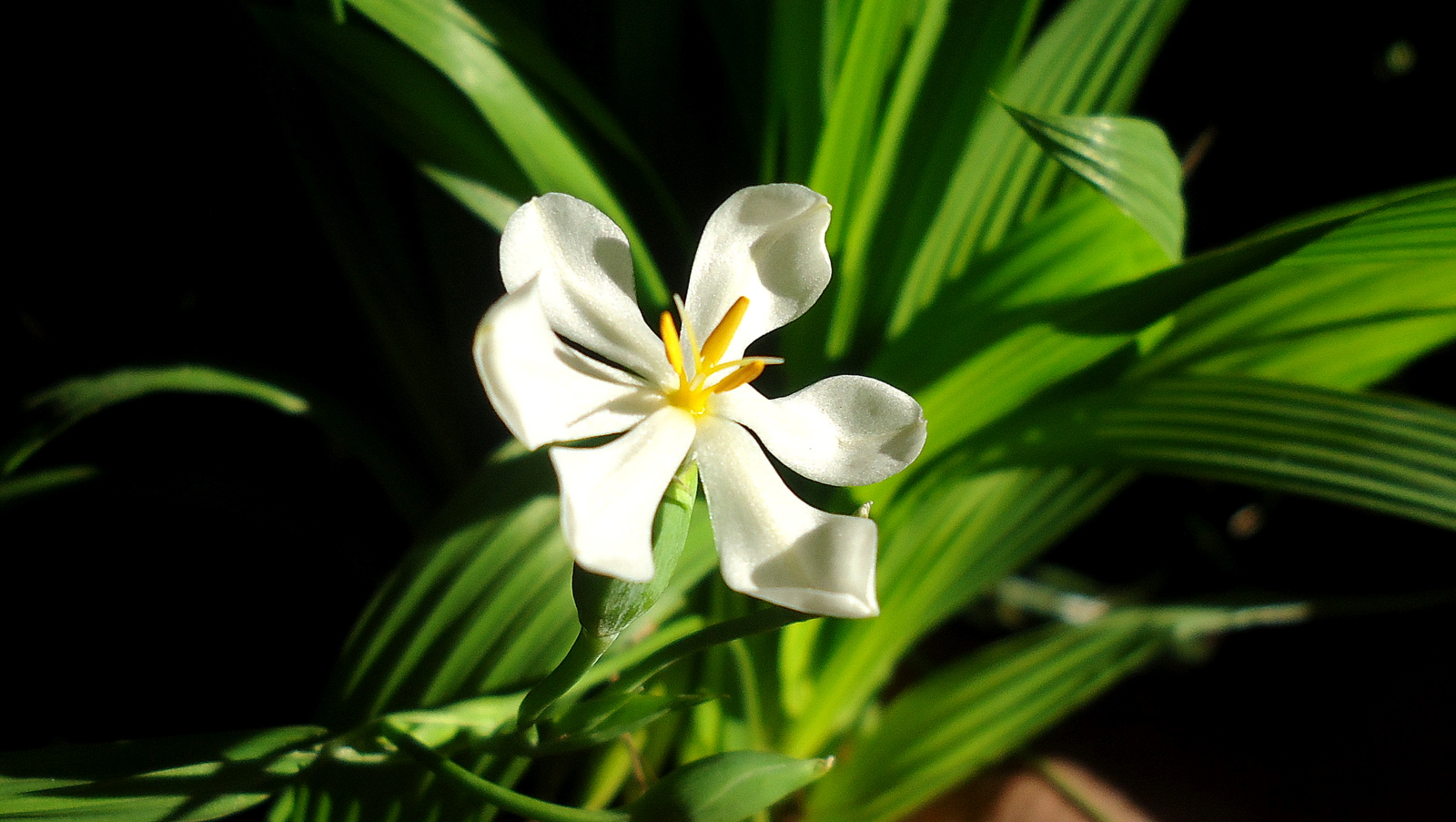

Scientific classification
- Kingdom: Plantae
- Clade: Tracheophytes
- Clade: Angiosperms
- Clade: Monocots
- Order: Asparagales
- Family: Iridaceae
- Genus: Eleutherine
- Species: E. bulbosa

Binomial name
- Eleutherine bulbosa (Mill.) Urb.

Synonyms
- Bermudiana bulbosa (Mill.) Molina; Bermudiana congesta (Klatt) Kuntze; Cipura plicata (Sw.) Griseb.; Eleutherine americana (Aubl.) Merr. ex K.Heyne; Eleutherine anomala Herb.; Eleutherine longifolia Gagnep.; Eleutherine plicata (Sw.) Herb.; Eleutherine plicata Herb. ex Klatt; Eleutherine subaphylla Gagnep.; Ferraria parviflora Salisb.; Galatea americana (Aubl.) Kuntze; Galatea bulbosa (Mill.) Britton; Galatea plicata (Sw.) Baker; Ixia americana Aubl.; Sisyrinchium americanum (Aubl.) Lemée; Sisyrinchium bulbosum Mill.; Sisyrinchium capitatum Pers.; Sisyrinchium congestum Klatt; Sisyrinchium elatum Seub. ex Klatt; Sisyrinchium latifolium Sw.; Sisyrinchium palmifolium var. congestum (Klatt) Baker; Sisyrinchium plicatum (Sw.) Spreng.; Sisyrinchium racemosum Pers.

= Eleutherine bulbosa =

Species of plant

Eleutherine bulbosa is an herbaceous, perennial flowering plant species in the family Iridaceae. Among Spanish-speakers, the plant is known as lagrimas de la virgen ("tears of the virgin").

Like other Eleutherine species, E. bulbosa has a bulbous rootstock; a large subapical cauline leaf; and small, white, stellate, evening-blooming flowers. E. bulbosa grows in southern Mexico and in the Amazon rainforest, within the borders of Peru, Bolivia, Ecuador, Guyana, Suriname, and French Guiana, in addition to the Brazilian states of Amapá and Acre. It is widely cultivated for its medicinal properties.

Like E. latifolia, E. bulbosa has a basic chromosome number of x=6 (2n=12); it also has a similar bimodal karyotype, which is distinctive to this plant tribe (Tigridieae); all other genera of the tribe have x=7. Usually, E. bulbosa has a heteromorphic long chromosome pair, the result of a pericentric inversion in one of the long chromosomes, which makes it sexually sterile.

Rahenna described a subspecies in 1965: E. bulbosa subsp. citriodora.
