= Wilhelm Gustav Franz Herter =

German-Uruguayan botanist and mycologist

Wilhelm Gustav Franz Herter (10 January 1884 in Berlin – 17 April 1958 in Hamburg) was a German-Uruguayan botanist and mycologist.

In 1908, he received his doctorate in Berlin with a dissertation on the genus Lycopodium. From 1923 to 1939, he lived and worked in Uruguay, gaining Uruguayan citizenship in 1925. In Montevideo, he was associated with its botanical garden and museum, and in the meantime taught classes at the university. In 1934, he became director of the Revista Sudamericana de Botánica.

During the Second World War, Herter was Director of the Nazi-publishing series Veröffentlichungen der Staatlichen Botanischen Anstalten des Generalgouvernements.

Known for his work in the fields of systematics and taxonomy, he is credited with identifying more than 200 species new to science. He was a leading expert on the botanical order Lycopodiales. Taxa with the specific epithet of herteri are named in his honor, an example being the mycological species Tulostoma herteri.

== Selected works ==
- "Beiträge zur Kenntnis der Gattung Lycopodium", 1908
- "Plantae Uruguayenses", (with Cornelius Osten), 1925
- "Estudios botanicos en la region Uruguaya", 1927
- "Flora ilustrada del Uruguay", 1939
- "Systema Lycopodiorum" 1950

Herter issued the exsiccata Plantae Uruguayenses exsiccatae.
