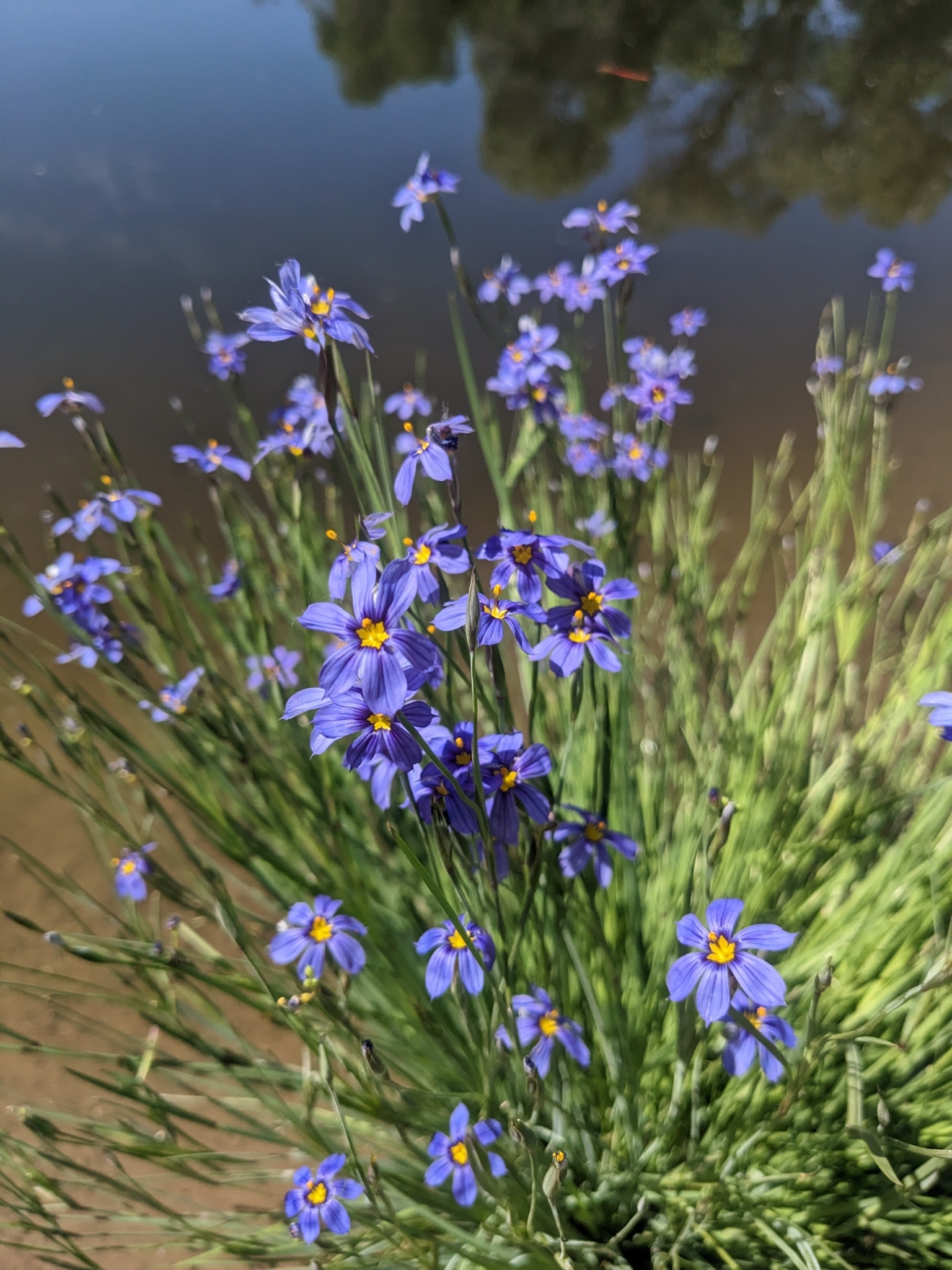
- Sisyrinchium demissum flowering in Sweetwater Wetland Park, Tucson, Arizona

Conservation status
- Secure (NatureServe)

Scientific classification
- Kingdom: Plantae
- Clade: Tracheophytes
- Clade: Angiosperms
- Clade: Monocots
- Order: Asparagales
- Family: Iridaceae
- Genus: Sisyrinchium
- Species: S. demissum

Binomial name
- Sisyrinchium demissum Greene (1890)

Synonyms
- Sisyrinchium amethystinum E.P.Bicknell (1901); Sisyrinchium demissum var. amethystinum (E.P.Bicknell) Kearney & Peebles (1939); Sisyrinchium longipedunculatum E.P.Bicknell (1901)

= Sisyrinchium demissum =

Species of flowering plant in the blue-eyed grass genus

Sisyrinchium demissum, commonly called stiff blue-eyed grass is small member of the iris family in genus Sisyrinchium. The plant's natural range is in the western United states and northern Mexico. It is sometimes grown in garden settings in its native range.

== Description ==
Sisyrinchium demissum is a herbaceous plant that grows as much as 50 centimeters tall. It has a tufted growth pattern that makes it resemble a clump of grass (cespitose). The leaves spring directly from the base of the plant (basal leaves) and are very narrow at just 0.5–5 millimeters in width, but will usually be just short of half the total height of the plant's flowering stems when blooming. The roots are dense and fine to somewhat thickened.

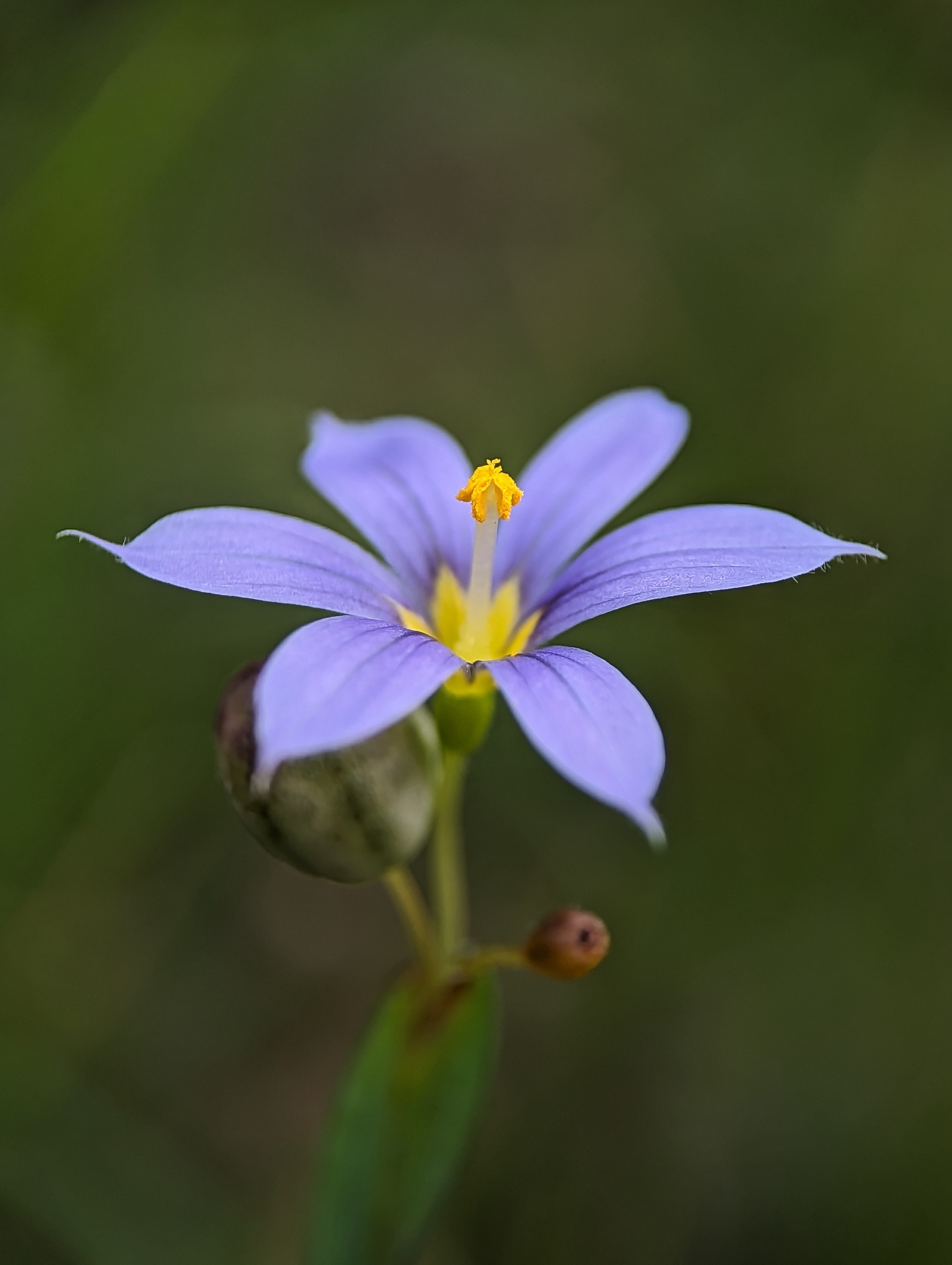
Sisyrinchium demissum flower

The flowers are alone at the end of branched, flattened stems. Each flowering stem will branch once or twice, with the first node 8–34 centimeters up the stem. The two bracts under the flowers are relatively large (spathes), wider than the supporting branch and green in color, without hairs, and taper to a pointed end. The flowers have six tepals, structures that resemble both petals and sepals. They are dark blue-violet with bright yellow bases and have three or five darker veins running their length. The outer tepals are 6–15 millimeters in length. In the center of the flower is a column of three stamens, also yellow. The blooming season is long, from mid spring to early fall.

Following blooming a round, tan to beige capsule forms as the fruit. Each capsule will have a diameter of 4–8 millimeters. Inside there are multiple small round seeds, 0.8–2 millimters in size with either a smooth surface or covered with small rounded protuberances (granular).

== Taxonomy ==
The species was given its first scientific description in 1890 by Edward Lee Greene with its present binomial name of Sisyrinchium demissum. It was described using specimens that Greene collected near Flagstaff, Arizona. It is classified in the iris family, Iridaceae, in the blue-eyed grasses genus, Sisyrinchium.

=== Names ===
The species name, demissum, means humble. In English the species is known by the common name "stiff blue-eyed grass". As with many other species in its genus it is also simply called "blue-eyed grass".

== Range and habitat ==
Sisyrinchium demissum is found in the desert southwest of the United states and in northern Mexico. In the United states it is most common in four states, Arizona, New Mexico, Nevada, and Utah. But it is also found in Colorado and a small area of the farthst west of Texas in the Trans-Pecos region. Most of the observations in Colorado are in the southern part of the state, but it has also been observed in Weld County in the Pawnee National Grassland. In Mexico it is reported from the states of Baja California Sur, Chihuahua, Coahuila, Nuevo León, and Sonora.

Its habitat is in moist areas of the deserts and in higher elevation forest openings. They are found near both seasonal and permanently flowing streams, moist meadows, ciénegas, near springs, and forest seeps. The elevation range for the species is from 500–2900 meters.

== Cultivation ==
Stiff blue-eyed grass is grown in native plant gardens, particularly in places that are moist such as near downspouts. Gardeners will grow it from seed to divide the clumps to propagate plants. They are winter hardy in USDA zones 3–8. The seeds exhibit a large degree of germination inhibition. In a study only 15% of the seeds sprouted after four weeks at 21 °C (70 °F). In contrast, 57% sprouted in the second week when planted at the same temperature with light after first being held at 4.5 °C (40 °F) for three months before planting. No seeds sprouted when planted in dark conditions.
