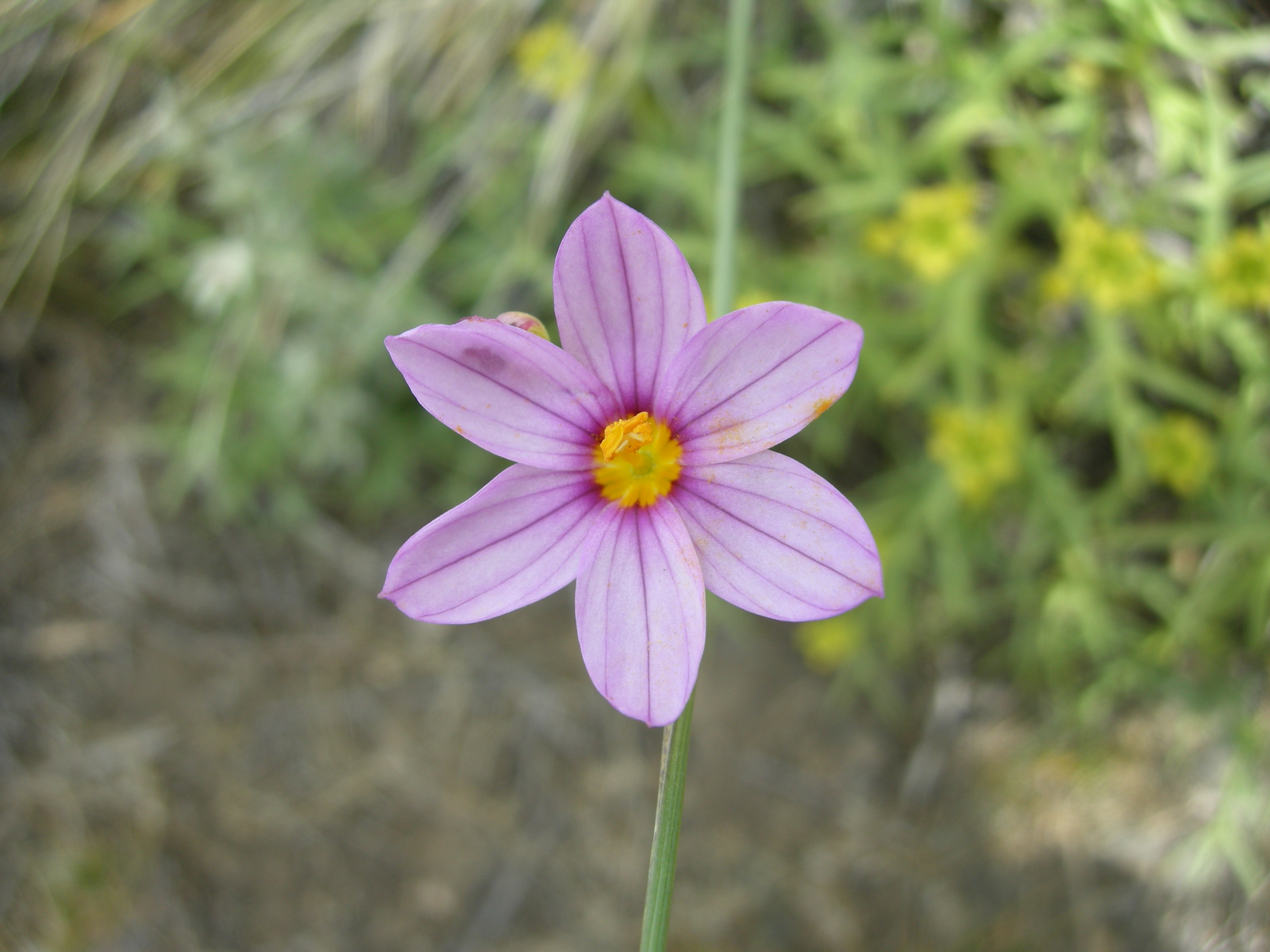

Scientific classification
- Kingdom: Plantae
- Clade: Tracheophytes
- Clade: Angiosperms
- Clade: Monocots
- Order: Asparagales
- Family: Iridaceae
- Genus: Olsynium
- Species: O. junceum

Binomial name
- Olsynium junceum (E.Mey. ex C.Presl) Goldblatt

Synonyms
- List: Bermudiana juncea (E.Mey. ex C.Presl) Kuntze; Olsynium argentinense (Hauman) Ravenna; Olsynium colchaguensis (Phil.) Ravenna; Olsynium eleutherostemon (Phil.) Ravenna; Olsynium midletonii (Baker) Ravenna; Sisyrinchium argentinense Hauman; Sisyrinchium colchaguense Phil.; Sisyrinchium depauperatum Phil.; Sisyrinchium eleutherostemon Phil.; Sisyrinchium junceum E.Mey. ex C.Presl; Sisyrinchium juncifolium Herb. [Spelling variant]; Sisyrinchium junciforme Poepp.; Sisyrinchium midletonii Baker; Sisyrinchium pauciflorum Phil.; Sisyrinchium roseum Herb.; Sisyrinchium weberbauerianum Kraenzl.

= Olsynium junceum =

Species of flowering plant

Olsynium junceum is a species of the iris family, native to South America (Bolivia, Peru, Argentina, Chile).

Subspecies

1. Olsynium junceum subsp. colchaguense (Phil.) J.M.Watson & A.R.Flores - central Chile
2. Olsynium junceum subsp. depauperatum (Phil.) R.A.Rodr. & Martic - southern Chile
3. Olsynium junceum subsp. junceum - Bolivia, Peru, Argentina, northern + central Chile
