= Cornelius Osten =

German businessman and botanist (1863–1936)

Cornelius Osten (11 February 1863, in Bremen – 6 September 1936, in Montevideo) was a German businessman and botanist known for his investigations of Uruguayan flora. He specialized in studies of the botanical family Cyperaceae (sedges).

In 1896 he emigrated to Uruguay, where he worked with José Arechavaleta, director of the natural history museum in Montevideo. In 1934 he was awarded with an honorary doctorate from the University of Göttingen. His herbarium of 23,000 items was bequeathed to the natural history museum in Montevideo.

The plant genus Ostenia (family Alismataceae) was named in his honor by Franz Georg Philipp Buchenau.

== Selected works ==
- "Plantae Uruguayenses. 1 Pteridophyta", 1925 (with Wilhelm Gustav Franz Herter) – On Pteridophyta of Uruguay.
- Las ciperáceas del Uruguay, 1931 – Cyperaceae native to Uruguay.
- Sobre el descubrimiento de una Gunnera en el pais, 1933 (with Wilhelm Gustav Franz Herter) – On the discovery of Gunnera in the country.
- Notas sobre cactáceas – Notes on Cactaceae.
