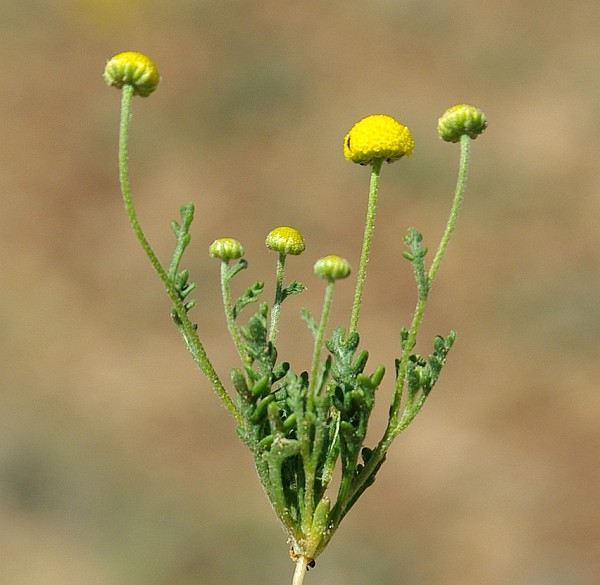
- Cancrinia discoidea

Scientific classification
- Kingdom: Plantae
- Clade: Tracheophytes
- Clade: Angiosperms
- Clade: Eudicots
- Clade: Asterids
- Order: Asterales
- Family: Asteraceae
- Subfamily: Asteroideae
- Tribe: Anthemideae
- Genus: Cancrinia; Kar. & Kir.

Type species
- Cancrinia chrysocephala Kar. & Kir.

= Cancrinia =

Genus of flowering plants

Cancrinia is a genus of flowering plants in the aster family, Asteraceae. They are native to central Asia, where they are distributed in China, Mongolia, and Russia.

These are compact, woolly-haired perennial herbs and subshrubs. The leaves are alternately arranged or clustered, sometimes densely. Flower heads are solitary at the tips of the stems or arranged in inflorescences. The hemispherical or cup-shaped head is lined with 3 or 4 rows of phyllaries that sometimes have dark margins. It contains tubular yellow disc florets. The fruit is an achene tipped with lance-shaped scales like a pappus.

Cancrinia discoidea is used as a medicinal remedy for inflammation and other conditions.

Species

- Cancrinia angrenica - Tajikistan
- Cancrinia chrysocephala - Altay, Kazakhstan, Xinjiang
- Cancrinia discoidea - Altay, Irkutsk, Uzbekistan, Kazakhstan, Tibet, Gansu, Xingiang, Mongolia
- Cancrinia karataviensis - Kazakhstan, Tajikistan, Kyrgyzstan
- Cancrinia krasnoborovii - Siberia
- Cancrinia lasiocarpa - Gansu, Mongolia, Ningxia
- Cancrinia litwinowii - Xinjiang
- Cancrinia maximowiczi - Gansu, Xingiang, Mongolia, Qinghai
- Cancrinia pamirica - Tajikistan
- Cancrinia rupestris - Turkmenistan
- Cancrinia tianschanica - Altay, Kazakhstan, Xinjiang, Uzbekistan, Kyrgyzstan
- Cancrinia tripinnatifida - West Himalaya
