= Hispidulin =

Names
- IUPAC name 4′,5,7-Trihydroxy-6-methoxyflavone
- Systematic IUPAC name 5,7-Dihydroxy-2-(4-hydroxyphenyl)-6-methoxy-4H-1-benzopyran-4-one

Identifiers
CAS Number	1447-88-7
3D model (JSmol)	Interactive image
ChEBI	CHEBI:75902
ChemSpider	4444947
ECHA InfoCard	100.229.713
EC Number	802-856-8
KEGG	C10058
PubChem CID	5281628
UNII	N7F61604C2
CompTox Dashboard (EPA)	DTXSID30162786
- InChI: InChI=1S/C16H12O6/c1-21-16-11(19)7-13-14(15(16)20)10(18)6-12(22-13)8-2-4-9(17)5-3-8/h2-7,17,19-20H,1H3 Key: IHFBPDAQLQOCBX-UHFFFAOYSA-N; InChI=1/C16H12O6/c1-21-16-11(19)7-13-14(15(16)20)10(18)6-12(22-13)8-2-4-9(17)5-3-8/h2-7,17,19-20H,1H3 Key: IHFBPDAQLQOCBX-UHFFFAOYAV
- SMILES: COc1c(O)cc2oc(cc(=O)c2c1O)-c1ccc(O)cc1

Properties
Chemical formula	C_{16}H_{12}O_{6}
- Except where otherwise noted, data are given for materials in their standard state (at 25 °C [77 °F], 100 kPa). Infobox references

Hispidulin is a naturally occurring flavone with potential antiepileptic activity in rats and gerbils. It is found in plants including Grindelia argentina, Arrabidaea chica, Saussurea involucrate, Crossostephium chinense, Artemisia, and Salvia.

== Complementary medicine ==
In traditional and complementary medicine it is claimed to have "antioxidant, antifungal, anti-inflammatory, antimutagenic, and antineoplastic properties".
