= Allium oliganthum =

Scientific classification
- Kingdom: Plantae
- Clade: Tracheophytes
- Clade: Angiosperms
- Clade: Monocots
- Order: Asparagales
- Family: Amaryllidaceae
- Subfamily: Allioideae
- Genus: Allium
- Species: A. oliganthum

Binomial name
- Allium oliganthum Kar. & Kir.

Synonyms
- Allium stenophyllum Schrenk

Species of plant

Allium oliganthum is a plant species in the Amaryllis family found from Siberia to North-West China. It is also known as the Kazakh leek, and it is grown as an ornamental plant.
