= Vogtia =

Vogtia may refer to:

- 1439 Vogtia, a minor planet
- Vogtia (cnidarian), a genus of cnidarians in the family Hippopodiidae
- Vogtia, a genus of moths in the family Pyralidae, synonym of Arcola
- Vogtia (plant), a genus of flowering plants in family Asteraceae
