= Allium sabulosum =

Лук песчаный 沙地薤 sha di xie

Scientific classification
- Kingdom: Plantae
- Clade: Tracheophytes
- Clade: Angiosperms
- Clade: Monocots
- Order: Asparagales
- Family: Amaryllidaceae
- Subfamily: Allioideae
- Genus: Allium
- Subgenus: A. subg. Allium
- Species: A. sabulosum

Binomial name
- Allium sabulosum Steven ex Bunge

Synonyms
- Allium lessingii Kar. ex Ledeb.; Allium sabulosum var. inaequale Regel

Species of flowering plant

Allium sabulosum is a Eurasian species of wild onion native to European Russia, Kazakhstan, Kyrgyzstan, Iran, Tajikistan, Turkmenistan, Uzbekistan and Xinjiang.

Allium sabulosum produces one egg-shaped bulb up to 20 mm in diameter. Scape is up to 60 cm tall. Leaves are tubular, shorter than the scape. Umbel is densely packed with many green flowers.
