= Coleophora mausoleae =

Scientific classification
- Kingdom: Animalia
- Phylum: Arthropoda
- Class: Insecta
- Order: Lepidoptera
- Family: Coleophoridae
- Genus: Coleophora
- Species: C. mausoleae

Binomial name
- Coleophora mausoleae (Reznik, 1978)

Synonyms
- Multicoloria mausoleae Reznik, 1978

Species of moth

Coleophora mausoleae is a moth of the family Coleophoridae. It is found in Uzbekistan.

The larvae feed on Mausolea eriocarpa. They feed on the leaves of their host plant.
