= Cyperus soongoricus =

Scientific classification
- Kingdom: Plantae
- Clade: Tracheophytes
- Clade: Angiosperms
- Clade: Monocots
- Clade: Commelinids
- Order: Poales
- Family: Cyperaceae
- Genus: Cyperus
- Species: C. soongoricus

Binomial name
- Cyperus soongoricus Kar. & Kir., 1841

Species of sedge

Cyperus soongoricus is a species of sedge that is native to eastern parts of Kazakhstan.

== See also ==
- List of Cyperus species
