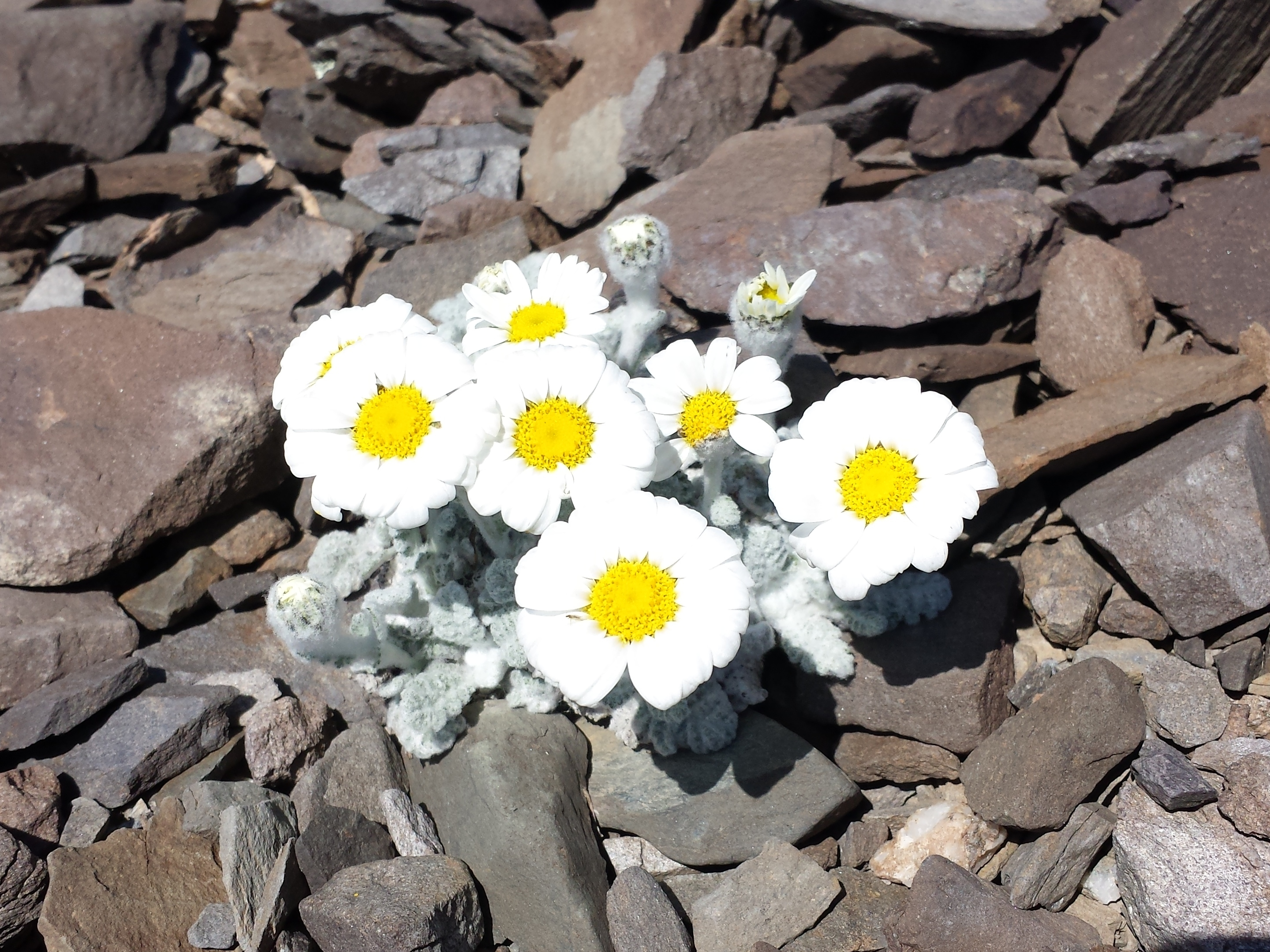
- Richteria in bloom

Scientific classification
- Kingdom: Plantae
- Clade: Embryophytes
- Clade: Tracheophytes
- Clade: Angiosperms
- Clade: Eudicots
- Clade: Asterids
- Order: Asterales
- Family: Asteraceae
- Subfamily: Asteroideae
- Tribe: Anthemideae
- Genus: Richteria; Kar. & Kir.

Type species
- Richteria pyrethroides Kar. & Kir.

= Richteria =

Genus of flowering plants

Richteria is a genus of Asian flowering plants in the daisy family. Described in 1842, the genus is named after botanist Alexander Richter.

Species

- Richteria djilgense (Franch.) K.Bremer & Humphries - Afghanistan
- Richteria leontopodium Winkl. - Kyrgyzstan, Xinjiang, Kazakhstan, Uzbekistan, Siberia
- Richteria pyrethroides Kar. & Kir. - Afghanistan
