= Hippolytia =

Scientific classification
- Kingdom: Plantae
- Clade: Tracheophytes
- Clade: Angiosperms
- Clade: Eudicots
- Clade: Asterids
- Order: Asterales
- Family: Asteraceae
- Subfamily: Asteroideae
- Tribe: Anthemideae
- Genus: Hippolytia; Poljakov

Type species
- Hippolytia darvasica (C.Winkl.) Poljakov

Synonyms
- Tanacetum sect. Hippolytia (Poljakov) Podlech

Genus of flowering plants

Hippolytia is a genus of flowering plants in the daisy family native to temperate Asia.

Species

- Hippolytia alashanensis (Ling) C.Shih - Gansu, Inner Mongolia
- Hippolytia crassicollum (Rech.f.) K.Bremer & Humphries - Afghanistan
- Hippolytia delavayi (Franch. ex W.W.Sm.) C.Shih - Sichuan, Yunnan
- Hippolytia desmantha C.Shih - Qinghai
- Hippolytia dolichophylla (Kitam.) K.Bremer & Humphries - Sichuan
- Hippolytia glomerata C.Shih - Tibet
- Hippolytia gossypina (C.B.Clarke) C.Shih Tibet, Nepal, Sikkim
- Hippolytia herderi (Regel & Schmalh.) Poljakov - Altay, Kazakhstan, Kyrgyzstan, Uzbekistan, Tajikistan, Xinjiang
- Hippolytia kennedyi (Dunn) Ling - Tibet
- Hippolytia megacephala (Rupr.) Poljakov - Kazakhstan, Kyrgyzstan, Uzbekistan
- Hippolytia schugnanica (C.Winkl.) Poljakov - Kazakhstan, Kyrgyzstan, Uzbekistan, Afghanistan, Iran
- Hippolytia senecionis (Jacquem. ex Besser) Poljakov ex Tzvelev - Afghanistan, Kashmir, Tibet
- Hippolytia syncalathiformis C.Shih - Tibet
- Hippolytia tomentosa (DC.) Tzvelev - Kashmir, Tibet
- Hippolytia trifida (Turcz.) Poljakov - Mongolia, Inner Mongolia
- Hippolytia yunnanensis (Jeffrey) C.Shih - Yunnan, Myanmar
