= Heliocauta =

Scientific classification
- Kingdom: Plantae
- Clade: Tracheophytes
- Clade: Angiosperms
- Clade: Eudicots
- Clade: Asterids
- Order: Asterales
- Family: Asteraceae
- Subfamily: Asteroideae
- Tribe: Anthemideae
- Genus: Heliocauta; Humphries
- Species: H. atlantica

Binomial name
- Heliocauta atlantica (Litard. & Maire) Humphries

Synonyms
- Anacyclus atlanticus Litard. & Maire; Heliocauta atlantica var. dasyphylla Humphries; Anacyclus atlanticus var. vestitus Humbert; Anacyclus atlanticus subsp. vestitus (Humbert) Emb.

Genus of flowering plants

Heliocauta is a genus of flowering plants in the daisy family. There is only one known species, Heliocauta atlantica, native to Morocco.
