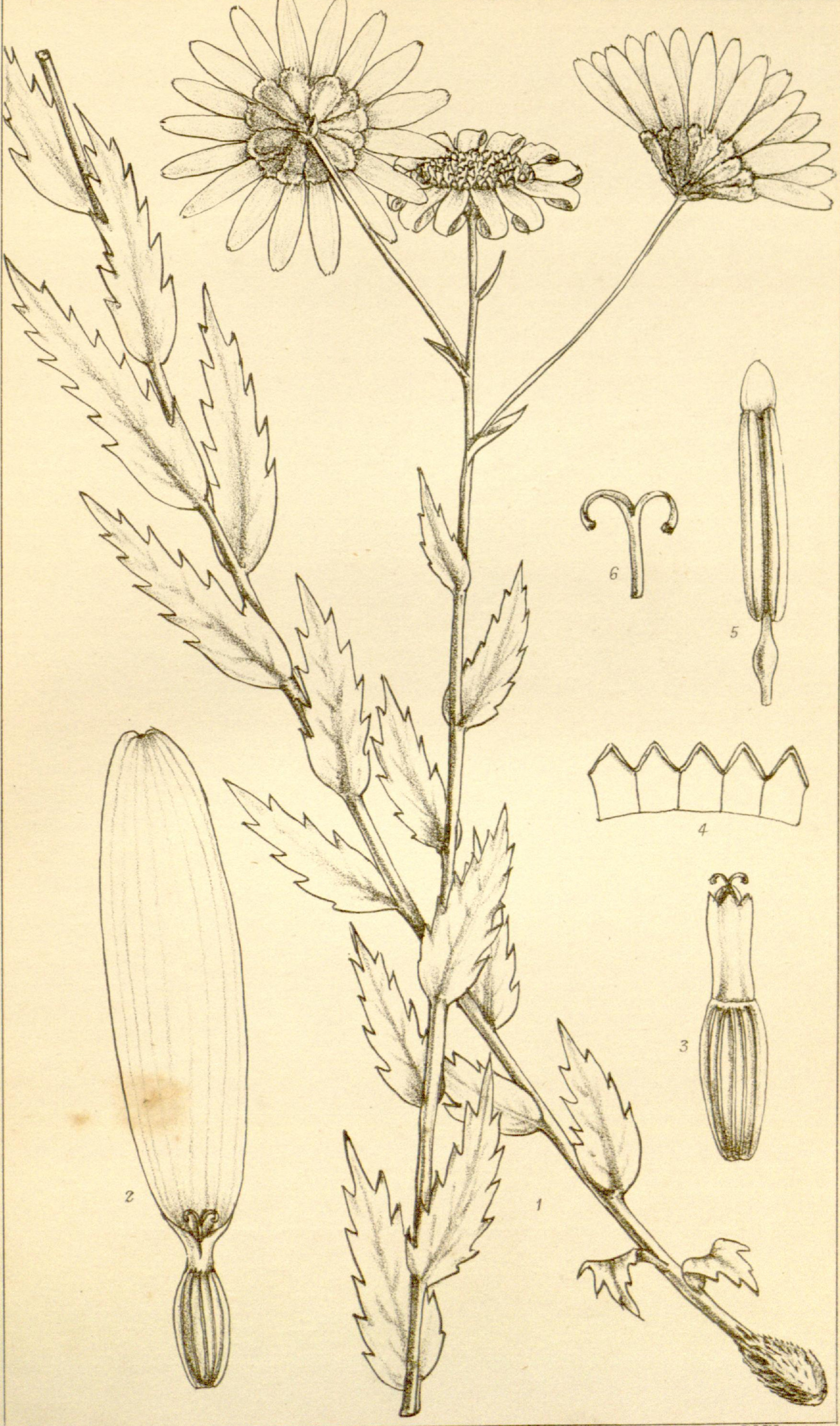
- Illustration accompanying the protologue of Chrysanthemum osmitoides, the basionym of Adenanthellum osmitoides.

Scientific classification
- Kingdom: Plantae
- Clade: Tracheophytes
- Clade: Angiosperms
- Clade: Eudicots
- Clade: Asterids
- Order: Asterales
- Family: Asteraceae
- Subfamily: Asteroideae
- Tribe: Anthemideae
- Genus: Adenanthellum; B.Nord.
- Species: A. osmitoides

Binomial name
- Adenanthellum osmitoides (Harv.) B.Nord.

Synonyms
- Adenanthemum osmitoides (Harv.) B.Nord. (1976); Chrysanthemum osmitoides Harv. (1863)

= Adenanthellum =

Genus of flowering plants

Adenanthellum is a genus of flowering plants in the daisy family, Asteraceae, described as a genus in 1979.

There is only one known species, Adenanthellum osmitoides, native to the Northern Provinces and KwaZulu-Natal in South Africa and to Eswatini.
