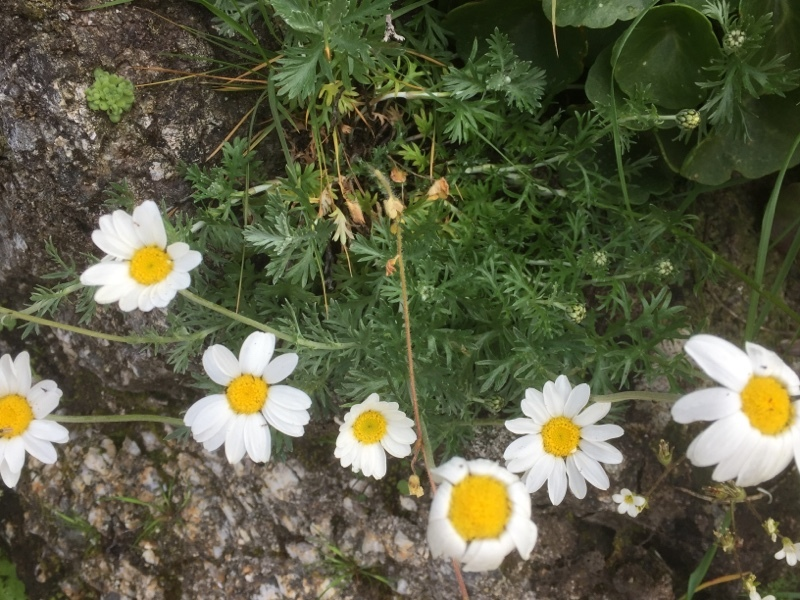
- Phalacrocarpum oppositifolium

Scientific classification
- Kingdom: Plantae
- Clade: Embryophytes
- Clade: Tracheophytes
- Clade: Spermatophytes
- Clade: Angiosperms
- Clade: Eudicots
- Clade: Asterids
- Order: Asterales
- Family: Asteraceae
- Subfamily: Asteroideae
- Tribe: Anthemideae
- Genus: Phalacrocarpum ( DC.) Willk.

Type species
- Phalacrocarpum oppositifolium (Brot.) Willk.

Synonyms
- Leucanthemum sect. Phalacrocarpum DC.

= Phalacrocarpum =

Genus of flowering plants

Phalacrocarpum is a genus of plants in the chamomile tribe within the daisy family, native to the Iberian Peninsula.

Species

- Phalacrocarpum oppositifolium (Brot.) Willk. - Spain, Portugal
- Phalacrocarpum sericeum Henriq. - Spain, Portugal
- Phalacrocarpum victoriae Sennen & Elias - Spain
