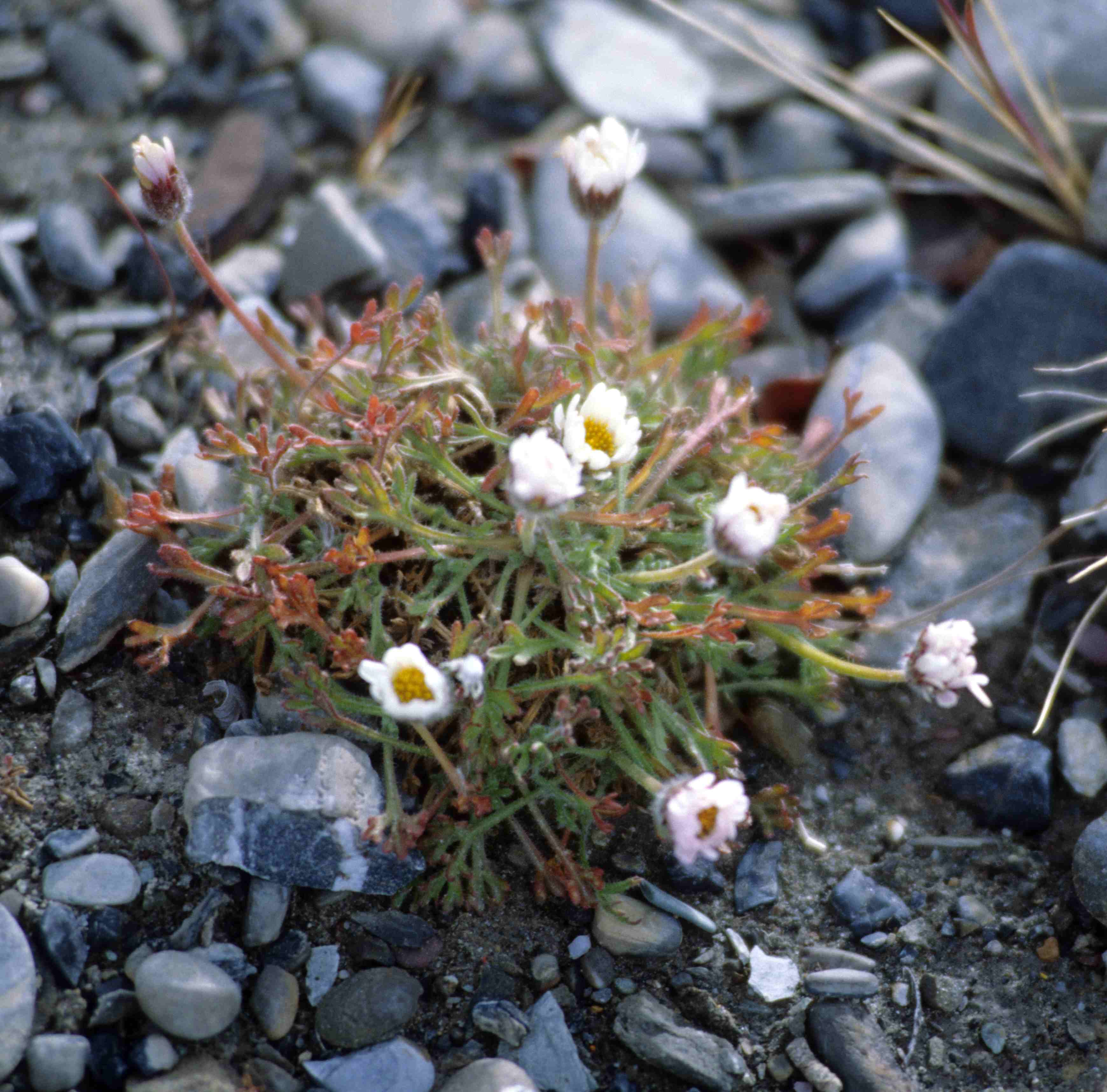
- Quttinirpaaq National Park, Nunavut

Scientific classification
- Kingdom: Plantae
- Clade: Tracheophytes
- Clade: Angiosperms
- Clade: Eudicots
- Clade: Asterids
- Order: Asterales
- Family: Asteraceae
- Genus: Arctanthemum
- Species: A. integrifolium

Binomial name
- Arctanthemum integrifolium (Richardson) Tzvelev 1985

Synonyms
- Chrysanthemum integrifolium Richardson 1823; Dendranthema integrifolium (Richardson) Tzvelev; Hulteniella integrifolia (Richardson) Tzvelev; Leucanthemum integrifolium (Richardson) DC.

= Arctanthemum integrifolium =

Species of flowering plant

Arctanthemum integrifolium, the entire-leaved daisy, is a subarctic species of plant in the sunflower family. It grows in Alaska, northern Canada, Peary Land in northern Greenland, and the East Chukotka region of eastern Russia.

== Description ==
Arctanthemum integrifolium is a perennial herb, rarely more than 12 cm (4.7 in) tall, with a woody underground caudex and a basal rosette of leaves. Each plant usually produces only one flower head, blooming in the summer, containing 11–19 white ray flowers surrounding 60–80 yellow disc flowers.

== Distribution and habitat ==
This plant grows in alpine zones, found most typically on gravelly sites, arctic tundra, and exposed areas with low organic content, such as rock, sand, or gravel. It does not thrive in areas near the sea or where otherwise exposed to salt spray.
