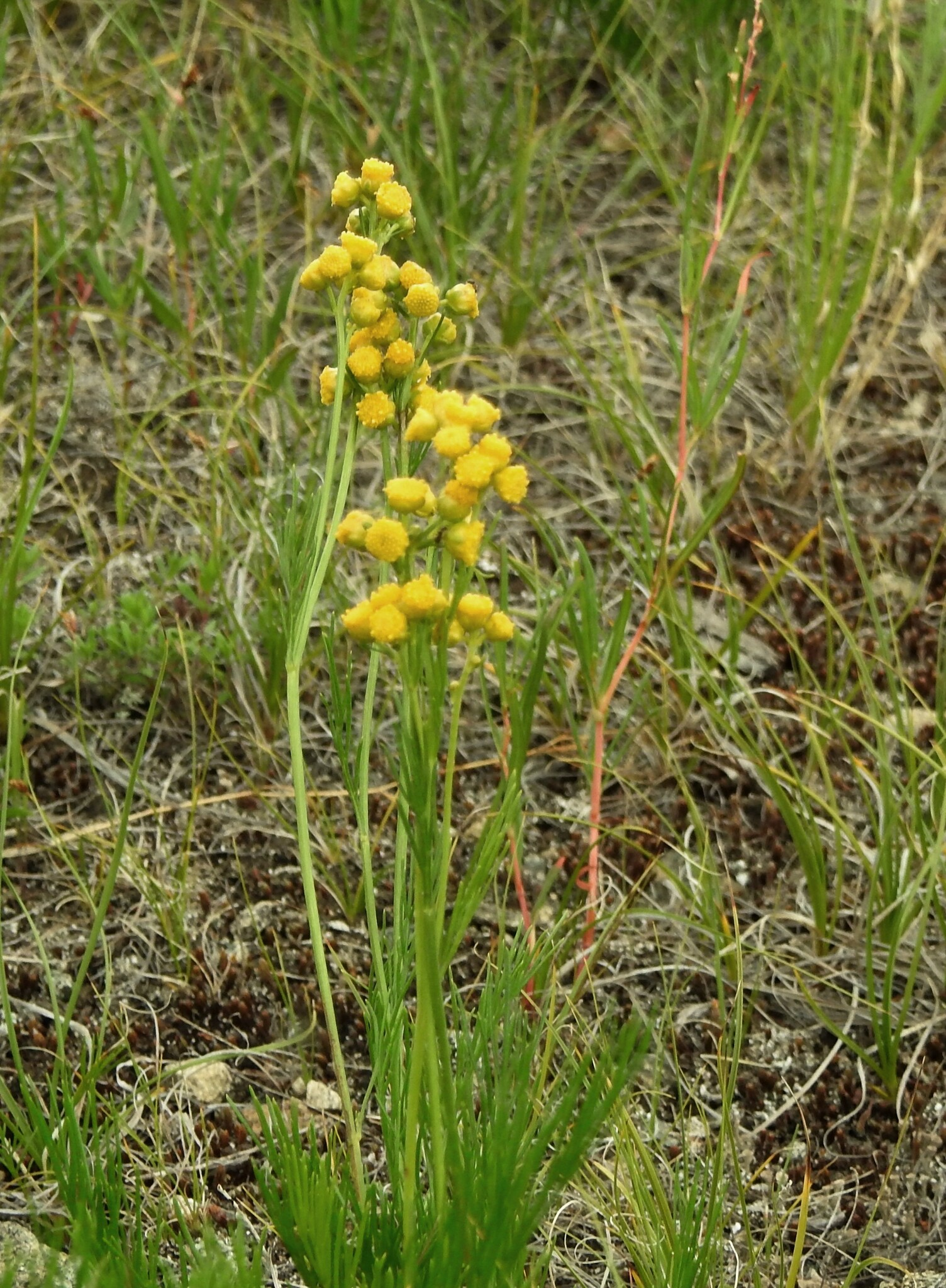

Scientific classification
- Kingdom: Plantae
- Clade: Tracheophytes
- Clade: Angiosperms
- Clade: Eudicots
- Clade: Asterids
- Order: Asterales
- Family: Asteraceae
- Subfamily: Asteroideae
- Tribe: Anthemideae
- Genus: Filifolium; Kitam.
- Species: F. sibiricum

Binomial name
- Filifolium sibiricum (L.) Kitam.

Synonyms
- Chrysanthemum trinioides Hand.-Mazz.; Artemisia sibirica (L.) Maxim.; Tanacetum sibiricum L.

= Filifolium =

Genus of flowering plants

Filifolium is a genus of flowering plants in the daisy family.

There is only one known species, Filifolium sibiricum, native to Japan, Korea, Mongolia, China (Manchuria, Inner Mongolia, Hebei, Shanxi) and parts of Asiatic Russia (Primorye, Amur, Khabarovsk, Irkutsk, Zabaykalsky Krai, Buryatiya).
