= Cancriniella =

Scientific classification
- Kingdom: Plantae
- Clade: Tracheophytes
- Clade: Angiosperms
- Clade: Eudicots
- Clade: Asterids
- Order: Asterales
- Family: Asteraceae
- Subfamily: Asteroideae
- Tribe: Anthemideae
- Genus: Cancriniella; Tzvelev
- Species: C. krascheninnikovii

Binomial name
- Cancriniella krascheninnikovii (Rubtzov) Tzvelev

Synonyms
- Brachanthemum krascheninnikovii Rubtzov; Cancrinia krascheninnikovii (Rubtzov) Poljakov

Genus of flowering plants

Cancriniella is a monotypic genus of flowering plants in the aster family, Asteraceae. It contains only one known species Cancriniella krascheninnikovii, endemic to Kazakhstan.
