= Sclerorhachis =

Scientific classification
- Kingdom: Plantae
- Clade: Tracheophytes
- Clade: Angiosperms
- Clade: Eudicots
- Clade: Asterids
- Order: Asterales
- Family: Asteraceae
- Subfamily: Asteroideae
- Tribe: Anthemideae
- Genus: Sclerorhachis (Rech.f.) Rech.f.

Type species
- Sclerorhachis caulescens (Aitch. & Hemsl.) Rech.f.

Synonyms
- Anthemis section Sclerorhachis Rech.f.

Genus of plants

Sclerorhachis is a genus of Asian plants in the chamomile tribe within the daisy family.

Species

- Sclerorhachis caulescens (Aitch. & Hemsl.) Rech.f. - Afghanistan
- Sclerorhachis kjurendaghi (Kurbanov) Kovalevsk.
- Sclerorhachis leptoclada Rech.f. - Iran
- Sclerorhachis paropamisica (Krasch.) Kovalevsk.
- Sclerorhachis platyrachis (Boiss.) Podlech ex Rech.f. - Iran
- Sclerorhachis polysphaera Rech.f. - Afghanistan
- Sclerorhachis rechingeri Iranshahr - Iran
