= Myxopappus =

Scientific classification
- Kingdom: Plantae
- Clade: Embryophytes
- Clade: Tracheophytes
- Clade: Angiosperms
- Clade: Eudicots
- Clade: Asterids
- Order: Asterales
- Family: Asteraceae
- Subfamily: Asteroideae
- Tribe: Anthemideae
- Genus: Myxopappus; Källersjö

Type species
- Myxopappus acutilobus (DC.) Källersjö

Genus of flowering plants

Myxopappus is a genus of southern African flowering plants in the chamomile tribe within the daisy family. It is native to Namibia and the Cape Provinces of South Africa.

Species

- Myxopappus acutilobus (DC.) Källersjö - Namibia and the Cape Provinces
- Myxopappus hereroensis (O.Hoffm.) Källersjö - Namibia
