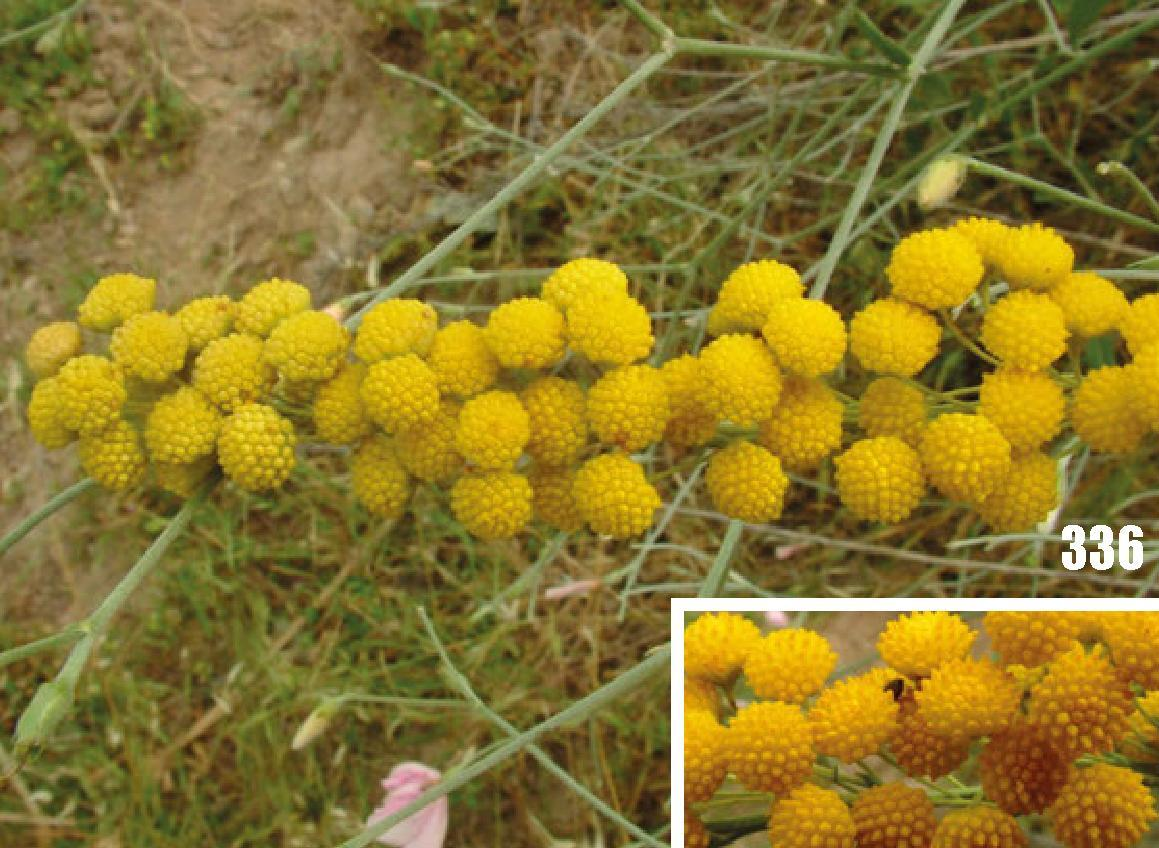
- Lepidolopsis turkestanica

Scientific classification
- Kingdom: Plantae
- Clade: Tracheophytes
- Clade: Angiosperms
- Clade: Eudicots
- Clade: Asterids
- Order: Asterales
- Family: Asteraceae
- Subfamily: Asteroideae
- Tribe: Anthemideae
- Genus: Lepidolopsis; Poljakov

Species
- See text.

Synonyms
- Polychrysum (Tzvelev) Kovalevsk.

= Lepidolopsis =

Genus of flowering plants

Lepidolopsis is a genus of flowering plants in the daisy family. Its species are native to Central Asia (Kazakhstan, Kyrgyzstan, Tajikistan, Turkmenistan, and Uzbekistan) and Afghanistan. The plant has bright yellow flowers that come from a green stem.

== Species ==
As of May 2024, Plants of the World Online accepted three species:

- Lepidolopsis pseudoachillea (C.Winkl.) Poljakov
- Lepidolopsis tadshikorum (Kudr.) Poljakov
- Lepidolopsis turkestanica (Regel & Schmalh.) Poljakov
