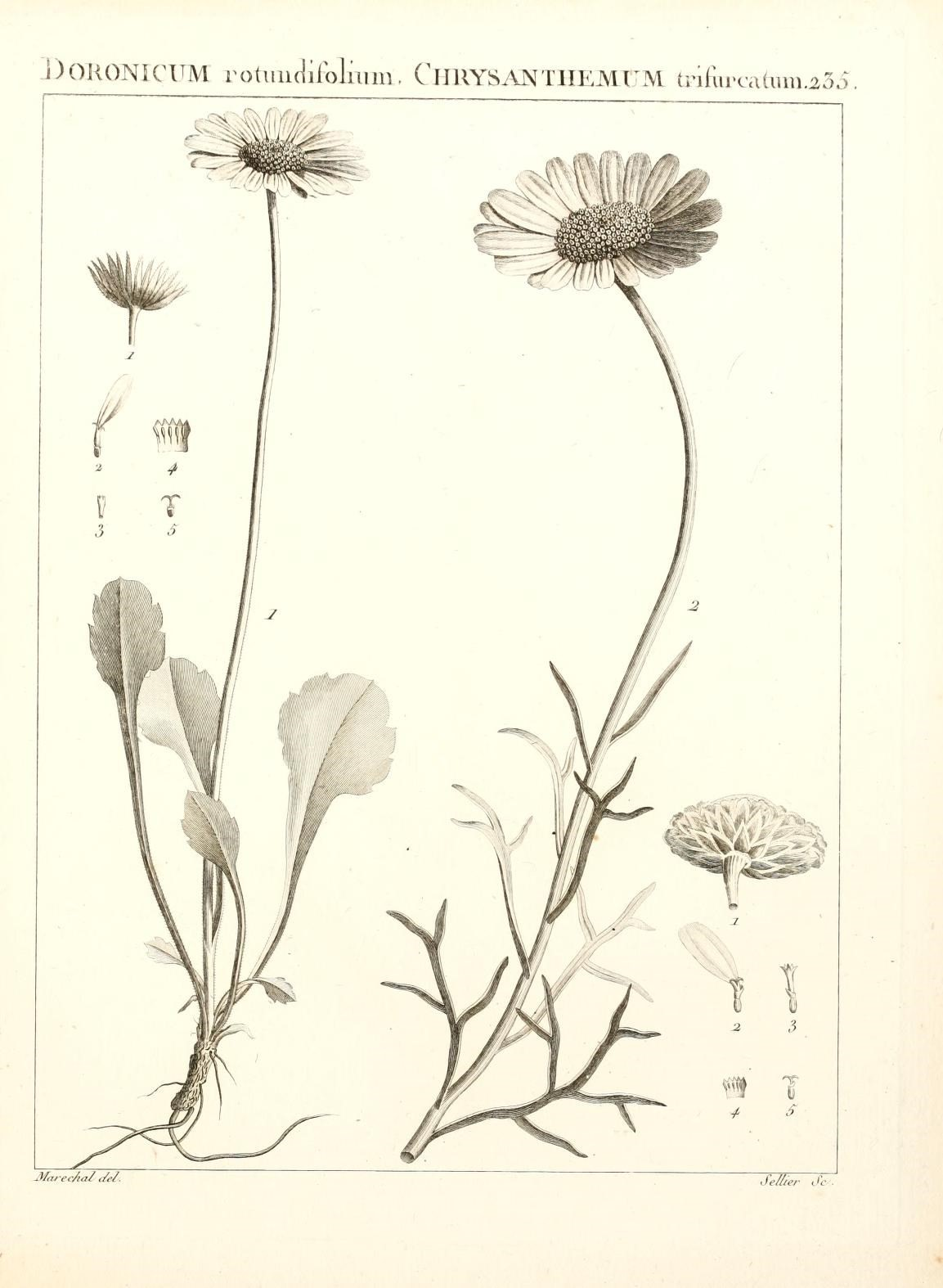

Scientific classification
- Kingdom: Plantae
- Clade: Tracheophytes
- Clade: Angiosperms
- Clade: Eudicots
- Clade: Asterids
- Order: Asterales
- Family: Asteraceae
- Subfamily: Asteroideae
- Tribe: Anthemideae
- Genus: Chrysanthoglossum; B.H.Wilcox, K.Bremer & Humphries

= Chrysanthoglossum =

Genus of flowering plants

Chrysanthoglossum is a genus of flowering plants belonging to the family Asteraceae.

Its native range is Northern Africa.

Species:

- Chrysanthoglossum deserticola (Murb.) B.H.Wilcox, K.Bremer & Humphries
- Chrysanthoglossum trifurcatum (Desf.) B.H.Wilcox, K.Bremer & Humphries
