= Lidbeckia =

Scientific classification
- Kingdom: Plantae
- Clade: Tracheophytes
- Clade: Angiosperms
- Clade: Eudicots
- Clade: Asterids
- Order: Asterales
- Family: Asteraceae
- Subfamily: Asteroideae
- Tribe: Anthemideae
- Genus: Lidbeckia; P.J.Bergius

Type species
- Lidbeckia pectinata P.J.Bergius

Genus of flowering plants

Lidbeckia is a genus of South African flowering plants in the chamomile tribe, within the daisy family. It includes three species endemic to the Cape Provinces of South Africa.

The genus is named in honour of Eric Gustavius Lidbeck (1724–1803), formerly Professor of Botany at Lund, Sweden.

Species

- Lidbeckia lobata Thunb.
- Lidbeckia pectinata P.J.Bergius
- Lidbeckia pinnata J.C.Manning & Helme
