= Tanacetopsis =

Scientific classification
- Kingdom: Plantae
- Clade: Tracheophytes
- Clade: Angiosperms
- Clade: Eudicots
- Clade: Asterids
- Order: Asterales
- Family: Asteraceae
- Subfamily: Asteroideae
- Tribe: Anthemideae
- Genus: Tanacetopsis (Tzvelev) Kovalevsk.

Genus of flowering plants

Tanacetopsis is a genus of flowering plants belonging to the family Asteraceae.

Its native range stretches from Afghanistan to Central Asia (Kazakhstan, Kirghistan, Tajikistan, Turkmenistan and Uzbekistan) to parts of tropical Asia (Western Himalaya and Pakistan).

It was first published in Fl. Uzbekistan. vol.6 on page 138 in 1962.

== Species ==
As accepted by Plants of the World Online;

- Tanacetopsis afghanica (Gilli) K.Bremer & Humphries
- Tanacetopsis botschantzevii (Kovalevsk.) Kovalevsk.
- Tanacetopsis czukavinae Kovalevsk. & Junussov
- Tanacetopsis doabensis (Podlech) Kovalevsk.
- Tanacetopsis eriobasis (Rech.f.) Kovalevsk.
- Tanacetopsis ferganensis (Kovalevsk.) Kovalevsk.
- Tanacetopsis freitagii (Podlech) Kovalevsk.
- Tanacetopsis goloskokovii (Poljakov) Karmysch.
- Tanacetopsis handeliiformis Kovalevsk.
- Tanacetopsis hedgei (Podlech) Kovalevsk.
- Tanacetopsis kamelinii Kovalevsk.
- Tanacetopsis karataviensis (Kovalevsk.) Kovalevsk.
- Tanacetopsis korovinii Kovalevsk.
- Tanacetopsis krascheninnikovii (Nevski) Kovalevsk.
- Tanacetopsis mucronata (Regel & Schmalh.) Kovalevsk.
- Tanacetopsis pamiralaica (Kovalevsk.) Kovalevsk.
- Tanacetopsis pjataevae (Kovalevsk.) Karmysch.
- Tanacetopsis popovii Kamelin & Kovalevsk.
- Tanacetopsis santoana (Krasch., Popov & Vved.) Kovalevsk.
- Tanacetopsis setacea (Regel & Schmalh.) Kovalevsk.
- Tanacetopsis submarginata (Kovalevsk.) Kovalevsk.
- Tanacetopsis subsimilis (Rech.f.) Kovalevsk.
- Tanacetopsis tripinnatifida (Oliv.) Kovalevsk.
- Tanacetopsis urgutensis (Popov ex Tzvelev) Kovalevsk.
