= Marasmodes =

Scientific classification
- Kingdom: Plantae
- Clade: Embryophytes
- Clade: Tracheophytes
- Clade: Angiosperms
- Clade: Eudicots
- Clade: Asterids
- Order: Asterales
- Family: Asteraceae
- Subfamily: Asteroideae
- Tribe: Anthemideae
- Genus: Marasmodes; DC. (1838)

Type species
- Marasmodes polycephalus DC.

Synonyms
- Oligodorella Turcz. (1851)

Genus of shrubs

Marasmodes is a genus of South African shrubs in the chamomile tribe within the daisy family. It is endemic to the Cape Provinces of South Africa.

13 species are accepted:

- Marasmodes beyersiana S.Ortiz
- Marasmodes defoliata S.Ortiz
- Marasmodes dummeri Bolus ex Hutch.
- Marasmodes fasciculata S.Ortiz
- Marasmodes macrocephala S.Ortiz
- Marasmodes oligocephala DC.
- Marasmodes oubinae S.Ortiz
- Marasmodes polycephala DC.
- Marasmodes reflexa S.Ortiz
- Marasmodes schlechteri Magee & J.C.Manning
- Marasmodes spinosa S.Ortiz
- Marasmodes trifida S.Ortiz
- Marasmodes undulata Compton
