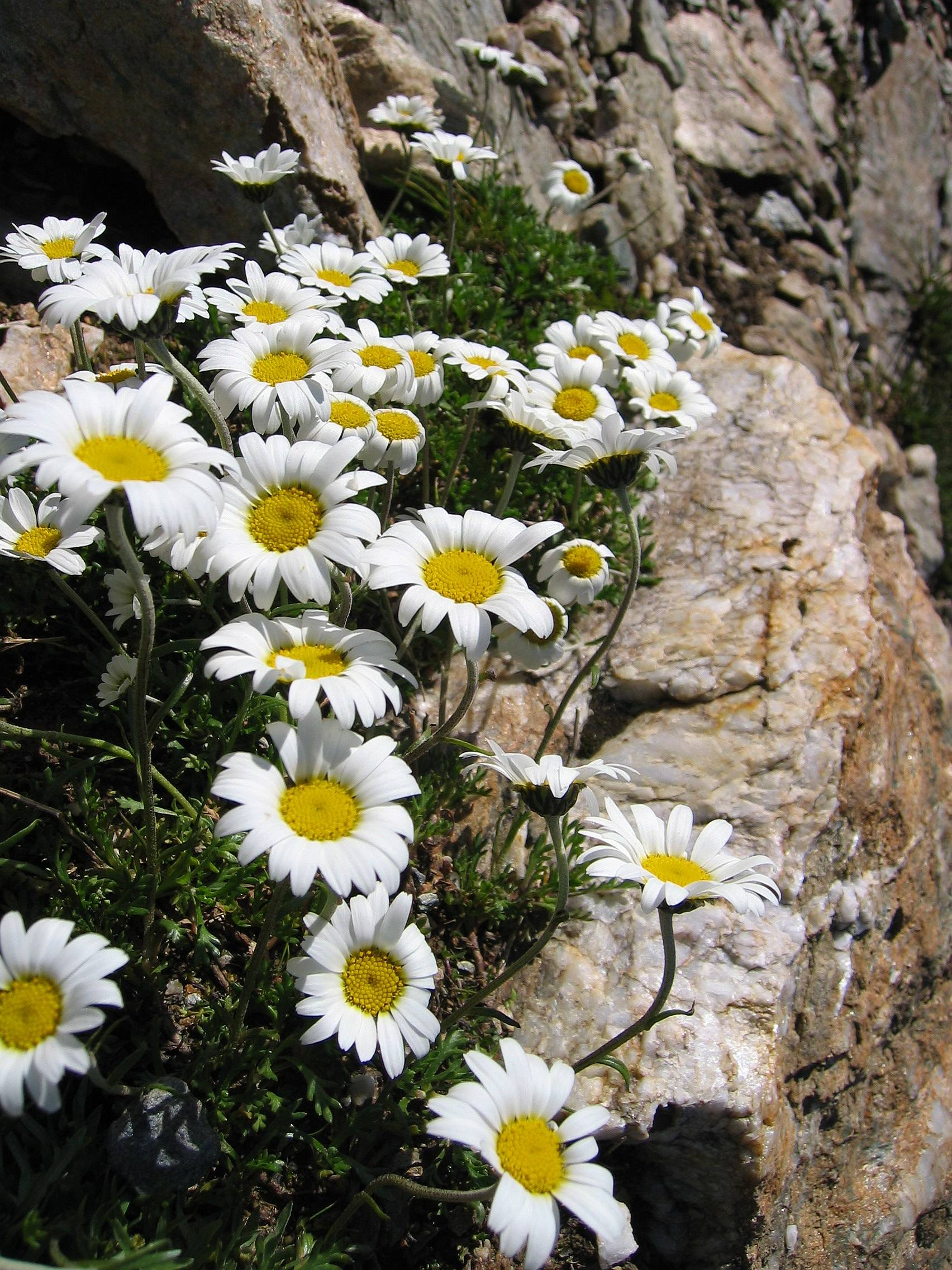
- Leucanthemopsis alpina

Scientific classification
- Kingdom: Plantae
- Clade: Tracheophytes
- Clade: Angiosperms
- Clade: Eudicots
- Clade: Asterids
- Order: Asterales
- Family: Asteraceae
- Subfamily: Asteroideae
- Tribe: Anthemideae
- Genus: Leucanthemopsis (Giroux) Heywood

Type species
- Leucanthemopsis alpina (L.) Heywood

Synonyms
- Tanacetum subsection Leucanthemopsis Giroux

= Leucanthemopsis =

Genus of flowering plants

Leucanthemopsis is a genus of flowering plants in the daisy family.

Species

- Leucanthemopsis alpina (L.) Heywood - central + southern Europe from Spain to Ukraine
- Leucanthemopsis flaveola (Hoffmanns. & Link) Heywood - Spain, Portugal
- Leucanthemopsis longipectinata (Font Quer) Heywood - Morocco
- Leucanthemopsis pallida (Mill.) Heywood - Spain
- Leucanthemopsis pallidaspathulifolia - Subbaetic Mountains in southern Spain
- Leucanthemopsis pectinata (L.) G.López & C.E.Jarvis - Morocco, Spain
- Leucanthemopsis pulverulenta (Lag.) Heywood - Spain, Portugal
- Leucanthemopsis trifurcatum (Desf.) Alavi - Morocco, Algeria, Tunisia, Libya
