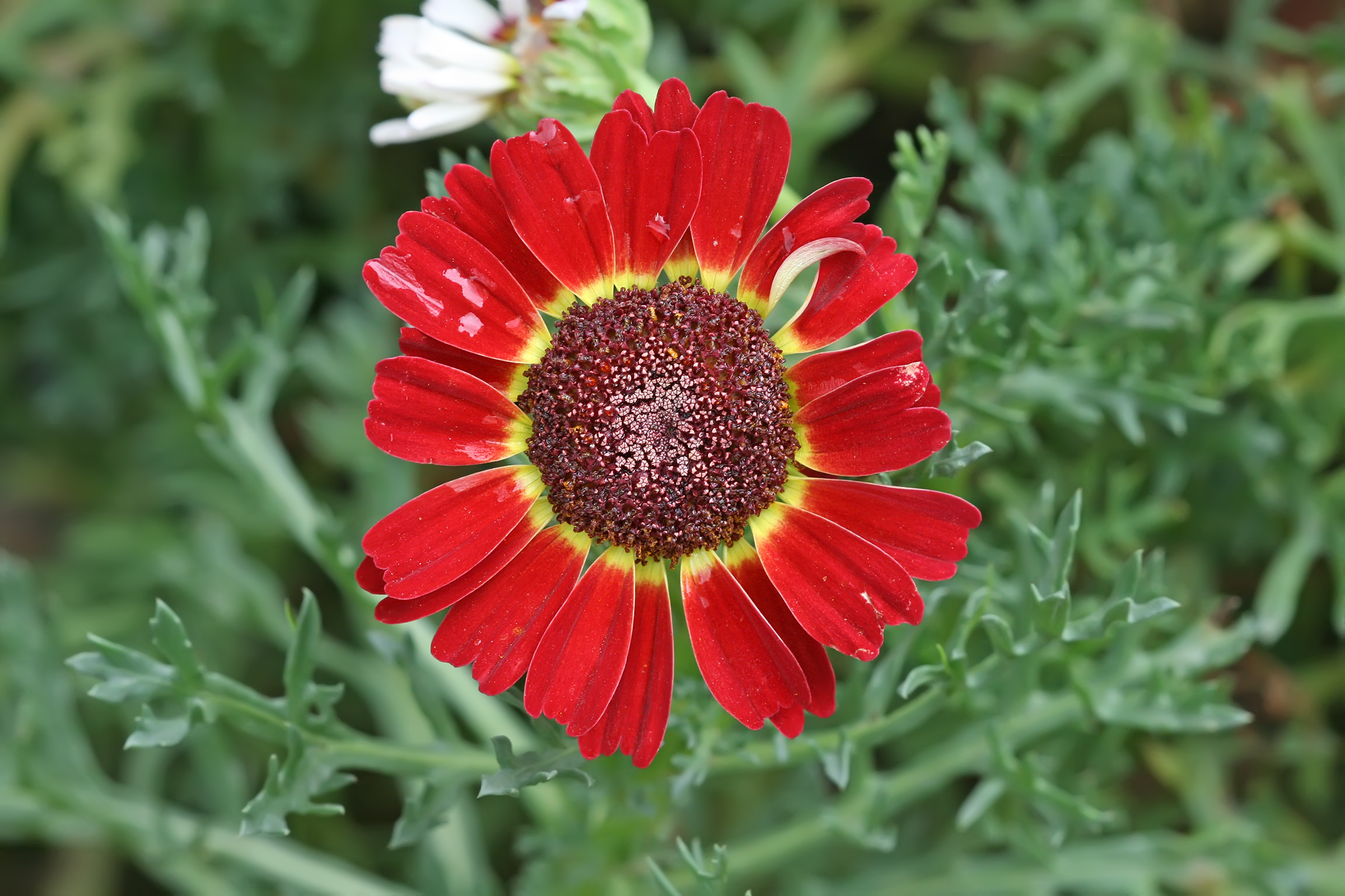
- Ismelia carinata

Scientific classification
- Kingdom: Plantae
- Clade: Tracheophytes
- Clade: Angiosperms
- Clade: Eudicots
- Clade: Asterids
- Order: Asterales
- Family: Asteraceae
- Subfamily: Asteroideae
- Tribe: Anthemideae; Cass.

Type genus
- Anthemis L.

Genera
- About 111, see text

= Anthemideae =

Tribe of flowering plants

Anthemideae is a tribe of flowering plants in the subfamily Asteroideae, which is part of the family Asteraceae. They are distributed worldwide, with concentrations in central Asia, the Mediterranean Basin, and southern Africa. Most species of plant known as chamomile belong to genera of this tribe.

As of 2006 there were about 1800 species classified in 111 genera. In 2007 the tribe was divided into 14 subtribes, including Glebionidinae, the source of hybrid garden marguerites.

== Genera ==
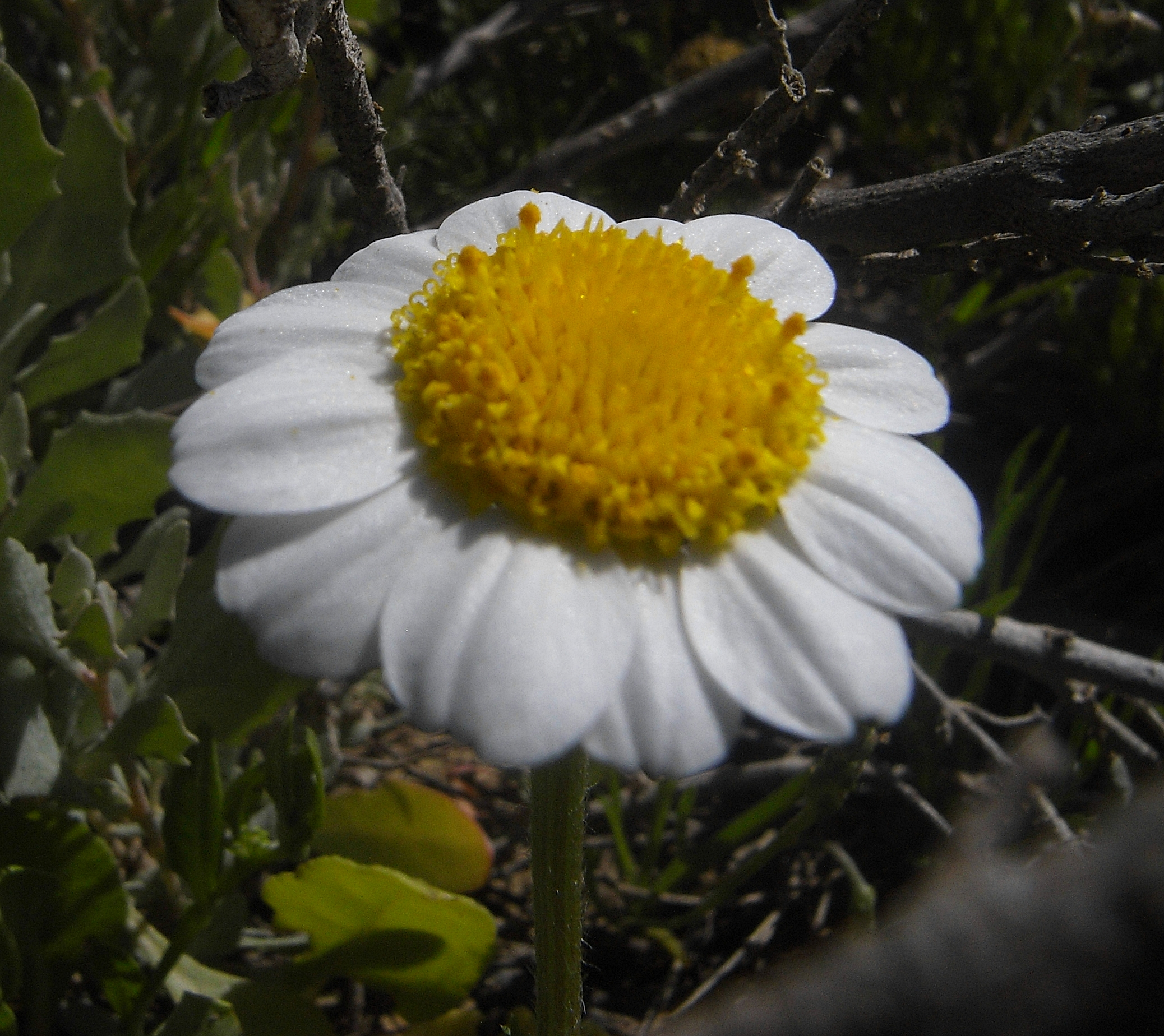
Anthemis maritima

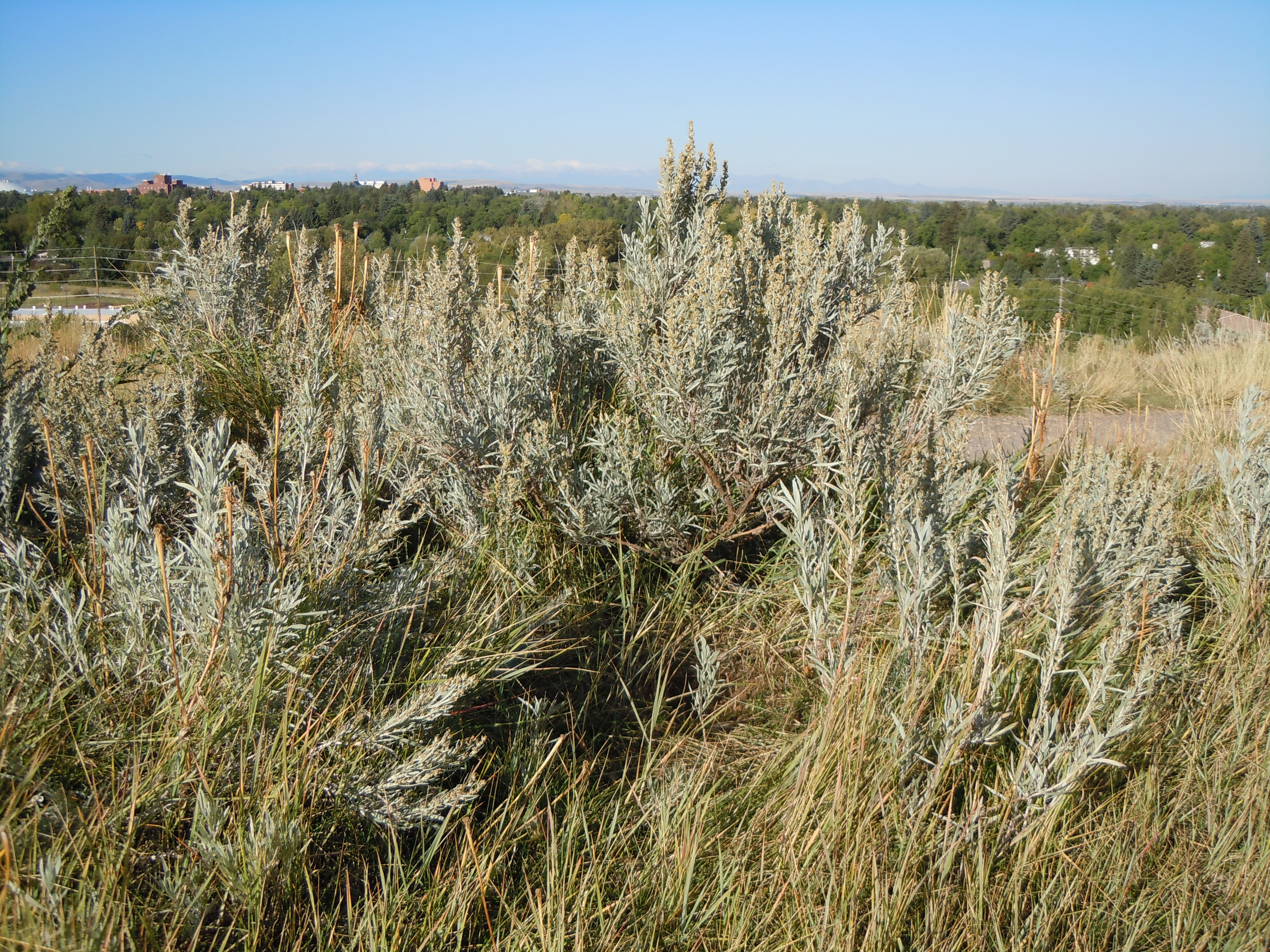
Artemisia cana

Anthemideae genera recognized by the Global Compositae Database as March 2022:

- × Anthematricaria
- × Anthemimatricaria
- Achillea L. (synonym Leucocyclus Boiss.)
- Adenanthellum B.Nord.
- Adenoglossa B.Nord.
- Ajania Poljakov (synonym Phaeostigma Muldashev)
- Ajaniopsis C.Shih
- Allardia Decne.
- Anacyclus L.
- Anthemis Mich. ex L.
- Arctanthemum (Tzvelev) Tzvelev
- Argyranthemum Webb
- Artemisia L. (synonym Artemisiella Ghafoor)
- Athanasia L.
- Brachanthemum DC.
- Brocchia Vis.
- Cancrinia Kar. & Kir.
- Cancriniella Tzvelev
- Castrilanthemum Vogt & Oberpr.
- Chamaemelum Mill.
- Chamomilla (Hall) Gray
- Chlamydophora Ehrenb. ex Less.
- Chrysanthemum L.
- Chrysanthoglossum B.H.Wilcox, K.Bremer & Humphries
- Cladanthus Cass.
- Coleostephus Cass.
- Cota J.Gay ex Guss.
- Cotula Tourn. ex L.
- Crossostephium Less.
- Cymbopappus B.Nord.
- Daveaua Willk. ex Mariz
- Elachanthemum Y.Ling & Y.R.Ling
- Endopappus Sch.Bip.
- Eriocephalus L.
- Eumorphia DC.
- Filifolium Kitam.
- Foveolina Källersjö
- Glebionis Cass.
- Glossopappus Kunze
- Gonospermum Less.
- Gymnopentzia Benth.
- Handelia Heimerl
- Heliocauta Humphries
- Heteranthemis Schott
- Heteromera Pomel
- Hilliardia B.Nord.
- Hippia L.
- Hippolytia Poljakov
- Hulteniella Tzvelev
- Hymenolepis Cass.
- Hymenostemma (Kunze) Kunze ex Willk.
- Inezia E.Phillips
- Inulanthera Källersjö
- Ismelia Cass.
- Kaschgaria Poljakov
- Lasiospermum Lag. (synonym Mataxa Spreng.)
- Lepidolopha C.Winkl.
- Lepidolopsis Poljakov
- Lepidophorum Neck. ex Cass.
- Leptinella Cass.
- Leucanthemella Tzvelev
- Leucanthemopsis (Giroux) Heywood
- Leucanthemum Mill.
- Leucoptera B.Nord.
- Lidbeckia P.J.Bergius
- Lonas Adans.
- Marasmodes DC.
- Matricaria L.
- Mauranthemum Vogt & Oberpr.
- Mausolea Bunge ex Poljakov
- Mecomischus Coss. & Durieu ex Benth. & Hook.f.
- Microcephala Pobed.
- Myxopappus Källersjö
- Nananthea DC.
- Neopallasia Poljakov
- Nipponanthemum (Kitam.) Kitam.
- Nivellea B.H.Wilcox, K.Bremer & Humphries
- Oncosiphon Källersjö
- Opisthopappus C.Shih
- Osmitopsis Cass. (synonym Bellidiastrum Less.)
- Otanthus Hoffmanns. & Link
- Otoglyphis Pomel (synonym Aaronsohnia Warb. & Eig)
- Otospermum Willk.
- Pentzia Thunb.
- Phalacrocarpum (DC.) Willk.
- Phymaspermum Less.
- Picrothamnus Nutt.
- Plagius L'Hér. ex DC.
- Polychrysum (Tzvelev) Kovalevsk.
- Prolongoa Boiss.
- Pseudoglossanthis Poljakov
- Pseudohandelia Tzvelev
- Rennera Merxm.
- Rhetinolepis Coss.
- Rhodanthemum B.H.Wilcox, K.Bremer & Humphries
- Richteria Kar. & Kir.
- Santolina L.
- Schistostephium Less.
- Sclerorhachis (Rech.f.) Rech.f.
- Soliva Ruiz & Pav.
- Sphaeromeria Nutt.
- Stilpnolepis Krasch.
- Tanacetopsis (Tzvelev) Kovalevsk.
- Tanacetum L.
- Thaminophyllum Harv.
- Trichanthemis Regel & Schmalh.
- Tridactylina (DC.) Sch.Bip.
- Tripleurospermum Sch.Bip.
- Turaniphytum Poljakov
- Tzvelevopyrethrum Kamelin
- Ugamia Pavlov
- Ursinia Gaertn.
- Vogtia Oberpr. & Sonboli
- Xylanthemum Tzvelev
