= Inulanthera =

Scientific classification
- Kingdom: Plantae
- Clade: Tracheophytes
- Clade: Angiosperms
- Clade: Eudicots
- Clade: Asterids
- Order: Asterales
- Family: Asteraceae
- Subfamily: Asteroideae
- Tribe: Anthemideae
- Genus: Inulanthera; M. Källersjö

Type species
- Inulanthera calva (J. Hutchinson) M. Källersjö

Genus of flowering plants

Inulanthera is a genus of flowering plants in the daisy family, native to Madagascar and southern Africa.

Species

- Inulanthera brownii (Hochr.) Källersjö
- Inulanthera calva (Hutch.) Källersjö
- Inulanthera coronopifolia (Harv.) Källersjö
- Inulanthera dregeana (DC.) Källersjö
- Inulanthera leucoclada (DC.) Källersjö
- Inulanthera montana Källersjö
- Inulanthera nuda Källersjö
- Inulanthera schistostephioides (Hiern) Källersjö
- Inulanthera thodei (Bolus) Källersjö
- Inulanthera tridens (Oliv.) Källersjö
