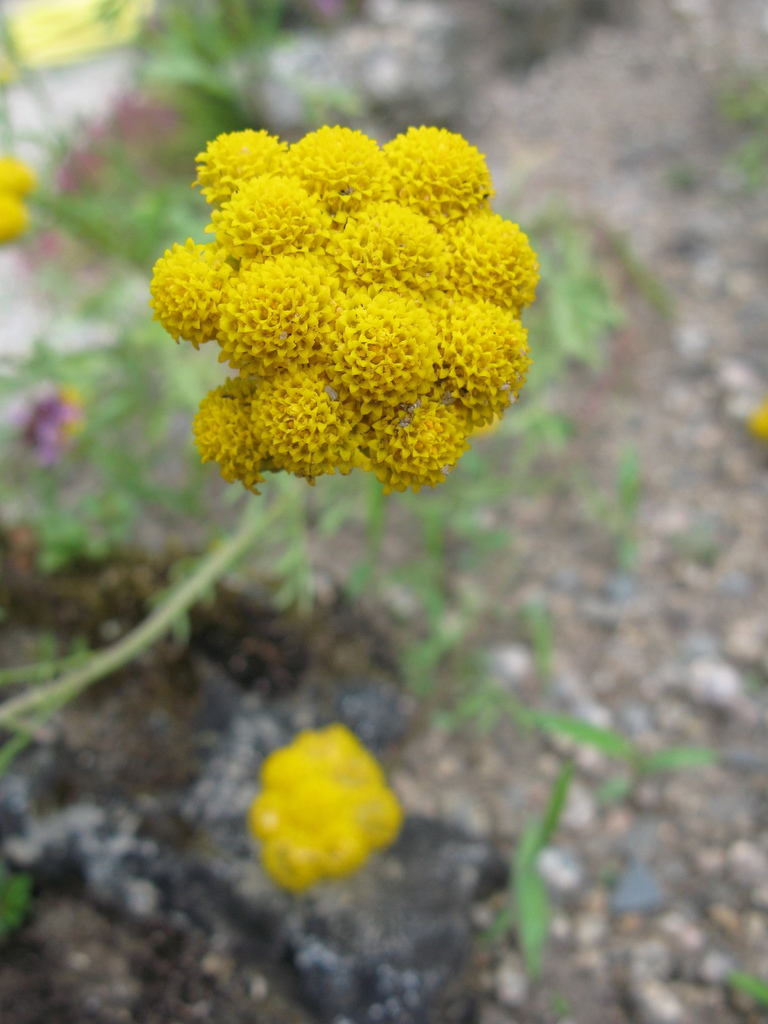

Scientific classification
- Kingdom: Plantae
- Clade: Embryophytes
- Clade: Tracheophytes
- Clade: Angiosperms
- Clade: Eudicots
- Clade: Asterids
- Order: Asterales
- Family: Asteraceae
- Subfamily: Asteroideae
- Tribe: Anthemideae
- Genus: Lonas; Adans.
- Species: L. annua

Binomial name
- Lonas annua Vines & Druce

Synonyms
- Species synonymy: Achillea inodora L.; Athanasia annua (L.) L.; Lonas inodora Gaertn.; Lonas minima Cass.; Lonas umbellata Cass.; Santolina annua L.

= Lonas =

Genus of flowering plants

Lonas is a genus of flowering plants in the chamomile tribe within the daisy family. There is only one accepted species, Lonas annua, native to Italy, France, Germany, Algeria, Morocco, and Tunisia.
