= Foveolina =

Scientific classification
- Kingdom: Plantae
- Clade: Tracheophytes
- Clade: Angiosperms
- Clade: Eudicots
- Clade: Asterids
- Order: Asterales
- Family: Asteraceae
- Subfamily: Asteroideae
- Tribe: Anthemideae
- Genus: Foveolina; Källersjö

Type species
- Foveolina dichotoma (DC.) Källersjö

Genus of flowering plants

Foveolina is a genus of flowering plants in the daisy family, native to southern Africa.

Species

- Foveolina albidiformis (Thell.) Källersjö - Cape Province
- Foveolina dichotoma (DC.) Källersjö - Cape Province
- Foveolina schinziana (Thell.) Källersjö - Namibia
- Foveolina tenella (DC.) Källersjö - Cape Province
