= Rhetinolepis =

Scientific classification
- Kingdom: Plantae
- Clade: Tracheophytes
- Clade: Angiosperms
- Clade: Eudicots
- Clade: Asterids
- Order: Asterales
- Family: Asteraceae
- Subfamily: Asteroideae
- Tribe: Anthemideae
- Genus: Rhetinolepis; Coss.
- Species: R. lonadioides

Binomial name
- Rhetinolepis lonadioides Coss.

Monotypic flowering plant genus

Rhetinolepis is a monotypic genus of flowering plants belonging to the family Asteraceae. The only species is Rhetinolepis lonadioides.

Its native range is Northwestern Africa.
