= Polychrysum =

Scientific classification
- Kingdom: Plantae
- Clade: Tracheophytes
- Clade: Angiosperms
- Clade: Eudicots
- Clade: Asterids
- Order: Asterales
- Family: Asteraceae
- Subfamily: Asteroideae
- Tribe: Anthemideae
- Genus: Polychrysum; Kovalevsk.
- Species: P. tadshikorum

Binomial name
- Polychrysum tadshikorum (Kudr.) Kovalevsk.

Synonyms
- Tanacetum tadshikorum Kudr.; Cancrinia tadshikorum (Kudr.) Tzvelev; Chrysanthemum myriocephalum Rech.f.

Genus of plants

Polychrysum is a genus of flowering plants in the daisy family.

There is only one known species, Polychrysum tadshikorum, native to Afghanistan.
