= Leucoptera (plant) =

Scientific classification
- Kingdom: Plantae
- Clade: Tracheophytes
- Clade: Angiosperms
- Clade: Eudicots
- Clade: Asterids
- Order: Asterales
- Family: Asteraceae
- Subfamily: Asteroideae
- Tribe: Anthemideae
- Genus: Leucoptera; B.Nord.

Type species
- Leucoptera nodosa (Thunb.) B.Nord.

Genus of flowering plants

Leucoptera is a small genus of flowering plants in chamomile tribe within the daisy family.

Species

- Leucoptera asterocarpa Mart. - Brazil
- Leucoptera nodosa (Thunb.) B.Nord. - South Africa
- Leucoptera oppositifolia B.Nord. - South Africa
- Leucoptera subcarnosa B.Nord. - South Africa
