= Brocchia =

Scientific classification
- Kingdom: Plantae
- Clade: Tracheophytes
- Clade: Angiosperms
- Clade: Eudicots
- Clade: Asterids
- Order: Asterales
- Family: Asteraceae
- Subfamily: Asteroideae
- Tribe: Anthemideae
- Genus: Brocchia; Vis.
- Species: B. cinerea

Binomial name
- Brocchia cinerea (Delile) Vis.

Genus of flowering plants

Brocchia is a genus of flowering plants belonging to the family Asteraceae. It contains a single species, Brocchia cinerea.

Its native range is Sahara and Sahel to Jordan, Arabian Peninsula, Comoros.
