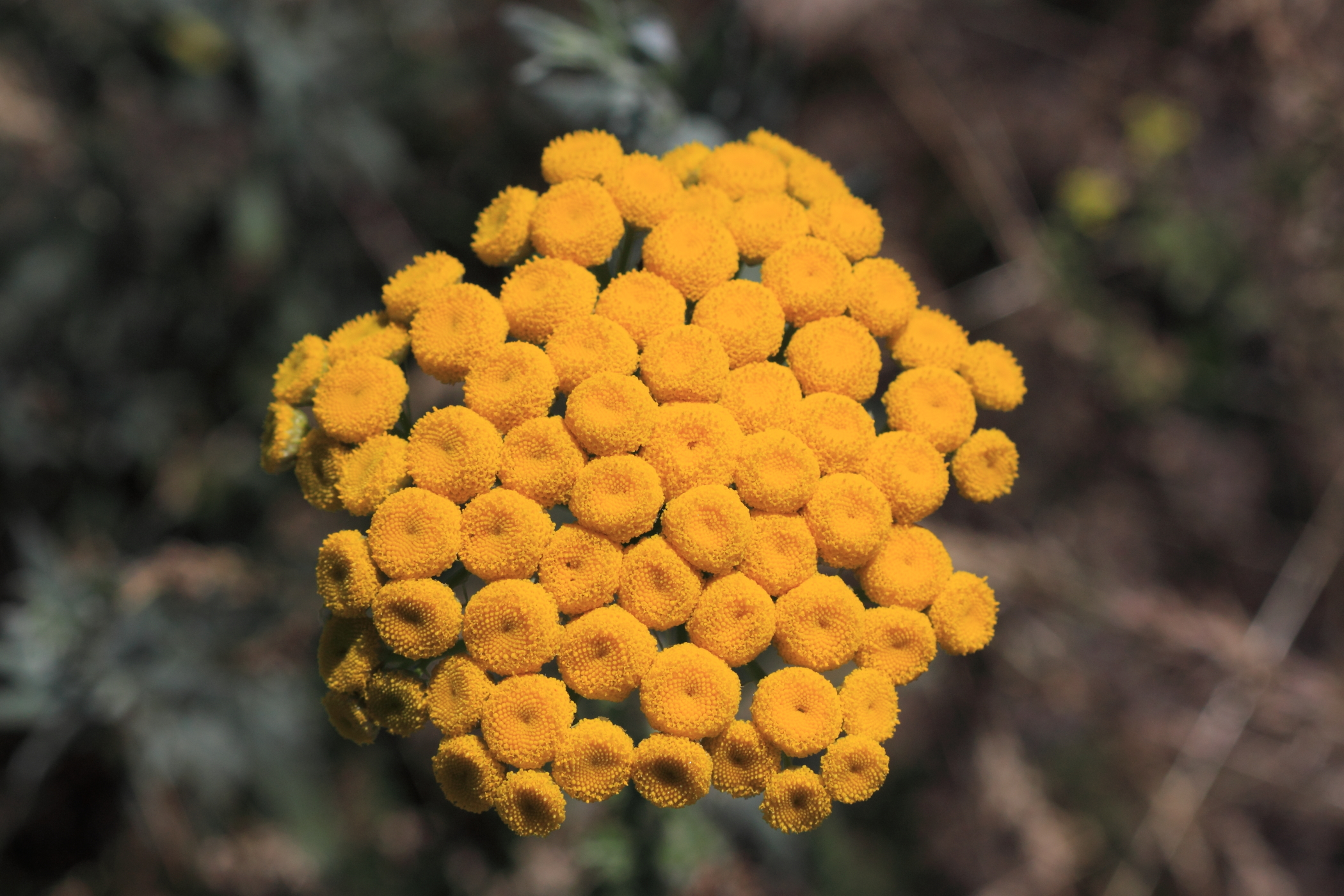

Scientific classification
- Kingdom: Plantae
- Clade: Embryophytes
- Clade: Tracheophytes
- Clade: Angiosperms
- Clade: Eudicots
- Clade: Asterids
- Order: Asterales
- Family: Asteraceae
- Subfamily: Asteroideae
- Tribe: Anthemideae
- Genus: Pseudohandelia; Tzvelev
- Species: P. umbellifera

Binomial name
- Pseudohandelia umbellifera (Boiss.) Tzvelev

Synonyms
- Tanacetum umbelliferum Boiss.; Pyrethrum umbelliferum (Boiss.) Boiss.; Chrysanthemum trichophyllum (Regel & Schmalh.) Kuntze; Chrysanthemum umbelliferum (Boiss.) O.Hoffm.; Chrysanthemum floccosum Kitam.; Tanacetum trichophyllum Regel & Schmalh.

= Pseudohandelia =

Genus of plants

Pseudohandelia is a genus of flowering plants in the chamomile tribe within the daisy family.

Species

The only known species is Pseudohandelia umbellifera, native to Altai Krai, Kazakhstan, Turkmenistan, Uzbekistan, Kyrgyzstan, Afghanistan, Iran, Tajikistan.
