= Microcephala =

Scientific classification
- Kingdom: Plantae
- Clade: Tracheophytes
- Clade: Angiosperms
- Clade: Eudicots
- Clade: Asterids
- Order: Asterales
- Family: Asteraceae
- Subfamily: Asteroideae
- Tribe: Anthemideae
- Genus: Microcephala; Pobed.

Type species
- Microcephala lamellata (Bunge) Pobed.

Genus of plants

Microcephala is a genus of Asian flowering plants in the chamomile tribe within the daisy family.

Species

- Microcephala afghanica Podlech - Afghanistan
- Microcephala deserticola Podlech - Afghanistan
- Microcephala lamellata (Bunge) Pobed. - Irkutsk, Kazakhstan, Uzbekistan, Kyrgyzstan, Tajikistan, Turkmenistan, Xinjiang
- Microcephala subglobosa (Krasch.) Pobed. - Irkutsk
- Microcephala turcomanica (C.Winkl.) Pobed. - Uzbekistan, Kyrgyzstan, Tajikistan, Turkmenistan, Iran
