= Turaniphytum =

Scientific classification
- Kingdom: Plantae
- Clade: Tracheophytes
- Clade: Angiosperms
- Clade: Eudicots
- Clade: Asterids
- Order: Asterales
- Family: Asteraceae
- Subfamily: Asteroideae
- Tribe: Anthemideae
- Genus: Turaniphytum; P.P.Poljakov

Type species
- Turaniphytum eranthemum (Bunge) P.P.Poljakov

Genus of flowering plants

Turaniphytum is a genus of Asian plants in the chamomile tribe within the daisy family.

Species

- Turaniphytum codringtonii (Rech.f.) Podlech - Afghanistan
- Turaniphytum eranthemum (Bunge) Poljakov - Kazakhstan, Uzbekistan, Altai Krai
