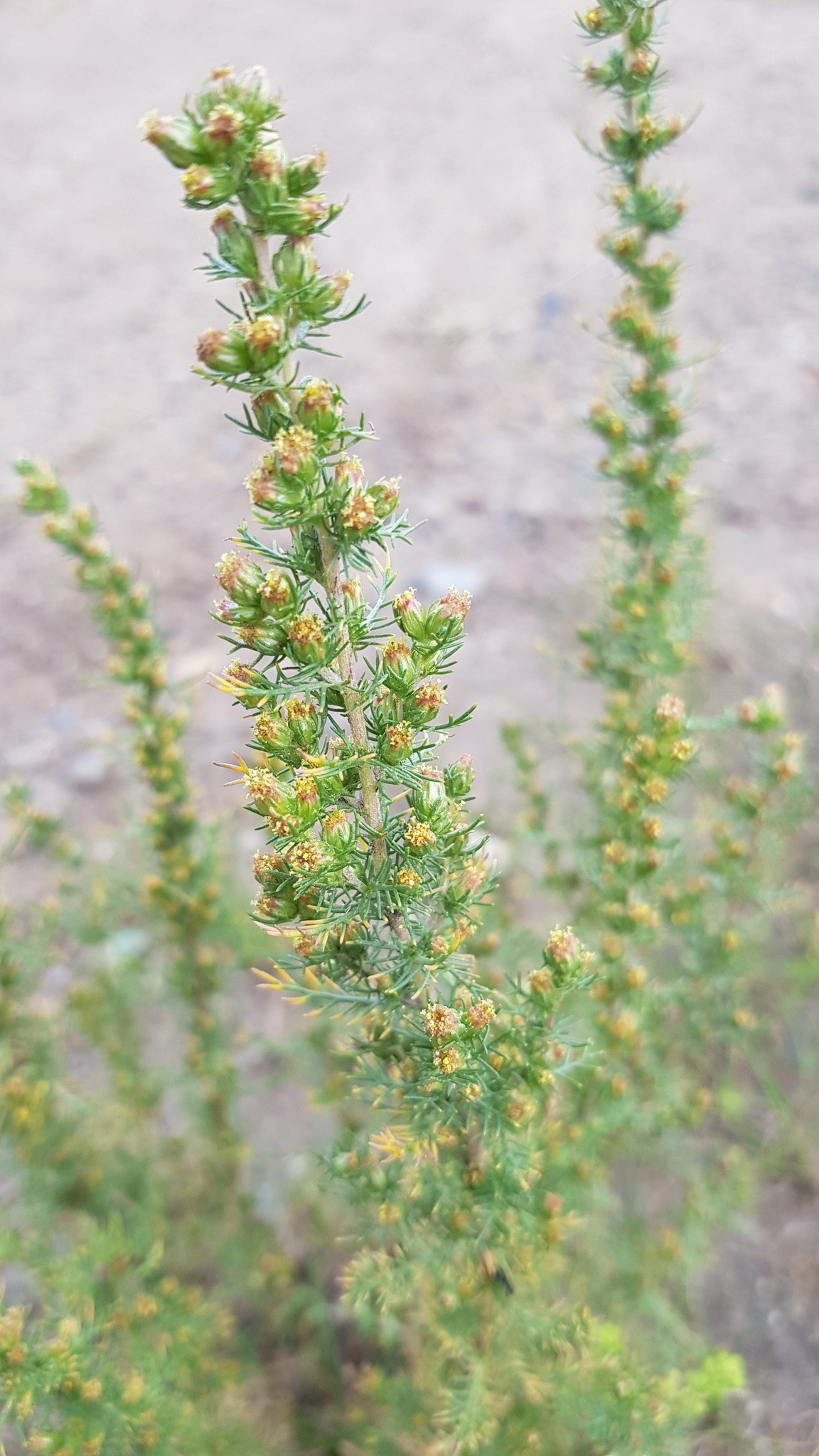

Scientific classification
- Kingdom: Plantae
- Clade: Tracheophytes
- Clade: Angiosperms
- Clade: Eudicots
- Clade: Asterids
- Order: Asterales
- Family: Asteraceae
- Subfamily: Asteroideae
- Tribe: Anthemideae
- Genus: Neopallasia; Poljakov
- Species: N. pectinata

Binomial name
- Neopallasia pectinata (Pallas) Poljakov

Synonyms
- Artemisia pectinata Pall.; Artemisia yunnanensis (Pamp.) Krasch.; Neopallasia yunnanensis (Pamp.) Y.R.Ling; Neopallasia tibetica Y.R.Ling; Artemisia pectinata var. yunnanensis Pamp.

= Neopallasia =

Genus of flowering plants

Neopallasia is a genus of Asian flowering plants in the chamomile tribe within the daisy family. Molecular data indicate that Neopallasia is closely related to Seriphidium and could be easily included with that genus.

Species

The only accepted species is Neopallasia pectinata. Neopallasia pectinata is an erect herb, 12–40 cm tall with pinnately divided sessile oblong-elliptic leaves. This plant of deserts grows in gravelly river valleys and wastelands at 1300–3400 m elevation. This variable species is known from northern and western China (provinces of Gansu, Hebei, Heilongjiang, Jilin, Liaoning, Inner Mongolia, Ningxia, Qinghai, Shanxi, Shaanxi, Sichuan, Xinjiang, Yunnan, Tibet) as well as Kazakhstan, Kyrgyzstan, Uzbekistan, Mongolia, and Russia (Altay and Chita).
