= Cymbopappus =

Scientific classification
- Kingdom: Plantae
- Clade: Tracheophytes
- Clade: Angiosperms
- Clade: Eudicots
- Clade: Asterids
- Order: Asterales
- Family: Asteraceae
- Subfamily: Asteroideae
- Tribe: Anthemideae
- Genus: Cymbopappus; B.Nord.

Type species
- Cymbopappus lasiopodus (Hutch.) B.Nord.

Synonyms
- Adenoselen Spach (1841), orth. var.; Adenosolen DC. (1838)

Genus of flowering plants

Cymbopappus is a genus of flowering plants in the daisy family. The genus is endemic to South Africa.

Three species are accepted:

- Cymbopappus adenosolen (Harv.) B.Nord. - Cape Provinces
- Cymbopappus hilliardiae B.Nord. - Cape Provinces
- Cymbopappus piliferus (Thell.) B.Nord. - Northern Provinces (Limpopo)
