= Pseudoglossanthis =

Scientific classification
- Kingdom: Plantae
- Clade: Tracheophytes
- Clade: Angiosperms
- Clade: Eudicots
- Clade: Asterids
- Order: Asterales
- Family: Asteraceae
- Subfamily: Asteroideae
- Tribe: Anthemideae
- Genus: Pseudoglossanthis; Poljakov

Synonyms
- Glossanthis Poljakov

Genus of flowering plants

Pseudoglossanthis is a genus of flowering plants in the family Asteraceae. It includes five species native to Kazakhstan, Kyrgyzstan, and Uzbekistan in Central Asia.

== Species ==
Five species are accepted.

- Pseudoglossanthis arctodshungarica (Golosk.) Kamelin
- Pseudoglossanthis aulieatensis (B.Fedtsch.) Kamelin
- Pseudoglossanthis butkovii (Kovalevsk.) Kamelin
- Pseudoglossanthis litwinowii (Krasch.) Kamelin
- Pseudoglossanthis simulans (Pavlov) Kamelin
