= Heteromera =

Scientific classification
- Kingdom: Plantae
- Clade: Tracheophytes
- Clade: Angiosperms
- Clade: Eudicots
- Clade: Asterids
- Order: Asterales
- Family: Asteraceae
- Subfamily: Asteroideae
- Tribe: Anthemideae
- Genus: Heteromera; Pomel 1874 not Montrouz. ex Beauvis. 1901 (syn of Leptostylis in Sapotaceae)

Genus of flowering plants

Heteromera is a genus of flowering plants in the daisy family described as a genus in 1874. Heteromera is native to North Africa.

== Species ==
Species include:

- Heteromera fuscata (Desf.) Pomel - Algeria, Morocco, Tunisia, Libya
- Heteromera macrocarpa Pomel - Algeria
- Heteromera philaenorum Maire & Weiller - Cyrenaica region of Libya

== Homonym genus in Sapotaceae ==
- Heteromera Montrouz. ex Beauvis syn of Leptostylis
- Heteromera rotundifolium Montrouz. ex Beauvis., syn of Leptostylis micrantha Beauvis.
