= Lepidophorum =

Scientific classification
- Kingdom: Plantae
- Clade: Tracheophytes
- Clade: Angiosperms
- Clade: Eudicots
- Clade: Asterids
- Order: Asterales
- Family: Asteraceae
- Subfamily: Asteroideae
- Tribe: Anthemideae
- Genus: Lepidophorum; Necker ex Cass.
- Species: L. repandum

Binomial name
- Lepidophorum repandum (L.) DC.

Synonyms
- Lepidophorum Neck. not validly published; Lepidophorum Neck. ex DC.; Anthemis repanda L.; Chamaemelum grisleyi (Samp.) Vasc.; Anthemis grisleyi Samp.; Lepidophorum grisleyi (Samp.) Samp.

Genus of flowering plants

Lepidophorum is a monotypic genus of flowering plants in the daisy family. Its only known species is Lepidophorum repandum, native to Spain and Portugal.
