= Endopappus =

Scientific classification
- Kingdom: Plantae
- Clade: Tracheophytes
- Clade: Angiosperms
- Clade: Eudicots
- Clade: Asterids
- Order: Asterales
- Family: Asteraceae
- Subfamily: Asteroideae
- Tribe: Anthemideae
- Genus: Endopappus; Sch.Bip.
- Species: E. macrocarpus

Binomial name
- Endopappus macrocarpus Sch.Bip.

Synonyms
- Chrysanthemum macrocarpum (Sch.Bip.) Coss. & Kralik ex Batt.; Prolongoa macrocarpa Alavi; Chrysanthemum macrocarpum var. aureum L.Chevall.

Genus of flowering plants

Endopappus is a genus of flowering plants in the daisy family described as a genus in 1860. There is only one known species, Endopappus macrocarpus, native to North Africa (Morocco, Algeria, Tunisia, Libya).

== Species and subspecies ==
There is one species consisting of two subspecies:

- Endopappus macrocarpus subsp. macrocarpus - Morocco, Algeria, Tunisia, Libya
- Endopappus macrocarpus subsp. maroccanus (Jahand., Maire & Weiller) Ibn Tattou - Morocco
