= Otospermum =

Scientific classification
- Kingdom: Plantae
- Clade: Tracheophytes
- Clade: Angiosperms
- Clade: Eudicots
- Clade: Asterids
- Order: Asterales
- Family: Asteraceae
- Subfamily: Asteroideae
- Tribe: Anthemideae
- Genus: Otospermum; Willk.
- Species: O. glabrum

Binomial name
- Otospermum glabrum (Lag.) Willk.

Synonyms
- Otocarpum Willk.; Pyrethrum glabrum Lag.; Matricaria glabra Lag.; Matricaria glabra (Lag.) Ball; Otocarpum glabrum (Lag.) Willk.

Genus of flowering plants

Otospermum is a genus of flowering plants in the chamomile tribe within the daisy family.

Species

The only known species is Otospermum glabrum, native to France, Spain, Portugal, Morocco, Algeria, Tunisia, and Libya.
