= Trichanthemis =

Scientific classification
- Kingdom: Plantae
- Clade: Tracheophytes
- Clade: Angiosperms
- Clade: Eudicots
- Clade: Asterids
- Order: Asterales
- Family: Asteraceae
- Subfamily: Asteroideae
- Tribe: Anthemideae
- Genus: Trichanthemis; Regel & Schmalh.

Type species
- Trichanthemis karataviensis Regel & Schmalh.

Genus of plants

Trichanthemis is a genus of Central Asian plants in the chamomile tribe within the daisy family.

== Species ==
Six species are accepted.

- Trichanthemis afghanica Podlech – Afghanistan (Bamyan)
- Trichanthemis aurea Krasch. – Kazakhstan and Uzbekistan
- Trichanthemis glabriflora Novopokr. & Sidorenko – Kyrgyzstan
- Trichanthemis karataviensis Regel & Schmalh. - Kazakhstan, Kyrgyzstan, Tajikistan, and Uzbekistan
- Trichanthemis paradoxus (C.Winkl.) Tzvelev - Kazakhstan, Kyrgyzstan, and Uzbekistan
- Trichanthemis radiata Krasch. & Vved. - Kazakhstan and Kyrgyzstan
