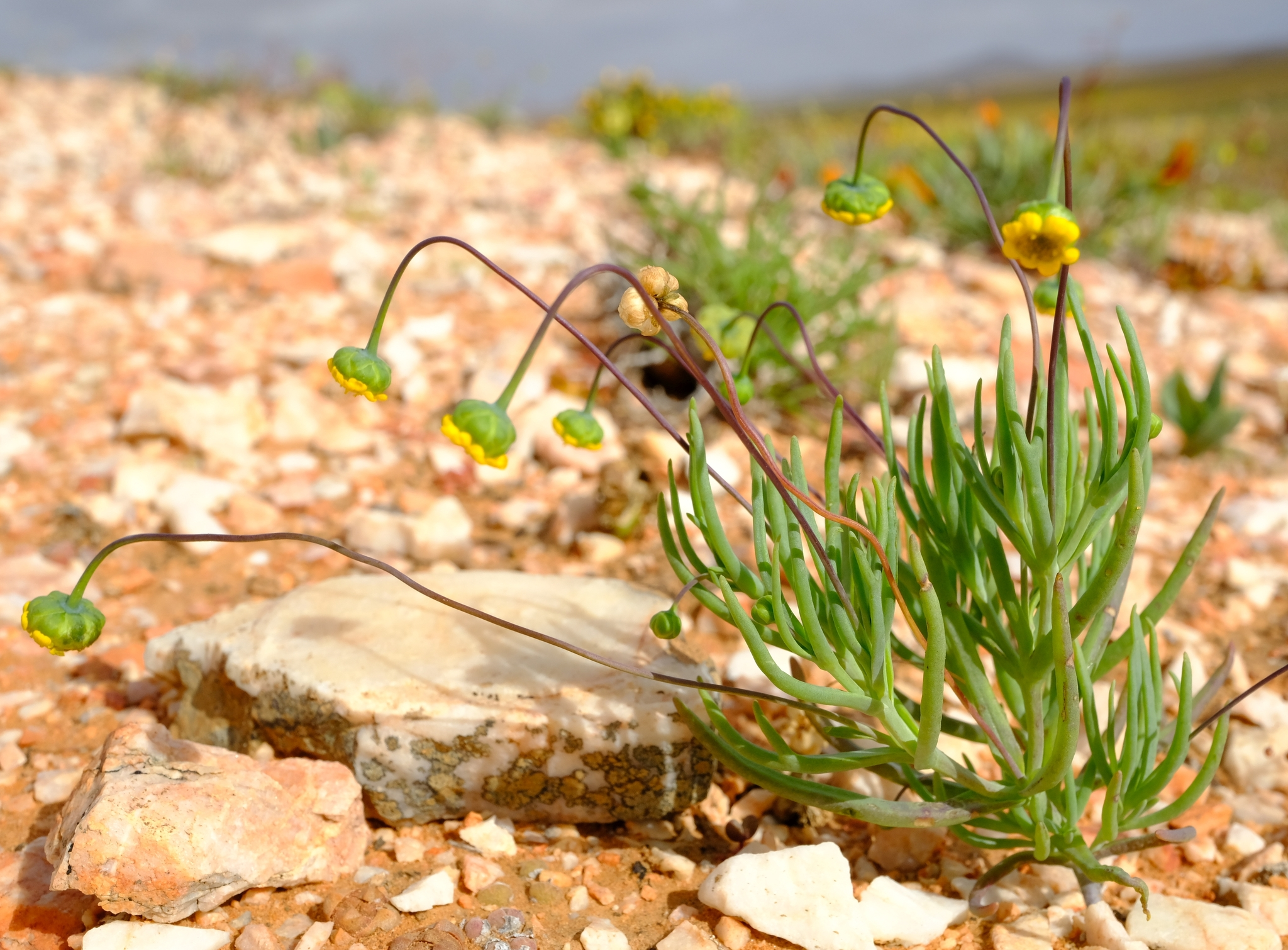

Scientific classification
- Kingdom: Plantae
- Clade: Tracheophytes
- Clade: Angiosperms
- Clade: Eudicots
- Clade: Asterids
- Order: Asterales
- Family: Asteraceae
- Subfamily: Asteroideae
- Tribe: Anthemideae
- Genus: Adenoglossa; B.Nord
- Species: A. decurrens

Binomial name
- Adenoglossa decurrens (Hutch.) B.Nord.

Synonyms
- Chrysanthemum decurrens Hutch.

= Adenoglossa =

Genus of flowering plants

Adenoglossa is a genus of flowering plants in the daisy family described as a genus in 1976. There is only one known species, Adenoglossa decurrens, endemic to the Cape Provinces of South Africa.
