= Gymnopentzia =

Scientific classification
- Kingdom: Plantae
- Clade: Tracheophytes
- Clade: Angiosperms
- Clade: Eudicots
- Clade: Asterids
- Order: Asterales
- Family: Asteraceae
- Subfamily: Asteroideae
- Tribe: Anthemideae
- Genus: Gymnopentzia; Benth.
- Species: G. bifurcata

Binomial name
- Gymnopentzia bifurcata Benth.

Synonyms
- Athanasia turbinata Burtt Davy; Gymnopentzia pilifera N.E.Br.

Genus of flowering plants

Gymnopentzia is a genus of African plants in the chamomile tribe within the sunflower family.

The only known species is Gymnopentzia bifurcata, native to Lesotho and South Africa.
