= Allardia =

Scientific classification
- Kingdom: Plantae
- Clade: Tracheophytes
- Clade: Angiosperms
- Clade: Eudicots
- Clade: Asterids
- Order: Asterales
- Family: Asteraceae
- Subfamily: Asteroideae
- Tribe: Anthemideae
- Genus: Allardia; Decne.

Genus of flowering plants

Allardia is a genus of flowering plants in the daisy family described as a genus in 1841.

Allardia is native to Tibet and Central Asia.

Species

- Allardia glabra DC.
- Allardia huegelii Sch. Bip.
- Allardia lasiocarpa (G. X. Fu) K. Bremer & C. J. Humphries - Tibet
- Allardia nivea Hook. fil. & Thoms. ex C. B. Cl.
- Allardia stoliczkae C. B. Cl.
- Allardia tomentosa DC.
- Allardia transalaica (Tzvel.) K. Bremer & C. J. Humphries - Central Asia
- Allardia tridactylites (Kar. & Kir.) Sch. Bip.
- Allardia vestita Hook. fil. & Thoms. ex C. B. Cl.
