= Prolongoa =

Scientific classification
- Kingdom: Plantae
- Clade: Embryophytes
- Clade: Tracheophytes
- Clade: Angiosperms
- Clade: Eudicots
- Clade: Asterids
- Order: Asterales
- Family: Asteraceae
- Subfamily: Asteroideae
- Tribe: Anthemideae
- Genus: Prolongoa; Boiss.
- Species: P. hispanica

Binomial name
- Prolongoa hispanica G.López & C.E.Jarvis

Genus of flowering plants

Prolongoa is a genus of Spanish plants in the chamomile tribe within the daisy family.

Species

The only accepted species is Prolongoa hispanica, native to Spain.
