= Plagius =

Scientific classification
- Kingdom: Plantae
- Clade: Tracheophytes
- Clade: Angiosperms
- Clade: Eudicots
- Clade: Asterids
- Order: Asterales
- Family: Asteraceae
- Subfamily: Asteroideae
- Tribe: Anthemideae
- Genus: Plagius; L'Hér. ex DC.

Genus of plants

Plagius is a genus of Mediterranean plants in the chamomile tribe within the daisy family.

Species

- Plagius flosculosus (L.) Alavi & Heywood - Corsica, Sardinia
- Plagius grandis (L.) Alavi & Heywood - Algeria, Tunisia
- Plagius maghrebinus Vogt & Greuter - Morocco, Algeria, Tunisia
