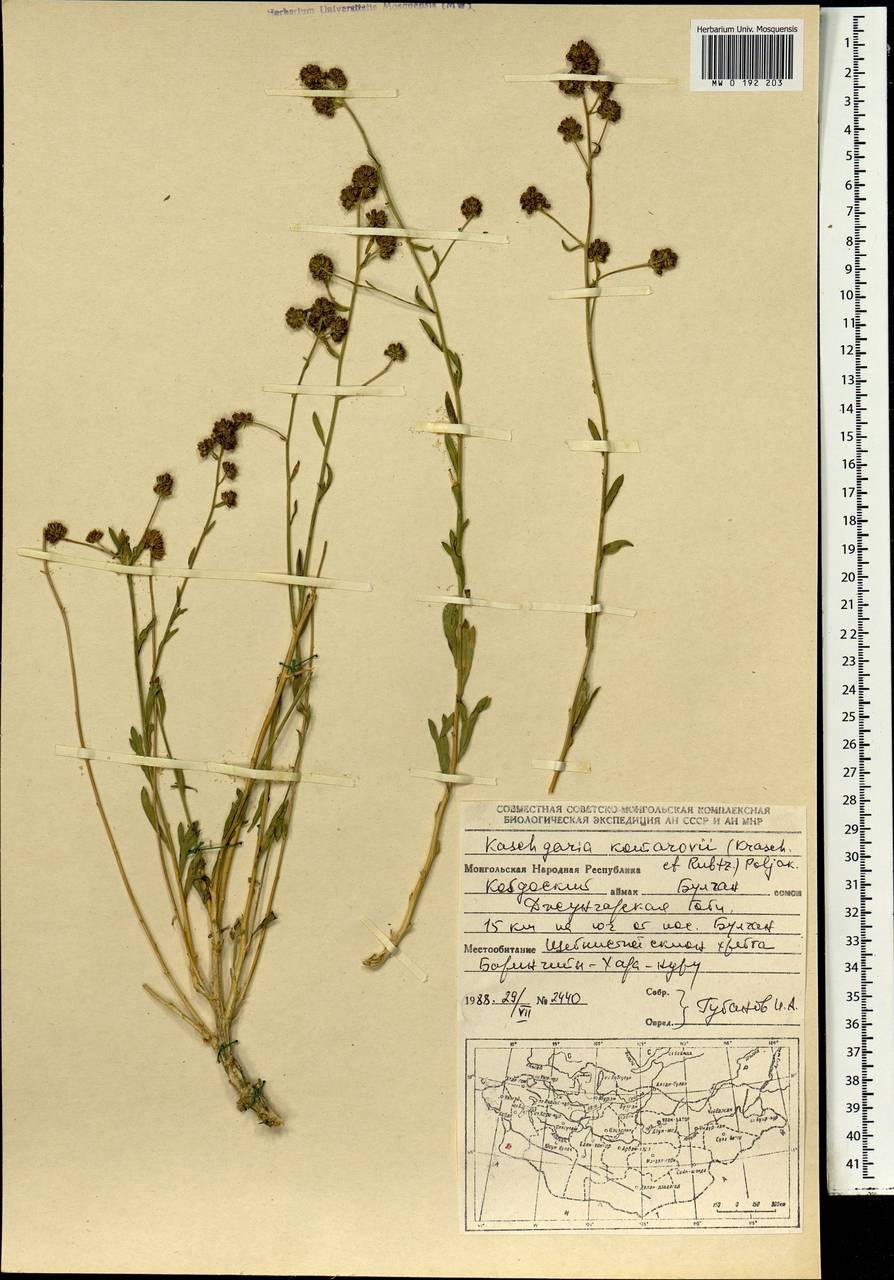

Scientific classification
- Kingdom: Plantae
- Clade: Tracheophytes
- Clade: Angiosperms
- Clade: Eudicots
- Clade: Asterids
- Order: Asterales
- Family: Asteraceae
- Tribe: Anthemideae
- Genus: Kaschgaria; Poljakov

Type species
- Kaschgaria brachanthemoides (C.Winkl.) Poljakov

= Kaschgaria =

Genus of flowering plants

Kaschgaria is a genus of flowering plants in the daisy family.

Species

- Kaschgaria brachanthemoides (C.Winkl.) Poljakov - Xinjiang, Kazakhstan, Uzbekistan, Kyrgyzstan, Altay
- Kaschgaria komarovii (Krasch. & N.I.Rubtzov) Poljakov - Xinjiang, Kazakhstan, Mongolia, Altay
