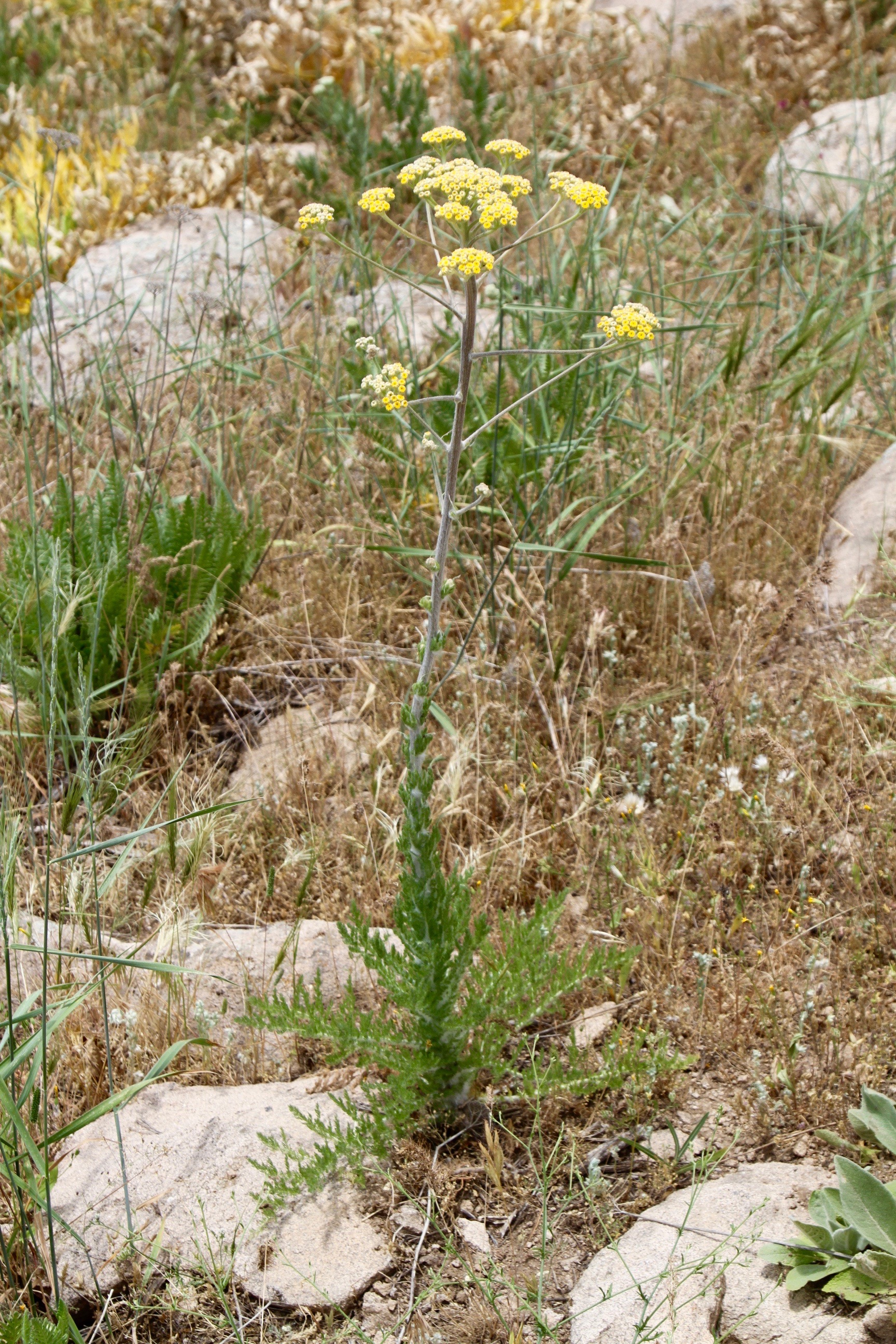

Scientific classification
- Kingdom: Plantae
- Clade: Embryophytes
- Clade: Tracheophytes
- Clade: Angiosperms
- Clade: Eudicots
- Clade: Asterids
- Order: Asterales
- Family: Asteraceae
- Subfamily: Asteroideae
- Tribe: Anthemideae
- Genus: Handelia; Heimerl
- Species: H. trichophylla

Binomial name
- Handelia trichophylla (Schrenk) Heimerl

Synonyms
- Achillea trichophylla Schrenk ex Fisch. & C.A.Mey.

= Handelia =

Genus of flowering plants

Handelia is a genus of flowering plants in the daisy family.

The genus is named for Austrian botanist Heinrich von Handel-Mazzetti (1880-1940).

Species

There is only one known species, Handelia trichophylla, native to Asia (Xinjiang, Afghanistan, Kazakhstan, Pakistan, Uzbekistan).
