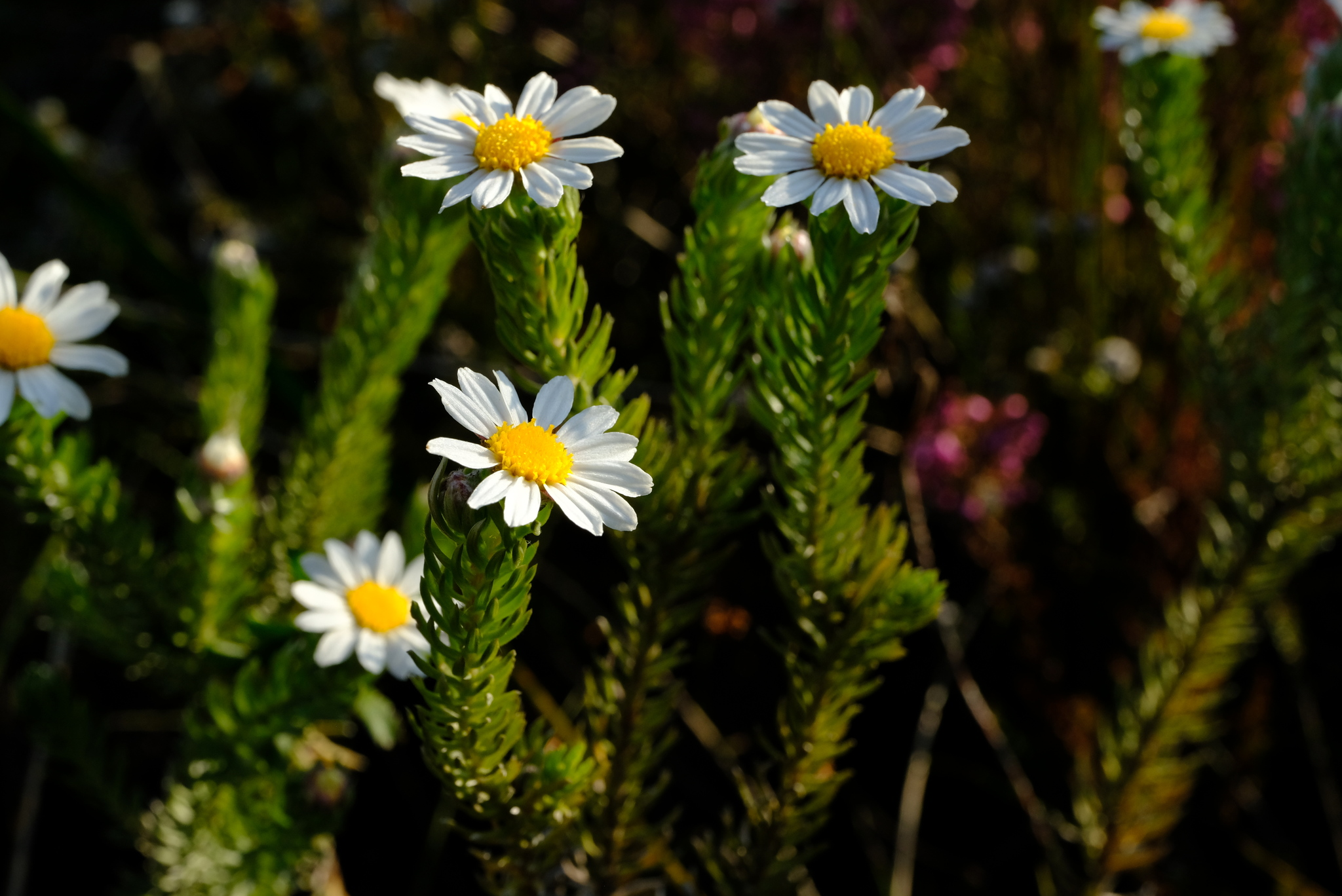
- Thaminophyllum multiflorum

Scientific classification
- Kingdom: Plantae
- Clade: Tracheophytes
- Clade: Angiosperms
- Clade: Eudicots
- Clade: Asterids
- Order: Asterales
- Family: Asteraceae
- Subfamily: Asteroideae
- Tribe: Anthemideae
- Genus: Thaminophyllum; Harv.

Type species
- Thaminophyllum mundii Harv.

= Thaminophyllum =

Genus of plants

Thaminophyllum is a genus of South African plants in the chamomile tribe within the daisy family. It is endemic to the Cape Provinces.

Species

- Thaminophyllum latifolium Bond
- Thaminophyllum multiflorum Harv.
- Thaminophyllum mundii Harv.
