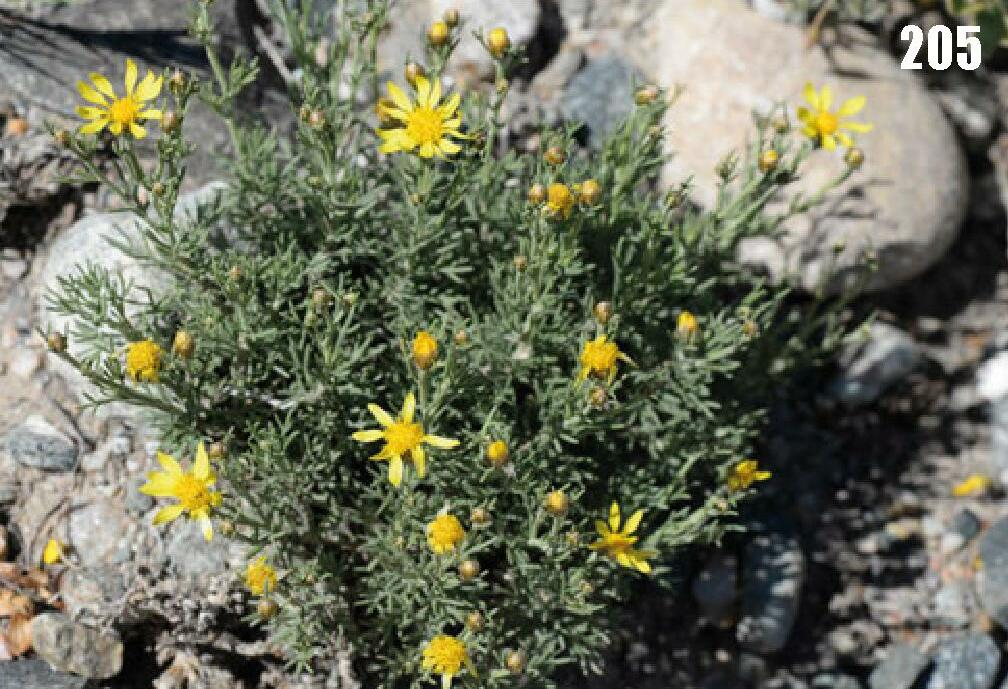
- Brachanthemum kirghisorum

Scientific classification
- Kingdom: Plantae
- Clade: Embryophytes
- Clade: Tracheophytes
- Clade: Angiosperms
- Clade: Eudicots
- Clade: Asterids
- Order: Asterales
- Family: Asteraceae
- Subfamily: Asteroideae
- Tribe: Anthemideae
- Genus: Brachanthemum; DC.

Type species
- Brachanthemum fruticulosum (Ledeb.) DC.

= Brachanthemum =

Genus of flowering plants

Brachanthemum is a genus of flowering plants in the aster family, Asteraceae. They are native to Asia.

Species

- Brachanthemum baranovii - Altay
- Brachanthemum fruticulosum - Siberia (Altay, Buryatiya), Xinjiang, Kazakhstan, Mongolia
- Brachanthemum gobicum - Mongolia
- Brachanthemum kasakhorum - Kazakhstan, Uzbekistan, West Siberia
- Brachanthemum kirghisorum - Altay, Xinjiang, Kazakhstan, Uzbekistan, Kyrgyzstan
- Brachanthemum krylovii - Altay
- Brachanthemum mongolicum - Xinjiang, Kazakhstan, Mongolia
- Brachanthemum mongolorum - Mongolia
- Brachanthemum pulvinatum - Gansu, Inner Mongolia, Xinjiang, Qinghai
- Brachanthemum titovii - Altay, Xinjiang, Kazakhstan, Uzbekistan, Kyrgyzstan
