= Chlamydophora =

Scientific classification
- Kingdom: Plantae
- Clade: Tracheophytes
- Clade: Angiosperms
- Clade: Eudicots
- Clade: Asterids
- Order: Asterales
- Family: Asteraceae
- Subfamily: Asteroideae
- Tribe: Anthemideae
- Genus: Chlamydophora; Ehrenb. ex Less.
- Species: C. tridentata

Binomial name
- Chlamydophora tridentata Ehrenb. ex Less.

Genus of flowering plants

Chlamydophora is a monotypic genus of flowering plants in the aster family, Asteraceae, containing the single species Chlamydophora tridentata. It is native to Tunisia, Libya, Egypt, Greece, and Cyprus.

This species is an annual herb. It has alternately arranged, fleshy leaves, though some of the basal leaves may be opposite. The inflorescence is a solitary flower head with yellow to reddish disc florets. The fruit is a ribbed cypsela about one millimeter long with a large pappus.
