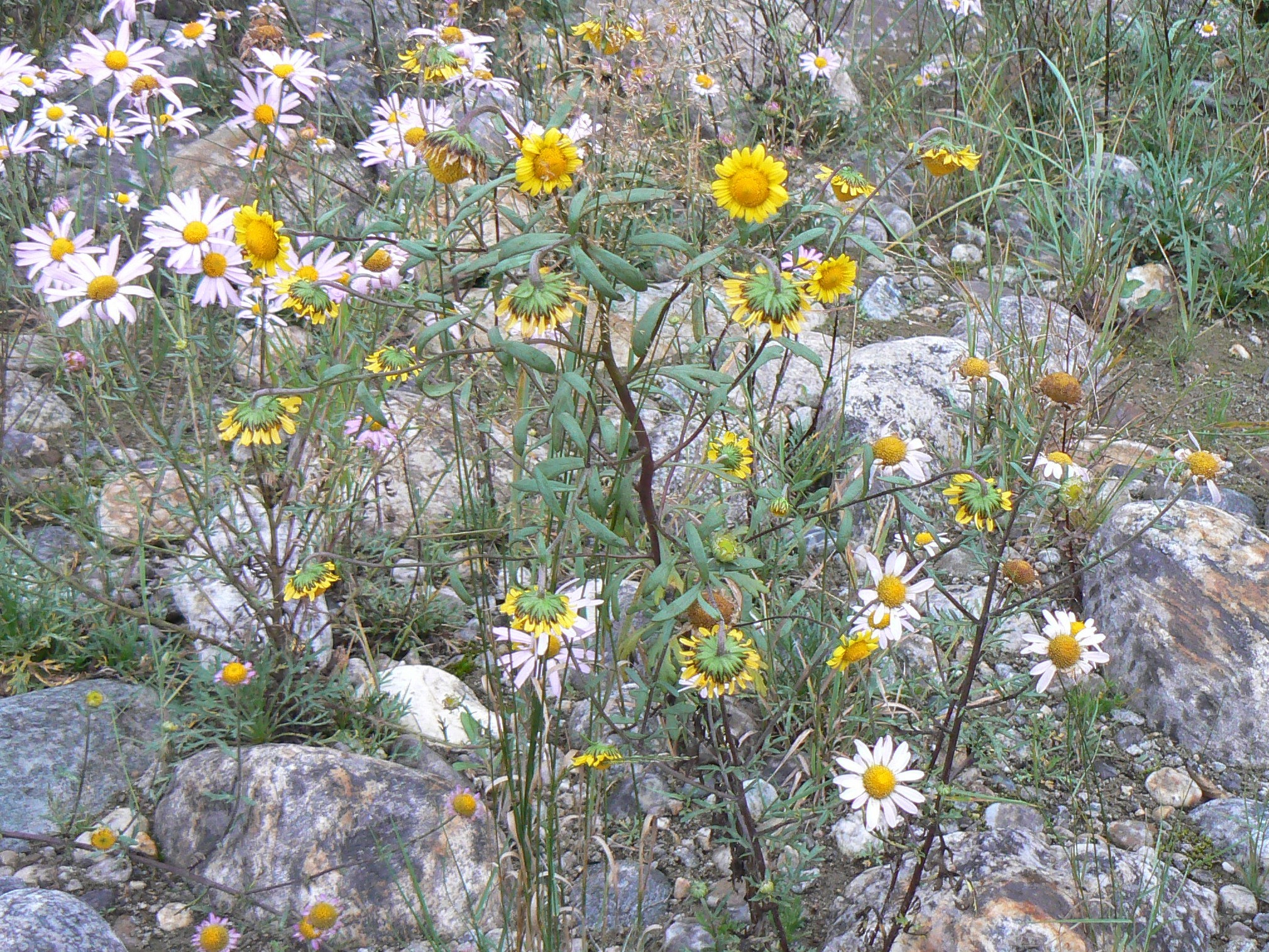
- Tridactylina kirilowii

Scientific classification
- Kingdom: Plantae
- Clade: Tracheophytes
- Clade: Angiosperms
- Clade: Eudicots
- Clade: Asterids
- Order: Asterales
- Family: Asteraceae
- Subfamily: Asteroideae
- Tribe: Anthemideae
- Genus: Tridactylina (DC.) Sch.Bip.
- Species: T. kirilowii

Binomial name
- Tridactylina kirilowii (Turcz.) Sch.Bip.

= Tridactylina =

Genus of flowering plants

Tridactylina is a genus of flowering plants in the chamomile tribe within the daisy family.

Species

The only known species is Tridactylina kirilowii, native to Siberia.
