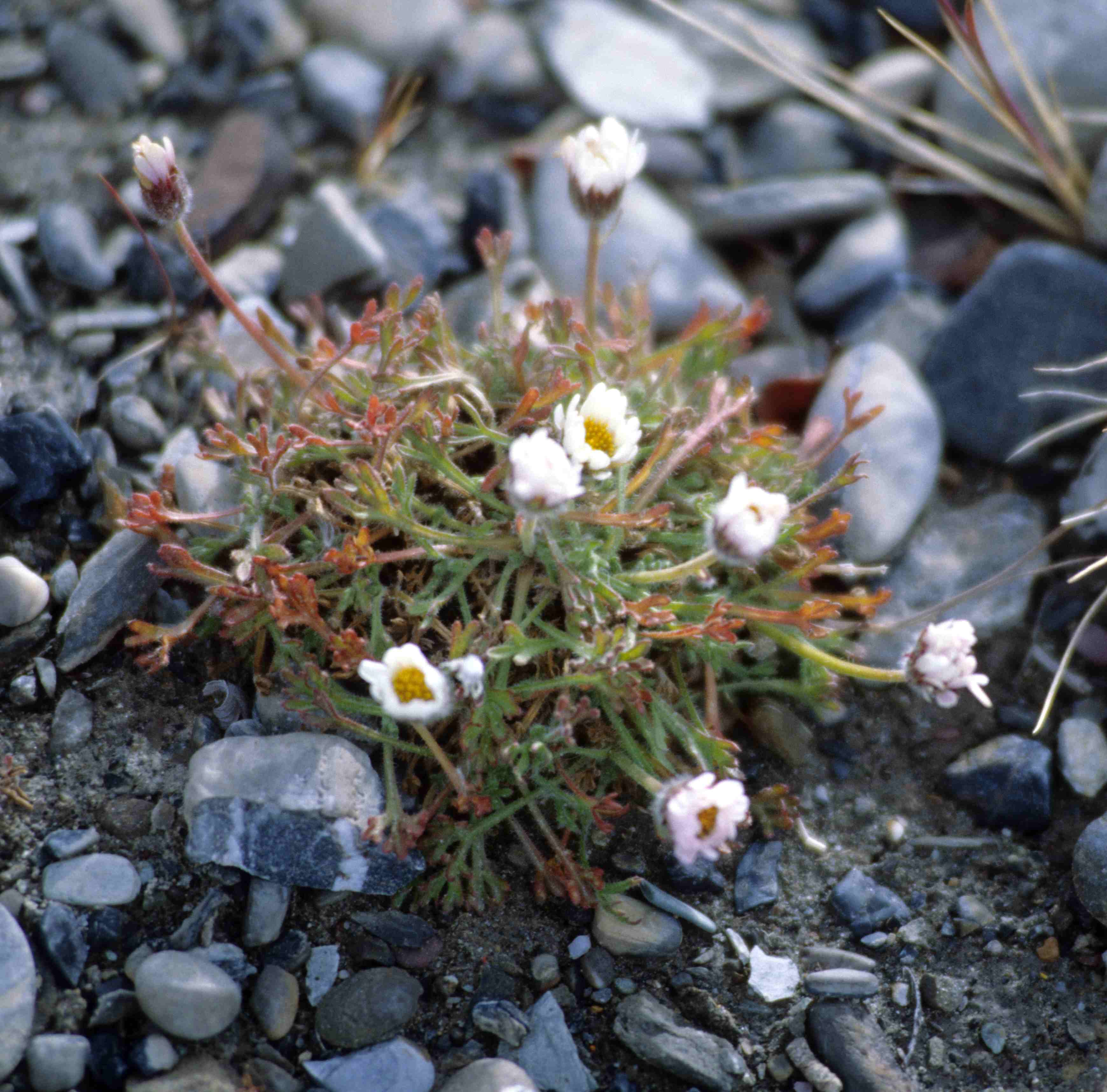
- Chrysanthemum integrifolium 1997-08-05.jpg

Scientific classification
- Kingdom: Plantae
- Clade: Embryophytes
- Clade: Tracheophytes
- Clade: Angiosperms
- Clade: Eudicots
- Clade: Asterids
- Order: Asterales
- Family: Asteraceae
- Subfamily: Asteroideae
- Tribe: Anthemideae
- Genus: Arctanthemum (N.N.Tzvelev) N.N.Tzvelev

Type species
- Arctanthemum arcticum (L.) N.N.Tzvelev

Synonyms
- Dendranthema sect. Arctanthemum Tzvelev; Hulteniella N.N.Tzvelev

= Arctanthemum =

Genus of flowering plants

Arctanthemum is a genus of flowering plants in the daisy family.

Species

- Arctanthemum arcticum (L.) Tzvelev - Russian Far East
- Arctanthemum integrifolium (Richardson) Tzvelev - coastal areas of Russia, Alaska, and Canada (incl Hudson Bay)
- Arctanthemum yezoense (Maekawa) Tzvelev- Japan + Kuril Islands (called Yezo in Japanese, hence the epithet)
