= Mecomischus =

Scientific classification
- Kingdom: Plantae
- Clade: Tracheophytes
- Clade: Angiosperms
- Clade: Eudicots
- Clade: Asterids
- Order: Asterales
- Family: Asteraceae
- Subfamily: Asteroideae
- Tribe: Anthemideae
- Genus: Mecomischus; Coss. ex Benth. & Hook.f.

Type species
- Mecomischus geslini (syn of M. halimifolius) (Coss. & Durieu) B.D.Jacks.

Synonyms
- Fradinia Pomel

Genus of flowering plants

Mecomischus is a genus of North African flowering plants in the chamomile tribe within the daisy family.

Species

- Mecomischus halimifolius (Munby) Hochr. - Morocco, Algeria
- Mecomischus pedunculatus (Coss. & Durieu) Oberpr. & Greuter - Algeria
