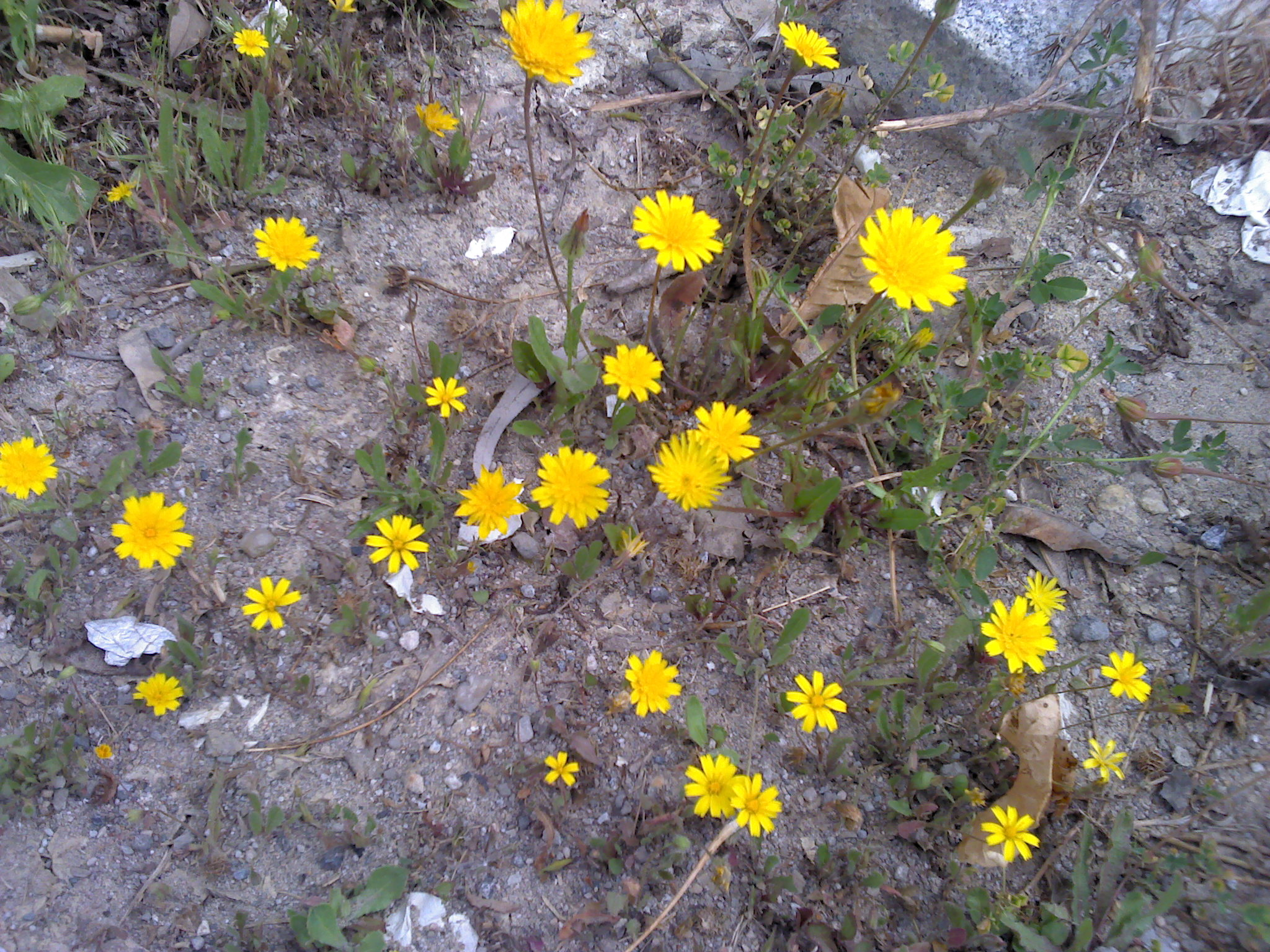

Scientific classification
- Kingdom: Plantae
- Clade: Tracheophytes
- Clade: Angiosperms
- Clade: Eudicots
- Clade: Asterids
- Order: Asterales
- Family: Asteraceae
- Subfamily: Asteroideae
- Tribe: Anthemideae
- Genus: Glossopappus; Kunze
- Species: G. macrotus

Binomial name
- Glossopappus macrotus (Durieu) Briq. & Cavill.

Synonyms
- Chrysanthemum macrotum (Durieu) Ball; Glossopappus macrotus var. discolor Maire; Coleostephus macrotus Durieu; Glossopappus macrotus var. concolor Maire; Coleostephus macrotus Durand; Glossopappus macrotus subsp. chrysanthemoides Maire; Glossopappus macrotus var. chrysanthemoides (Kunze) Maire; Leucanthemum macrotum (Durieu) Heywood; Glossopappus chrysanthemoides Kunze

= Glossopappus =

Genus of flowering plants

Glossopappus is a genus of flowering plants in the daisy family.

Species

There is only one known species, Glossopappus macrotus, native to the western Mediterranean (Algeria, Morocco, Tunisia, Spain, Portugal)
