= Castrilanthemum =

Scientific classification
- Kingdom: Plantae
- Clade: Tracheophytes
- Clade: Angiosperms
- Clade: Eudicots
- Clade: Asterids
- Order: Asterales
- Family: Asteraceae
- Subfamily: Asteroideae
- Tribe: Anthemideae
- Genus: Castrilanthemum; Vogt & Oberpr.
- Species: C. debeauxii

Binomial name
- Castrilanthemum debeauxii (Degen, Hervier & E.Rev.) Vogt & Oberpr.

Genus of flowering plants

Castrilanthemum is a genus of flowering plants belonging to the family Asteraceae. It contains a single species, Castrilanthemum debeauxii.

Its native range is Spain.
