= Xylanthemum =

Scientific classification
- Kingdom: Plantae
- Clade: Embryophytes
- Clade: Tracheophytes
- Clade: Angiosperms
- Clade: Eudicots
- Clade: Asterids
- Order: Asterales
- Family: Asteraceae
- Subfamily: Asteroideae
- Tribe: Anthemideae
- Genus: Xylanthemum; Tzvelev

Type species
- Xylanthemum fisherae (Aitch. & Hemsl.) Tzvelev

Synonyms
- Tanacetum sect. Xylanthemum (Tzvelev) Podlech

Genus of flowering plants

Xylanthemum is a genus of Asian plants in the daisy family.

Species

- Xylanthemum fisherae (Aitch. & Hemsl.) Tzvelev - Uzbekistan, Kyrgyzstan, Tajikistan, Afghanistan
- Xylanthemum gilletii (Podlech) K.Bremer & Humphries - Iran
- Xylanthemum lingulatum (Boiss.) K.Bremer & Humphries - Iran
- Xylanthemum macropodum (Hemsl. & Lace) K.Bremer & Humphries - Pakistan
- Xylanthemum paghmanense (Podlech) K.Bremer & Humphries - Afghanistan
- Xylanthemum pamiricum (O.Hoffm.) Tzvelev - Uzbekistan, Kyrgyzstan, Tajikistan, Afghanistan, Iran
- Xylanthemum polycladum (Rech.f.) Tzvelev
- Xylanthemum rupestre (Popov ex Nevski) Tzvelev - Uzbekistan, Kyrgyzstan, Tajikistan, Afghanistan
- Xylanthemum tianschanicum (Krasch.) Muradyan - Tian Shan Mountains in Kashmir, Pakistan, Tajikistan, Kyrgyzstan
