= Ajaniopsis =

Scientific classification
- Kingdom: Plantae
- Clade: Tracheophytes
- Clade: Angiosperms
- Clade: Eudicots
- Clade: Asterids
- Order: Asterales
- Family: Asteraceae
- Subfamily: Asteroideae
- Tribe: Anthemideae
- Genus: Ajaniopsis; C.Shih
- Species: A. penicilliformis

Binomial name
- Ajaniopsis penicilliformis C.Shih

Genus of flowering plants

Ajaniopsis is a genus of flowering plants in the daisy family described as a genus in 1978.

There is only one known species, Ajaniopsis penicilliformis, endemic to Tibet.
