= Opisthopappus =

Scientific classification
- Kingdom: Plantae
- Clade: Tracheophytes
- Clade: Angiosperms
- Clade: Eudicots
- Clade: Asterids
- Order: Asterales
- Family: Asteraceae
- Subfamily: Asteroideae
- Tribe: Anthemideae
- Genus: Opisthopappus; C.Shih

Type species
- Opisthopappus taihangensis (Ling) C.Shih

Genus of flowering plants

Opisthopappus is a genus of Chinese flowering plants in the chamomile tribe within the daisy family.

Species

- Opisthopappus longilobus - Hebei
- Opisthopappus taihangensis - Hebei, Henan, Shanxi
