= Vogtia (plant) =

Scientific classification
- Kingdom: Plantae
- Clade: Tracheophytes
- Clade: Angiosperms
- Clade: Eudicots
- Clade: Asterids
- Order: Asterales
- Family: Asteraceae
- Subfamily: Asteroideae
- Tribe: Anthemideae
- Subtribe: Vogtiinae; Oberpr. & Töpfer
- Genus: Vogtia; Oberpr. & Sonboli

Species
- Vogtia annua (L.) Oberpr. & Sonboli; Vogtia microphylla (DC.) Oberpr. & Sonboli

Genus of flowering plants

Vogtia is a genus of flowering plants in the family Asteraceae. It is the sole genus in subtribe Vogtiinae. It includes two species native to the western Mediterranean, ranging from France through Spain and Portugal to Morocco.

- Vogtia annua (L.) Oberpr. & Sonboli
- Vogtia microphylla (DC.) Oberpr. & Sonboli
