= Mausolea eriocarpa =

Scientific classification
- Kingdom: Plantae
- Clade: Tracheophytes
- Clade: Angiosperms
- Clade: Eudicots
- Clade: Asterids
- Order: Asterales
- Family: Asteraceae
- Subfamily: Asteroideae
- Tribe: Anthemideae
- Genus: Mausolea; P.P.Poljakov
- Species: M. eriocarpa

Binomial name
- Mausolea eriocarpa (Bunge) P.P.Poljakov

Synonyms
- Artemisia eriocarpa Bunge

Species of plant

Mausolea is a genus of flowering plants in the chamomile tribe within the daisy family.

== Species ==
There is only one known species, Mausolea eriocarpa, native to Kazakhstan, Turkmenistan, Uzbekistan, Afghanistan, and Iran.
