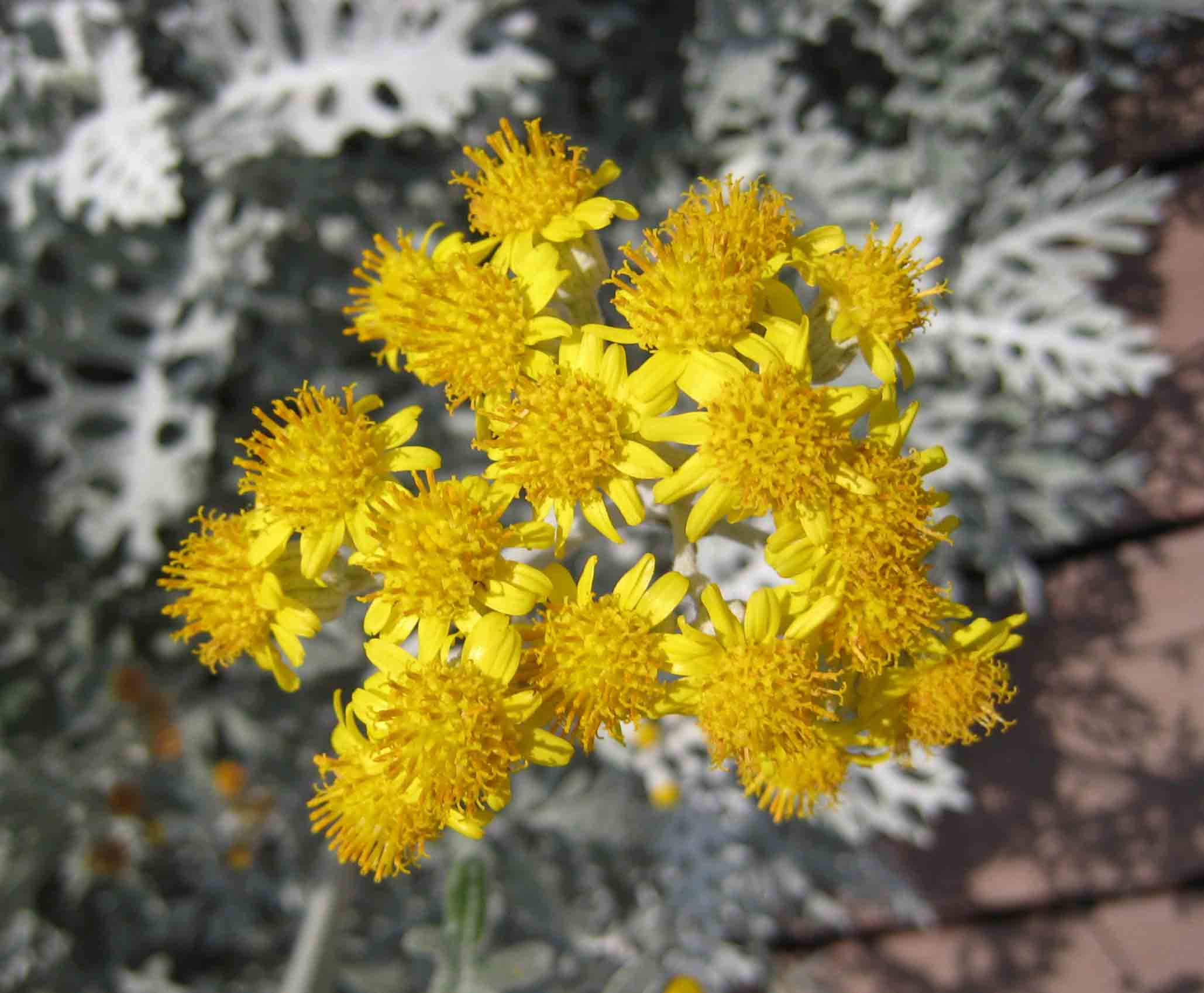

Scientific classification
- Kingdom: Plantae
- Clade: Tracheophytes
- Clade: Angiosperms
- Clade: Eudicots
- Clade: Asterids
- Order: Asterales
- Family: Asteraceae
- Subfamily: Asteroideae
- Tribe: Anthemideae
- Genus: Crossostephium; Less.
- Species: C. chinense

Binomial name
- Crossostephium chinense (A.Gray ex L.) Makino

= Crossostephium =

Genus of flowering plants

Crossostephium is a monotypic genus of flowering plants in the family Asteraceae. The only species is Crossostephium chinense native to parts of Japan (Kazan-retto, Nansei-shoto), Taiwan, Guangdong, Indochina, Peninsular Malaysia, and the Philippines.

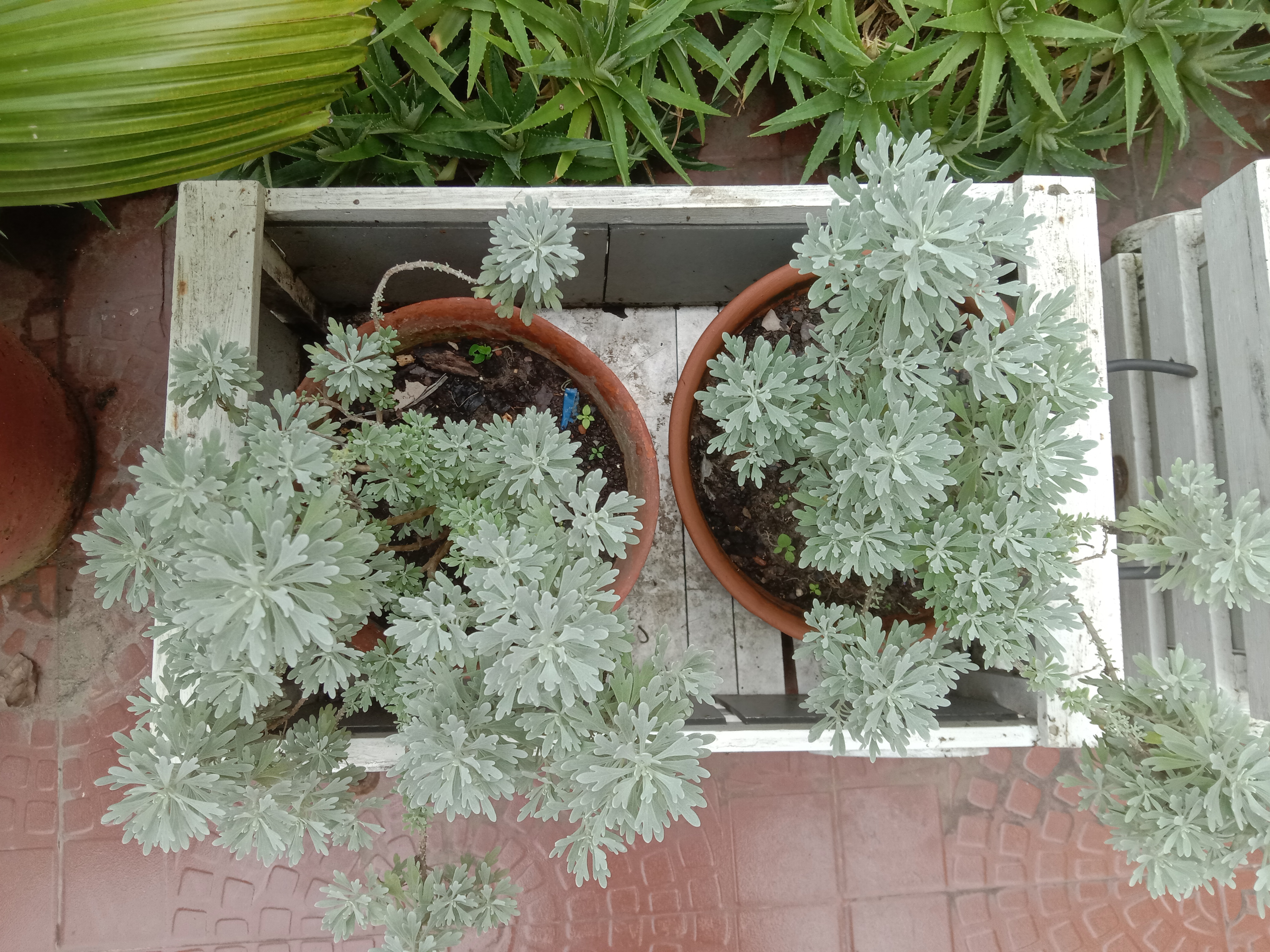
Crossostephium in monsoon, in West Bengal, India.
