= Ugamia =

Scientific classification
- Kingdom: Plantae
- Clade: Tracheophytes
- Clade: Angiosperms
- Clade: Eudicots
- Clade: Asterids
- Order: Asterales
- Family: Asteraceae
- Subfamily: Asteroideae
- Tribe: Anthemideae
- Genus: Ugamia; Pavlov
- Species: U. angrenica

Binomial name
- Ugamia angrenica (Krasch.) Pavlov

Synonyms
- Cancrinia angrenica Krasch.; Ugamia trichanthemoides Pavlov

Genus of flowering plants

Ugamia is a genus of flowering plants in the chamomile tribe within the sunflower family.

There is only one known species, Ugamia angrenica, native to Kazakhstan, Uzbekistan, and Kyrgyzstan.
