= Grigory Karelin =

Russian botanist and explorer (1801–1872)

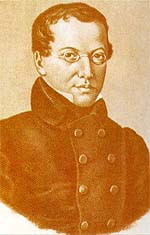

Grigory Silych Karelin (January 1801 – 17 December 1872) was a Russian explorer and naturalist who travelled around Siberia and central Asia. Many species of plants have been described from specimens that he collected and some named in his honour.

Karelin was born in Petersburg district where his father was a music conductor. Orphaned at the age of eight he joined the Cadet Corps, graduating in 1817 as a Second Lieutenant. He wrote some humorous verse on the secretary of war, Count Arakcheev, which led to his being posted in Orenburg on the border of Russia. Here he met E. F. Eversmann and became interested in natural history. He began to collect plants from the Caspian region and sent specimens to other Russian botanists. In 1862, he travelled on the Kirghiz Steppes with Eversmann and in 1829 to the lower Volga along with Christopher Hansteen. In 1834, he established Novo Aleksandrovsk fort in Karasu Bay to keep nomadic raiders away from the Russian station. In 1840, he travelled in the Targatai mountains collecting nearly 38000 botanical specimens. Most of those botanical specimens were described by Ivan Petrovich Kirilov, a young man that he raised from near poverty. After the death of Kirilov by Cholera in 1842, he was driven to depression. Karelin received a pension and awards from the Russian government. He was also gifted a diamond ring by Emperor Nicholas I.

With Ivan Petrovich Kirilov he issued and distributed an exsiccata-like specimen series under the title Soc. Imp. Nat. Cur. Mosqu..
