= Dariya Nikitichna Dobroczajeva =

Ukrainian botanist

- Дарія Микитівна Доброчаєва
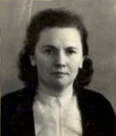
- Born: March 30, 1916; Khyshnyky, Khmelnytskyi Raion, Ukraine
- Died: 1 December 1995 (aged 79); Kyiv, Ukraine
- Education: Ph.D.
- Known for: Spermatophyte
- Awards: State Prize of the Ukrainian SSR for Science and Technology; Honored Worker in Science and Technology of the Ukrainian SSR
- Scientific career
- Fields: Botany
- Institutions: Botanical Museum of the Botanical Institute of the National Academy of Sciences of Ukraine
- Author abbrev. (botany): Dobrocz.

Dariya Nikitichna Dobroczajeva (Ukrainian: Дарія Микитівна Доброчаєва; March 30, 1916, Khyshnyky, now Khmelnytskyi Raion, Khmelnytskyi Oblast, Ukraine – December 1, 1995, Kyiv, Ukraine) was a Ukrainian botanist and university teacher.

== Biography ==
Dobroczajeva was the head of the Botanical Museum of the Botanical Institute of the National Academy of Sciences of Ukraine. She brought back numerous herbarium materials from expeditions in Ukraine and private trips to various countries, donating more than 30,000 herbarium sheets to the Institute of Botany. For a long time, she headed the herbarium exchange fund, significantly expanded her connections to botanical institutions in many countries of Europe, Asia and America, and intensified her work to replenish the world flora collection. Her area of specialty was Spermatophyte.

In 1969, Dobroczajeva was a recipient of the State Prize of the Ukrainian SSR for Science and Technology. In 1982, she received the Honored Worker in Science and Technology of the Ukrainian SSR. The standard author abbreviation Dobrocz. is used to identify that person as the author when citing a botanical name.

== Plants described ==
1. Centaurea alutacea Dobrocz. 1949
2. Centaurea czerkessica Dobrocz. and Kotov, 1962
3. Centaurea nigriceps Dobrocz. 1946
4. Centaurea pseudomaculosa Dobrocz. 1949
5. Centaurea pseudocoriacea Dobrocz. 1949
6. Centaurea ternopoliensis Dobrocz. 1949
7. Anthemis subtinctoria Dobrocz. 1961
8. Anthemis parviceps Dobrocz. and Fed. ex Klokov, 1974
9. Anthemis zephyrovii Dobrocz. 1961
10. Echium popovii Dobrocz. 1977
11. Myosotis popovii Dobrocz. 1957
12. Onosma guberlinensis Dobrocz. and Vinogr. 1966
13. Onosma macrochaetum Klokov and Dobrocz. 1957
14. Onosma volgense Dobrocz. 1977
15. Symphytum popovii Dobrocz. 1968
16. Spiraea litwinowii Dobrocz. 1954
17. Trapa danubialis Dobrocz. 1955
18. Trapa flerovii Dobrocz. 1955
19. Trapa macrorhiza Dobrocz. 1955
20. Helianthemum creticola Klokov and Dobrocz. 1974
21. Helianthemum cretophilum Klokov and Dobrocz. 1974

== Selected works ==
=== Books ===
- Dariya N. Dobrochaeva, I.U.D. Kleopov. 1990. Analiz Flory Shirokolistvennykh Lesov Evropeiskoi Chasti SSSR. 350 pp. ISBN 5-12-000800-3
- Dariya N. Dobrochaeva, G.P. Mokritskii. 1991. Vladimir Ippolitovich Lipskii. 214 pp. ISBN 5-12-001749-5

=== Articles ===
- Zaverukha BV, Ilyinskaya AP, Shevera MV Daryna Mykytivna Dobrochaeva (to the 75th anniversary of her birth), Ukrainian Botanical Journal, 1991, vol. 48, no. 2, pp. 109–110. (in Ukrainian)
- "Wreath of remembrance on the fresh grave of Professor Darina Mykytivna Dobrochaeva", Ukrainian Botanical Journal, 1996. - vol. 53, no. 1–2, pp. 154–61. (in Ukrainian)
- AP Ilyinskaya, VV Protopopova, MV Shever. "The man who did good" (to the 95th anniversary of the birth of Professor Darina Mykytivna Dobrochaeva). Ukrainian Botanical Journal, 2011, vol. 68, no. 3, pp. 475–477. ISSN 0372-4123 (in Ukrainian)
- Ilyinskaya AP, Shevera MV Daryna Mykytivna Dobrochaeva (1916-1995). - K.-Kremenchuk: PP Shcherbatykh, 2006. p. 40. (in Ukrainian)
- Protopopova V., Shevera M. Researcher of flora Professor Daryna Mykytivna Dobrochaeva "Woman in science and education: past, present, future". Mat-li 2 Int. scientific-practical conf. (Kyiv, 2002). - K., 2002, pp. 322–324 (in Ukrainian)
- Shevera MV Dobrochaeva DM, Encyclopedia of modern Ukraine. vol. 8. Dl-Dya. Kyiv: Institute of Encyclopedic Research of the National Academy of Sciences of Ukraine, 2008, p. 128. (in Ukrainian)
- KM Sitnik. "Outstanding women scientists of the Institute of Botany". MG Kholodny National Academy of Sciences of Ukraine, Ukrainian Botanical Journal, 2011, vol. 68, no. 2. ISSN 0372-4123 (in Ukrainian)

== Awards and honours ==
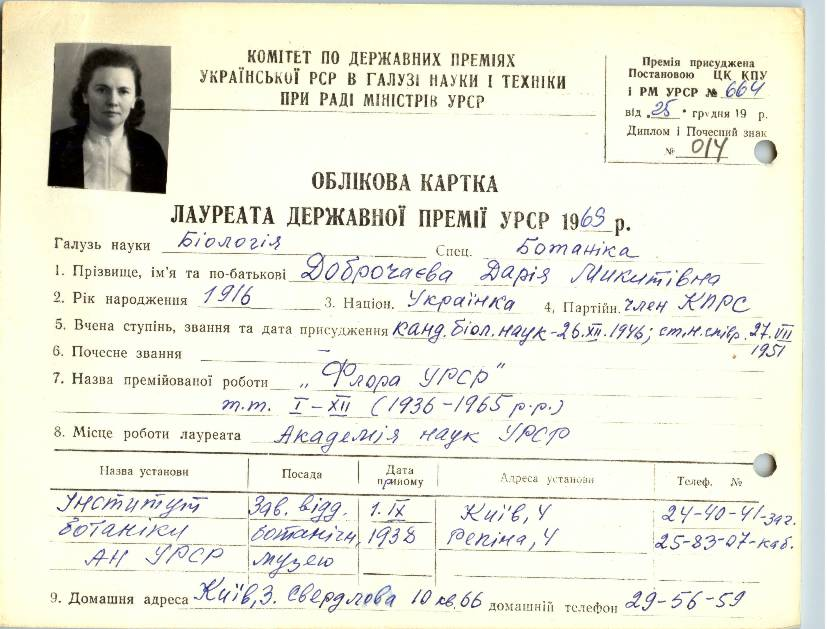
Registration card of the winner of the USSR State Prize

- 1969: State Prize of the Ukrainian SSR for Science and Technology
- 1982: Honored Worker in Science and Technology of the Ukrainian SSR
- The Dobrochaeva Botanical Museum is named after her and is one of the five exhibitions of the National Museum of Science and Natural History of the National Academy of Sciences of Ukraine, housed in the National Museum of Natural History.

== Honoring the memory ==
The botanical exposition of the National Museum of Natural History, which was organized by D.M. Dobroczajeva, is now named after her — the D.M. Dobroczajeva Botanical Museum.

The species Centaurea × dobroczaevae Tzvelev was named in honor of the scientist (currently has an indeterminate status in The Plant List database).
