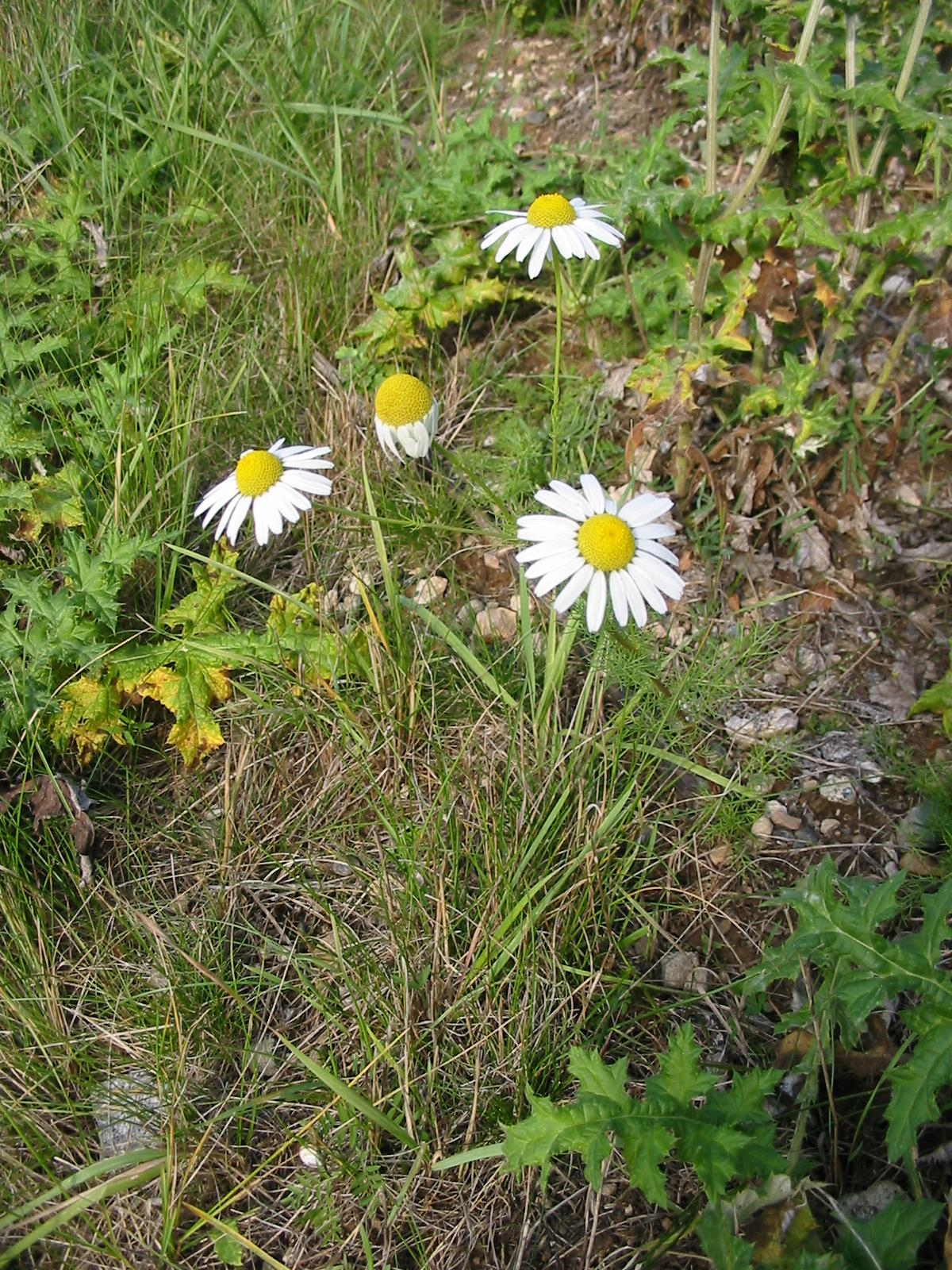

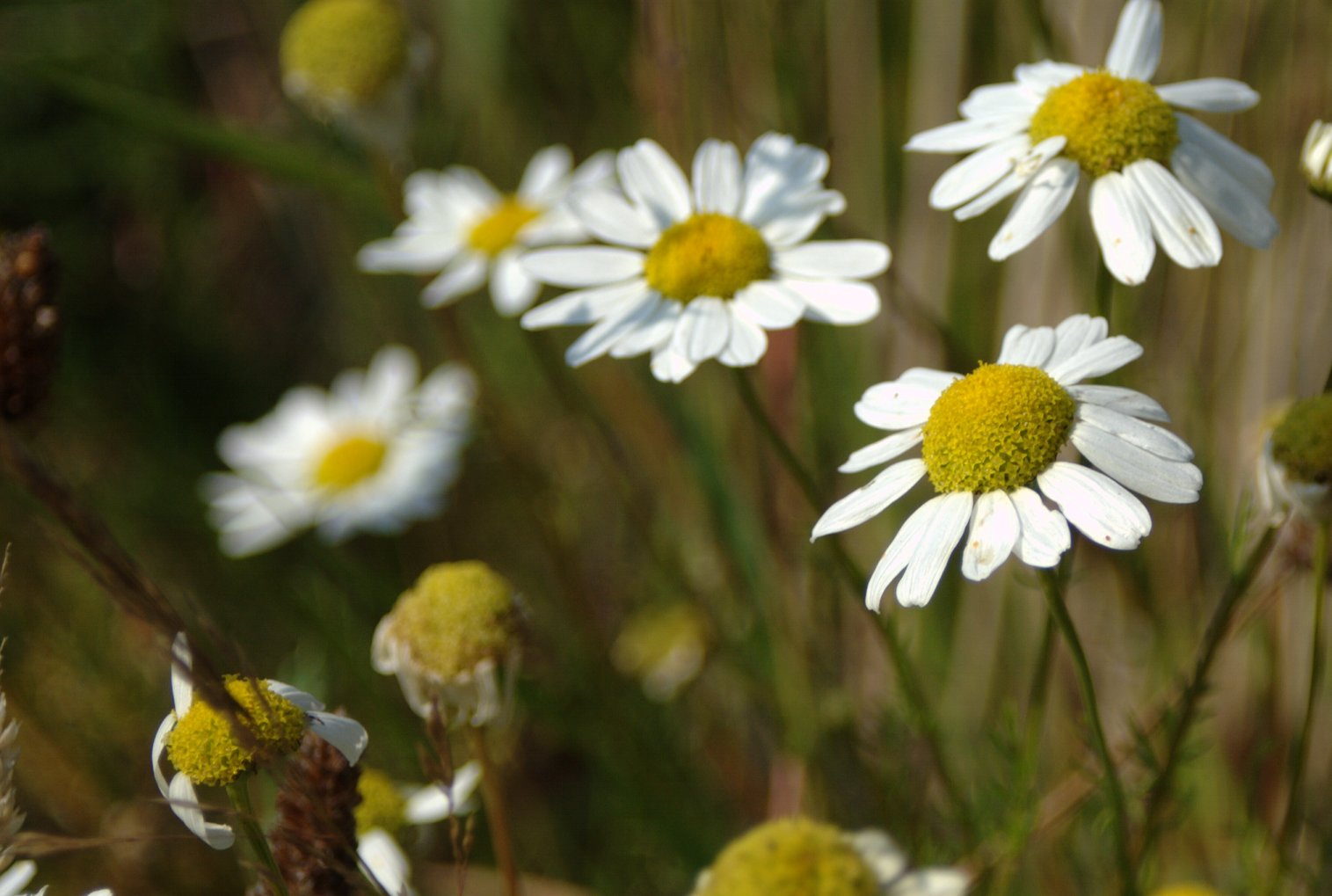

Scientific classification
- Kingdom: Plantae
- Clade: Embryophytes
- Clade: Tracheophytes
- Clade: Spermatophytes
- Clade: Angiosperms
- Clade: Eudicots
- Clade: Asterids
- Order: Asterales
- Family: Asteraceae
- Genus: Tripleurospermum
- Species: T. inodorum

Binomial name
- Tripleurospermum inodorum (L.) Sch.Bip.

Synonyms
- Matricaria inodora L.; Matricaria perforata Mérat; Tripleurospermum perforatum (Mérat) M.Laínz; Tripleurospermum inodorum; Matricaria maritima subsp. inodorum; Tripleurospermum maritimum subsp. inodorum (L.) Hyl. ex Vaar.

= Tripleurospermum inodorum =

Species of flowering plant

Tripleurospermum inodorum, common names scentless false mayweed, scentless mayweed, scentless chamomile, and Baldr's brow, is the type species of Tripleurospermum. This plant is native to Eurasia, and introduced to North America, where it is commonly found in fields, fallow land and gardens.

== Description ==
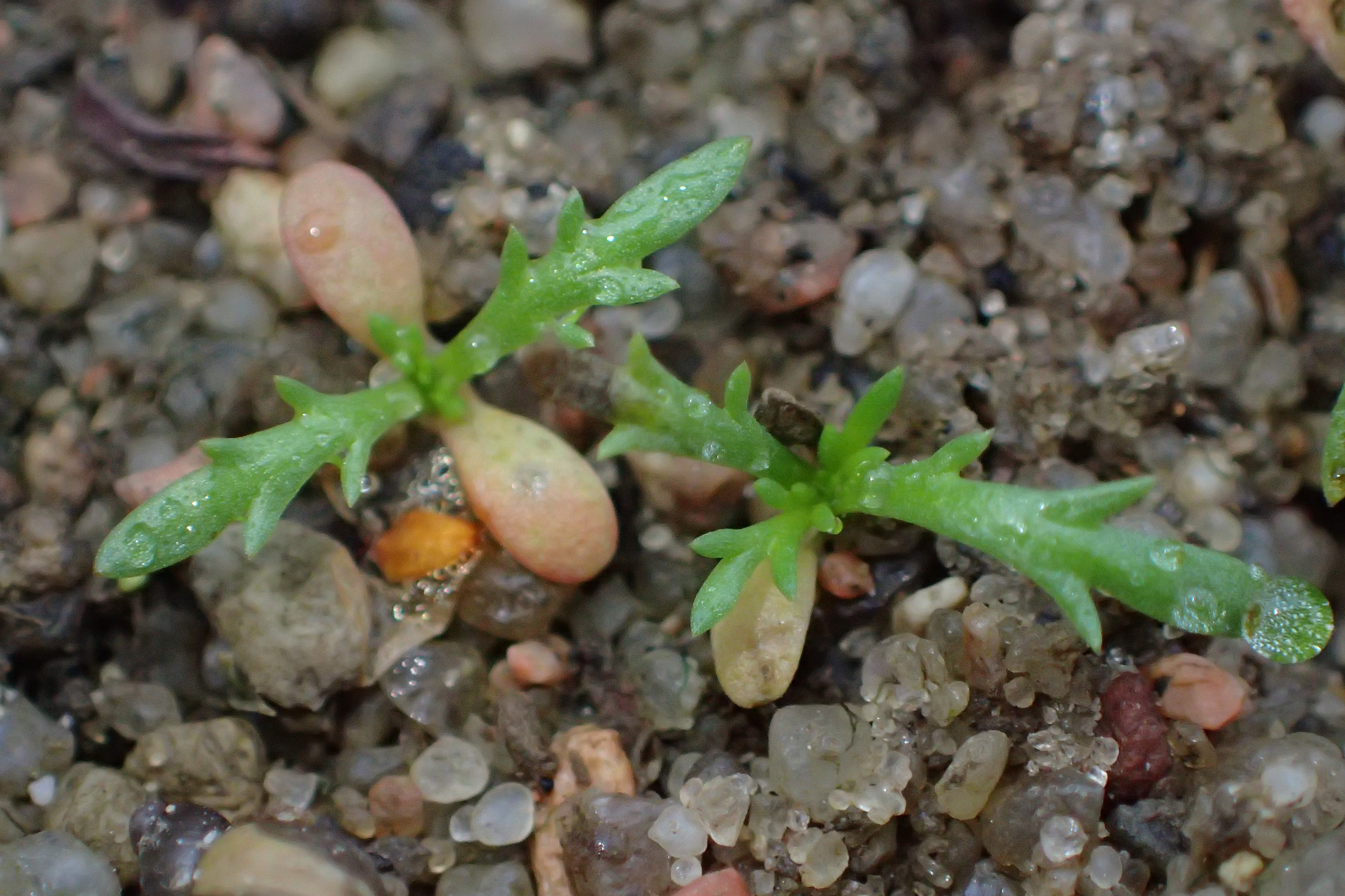
Cotyledons

The species may grow to be 20–80 cm (7.9–31.5 in) in height. It is usually 1-stemmed, with the stem erect–ascending, branching, glabrous, green. Stems are single, erect, branched in the upper plant, weakly ridged or lined, hairless though sparsely hairy when young.

Leaves are alternate, short-stalked–stalkless. The blade is 2–3 times pinnately lobed (–with leaflets), glabrous, lobes (or leaflets) long, thread-like narrow, sharp-pointed. Leaves are ¾ to 3 inches long, feathery with a few to numerous thread-like branching lobes. The cotyledons are oribicular to oblong, very small, 3 to 5 mm long, and stalkless.

Flowers are single flower-like, usually with a 3–5 cm (1.2–2.0 in) capitula, surrounded by involucral bracts. The capitula's ray-florets are white, tongue-like, tip shallowly 3-toothed; disc florets are yellow, tubular, small. Stamens 5. Pistil of 2 fused carpels. Involucral bracts are of different lengths, 1–1.5 mm (0.039–0.059 in) broad, light brown–white margins. Disc is stacked, full. Capitula is 1–20 borne in a corymbose cluster. It flowers from June–October. Pollen is collected by solitary bees.

The fruit is a flattish, ridged achene, with 2 round–angular oil spots, tip sometimes with small, membranous ring.

=== Similar species ===
Tripleurospermum maritimum (false mayweed) is morphologically similar to T. inodorum. False mayweed achenes are a similar size, brown colour, and rectangular shape as scentless chamomile. The rib arrangement and the resin glands are also similar to scentless chamomile. False mayweed achenes usually have less space between the ribs, the resin glands cannot be seen from the top of the achene, and the resin glands are often brown and oval rather than round and reddish compared to scentless chamomile.

== Taxonomy ==
Historically included in the genus Matricaria, Tripleurospermum inodorum has been the subject of some controversy, with many revisions in recent years. The Flora Europaea uses Matricaria perforata for this species. Synonyms/other scientific names include Tripleurospermum perforatum and Tripleurospermum maritimum subsp. inodorum.

W. L. Applequist (2002) has shown that the name Matricaria inodora is not a superfluous new name for M. chamomilla as earlier stated by S. Rauschert (1974). Therefore, the appropriate name under Tripleurospermum is T. inodorum. She also considered its type to belong in T. maritimum and formally recognized it there as subsp. inodorum, on the basis of hybridization with other T. maritimum subspecies (A. Vaarama 1953); on the same basis, however, Hämet-Ahti maintained the species distinction between T. inodorum and T. maritimum, while making T. phaeocephalum a subspecies of the latter.

Tripleurospermum inodorum hybridizes with Cota tinctoria to form the hybrid × Tripleurocota sulfurea.

== Ecology ==
T. inodorum grows in fields, fallow land, lawns, wasteland, roadsides, yards, gardens. It is an annual or short-lived perennial. It is native to Eurasia.

Tripleurospermum inodorum has been classified as a noxious weed (class C) in the state of Washington and is considered invasive in other states (it is resistant to some herbicides); it is a weed of cereals in western Canada. According to Canadian regulations, it is classified as Secondary Noxious, Class 3 and Noxious, Class 5 in the Canadian Weed Seeds Order, 2016 under the Seeds Act.

== Mythology ==
In Sweden and Norway, it is called Baldr's brow, but in Iceland, it is the close relative sea mayweed (Matricaria maritima) that carries this name. In Gylfaginning, Snorri Sturluson explains that the name Balder's brow comes from the plants' whiteness:

Annarr sonr Óðins er Baldr, ok er frá honum gott at segja. Hann er beztr, ok hann lofa allir. Hann er svá fagr álitum ok bjartr, svá at lýsir af honum, ok eitt gras er svá hvítt, at jafnat er til Baldrs brár. Þat er allra grasa hvítast, ok þar eftir máttu marka fegurð hans bæði á hár ok á líki. Hann er vitrastr ásanna ok fegrst talaðr ok líknsamastr, en sú náttúra fylgir honum, at engi má haldast dómr hans. Hann býr þar, sem heitir Breiðablik. Þat er á himni. Í þeim stað má ekki vera óhreint[.]	The second son of Odin is Baldr, and good things are to be said of him. He is best, and all praise him; he is so fair of feature, and so bright, that light shines from him. A certain herb is so white that it is likened to Baldr's brow; of all grasses it is whitest, and by it thou mayest judge his fairness, both in hair and in body. He is the wisest of the Æsir, and the fairest-spoken and most gracious; and that quality attends him, that none may gainsay his judgments. He dwells in the place called Breidablik, which is in heaven; in that place may nothing unclean be[.]
