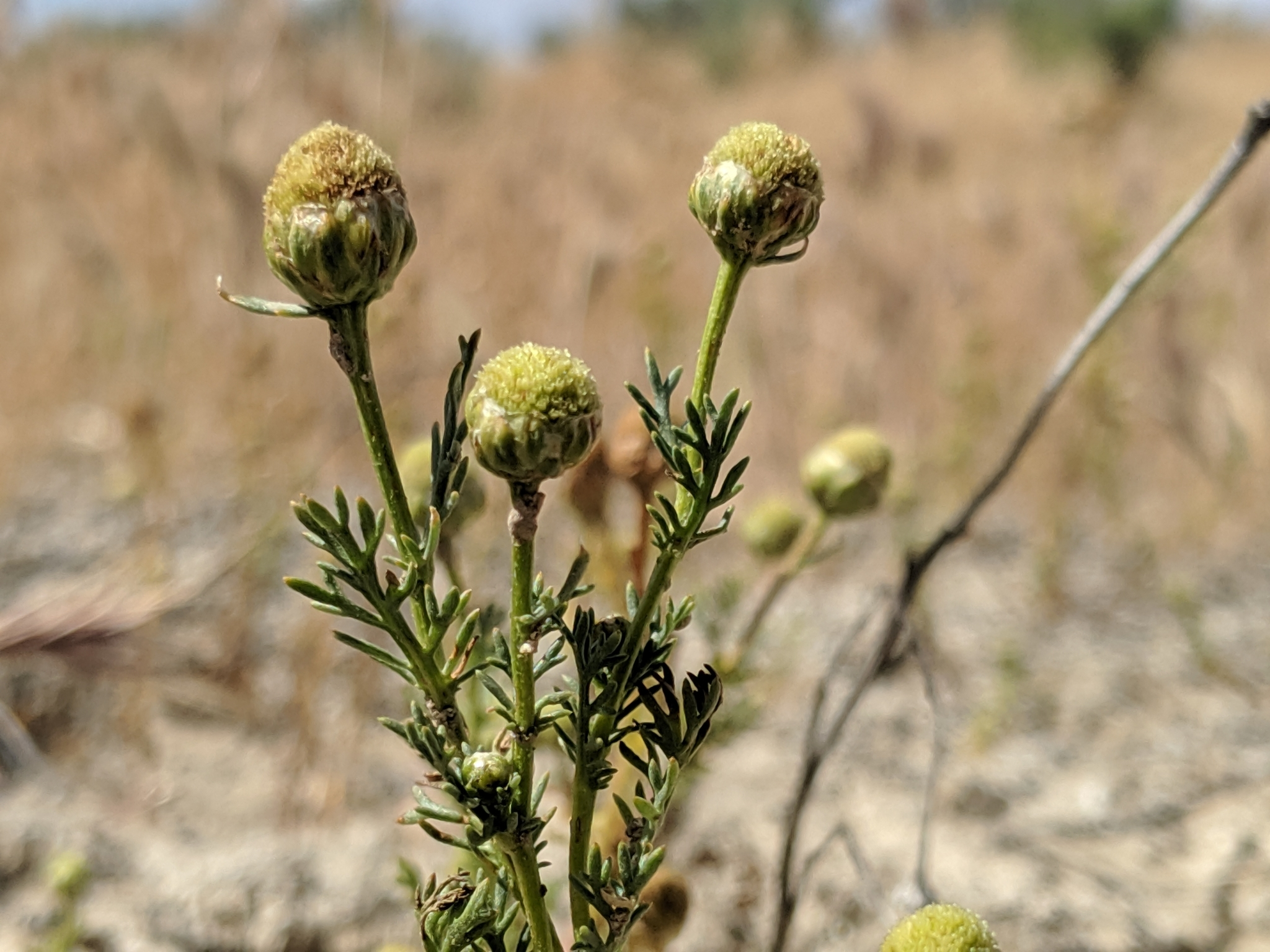
- Matricaria occidentalis

Scientific classification
- Kingdom: Plantae
- Clade: Tracheophytes
- Clade: Angiosperms
- Clade: Eudicots
- Clade: Asterids
- Order: Asterales
- Family: Asteraceae
- Genus: Matricaria
- Species: M. occidentalis

Binomial name
- Matricaria occidentalis (Greene) Rydb.

Synonyms
- Chamomilla occidentalis Greene

= Matricaria occidentalis =

Species of flowering plant

Matricaria occidentalis, commonly known as valley mayweed, is an annual plant native to North America. It is in the family Asteraceae.

== Description ==
The stem is either branching or below the corymbose summit. It is 15–45 cm (5.9–17.7 in) high; not strongly scented; heads as much as 1.5 cm (0.59 in) in diameter, conical in shape and greenish yellow in color; achenes are sharply angled. It is used as substitute for chamomile. It is extremely similar to pineapple weed.

== Distribution and habitat ==
Usually occurs in wetlands, but occasionally found in non wetlands. It is native to California and Oregon.
