= Romaška =

- Lithuanian surname
- m.: Romaška
- f.: (unmarried): Romaškaitė
- f.: (married): Romaškienė
- Related names: Ramaška; Ramoška

Romaška is a Lithuanian language family name, which comes from mayweed (Lithuanian: Ramunė; Russian: Ромашка, Romashka). It may refer to:

- Gediminas Romaška (born 1955), Lithuanian politician
- Nijolė Romaškienė (born 1955), Lithuanian politician
- Giedrė Romaškienė (born 1980), Lithuanian school headmaster
- Petras Romaška (born 1979), Works in Lithuanian army.
