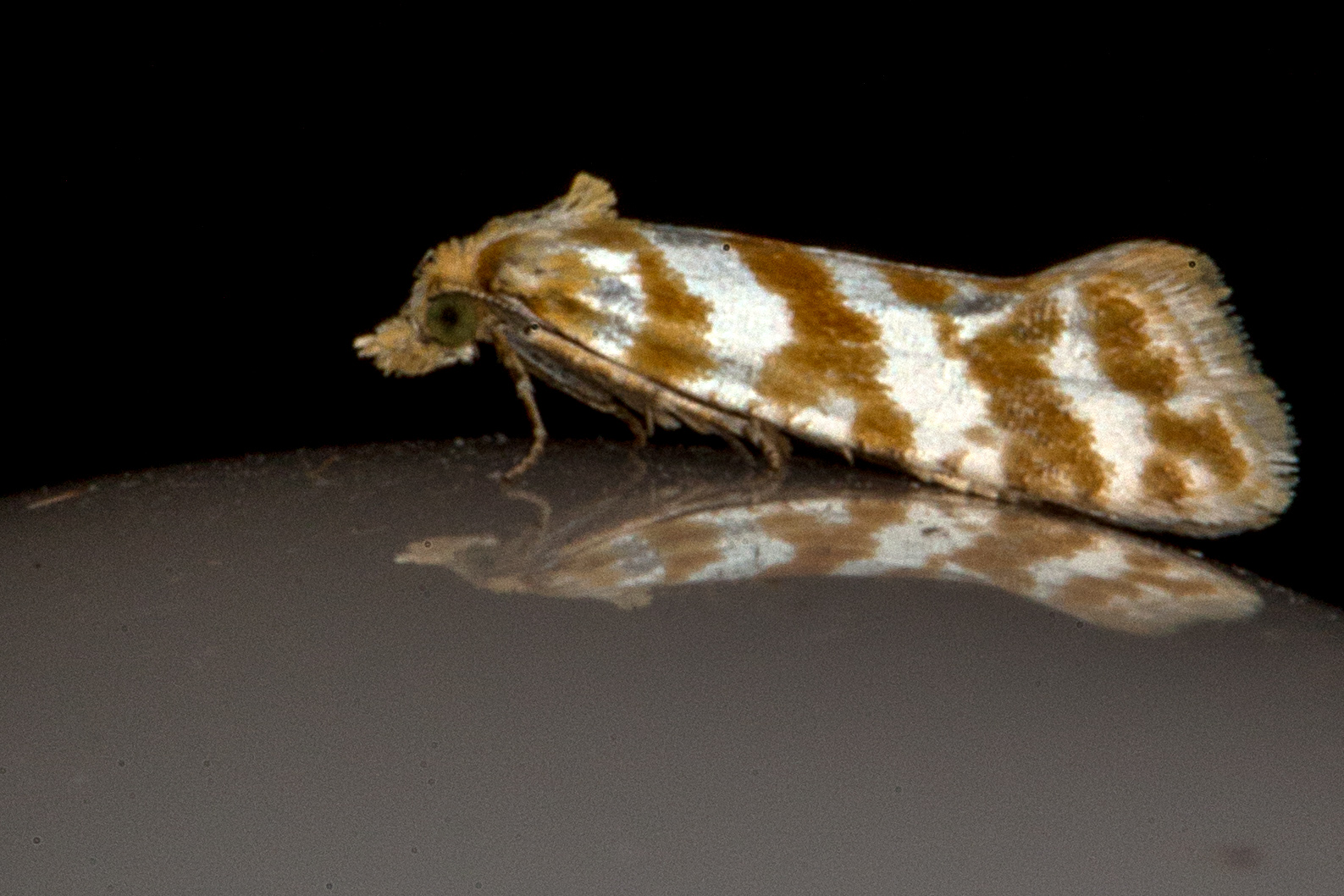

Scientific classification
- Kingdom: Animalia
- Phylum: Arthropoda
- Clade: Pancrustacea
- Class: Insecta
- Order: Lepidoptera
- Family: Tortricidae
- Genus: Aethes
- Species: A. margaritana

Binomial name
- Aethes margaritana (Haworth, [1811])

Synonyms
- Tortrix margaritana Haworth, [1811]; Tinea dipoltella Hübner, [1810-1813]; Phalonia dipoltella f. rubiginosella Dufrane, 1955

= Aethes margaritana =

Species of moth

Aethes margaritana, the silver coast conch, is a moth of the family Tortricidae. It was described by Adrian Hardy Haworth in 1811. It is found in most of Europe. The habitat consists of downland, waste ground and shingle beaches.

The wingspan is 12–16 millimetres (0.47–0.63 in). They are on wing from May to June and again from July to August in two generations per year.

The larvae feed on Chrysanthemum, Tanacetum, Achillea, Matricaria and Chamomilla species. They live in the flowers and seeds of their host plant. The species overwinters and pupates in the larval habitation during spring.
