= T. maritimum =

T. maritimum may refer to:

- Triglochin maritimum, an arrowgrass species found in brackish marshes, freshwater marshes, wet sandy beaches, fens and damp grassland
- Tripleurospermum maritimum, the sea mayweed, a plant species

== See also ==
- Maritimum (disambiguation)
