= Matricaria suaveolens =

Matricaria suaveolens may refer to:

- Matricaria suaveolens L. = Matricaria chamomilla L.
- Matricaria suaveolens (Pursh) Buchenau, non L. = Matricaria discoidea DC.
