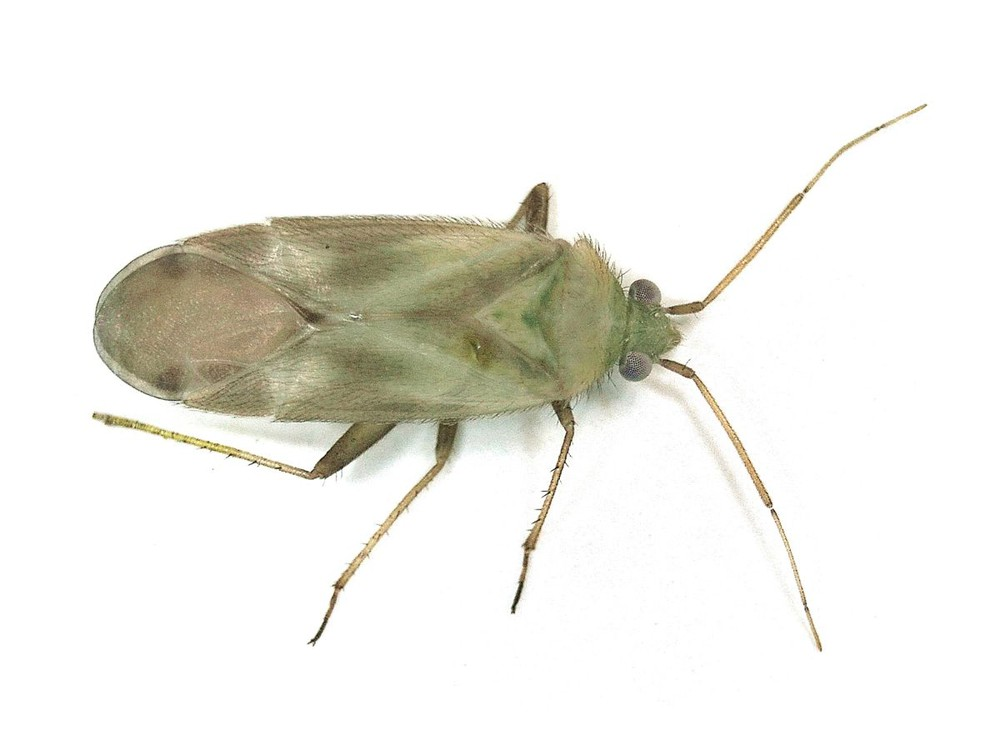

Scientific classification
- Kingdom: Animalia
- Phylum: Arthropoda
- Class: Insecta
- Order: Hemiptera
- Suborder: Heteroptera
- Family: Miridae
- Genus: Megalocoleus
- Species: M. molliculus

Binomial name
- Megalocoleus molliculus (Fallén, 1807)

= Megalocoleus molliculus =

Species of true bug

Megalocoleus molliculus is a species of plant bug in the family Miridae. It is found in Europe and east through the Palearctic to Siberia (excluding China). It also occurs in North America.

M. molliculus lives mainly on yarrow Achillea millefolium, more rarely also on tansy Tanacetum vulgare and other Compositae (Asteraceae) such as chamomile Matricaria, Artemisia and dog chamomile Anthemis. The adult bugs occur from late June to mid-September. The females pierce their eggs in the upper parts of the stems of their host plants.
