= × Tripleurocota =

Scientific classification
- Kingdom: Plantae
- Clade: Embryophytes
- Clade: Tracheophytes
- Clade: Angiosperms
- Clade: Eudicots
- Clade: Asterids
- Order: Asterales
- Family: Asteraceae
- Genus: × Tripleurocota; Starm.
- Species: × T. sulfurea

Binomial name
- × Tripleurocota sulfurea (P.Fourn.) Starm.

Synonyms
- × Anthemi-matricaria sulfurea P.Fourn.

Monotypic hybrid genus of flowering plant

× Tripleurocota is a monotypic hybrid genus (nothogenus) in the family Asteraceae. Its only species is × Tripleurocota sulfurea, previously known as × Anthemi-matricaria sulfurea. Its native range is France and Yugoslavia. The species is a cross between Cota tinctoria and Tripleurospermum inodorum. The nothogenus was established in 2005 by Walter Karl Starmühler.
