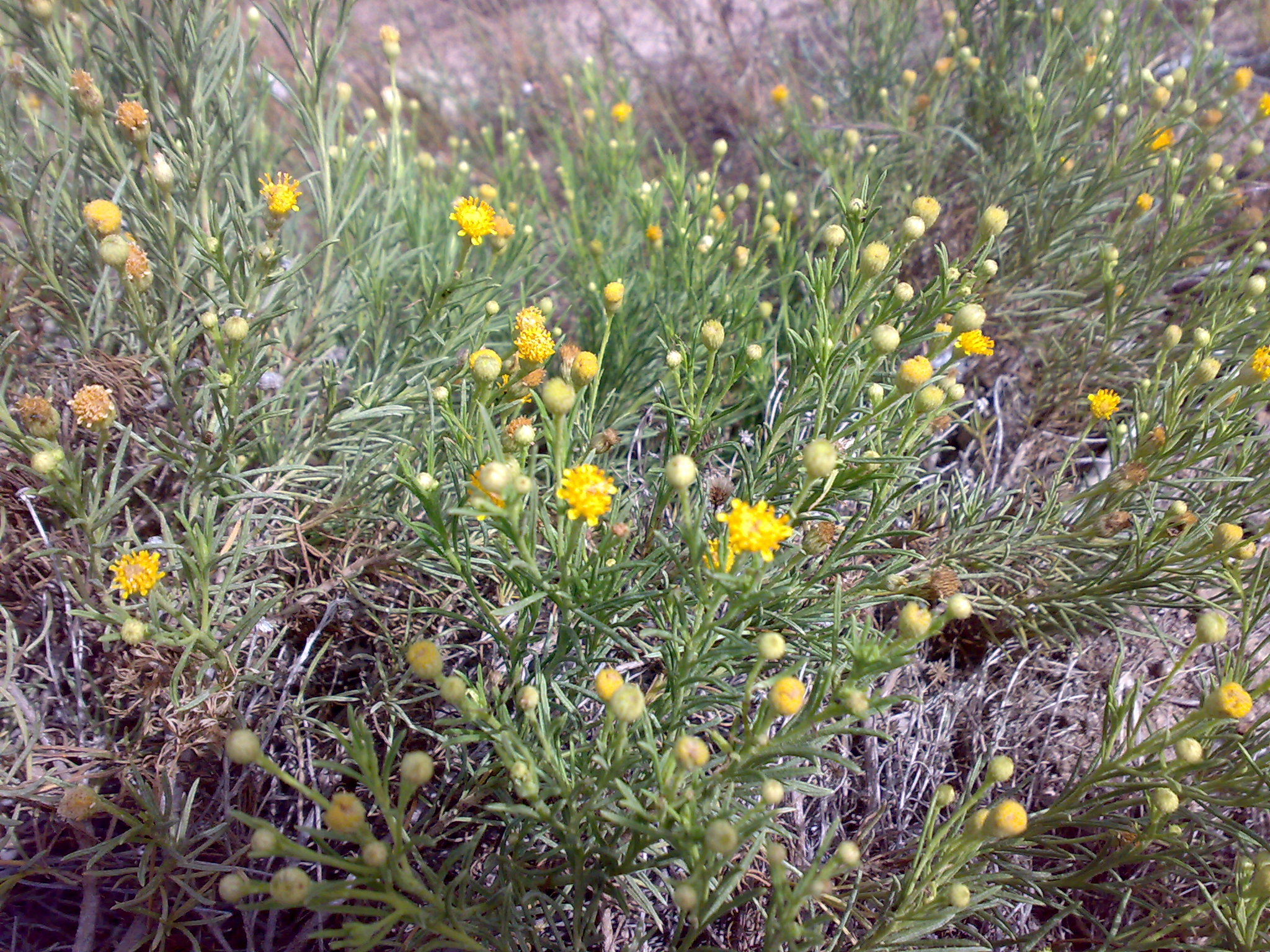

Scientific classification
- Kingdom: Plantae
- Clade: Tracheophytes
- Clade: Angiosperms
- Clade: Eudicots
- Clade: Asterids
- Order: Asterales
- Family: Asteraceae
- Genus: Matricaria
- Species: M. aurea

Binomial name
- Matricaria aurea (L.) Sch. Bip.

Synonyms
- Chamomilla aurea

= Matricaria aurea =

Species of plant

Matricaria aurea is a species of plants in the family Asteraceae.

== Sources ==
This article incorporates text from a free content work. Licensed under CC0 (license statement/permission). Text taken from Matricaria aurea. Encyclopedia of Life.
