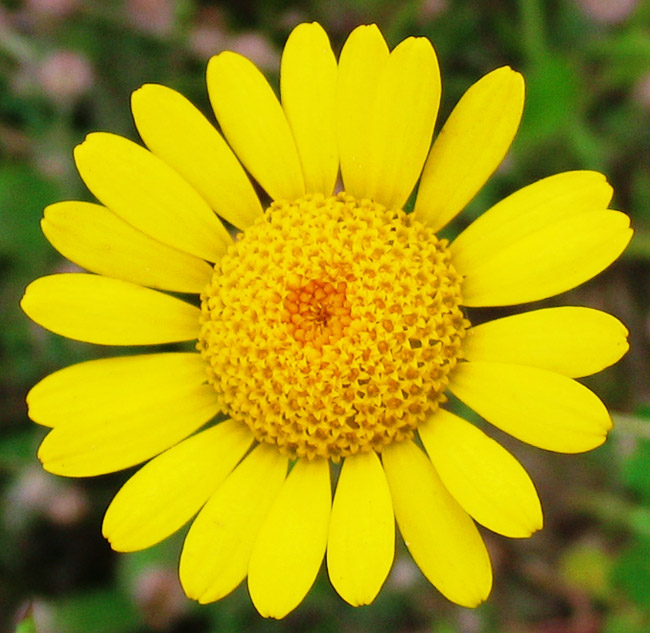
- Cota tinctoria in bloom

Scientific classification
- Kingdom: Plantae
- Clade: Tracheophytes
- Clade: Angiosperms
- Clade: Eudicots
- Clade: Asterids
- Order: Asterales
- Family: Asteraceae
- Subfamily: Asteroideae
- Tribe: Anthemideae
- Genus: Cota; J.Gay

= Cota (plant) =

Genus of flowering plants

Cota is a genus belonging to the chamomile tribe within the sunflower family. It is native to Europe, North Africa, and southwestern Asia, with a few species naturalized elsewhere. It is an herbaceous plant with flower heads including white or yellow ray florets and yellow disc florets.

Species

- Cota altissima (L.) J.Gay
- Cota amblyolepis (Eig) Holub
- Cota antitaurica (Grierson) Holub
- Cota austriaca (Jacq.) Sch.Bip.
- Cota brachmannii (Boiss. & Heldr.) Boiss.
- Cota coelopoda (Boiss.) Boiss.
- Cota dalmatica (Scheele) Oberpr. & Greuter
- Cota dipsacea (Bornm.) Oberpr. & Greuter
- Cota dubia (Steven) Holub
- Cota fulvida (Grierson) Holub
- Cota halophila (Boiss. & Balansa) Oberpr. & Greuter
- Cota jailensis (Zefir.) Holub
- Cota lyonnetioides Boiss. & Kotschy
- Cota macrantha (Heuff.) Boiss.
- Cota melanoloma (Trautv.) Holub
- Cota monantha (Willd.) Oberpr. & Greuter
- Cota oretana (Carretero) Oberpr. & Greuter
- Cota oxylepis Boiss.
- Cota palaestina Reut. ex Unger & Kotschy
- Cota pestalozzae (Boiss.) Boiss.
- Cota samuelssonii (Rech.f.) Oberpr. & Greuter
- Cota segetalis (Ten.) Holub
- Cota tinctoria (L.) J.Gay
- Cota triumfetti (L.) J.Gay
- Cota wiedemanniana (Fisch. & C.A.Mey.) Holub
