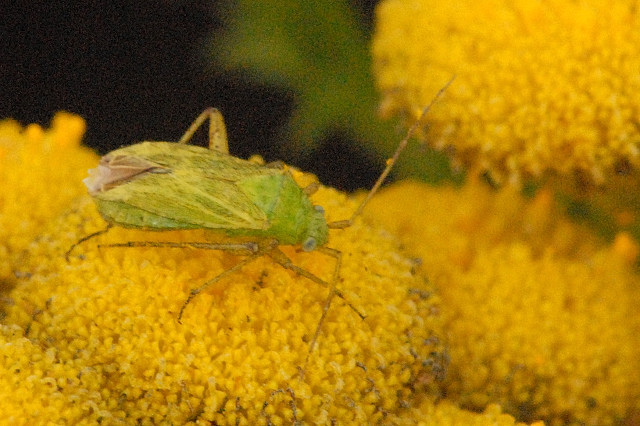
- Megalocoleus tanaceti

Scientific classification
- Kingdom: Animalia
- Phylum: Arthropoda
- Clade: Pancrustacea
- Class: Insecta
- Order: Hemiptera
- Suborder: Heteroptera
- Family: Miridae
- Subfamily: Phylinae
- Tribe: Phylini
- Genus: Megalocoleus; Reuter, 1890

= Megalocoleus =

Genus of true bugs

Megalocoleus is a genus of plant bugs in the family Miridae. There are about 18 described species in Megalocoleus.

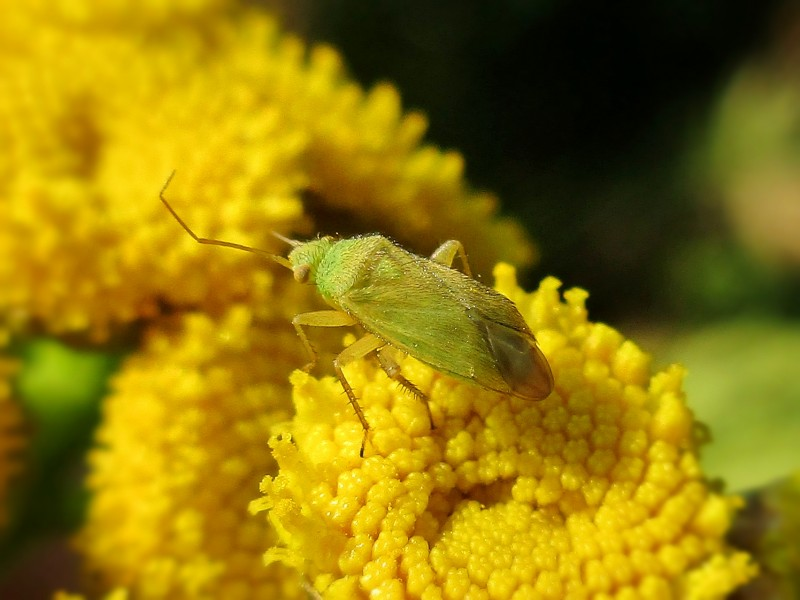
Megalocoleus tanaceti

== Species ==
These 18 species belong to the genus Megalocoleus:

- Megalocoleus aurantiacus (Fieber, 1858)
- Megalocoleus bolivari (Reuter, 1879)
- Megalocoleus chrysotrichus (Fieber, 1864)
- Megalocoleus delicatus (Perris, 1857)
- Megalocoleus dissimilis (Reuter, 1876)
- Megalocoleus eckerleini Wagner, 1969
- Megalocoleus exsanguis (Herrich-Schaeffer, 1835)
- Megalocoleus femoralis (Reuter, 1879)
- Megalocoleus krueperi (Reuter, 1879)
- Megalocoleus longirostris (Fieber, 1861)
- Megalocoleus lunula (Fieber, 1861)
- Megalocoleus matricariae Wagner, 1968
- Megalocoleus mellae (Reuter, 1876)
- Megalocoleus molliculus (Fallén, 1807)
- Megalocoleus naso (Reuter, 1879)
- Megalocoleus stysi Matocq, 2008
- Megalocoleus tanaceti (Fallén, 1807)
- Megalocoleus tarsalis (Reuter, 1894)
