= Klokov =

Klokov is a surname. Notable people with the surname include:

- Alexey Klokov (born 1965), Russian painter
- Dmitry Klokov (born 1983), Russian weightlifter
- Michail Klokov (1896–1981), Ukrainian-Soviet botanist
- Vyacheslav Klokov (born 1959), Russian heavyweight weightlifter
