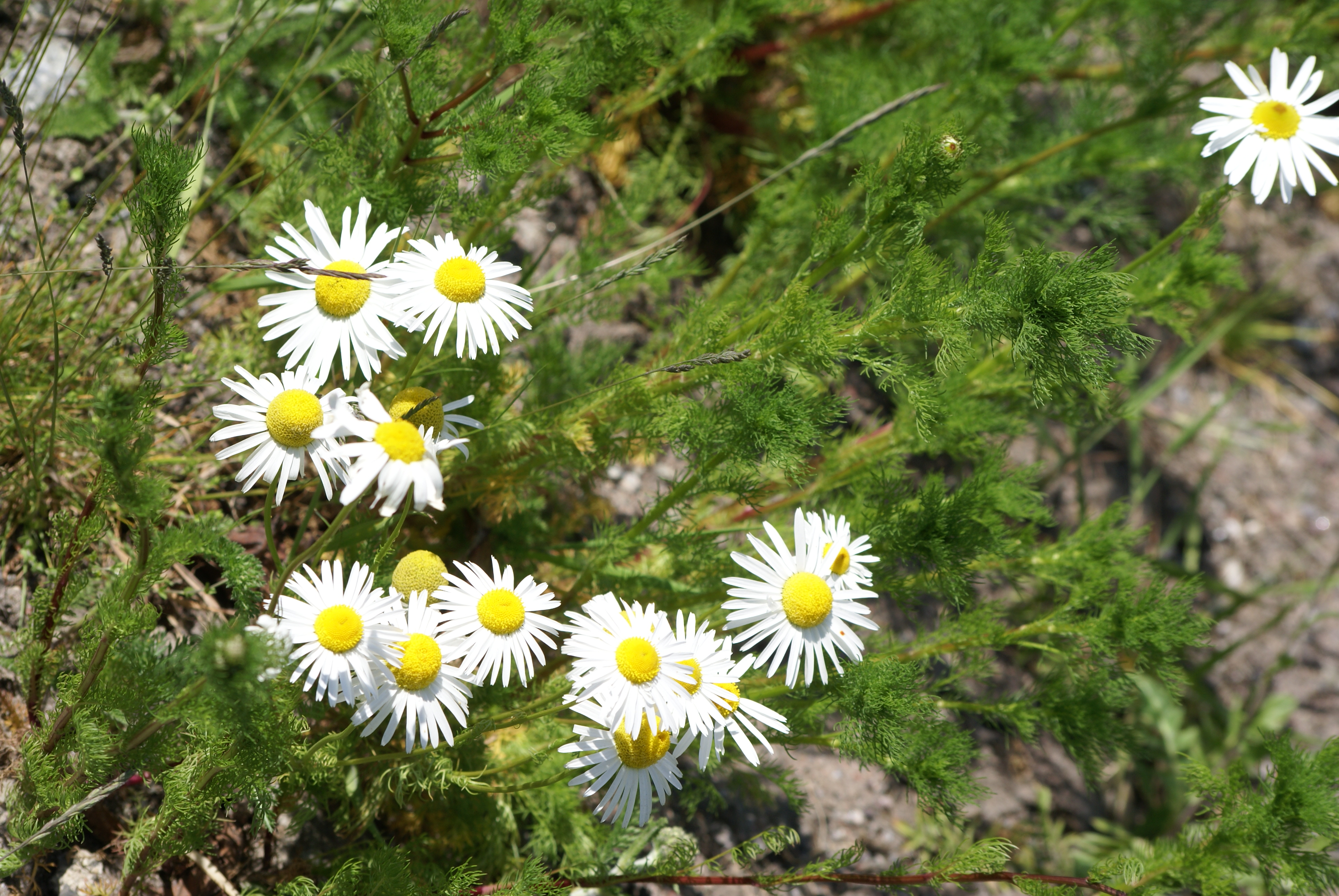
- Tripleurospermum inodorum

Scientific classification
- Kingdom: Plantae
- Clade: Tracheophytes
- Clade: Angiosperms
- Clade: Eudicots
- Clade: Asterids
- Order: Asterales
- Family: Asteraceae
- Subfamily: Asteroideae
- Tribe: Anthemideae
- Genus: Tripleurospermum; Sch.Bip. (1844)

Type species
- Tripleurospermum inodorum (L.) Sch.Bip.

Synonyms
- Rhytidospermum Sch.Bip.; Dibothrospermum Knaf; Gastrosulum Sch.Bip.; Chamaemelum Vis. 1845, illegitimate homonym not Mill. 1754; Trallesia Zumagl.; Gastrostylum Sch.Bip.; Chamomilla Godr.

= Tripleurospermum =

Genus of flowering plants

Tripleurospermum is a genus in the chamomile tribe within the sunflower family. Mayweed is a common name for plants in this genus.

Most of the species are from Europe and temperate Asia although a few are from North America and North Africa. The species are placed in Matricaria by some authors.

Plants typically have lobed leaves that are composed of one to three opposite pairs cut almost to the leaf mid rib: they have indehiscent one-celled fruits that have 3-ribs and two resinous glands at the base, Matricaria species are distinguished from these species by lacking fruits with 3-ribs and the two glands.

== Species ==
There are approximately 40 species recognised in the genus Tripleurospermum:

- Tripleurospermum ambiguum (Ledeb.) Franch. & Sav. - Heilongjiang, Xinjiang, Kazakhstan, Mongolia, Uzbekistan, Iran, Kyrgyzstan, Altai Krai
- Tripleurospermum anchialense M.Král
- Tripleurospermum auriculatum (Boiss.) Rech.f. - Middle East including Egypt and Saudi Arabia
- Tripleurospermum baytopianum E.Hossain
- Tripleurospermum breviradiatum (Ledeb.) Pobed.
- Tripleurospermum callosum (Boiss. & Heldr.) E.Hossain - Turkey
- Tripleurospermum caucasicum (Willd.) Hayek - south-eastern Europe and south-western Asia from Switzerland to Iran
- Tripleurospermum conoclinium (Boiss. & Balansa) Hayek - Greece, Turkey
- Tripleurospermum corymbosum E.Hossain
- Tripleurospermum decipiens (Fisch. & C.A Mey.) Bornm. - Turkey, Iran, Caucasus
- Tripleurospermum disciforme (C.A.Mey.) Sch.Bip. - central and south-western Asia
- Tripleurospermum elongatum (Fisch. & C.A.Mey. ex DC.) Bornm. - Turkey, Georgia
- Tripleurospermum eskilense Tekşen & Karaman - Turkey
- Tripleurospermum fissurale (Sosn.) E.Hossain - Turkey
- Tripleurospermum froedinii Rech.f.
- Tripleurospermum griersonii Yıld.
- Tripleurospermum heterolepis (Freyn & Sint.) Bornm. - Turkey
- Tripleurospermum homogamum G.X.Fu - Xinjiang
- Tripleurospermum hookeri Sch.Bip.
- Tripleurospermum hygrophilum (Bornm.) Bornm. - Turkey
- Tripleurospermum inodorum (L.) Sch.Bip. - Europe, temperate and arctic Asia; naturalized in North America, New Zealand etc., considered a noxious weed in some places
- Tripleurospermum insularum Inceer & Hay.-Ayaz
- Tripleurospermum kotschyi (Boiss.) E.Hossain
- Tripleurospermum limosum (Maxim.) Pobed. - China (Hebei, Heilongjiang, Jilin, Liaoning, Inner Mongolia), Japan, Kazakhstan, Korea, Mongolia, Uzbekistan, Russia (Irkutsk, Amur, Khabarovsk, Primorye)
- Tripleurospermum maritimum (L.) W.D.J.Koch - Arctic coasts of Eurasia and North America
- Tripleurospermum melanolepis (Boiss. & Buhse) Pobed. - Turkey, Caucasus
- Tripleurospermum microcephalum (Boiss.) Bornm. - Turkey, Iran, Syria, Lebanon
- Tripleurospermum monticola (Boiss. & A.Huet) Bornm. - Azerbaijan, Armenia
- Tripleurospermum parviflorum (Willd.) Pobed. - Greece, Ukraine, Crimea, European Russia, Caucasus, Turkey, Iran, Syria, Jordan, Lebanon, Iraq, Turkmenistan, Kazakhstan, Uzbekistan
- Tripleurospermum pichleri (Boiss.) Bornm. - Bithynia region of Turkey
- Tripleurospermum repens (Freyn & Sint.) Bornm. - Turkey
- Tripleurospermum rosellum (Boiss. & Orph.) Hayek - Greece and Turkey including islands
- Tripleurospermum rupestre (Sommier & Levier) Pobed.
- Tripleurospermum sannineum (Thiéb.) Mout. - Lebanon
- Tripleurospermum sevanense (Manden.) Pobed. - Turkey, Iran, Armenia
- Tripleurospermum subpolare Pobed. - Scandinavia, Baltic States, northern European Russia
- Tripleurospermum tempskyanum (Freyn & Sint.) Hayek - Greece
- Tripleurospermum tenuifolium (Kit.) Freyn - Caucasus; southeastern Europe from Germany to Bulgaria
- Tripleurospermum tetragonospermum (F.Schmidt) Pobed.
- Tripleurospermum transcaucasicum (Manden.) Pobed. - Turkey, Georgia, Armenia, Azerbaijan
- Tripleurospermum ziganaense Inceer & Hay.-Ayaz

== Formerly included ==
The genus is closely related to Heteromera, Matricaria, and Pyrethrum.

- Tripleurospermum breviradiatum - Matricaria breviradiata
- Tripleurospermum fuscatum - Heteromera fuscata
- Tripleurospermum philaenorum - Heteromera philaenorum
- Tripleurospermum pulchrum - Pyrethrum pulchrum
