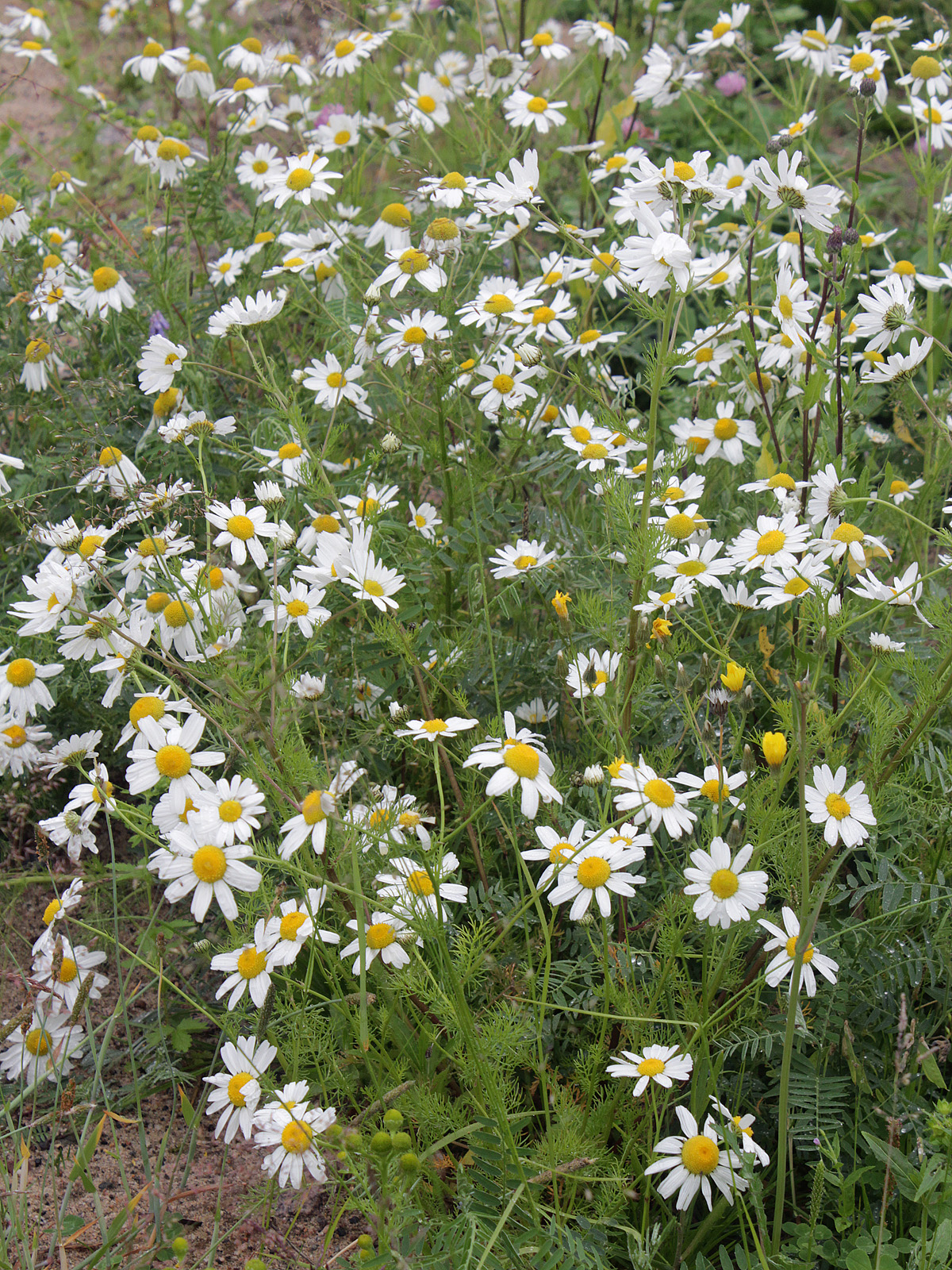
- Tripleurospermum subpolare in Finland

Scientific classification
- Kingdom: Plantae
- Clade: Tracheophytes
- Clade: Angiosperms
- Clade: Eudicots
- Clade: Asterids
- Order: Asterales
- Family: Asteraceae
- Genus: Tripleurospermum
- Species: T. subpolare

Binomial name
- Tripleurospermum subpolare Pobed.

= Tripleurospermum subpolare =

Species of flowering plant

Tripleurospermum subpolare is a species of flowering plant belonging to the family Asteraceae.

Its native range is Northern and Northeastern Europe to the northern Russian Far East.
