= Alexey Klokov =

Russian painter (born 1965)

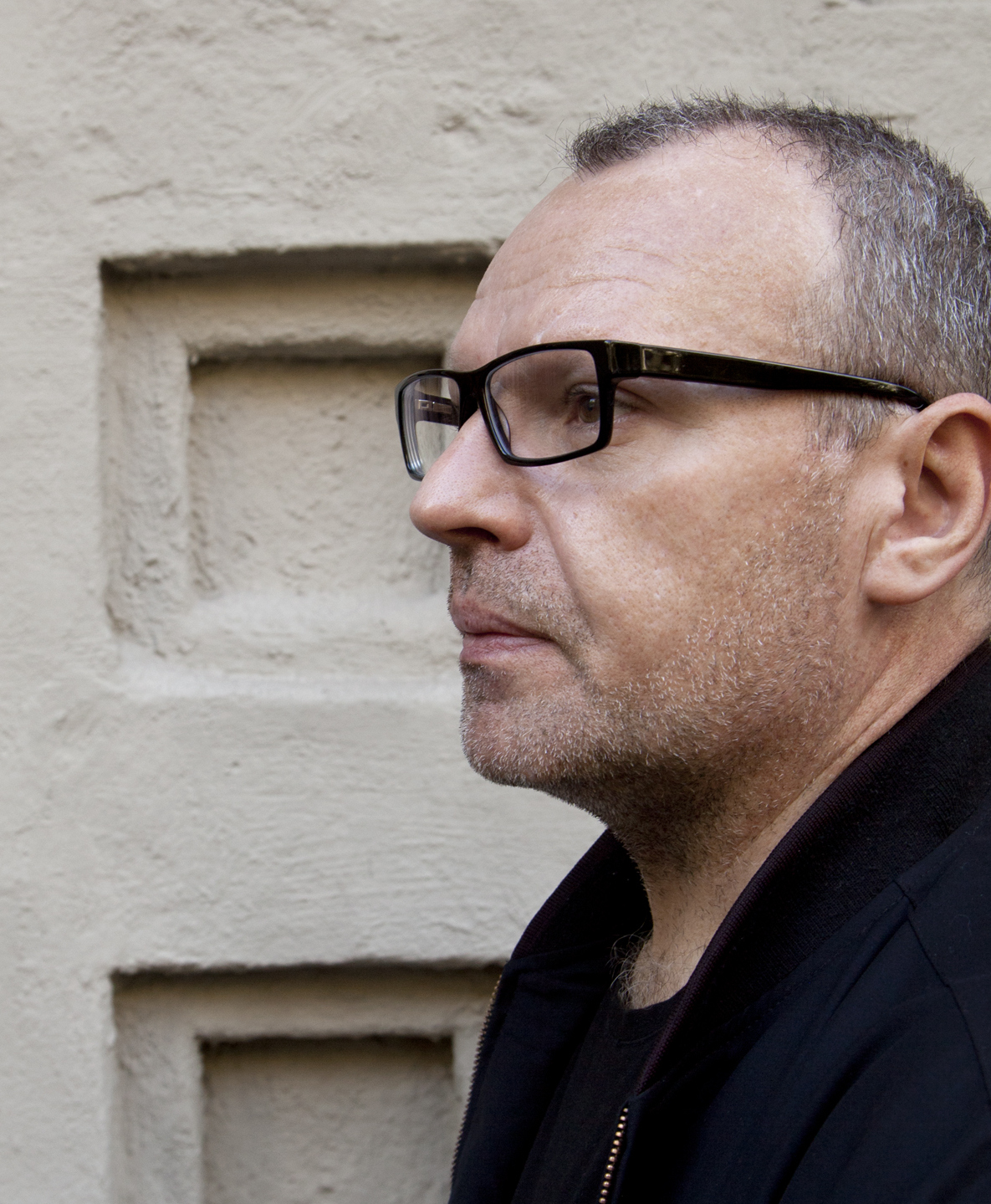
- Born: Alexey Vyacheslavovich Klokov; 2 August 1965; Beloomut, Moscow Oblast, Russia
- Known for: Art
- Website: alexklokov.com

Alexey Vyacheslavovich Klokov (Russian: Алексей Вячеславович Клоков; born August 2, 1965) is a Russian painter and a member of the Creative Union of Artists of Russia.

== Biography ==
Alexey Klokov (one of his pseudonyms is Romanov:) was born on August 2, 1965, in the village called Beloomut, situated in the Moscow region. Raised in the family of the interior designer, in 1982 he graduated from Beloomut Secondary School No. 1 then enlisted in the Ryazan Higher Airborne Command School and served in Russian army until 1984.

In 1985, Klokov became acquainted with the avant-garde master Anatoly Zverev, who turned out to be his first mentor until his death in 1986. Subsequently, Alexey entered the Leningrad Higher School of Art and Industry named after V.I. Mukhina, which he graduated from 1991 as a restorer and artist. From 1991 to 1994 he trained in the workshops at the Hermitage (Saint Petersburg) and the Tretyakov Gallery (Moscow), and from 1994 to 1998 he was engaged in the restoration of Old Russian Art.

Since 2005, he has been developing his own method of visualizing desires, namely ILG-ART (Image, Line, Gold), which is a blend of art, psychology of success and chromo therapy techniques.

He has been a member of the Creative Union of Artists of Russia since 2009.

== Work ==
Alexey Klokov started his exhibition activity in 1998 and is widely exhibited in Russia, Japan, Austria, Great Britain, Canada and the USA. He creates his paintings without preliminary sketches and the use of a palette-knife, premium art materials, which include Belgian linen, high-quality oils and enamels, high karat gold, gold leafing, antique objects and coins.

Among the characteristic features of the artist, is an open color, a textured stroke and volume. The art critic Stanislav Aydinyan calls him "expressive, intense and a prolific colorist". The works of Alexey Klokov, according to the art critic Alexander Evangely, are associated with the illustration of Jungian ideas; a "balance between abstraction and figurativeness". According to the opinion of the art critic Mikhail Andreev, his style is "dialectic in color".

The most expensive work of Alexey Klokov is the installation of an antique Madeira wine bottle of the early 20th century which incorporates a gold 585 fineness sheet on a background of 19th century French wine barrels. The cumulative weight of the gold amounts to 1546 grams.

Another dimension of the artist is a technique, which he titles "randomness". Klokov believes that at times paints may be dissimilar in their structure and that while involuntarily mixing, they may react and "boil". Knowing this interaction and "the laws of confrontation" of basic solvents, this process can be controlled.

At the Seyhoun Art Gallery exhibition, held in Los Angeles in February 2016, his oils of various genres were presented which included "Harmony of Two", "Spring Solo" and "Autobiography" and other paintings. Following this exhibition, a year later in the spring of 2017 in New York Klokov introduced a new collection of his abstract works entitled "Suggestive Abstract" and "Abstract Moderne".

His paintings are included in the collections of notables, Silvio Berlusconi, Hillary Clinton, the family of Emir of Qatar, Tony Blair, Condoleezza Rice, Madeleine Albright, Boris Johnson, Quentin Tarantino, Emir Kusturica, Patrick Swayze, Paco Rabanne, and Marwan Chatila.

== Personal exhibitions ==
Alexey Klokov started his exhibition activity in 1998. By 2017, the number of exhibitions totaled 35, among them

- 1998 - Central House of Artists, Moscow, Russia
- 1999-2001 - Permanent exhibition at the President Hotel, Moscow
- 2001 - Diplomatic Academy of the Ministry of Foreign Affairs of Russia, Moscow
- 2001 - Central House of Artists, Moscow
- 2002 - Embassy of Russia, Tokyo, Japan
- 2003 - Art Tower Mito, Mito, Japan
- 2004 - Russian Cultural Foundation, Moscow
- 2004 - Council of Federation of the Federal Assembly of the Russian Federation, Moscow
- 2005 – Housing Complex "Filippovskiy", with the support of the development company "Don Stroi", Moscow
- 2005 - Housing Complex "Novopeskovskiy", with the support of the development company "Don Stroi", Moscow
- 2006 - State Duma of the Russian Federation, Moscow
- 2006 – Housing Complex "Vorobyovy Gory", with the support of the development company "Don Stroi", Moscow
- 2007 - Russian Center for Science and Culture, Vienna, Austria
- 2008 - "Kulturkreis Wien" Gallery with the support of the Russian Embassy, Vienna
- 2009 - Embassy of Russia, London, Great Britain
- 2010 - Jewelry house «Chatila», London
- 2010 - «BSI group» for VIP-clients, London
- 2010 - Art-Manege (group)
- 2011 - Gallery «Harrods», London
- 2011 – Shopping Mall "Afimoll", a joint project with the jewelry house Adamas and Lena Lenina, Moscow
- 2011 - restaurant "Casino", a joint project with Lena Lenina, Moscow
- 2012 - Gallery «Harrods», London
- 2012 - Sberbank central office for VIP clients, Moscow
- 2012 - restaurant-gallery "Belyi Kvadrat", a joint project with Lena Lenina, Moscow
- 2013 - Regional Savings Bank, Moscow
- 2014 — «Royal Yacht Club», Moscow
- 2014 — «I.B.Clark Gallery», New Hope, Pennsylvania, United States
- 2014 — (E)merge Art Fair, Washington, D.C., USA
- 2015 — Santa Fe Art Fair, Santa Fe, New Mexico, USA
- 2016 — «Seyhoun Gallery», Los Angeles, USA
- 2016 – «Subzero & Wolf» VIP Preview, Toronto, Canada
- 2016 – «ArtaGallery», Toronto
- 2017 – The Artist Project Art Fair, Toronto
- 2017 – ArtExpo, New York, USA
- 2017 – Red Dot Miami, Miami, USA
