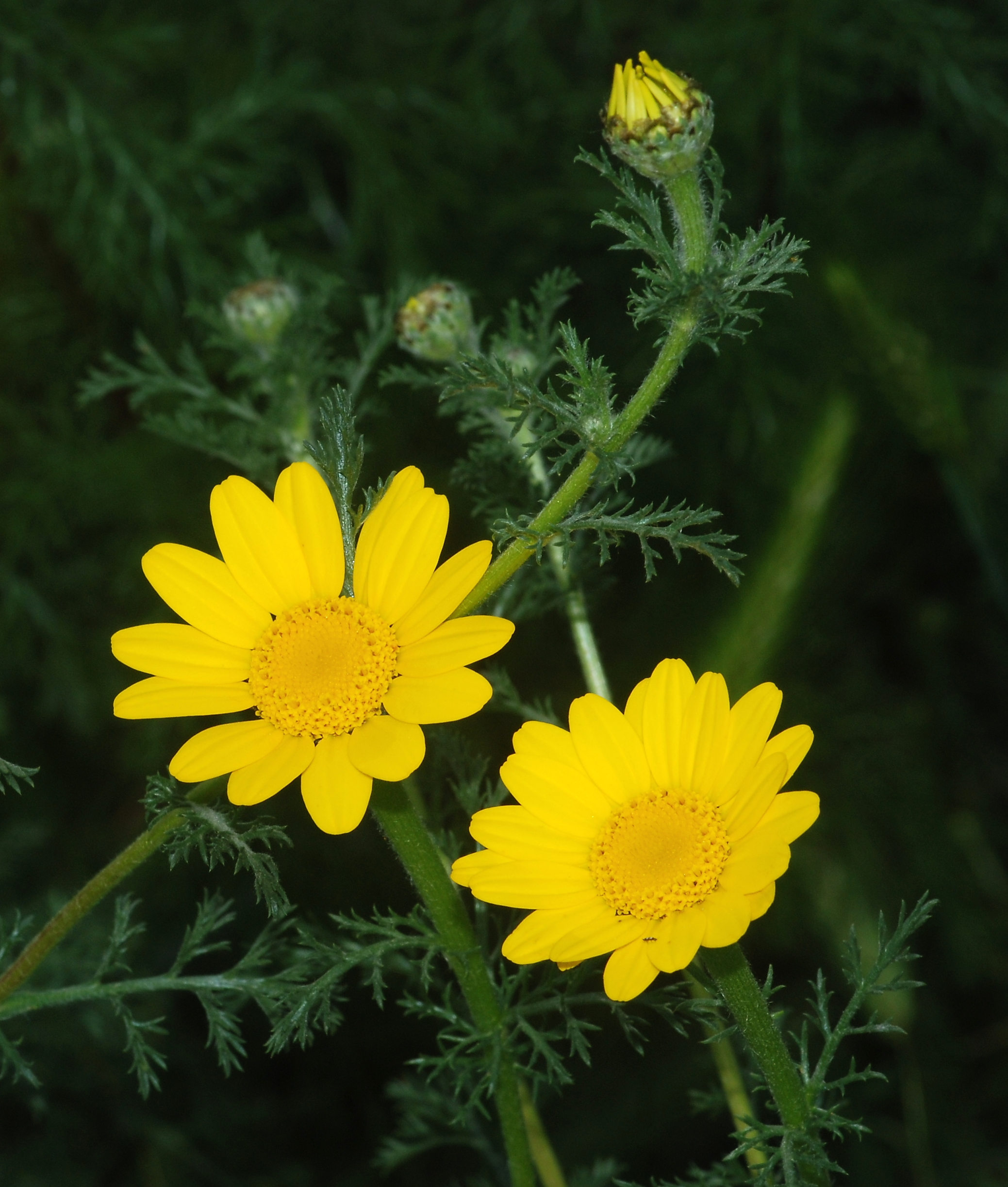

Scientific classification
- Kingdom: Plantae
- Clade: Tracheophytes
- Clade: Angiosperms
- Clade: Eudicots
- Clade: Asterids
- Order: Asterales
- Family: Asteraceae
- Genus: Cota
- Species: C. tinctoria

Binomial name
- Cota tinctoria (L.) J. Gay ex Guss.

Synonyms
- Synonymy: Anthemis tinctoria L. (basionym); Anacyclus tinctorius (L.) Samp.; Anthemis brachyglossa K.Koch; Anthemis chrysantha Schur; Anthemis coarctata Sm.; Anthemis debilis Fed.; Anthemis discoidea (All.) Vahl; Anthemis discoidea (All.) Willd.; Anthemis kelwayi Hort. ex L.H.Bailey & N.Taylor; Anthemis maris-nigri Fed.; Anthemis maritima Sm. 1839 not L. 1753; Anthemis markhotensis Fed.; Anthemis pallescens Heldr. ex Nyman; Anthemis parnassi Boiss. & Heldr. ex Nyman; Anthemis saguramica Sosn.; Anthemis subtinctoria Dobrocz.; Anthemis zephyrovii Dobrocz.; Chamaemelum discoideum All.; Chamaemelum tinctorium (L.) Schreb; Anthemis euxina Boiss., syn of subsp. euxina; Cota euxina (Boiss.) Holub, syn of subsp. euxina; Anthemis bulgarica Thin, syn of subsp. gaudium-solis; Anthemis gaudium-solis Velen., syn of subsp. gaudium-solis; Anthemis parnassica (Boiss. & Heldr.) Nyman, syn of subsp. parnassica; Anthemis sancti-johannis Stoj. & al., syn of subsp. sancti-johannis; Cota sancti-johannis Holub, syn of subsp. sancti-johannis; Anthemis meinkeana Rech.f., syn of subsp. virescens

= Cota tinctoria =

Species of flowering plant

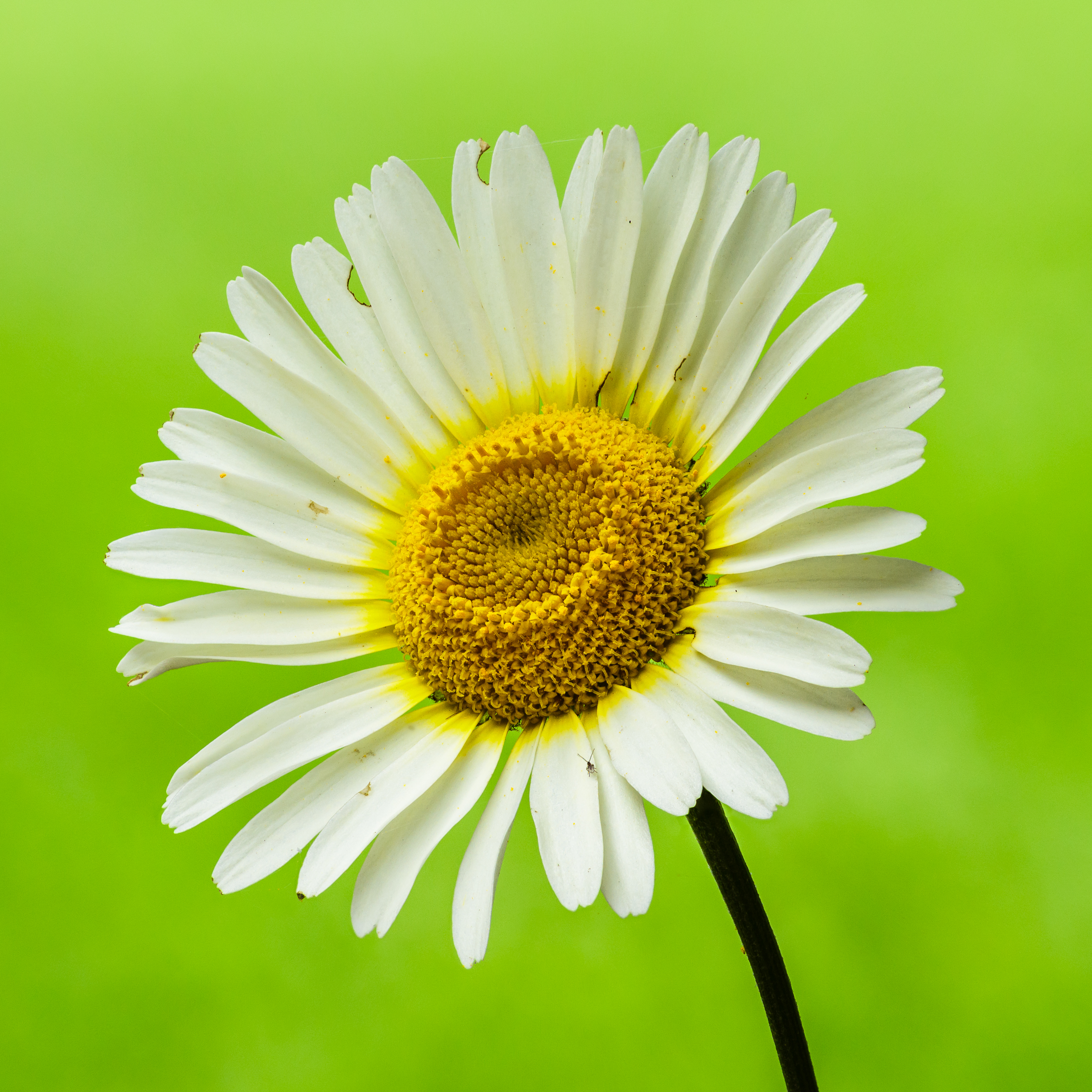
Inflorescence.

Cota tinctoria, the golden marguerite, yellow chamomile, or oxeye chamomile, is a species of perennial flowering plant in the sunflower family. Other common names include dyer's chamomile, Boston daisy, and Paris daisy. In horticulture this plant is still widely referred to by its synonym Anthemis tinctoria.

It is a short-lived plant often treated as biennial, native to Europe, the Mediterranean and Western Asia and naturalized in scattered locations in North America. It has aromatic, bright green, feathery foliage. The serrate leaves are bi-pinnatifid (= finely divided) and downy beneath. It grows to a height of 60 cm (24 in).

It has yellow daisy-like terminal flower heads on long thin angular stems, blooming in profusion during the summer.

It has no culinary or commercial uses and only limited medicinal uses. However, it produces excellent yellow, buff and golden-orange dyes, used in the past for fabrics.

Cota tinctoria is grown in gardens for its bright attractive flowers and fine lacy foliage; there is a white-flowering form. Under the synonym Anthemis tinctoria, the cultivar 'E.C. Buxton' has gained the Royal Horticultural Society's Award of Garden Merit. The popular seed-raised cultivar 'Kelwayi' has 5 cm wide, yellow flowers on 65 cm plants.

Flower of a *Cota tinctoria*

The species hybridizes with Tripleurospermum inodorum to form the hybrid × Tripleurocota sulfurea.

== Subspecies ==
- Cota tinctoria subsp. australis (R.Fern.) Oberpr. & Greuter
- Cota tinctoria subsp. euxina (Boiss.) Oberpr. & Greuter
- Cota tinctoria subsp. fussii (Griseb. & Schenk) Oberpr. & Greuter
- Cota tinctoria subsp. gaudium-solis (Velen.) Oberpr. & Greuter
- Cota tinctoria subsp. parnassica (Boiss. & Heldr.) Oberpr. & Greuter
- Cota tinctoria subsp. sancti-johannis (Stoj. & al.) Oberpr. & Greuter
- Cota tinctoria subsp. virescens (Bornm.) Oberpr. & Greuter
