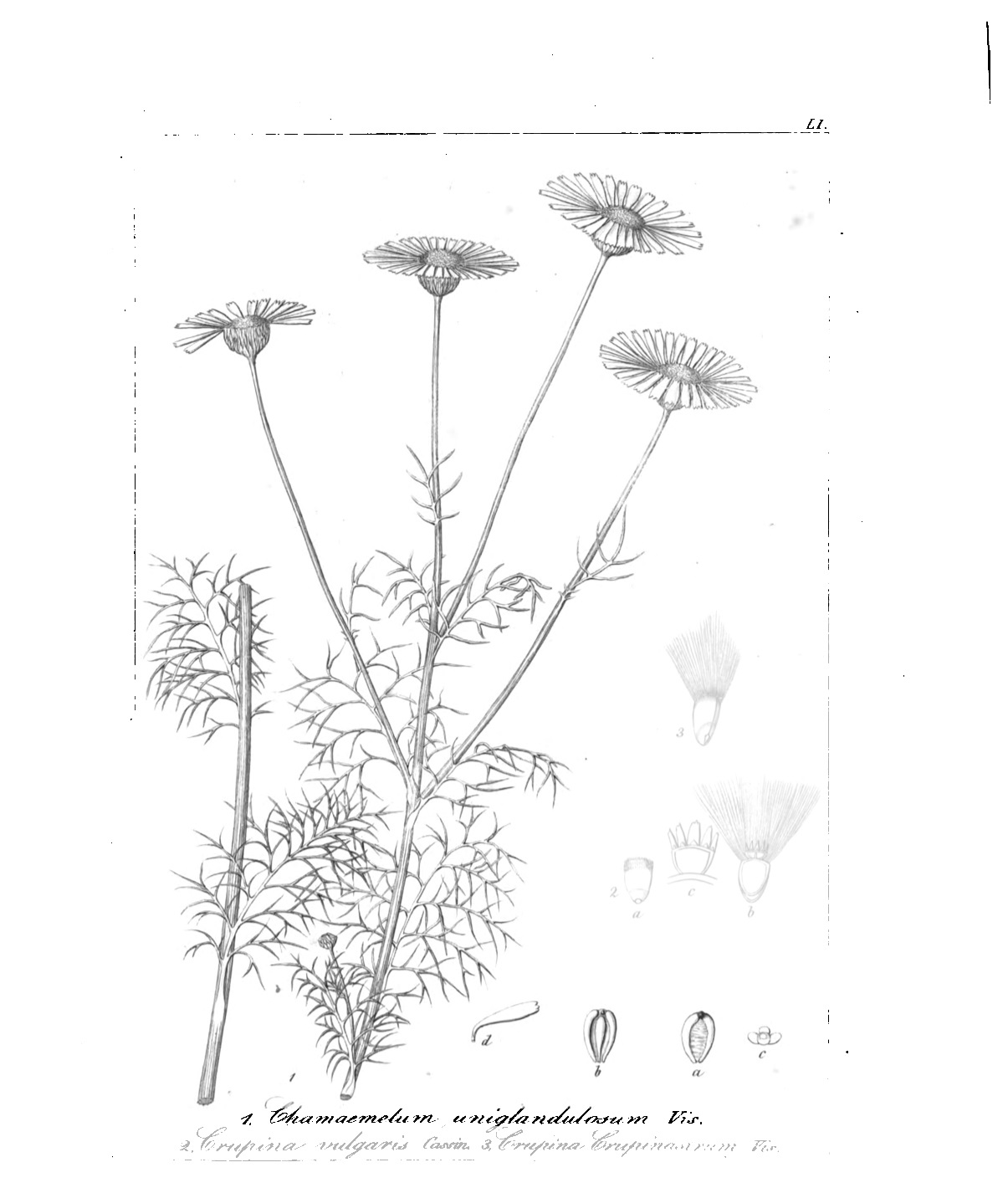
- Botanical illustration

Scientific classification
- Kingdom: Plantae
- Clade: Tracheophytes
- Clade: Angiosperms
- Clade: Eudicots
- Clade: Asterids
- Order: Asterales
- Family: Asteraceae
- Genus: Tripleurospermum
- Species: T. tenuifolium

Binomial name
- Tripleurospermum tenuifolium (Kit.) Freyn

Synonyms
- List: Chamaemelum trichophyllum Boiss.; Chamaemelum uniglandulosum Vis.; Chrysanthemum tenuifolium Kit.; Chrysanthemum trichophyllum Boiss.; Chrysanthemum trichotomum Walp.; Matricaria aserbaidshanica Rauschert; Matricaria trichophylla Boiss.; Matricaria uniglandulosa K.Koch; Pyrethrum exaltatum Griseb.; Pyrethrum trichophyllum Griseb.; Tripleurospermum trichophyllum (Boiss.) K.Malý; Tripleurospermum tzvelevii Pobed.

= Tripleurospermum tenuifolium =

Species of plant in the daisy family

Tripleurospermum tenuifolium is a species of daisy in the family Asteraceae and is in the tribe Anthemideae. It ranges from Austria, Hungary, through southeastern Europe to Turkey, and the Caucasus. Its chromosome count is 2n=28.
