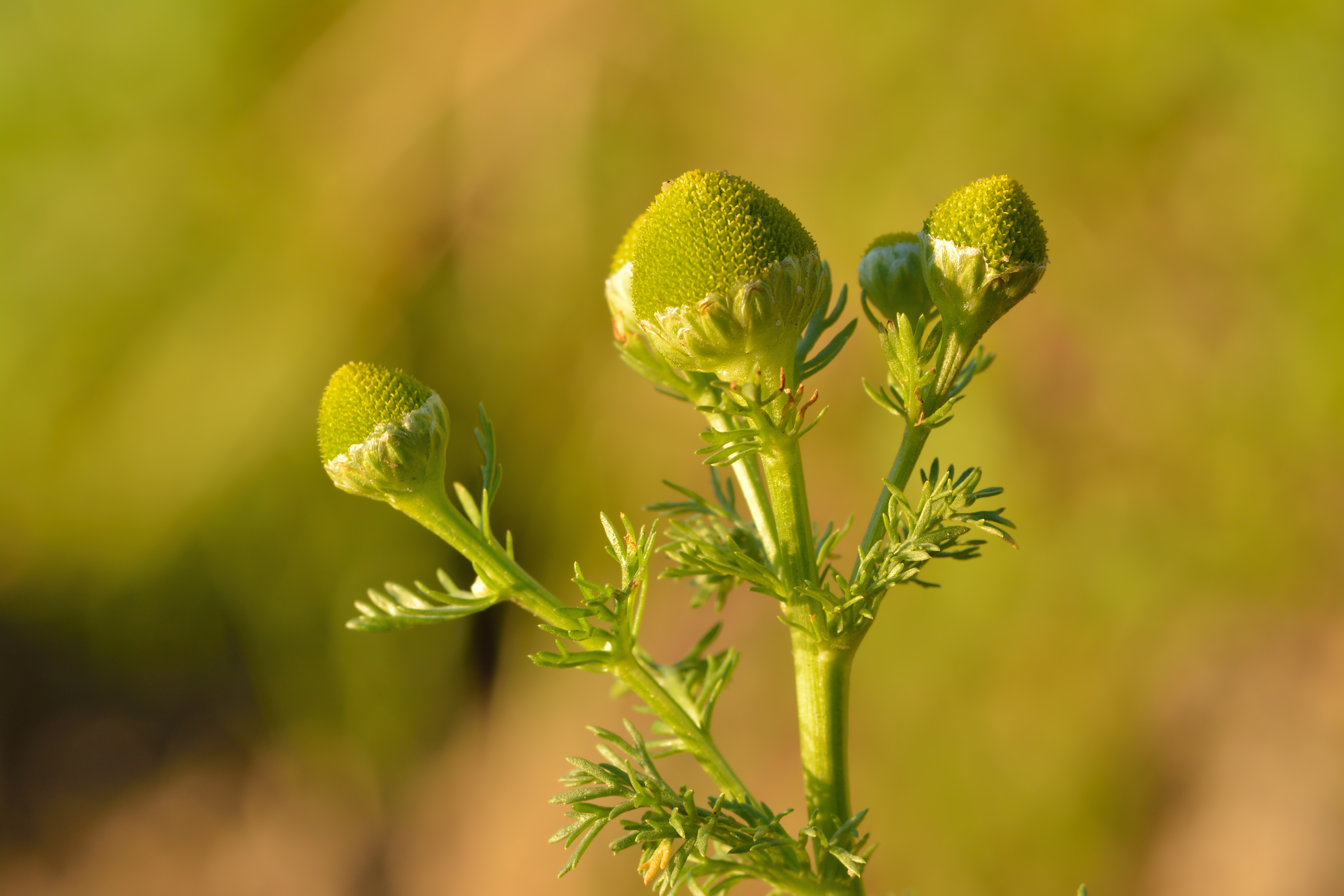
- Pineappleweed

Conservation status
- Secure (NatureServe)

Scientific classification
- Kingdom: Plantae
- Clade: Tracheophytes
- Clade: Angiosperms
- Clade: Eudicots
- Clade: Asterids
- Order: Asterales
- Family: Asteraceae
- Genus: Matricaria
- Species: M. discoidea

Binomial name
- Matricaria discoidea DC.

Synonyms
- Artemisia matricarioides auct. Chamomilla suaveolens (Pursh) Rydb. Lepidanthus suaveolens (Pursh) Nutt. Lepidotheca suaveolens (Pursh) Nutt. Matricaria matricarioides auct. Matricaria suaveolens (Pursh) Buchenau; Santolina suaveolens Pursh; Tanacetum suaveolens (Pursh) Hook. Source: NRCS, GRIN

= Matricaria discoidea =

Species of flowering plant

Matricaria discoidea, commonly known as pineappleweed, wild chamomile, disc mayweed, and rayless mayweed, is an annual plant native to North America and/or northern Asia, where it grows as a common herb of fields, gardens, and roadsides. It is in the daisy family Asteraceae. When crushed, the flowers and foliage emit a strong pineapple-like aroma, giving the plant its common name.

== Description ==
The flowers of M. discoidea, are small, dome-shaped capitula that resemble single flower heads but are composed of densely packed yellowish green corollas. Each plant typically carries at least five capitula, and each capitulum measures 5–15 mm across. The capitula lacks ray florets, giving the flowers their distinctive button-like appearance. The capitula are typically solitary or arranged in loose clusters, and they are supported by short peduncles about 5–10 mm in length. Papery bracts (small, leaf-like structures) surround the capitulum in three rows, with membranous margins and rounded tips.

Like other members of the Asteraceae family, it produces florets with an inferior ovary. The hollow, conical receptacle contains numerous tubular, bisexual disc florets, each with five stamens and a pistil formed from two fused carpels. There are no scales between the disc florets. Matricaria species have flattened and penicillate style branches, aiding in pollen transfer. Flowerheads are commonly produced from March to September.

The leaves are pinnately divided one to three times, with blades measuring approximately 10–65 mm long and 2–20 mm wide. As an annual species, the leaves senesce along with the rest of the plant at the end of each growing season.

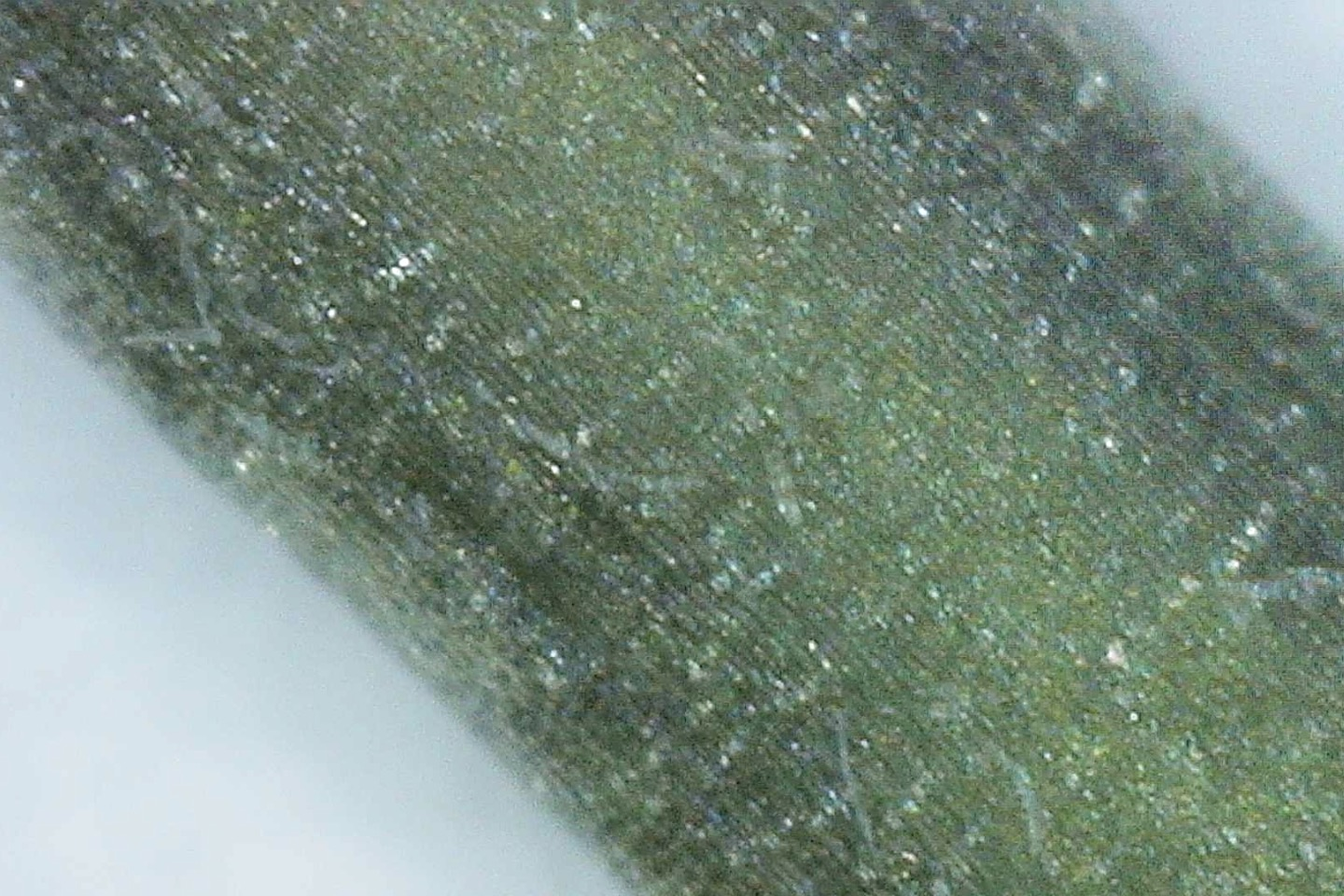
Translucent trichomes on the upper surface of a Matricaria discoidea leaf

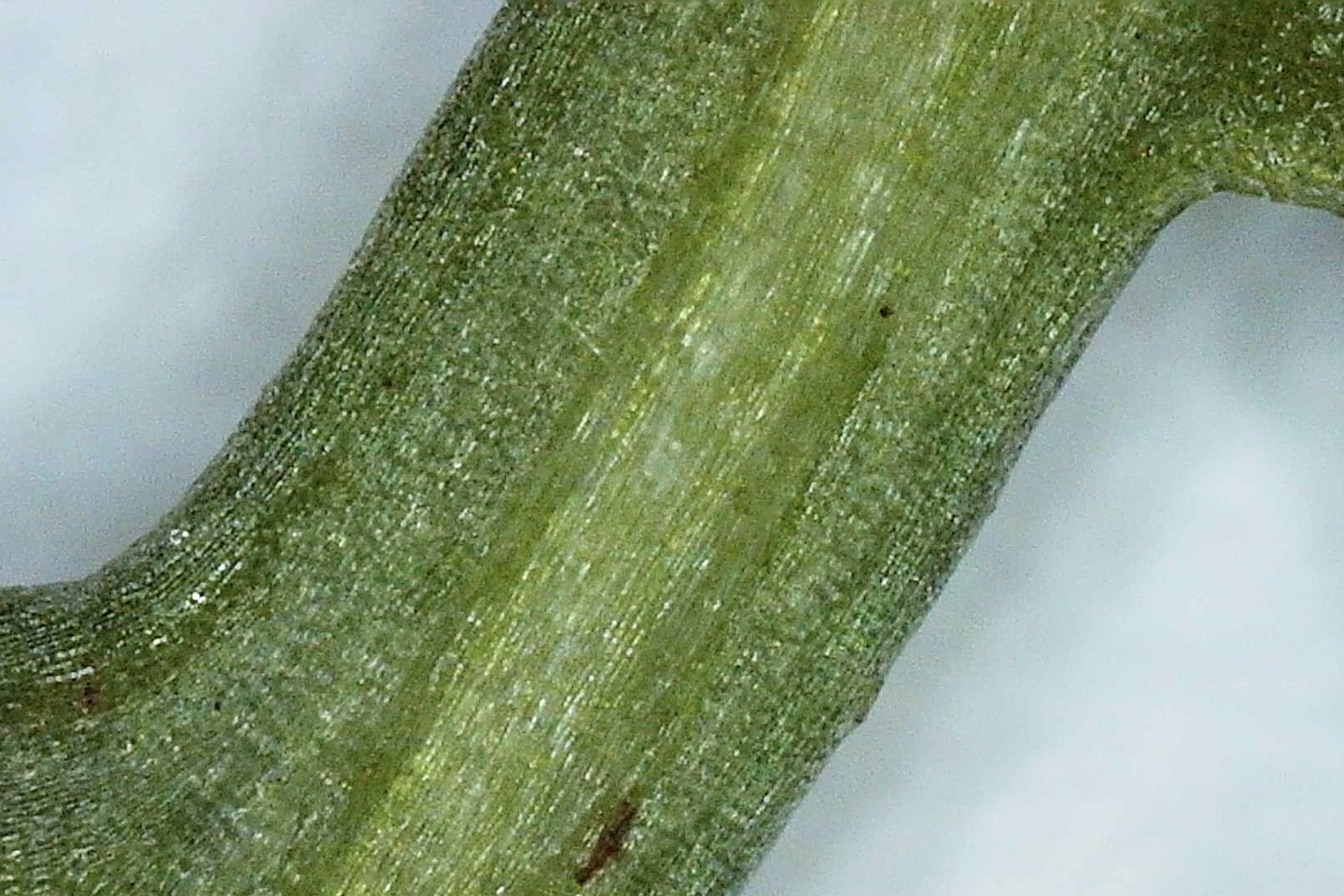
Detail on the midvein of a Matricaria discoidea leaf

Although the foliage appears glabrous, under high magnification it has many microscopic trichomes made of short basal cells and a long, pointed terminal cell.

Microscopically, the leaves are amphistomatic, with stomata present on both the adaxial and abaxial surfaces, positioned close to the epidermis and flanked by oval-shaped guard cells. The cuticle is thin (~2.6 μm), and the leaf surfaces show little difference between top and bottom. Each square millimeter of the upper leaf surface contains 205 stomata on average, while the lower surface contains an estimated 142 stomata per mm^{2}.

Internally, leaves have one large and two medium vascular bundles, along with accessory bundles and secretory canals (resin ducts) distributed throughout the mesophyll. Consistent with most Asteraceae, M. discoidea uses the C_{3} photosynthetic pathway.

M. discoidea has a shallow root system defined by a short, thick taproot with many fine secondary fibrous roots. The taproot descends directly from the seed's embryo and grows vertically downward.

== Distribution and habitat ==
The plant thrives in disturbed areas, especially those with poor, compacted soil. It often blooms along footpaths and roadsides in spring and early summer. It occurs across Canada and the United States, especially as a common weed in Alaska, the Yukon, and the Northwest Territories. However, there is disagreement over whether it originated in North America or in Siberia. This species has been introduced to Europe, Asia, Iceland, South America, and New Zealand and is now widespread and naturalized in Britain, where it has become one of the fastest-spreading plants of the 20th century.

== Reproduction ==
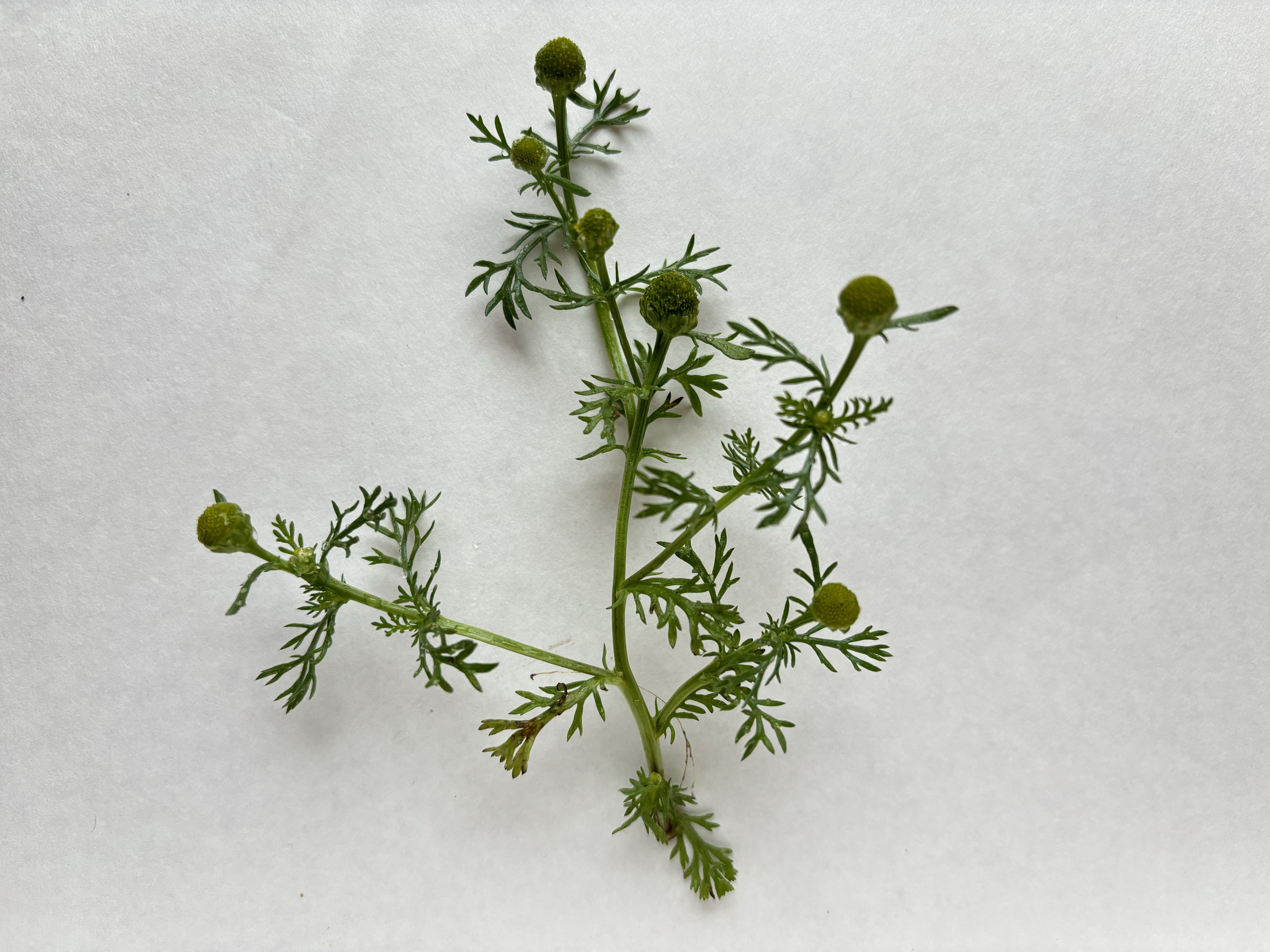
Aboveground plant body of Matricaria discoidea

M. discoidea reproduces solely through seed formation. The flower heads produce small, light brown, ribbed seeds measuring 1.3–1.6 mm in length by <0.7 mm in width and weighing 0.14 mg on average. Each seed is enveloped in a 19.6–22.8 μm-thick seed coat and packaged in a small, dry, indehiscent fruit achene.

Flowering occurs rapidly under favorable conditions. In temperate environments such as England, M. discoidea may flower only 37–50 days after seedling emergence, depending on temperature and day length. Shorter photoperiods and later-season germination extend the time to flowering, often causing overwintering as a rosette before blooming the following spring.

Individual flower heads produce 50–400 seeds. The main plant has been observed to produce up to six thousand seeds in the United Kingdom, while in Alaska the main plant usually contains 11–1000 seeds. Pineapple weed readily fertilizes itself, and the species typically produces seeds one or more times per year.

Buried M. discoidea seeds have been found to quickly lose viability at an estimated rate of 15% per year over their first ten years, although they generally remain viable for a minimum of three years. Similarly, seeds experience a steep decline in dormancy in the initial years after burial. Successful germination requires light and open, disturbed soil, as seeds buried too deeply will not sprout.

== Ecology ==
Seeds are very easily dispersed by water, adhesion to animals, human activity, and motor vehicles. A study by Dunmail J. Hodkinson and Ken Thompson found that M. discoidea is one of the most common plants to be transported in this way.

The roots of pineapple weed are colonized by arbuscular mycorrhizal fungi. These mycorrhizae give the plant greater access to water as well as nutrients like phosphorus, nitrogen, sulfur, and trace elements.

Despite M. discoidea's ability to self-pollinate, insect pollination also occurs. Its pollen has been identified in brood cells of Megachile versicolor (leafcutter bee). Butterflies have also been known to drink nectar from the flowers of Matricaria species.

== Uses ==
The greens can be washed and eaten, and both the flowers and the whole plant can be steeped to make tea, described as "excellent" by one field guide. They have also been used in salads (although they may become bitter by the time the plant blooms). Extracts from the flowers and other aerial parts of the plant have been shown to possess non-toxic, pain-relieving, and mildly sedative effects, reflecting the biological activity concentrated in the floral tissues.

== Gallery ==
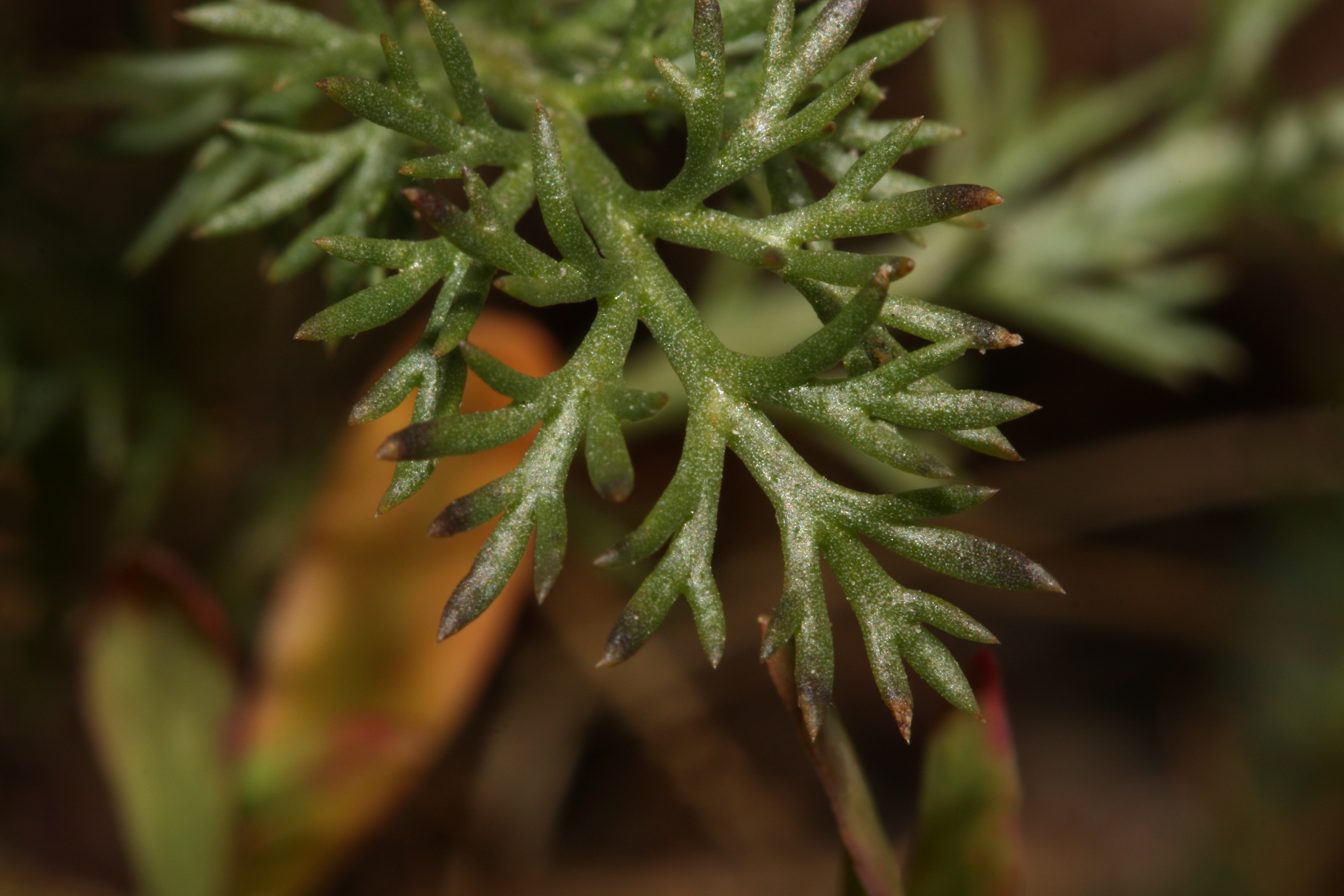
The pinnately dissected leaves are sweet-scented when crushed.

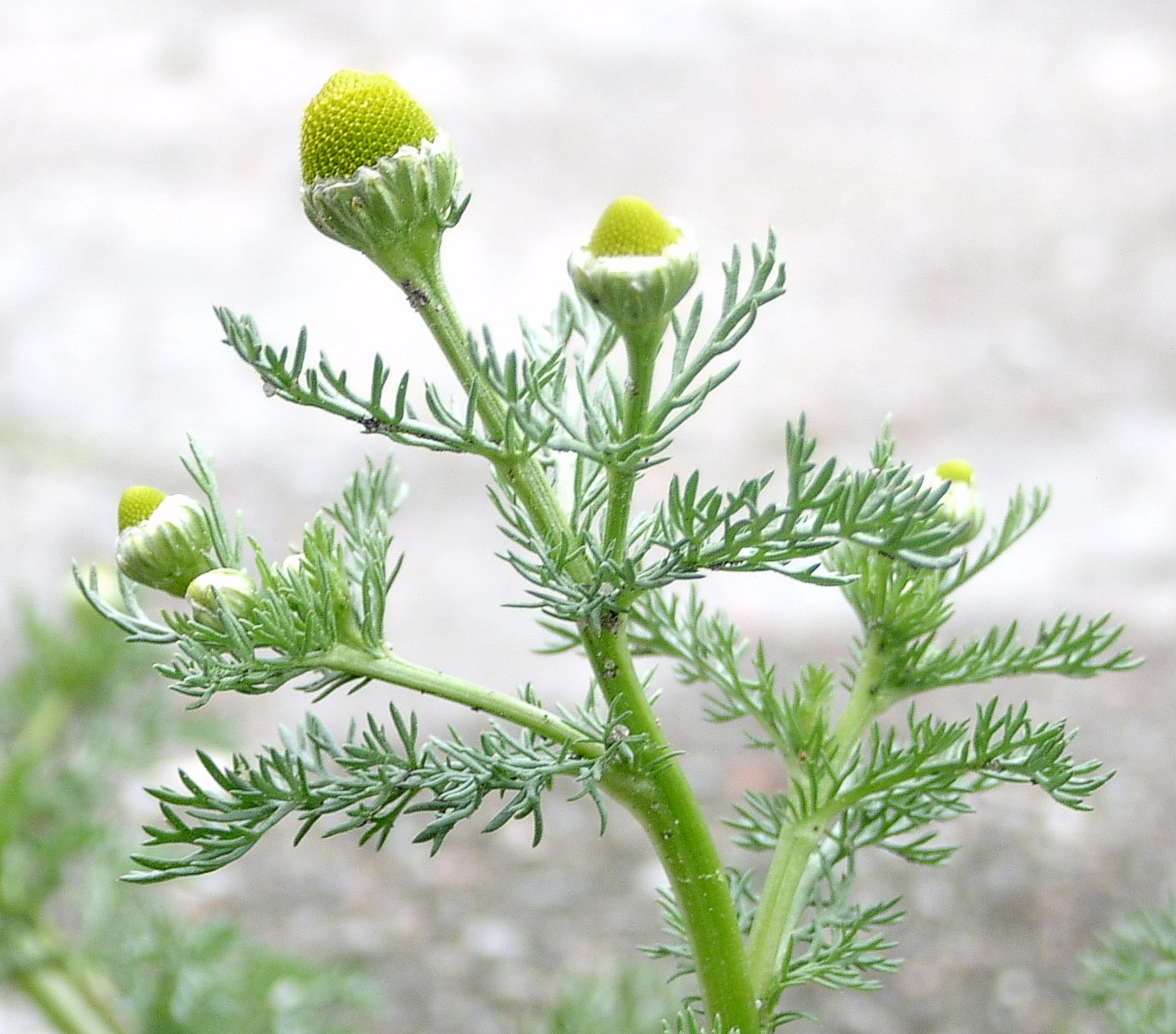

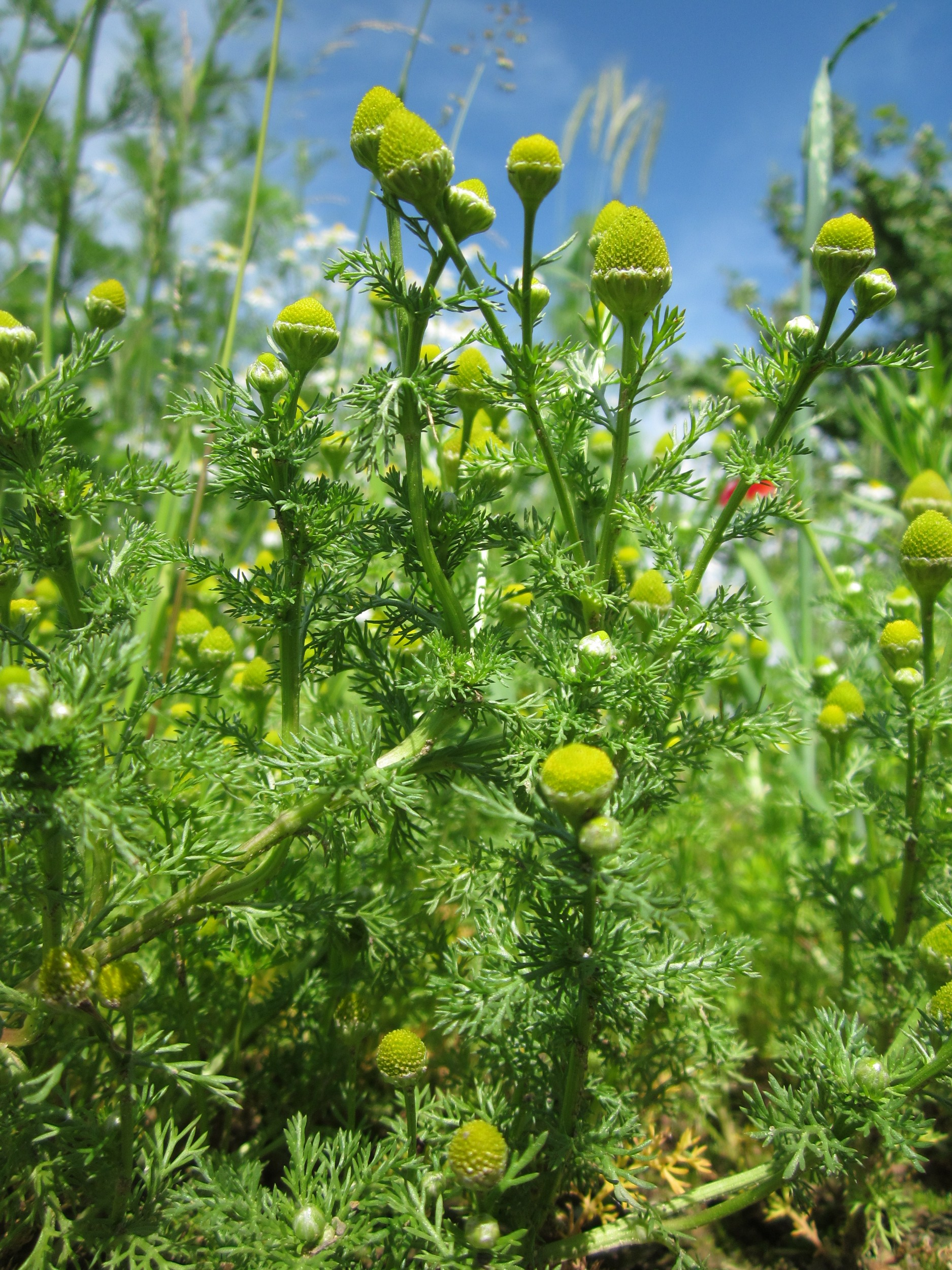

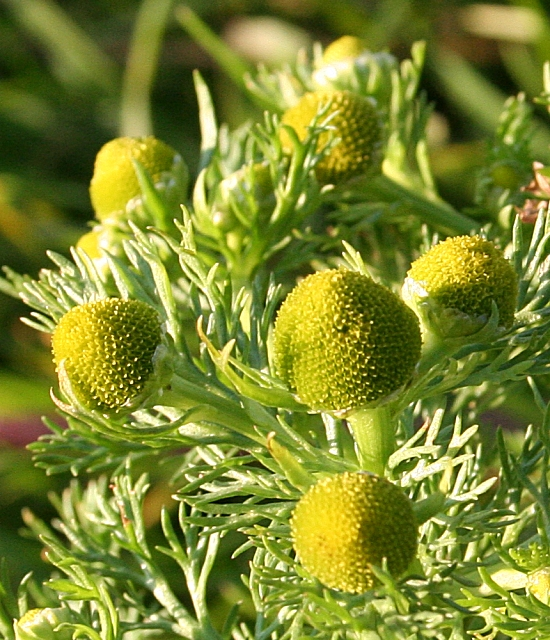

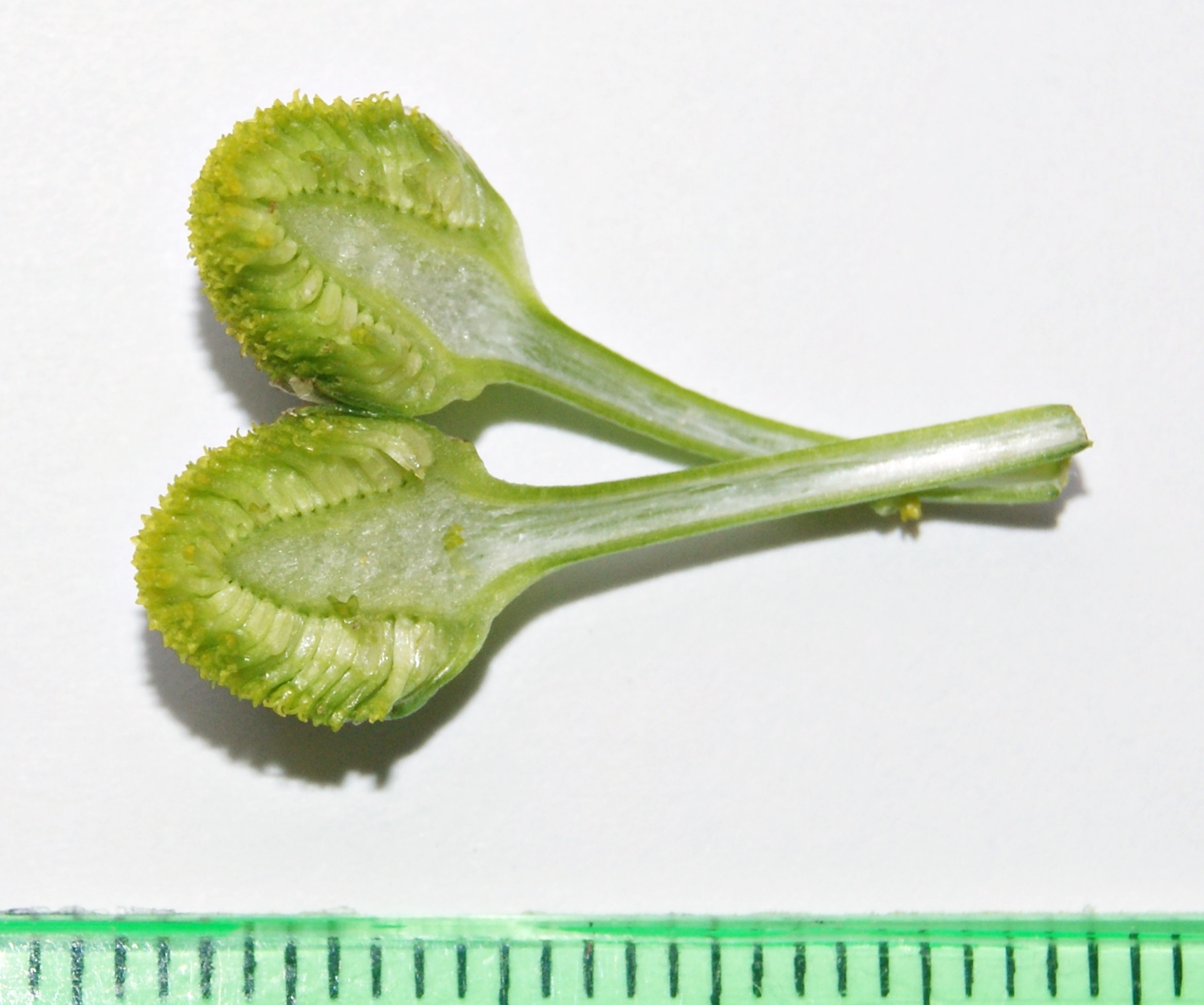
