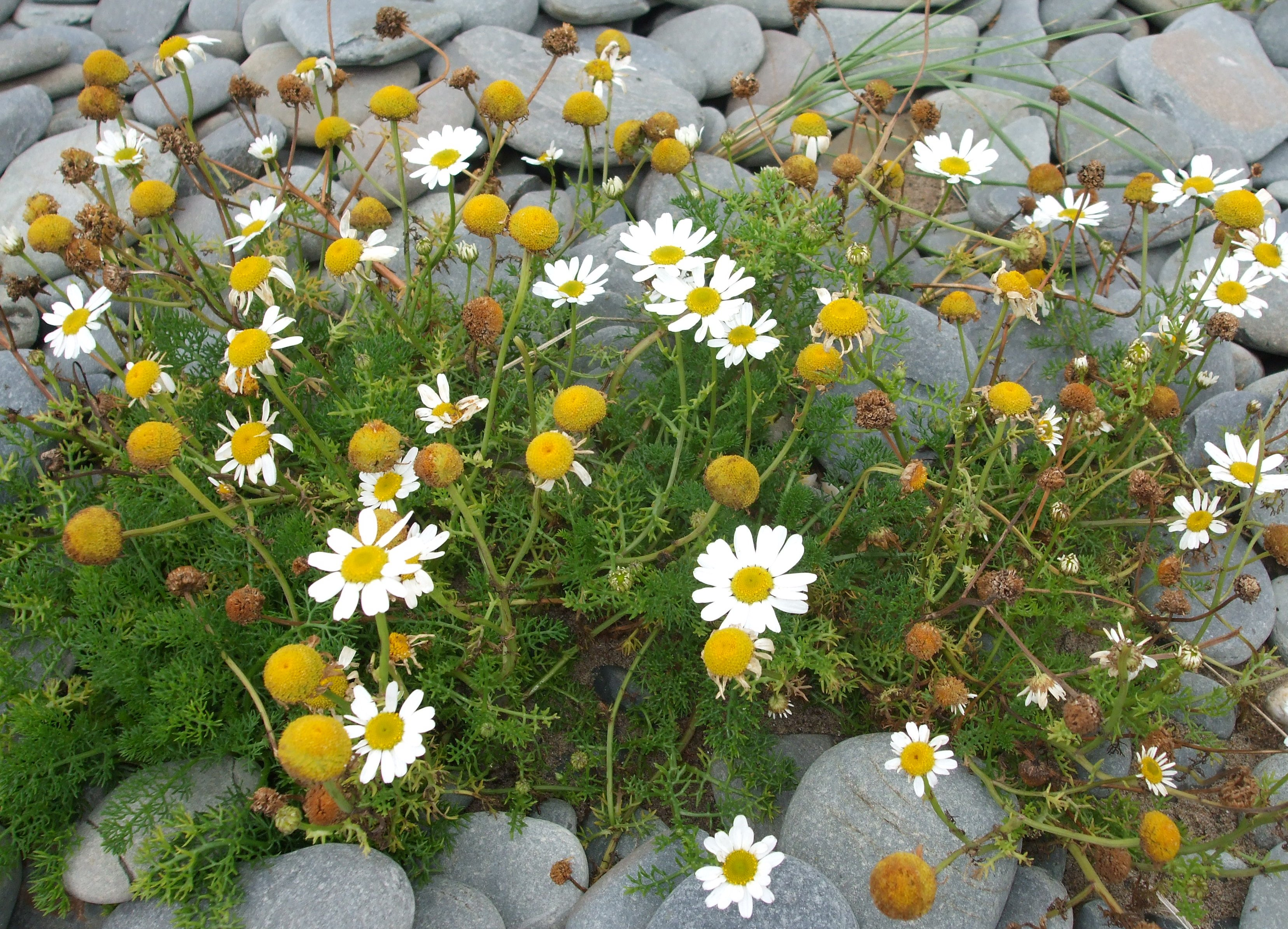

Conservation status
- Secure (NatureServe)

Scientific classification
- Kingdom: Plantae
- Clade: Tracheophytes
- Clade: Angiosperms
- Clade: Eudicots
- Clade: Asterids
- Order: Asterales
- Family: Asteraceae
- Genus: Tripleurospermum
- Species: T. maritimum

Binomial name
- Tripleurospermum maritimum (L.) W.D.J.Koch

Subspecies
- T. m. subsp. boreale; T. m. subsp. maritimum; T. m. subsp. nigriceps; T. m. subsp. vinicaule

Synonyms
- List: Chamaemelum inodorum var. maritimum; Chamaemelum maritimum; Chamomilla maritima; Chrysanthemum maritimum; Matricaria inodora var. maritima; Matricaria inodora proles maritima; Matricaria inodora subsp. maritima; Matricaria maritima L.

= Tripleurospermum maritimum =

Plant species in the daisy family

Tripleurospermum maritimum is a species of flowering plant in the aster family commonly known as false mayweed or sea mayweed. It is found in many coastal areas of Northern Europe, including Scandinavia and Iceland, often growing in sand or amongst beach pebbles.

== Description ==
Tripleurospermum maritimum is a herbaceous plant that grows as a biennial or short-lived perennial. They are usually procumbent, grow along the ground before turning upwards towards the end, but may grow straight upwards. Most often they reach 10 to 80 centimeters (4 to 31 in) in length. The leaves are divided with the ending segments narrow with a fleshy, succulent texture.

The daisy-like flowering heads measure from 3 to 5.5 cm (1.2 to 2.2 in) across. The seeds are achenes that measure 1.8 to 3.5 mm long and can be pale to blackish-brown.

== Taxonomy ==
Tripleurospermum maritimum was given the scientific name Matricaria maritima by Carl Linnaeus in 1753. The botanist Wilhelm Daniel Joseph Koch moved it to the genus Tripleurospermum in 1845 giving the species its accepted name. With the rest of its genus it is part of the family Asteraceae.

=== Names ===
The species name, maritimum, is Botanical Latin derived from mare meaning sea referring to its usual habitat. It is known by the common names false mayweed, sea mayweed, seaside chamomile, or false chamomile.

In Iceland, sea mayweed is known as "Baldr's eyelashes" (baldursbrá), though a similar name, baldersbrår, is used for all mayweed flowers in Sweden.

== Range and habitat ==
According to Plants of the World Online it is native to Europe, Greenland, and the Azores. It grows in all of the Scandinavian countries and the British Isles. South of the Baltic Sea it is native to the Baltic States, Northwest European Russia near St. Petersburg, Poland, and Germany. In the west it is also native to France, Spain, and Portugal.

It usually grows near the ocean in open habitats. On the seashore it grows upper parts of the habitat. It also grows in disused and human disturbed areas.
