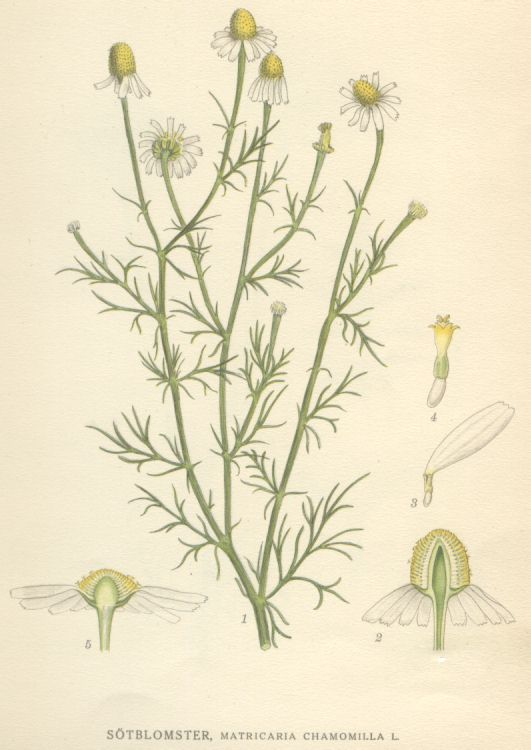
- German chamomile (Matricaria chamomilla)

Scientific classification
- Kingdom: Plantae
- Clade: Embryophytes
- Clade: Tracheophytes
- Clade: Spermatophytes
- Clade: Angiosperms
- Clade: Eudicots
- Clade: Asterids
- Order: Asterales
- Family: Asteraceae
- Subfamily: Asteroideae
- Tribe: Anthemideae
- Genus: Matricaria; L.

Type species
- Matricaria chamomilla L.

Synonyms
- Lepidotheca Nutt.; Cotulina Pomel; Akylopsis Lehm.; Gama La Llave; Cenocline K.Koch; Lepidanthus Nutt.; Camomilla Gilib.; Courrantia Sch.Bip.; Sphaeroclinium (DC.) Sch.Bip.

= Matricaria =

Genus of plants

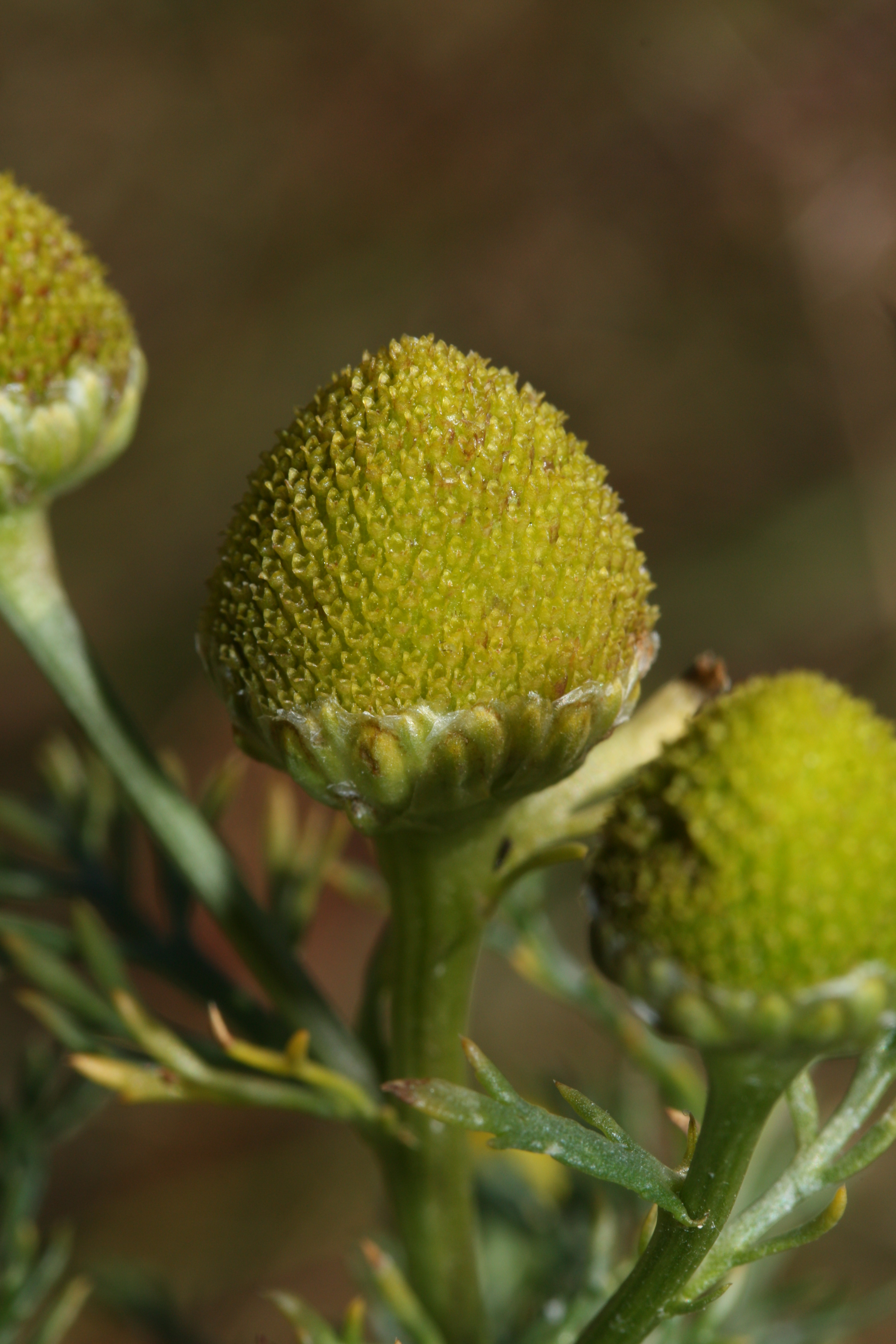
Matricaria discoidea

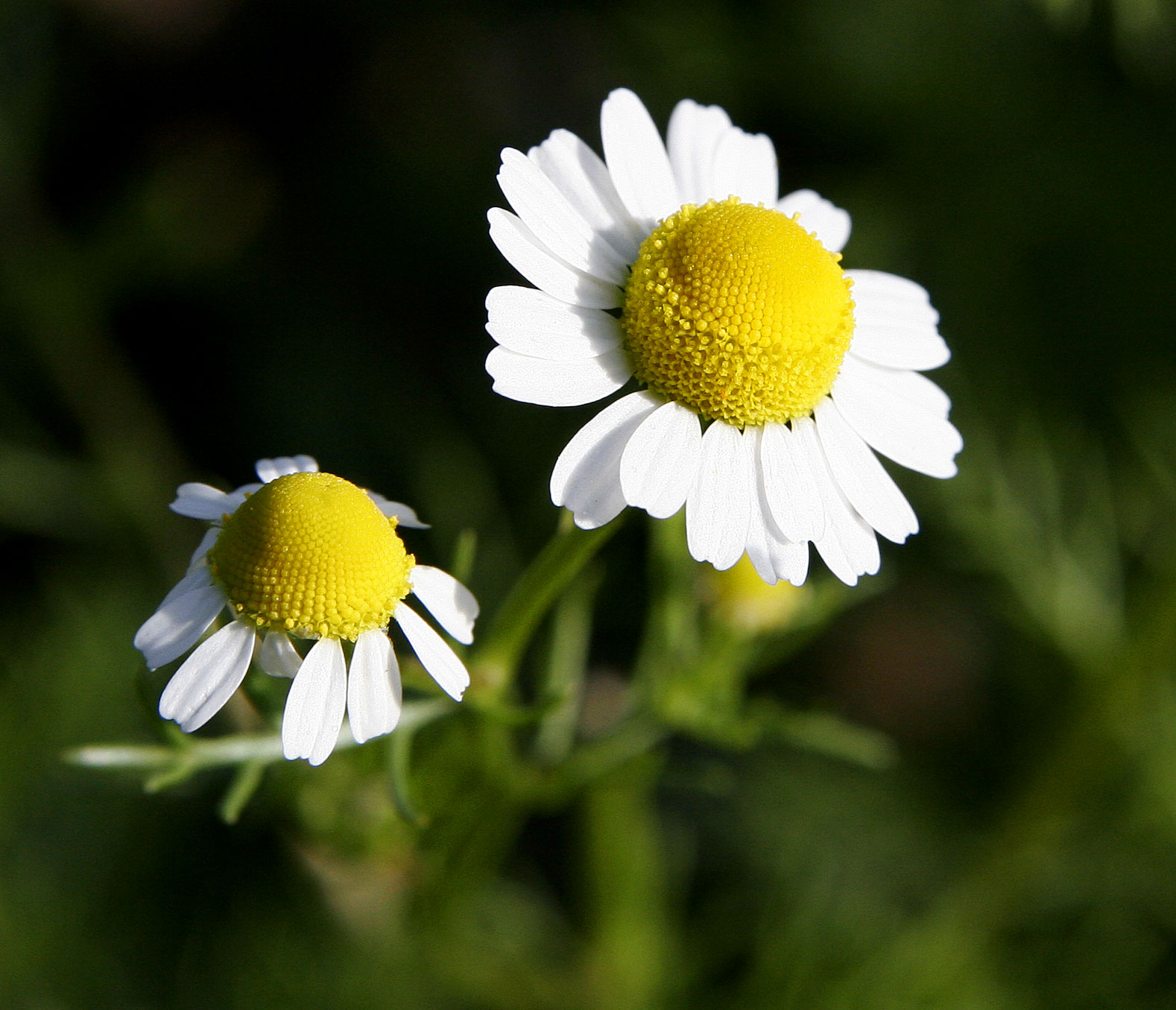
Matricaria chamomilla

Matricaria is a genus of flowering plants in the chamomile tribe within the sunflower family. Some of the species have the common name of "mayweed", but this name also refers to plants not in this genus.

== Description ==
Their many-branched stems are prostrate to erect, glabrous, and very leafy. Their bipinnate leaves have numerous linear, narrowly lobed leaflets.

The flowers are radially symmetrical. The greenish-yellow capitula are semi-spherical. The white ray florets can be present (M. chamomilla) or lacking (M. discoidea). The disc florets are 4- to 5-dentate. The receptacle is 2–3 times as high as wide. The pappus may be crown-shaped and short, or lacking.

== Taxonomy ==
The taxonomy of Matricaria is controversial and very confused. Several species are classified either in Tripleurospermum or Matricaria depending on the interpretation of the author. The distinction is made according to the number of the seed ribs: Tripleurospermum has one adaxial and two lateral seed ribs, while Matricaria has four or five adaxial seed ribs.

Species

- Matricaria aserbaidshanica
- Matricaria aurea
- Matricaria australis
- Matricaria brachyglossa
- Matricaria breviradiata
- Matricaria chamomilla
- Matricaria courrantiana
- Matricaria decipiens
- Matricaria discoidea
- Matricaria elongata
- Matricaria grossheimii
- Matricaria karjaginii
- Matricaria lasiocarpa
- Matricaria matricarioides
- Matricaria occidentalis
- Matricaria rupestris
- Matricaria sevanensis
- Matricaria subpolaris
- Matricaria szowitzii
- Matricaria tetragonosperma
- Matricaria transcaucasica

== Distribution and habitat ==
Most are very common in the temperate regions of Eurasia and North America, as well as in northern and southern Africa, with some also being naturalised in Australia. Matricaria occidentalis is native to North America; other species have been introduced there.

These are hardy, pleasantly aromatic annuals, growing along roadsides in ruderal communities and in fallow land rich in nutrients. Though many are considered nuisance weeds, they are suitable for rock gardens and herb gardens, and as border plants.

== Ecology ==
Matricaria species are used as food plants by the larvae of some Lepidoptera species (caterpillars) including lime-speck pug.

== Uses ==
The extract of Matricaria chamomilla (German chamomile) is taken as a strong tea. It has been used in herbal medicine as a carminative and anti-inflammatory. It is also used in ointments and lotions, and as a mouthwash against infections of mouth and gums. Aromatherapy uses two essential oils of chamomile: the "true chamomile" oil (or German chamomile oil, from M. chamomilla) and the Roman chamomile oil (from Chamaemelum nobile).

== See also ==
- Chamomile
