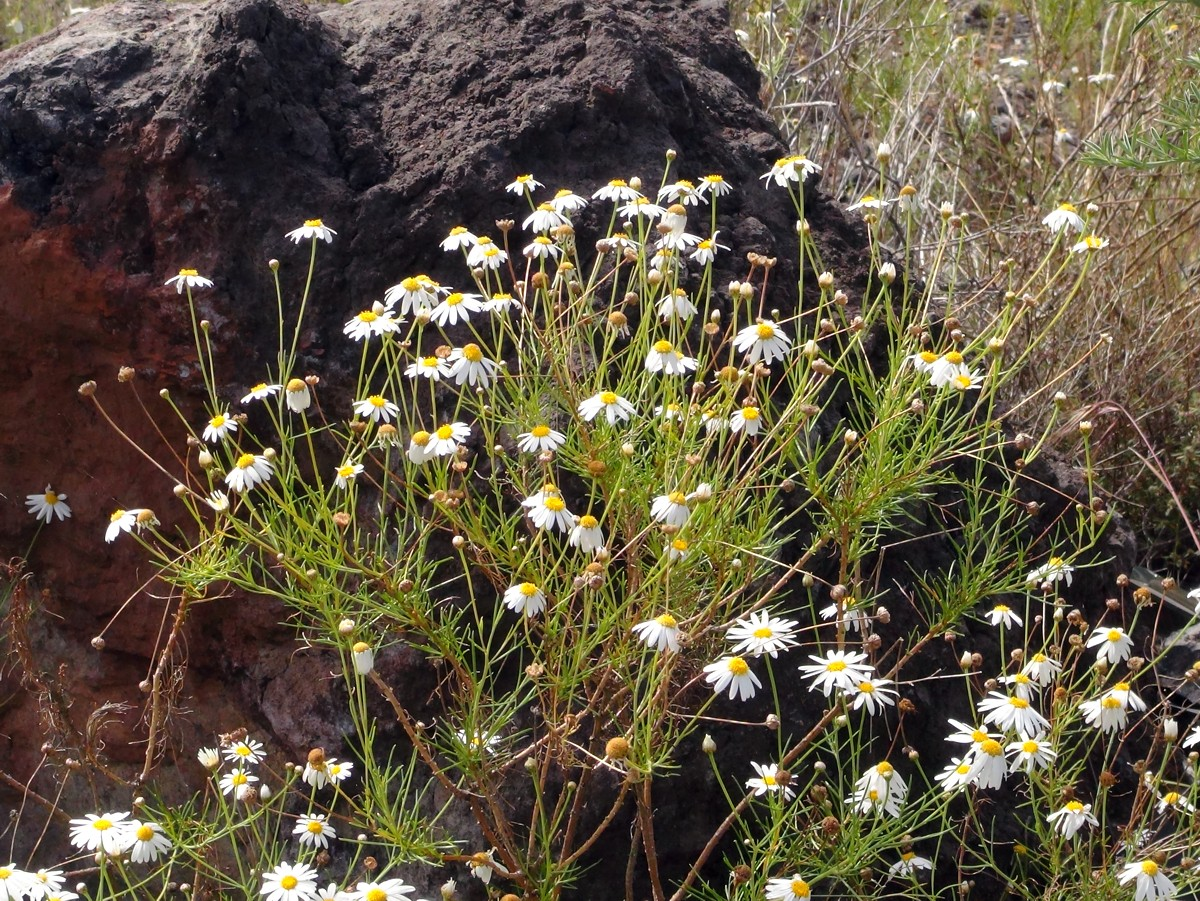
- Argyranthemum gracile in Tenerife

Scientific classification
- Kingdom: Plantae
- Clade: Tracheophytes
- Clade: Angiosperms
- Clade: Eudicots
- Clade: Asterids
- Order: Asterales
- Family: Asteraceae
- Tribe: Anthemideae
- Subtribe: Glebionidinae; Oberpr. & Vogt

Genera
- See text.

Synonyms
- Chrysantheminae Bremer & Humphries, nom. illeg.

= Glebionidinae =

Subtribe of flowering plants

Glebionidinae is a small subtribe of flowering plants in the tribe Anthemideae of the family Asteraceae. Its members include species used in the production of garden marguerites.

== Description ==
Members of the subtribe are either subshrubs (Argyranthemum) or annual herbs (the remaining genera). The genus Heteranthemis has glandular hairs; the others either lack hairs or have non-glandular hairs. The flower heads (capitula) are solitary or arranged in loose corymbs. The ray florets are female, the long petal (ligule) usually being white or yellow. The disc florets are bisexual with a five-lobed corolla. The achenes of the ray florets are three-angled and have two or three wings; those of the disc florets are flattened and have one or two wings.

== Taxonomy ==
The subtribe was first proposed in 1993 by Bremer and Humphries, under the name "Chrysantheminae". The name was validly published at the time, but two annual species placed in the tribe, which were then known as Chrysanthemum coronarium and Chrysanthemum segetum, are now placed in Glebionis. (The genus Chrysanthemum is now used for perennial Asian species, such as the conserved type C. indicum.) Hence Chrysantheminae Bremer & Humphries became a later homonym of Chrysantheminae Less. and so illegitimate. In 2007, Oberprieler and Vogt provided a new name, Glebionidinae, based on the genus Glebionis, whose type species is Glebionis coronaria, formerly Chrysanthemum coronarium.

=== Genera ===
The subtribe includes seven genera:

- Argyranthemum Webb, 23 species
- Endopappus Sch.Bip., one species
- Glebionis Cass., two species
- Heteranthemis Schott, one species
- Ismelia Cass., one species
- Nivellea B.H.Wilcox, K.Bremer & Humphries, one species
- Otoglyphis Pomel (synonym Aaronsohnia Warb. & Eig), two species

Intergeneric hybrids are known:

- ×Argyrimelia J.M.H.Shaw = Argyranthemum × Ismelia – artificial hybrids
- ×Glebianthemum J.M.Watson & A.R.Flores = Argyranthemum × Glebionis – artificial and spontaneous hybrids
  - ×Glebianthemum valinianum J.M.Watson & A.R.Flores = A. frutescens × G. coronaria – discovered in Chile where both parents were naturalized and grew together; also produced artificially
- Glebionis × Ismelia – artificial hybrids
Species and hybrids

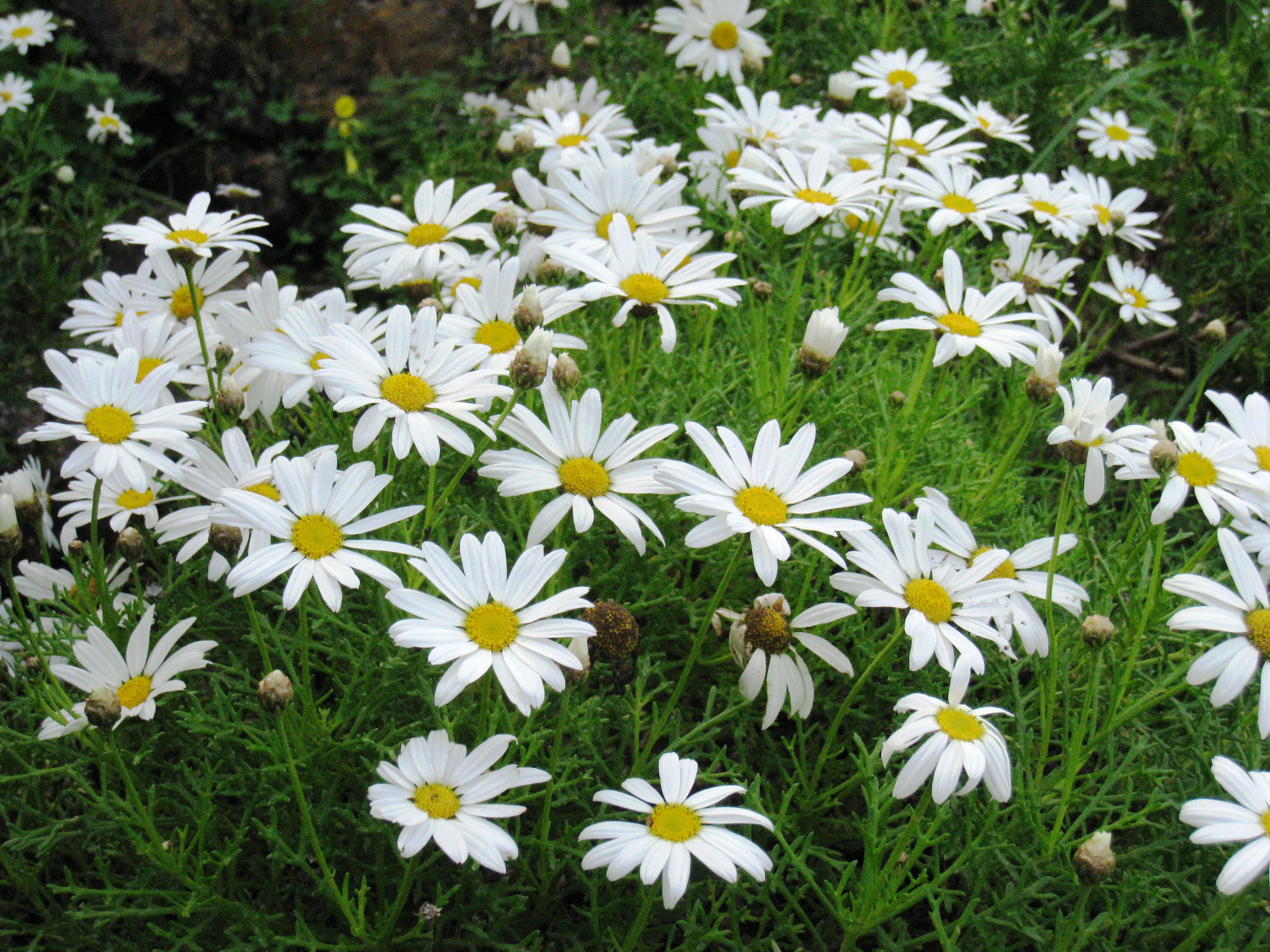
Argyranthem frutescens

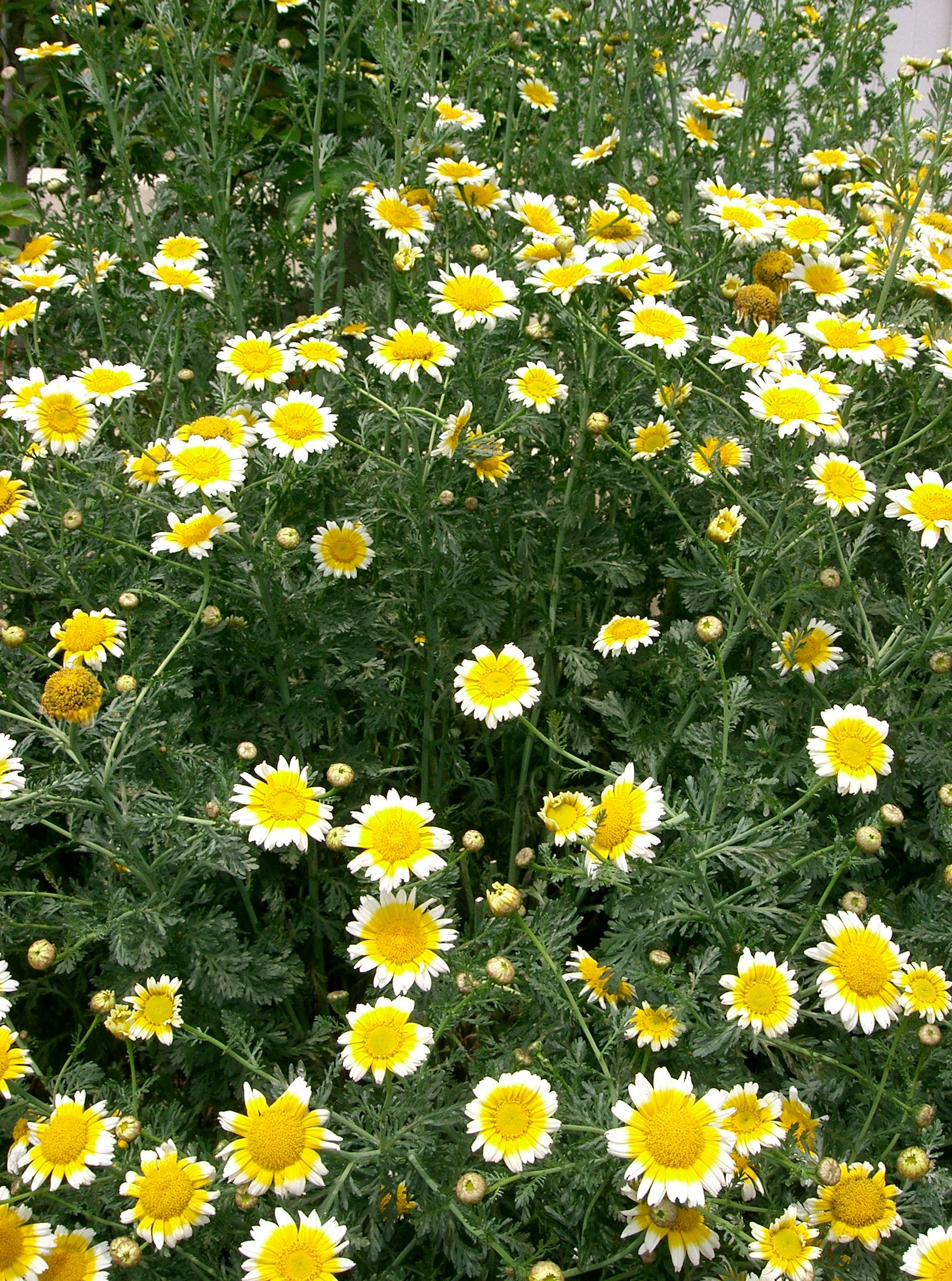
Glebionis coronaria var. discolor

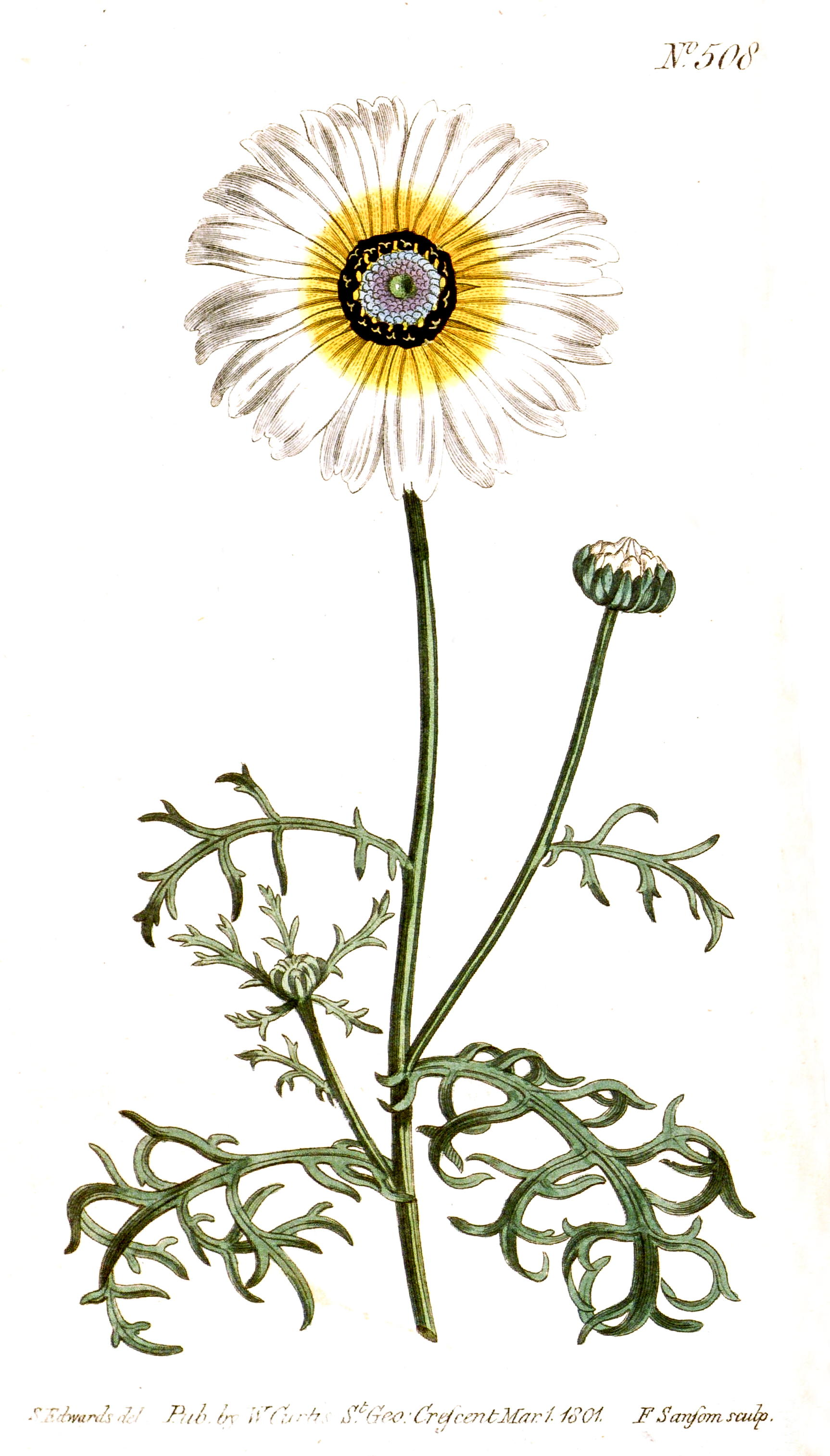
Illustration of Ismelia carinata

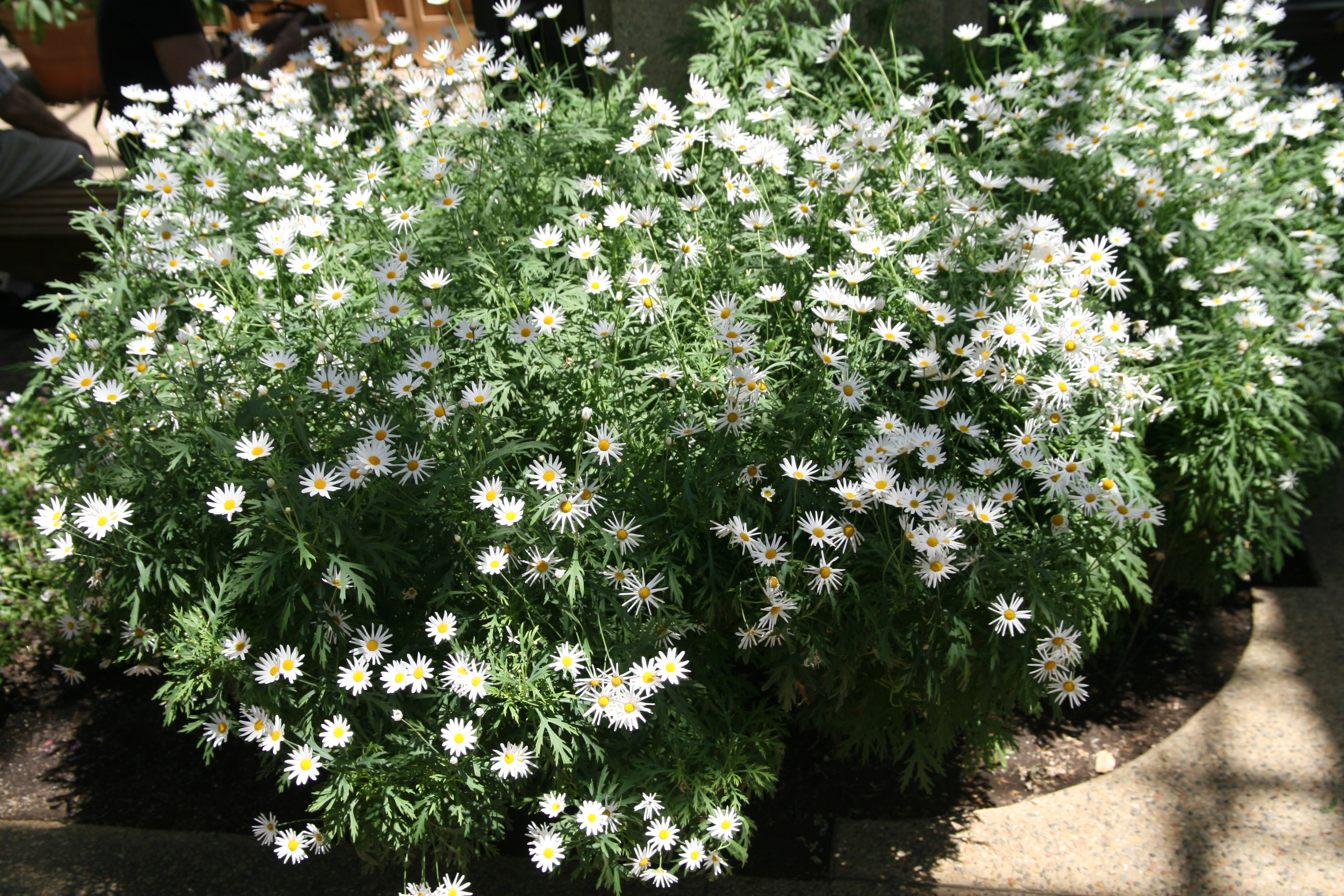
Garden marguerite 'Vera'

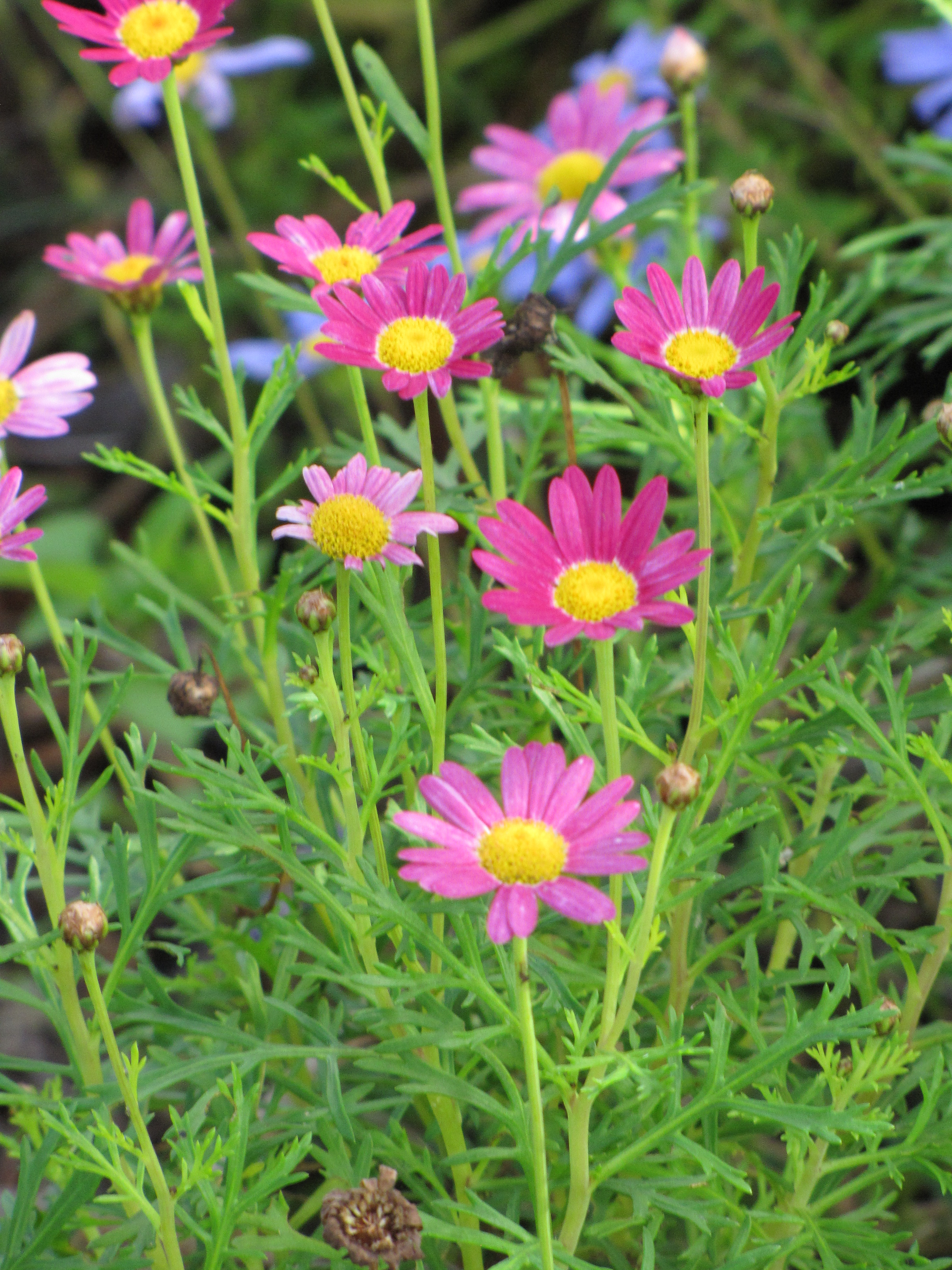
Hybrid garden marguerite

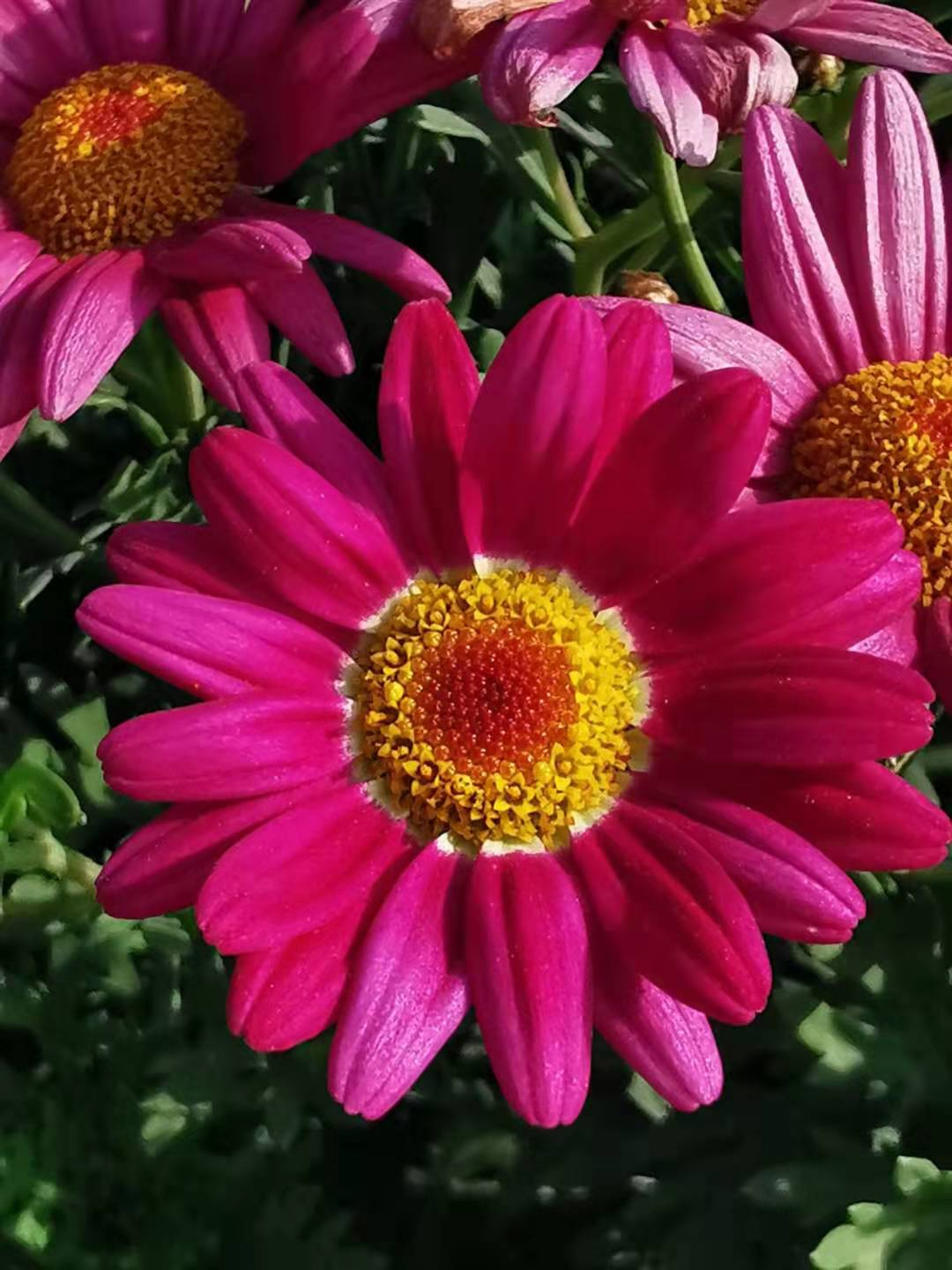
Hybrid garden marguerite

=== Phylogeny ===
A 2007 molecular phylogenetic study of the tribe Anthemideae found the subtribe Glebionidinae to be the most deeply nested. One species from each of the genera was included, producing the relationships within the subtribe shown below.

- Glebionidinae
  - Heteranthemis viscidehirta
  - - Argyranthemum foeniculaceum
    - - Glebionis coronaria
      - Ismelia carinata

The apparently close relationship between Glebionis and Ismelia is reflected in the decision by some sources to sink I. carinata into Glebionis as G. carinata.

== Distribution ==
Genera belonging to the subtribe are native to Macaronesia, Europe, northern Africa and southwestern Asia.

== Cultivation ==
Argyranthemum species, particularly Argyranthemum frutescens, have been in cultivation since at least the early 1700s. Ismelia carinata, sometimes known as the annual chrysanthemum, is also cultivated. Particularly since the 1960s, intergeneric hybrids among the members of the subtribe have been used to introduce flowers of varied colours and forms into garden marguerites, used as bedding and container plants.
