= Garden marguerite =

Plant cultivar

Garden marguerites
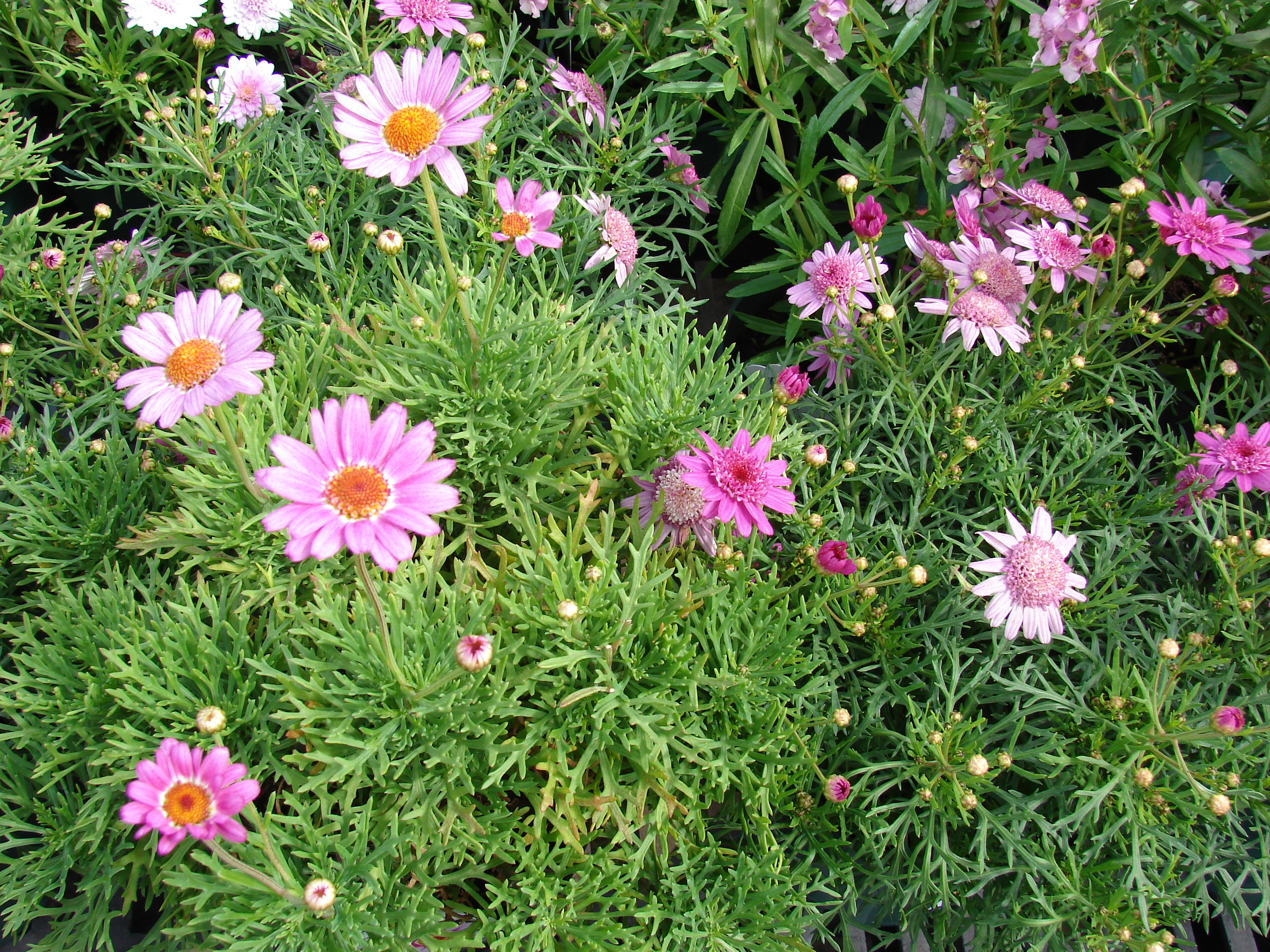
- Pink cultivar
- Family: Asteraceae
- Subfamily: Asteroideae
- Tribe: Anthemideae
- Subtribe: Glebionidinae
- Informal group: Garden marguerites
- Origin: Mostly artificial hybrids involving Argyranthemum, including intergeneric crosses

Garden marguerites, also known as marguerite daisies, are cultivars of plants in the subtribe Glebionidinae of the family Asteraceae, the great majority being hybrids created in cultivation. One of the genera belonging to the subtribe, Argyranthemum, was introduced into cultivation from the Canary Islands in the 18th century, and modern cultivars are mostly sold and grown under the genus name Argyranthemum or the species name Argyranthemum frutescens, although many are actually intergeneric hybrids. The first such hybrids involved species now placed in the genus Glebionis, but other crosses within the subtribe are known. Breeding has aimed at introducing flower heads in varied colours and shapes while retaining the shrubby habit of Argyranthemum. Garden marguerites are used as summer bedding or grown in containers. Most are only half-hardy. They can be trained into shapes such as pyramids or grown as standards.

== Description ==
Garden marguerites are derived from wild species in the family Asteraceae. They have the typical inflorescences of the family, in which what may appear to be a single flower is actually a composite flower head composed of many individual flowers or florets. Small tightly packed florets make up the central disc, which is surrounded by florets with longer petals (ligules), making up the rays of the complete flower head. In wild Argyranthemum species, which form the basis of garden marguerites, the flower heads have yellow centres and usually white rays, although A. maderense has pale yellow rays. Modern cultivars have much more varied flower colours and shapes. The central disc may remain yellow, be of the same colour as the ray florets, or be of a different colour. The central disc florets are enlarged in some cultivars. In fully double flower heads, the disk florets have longer petals like the ray florets. The cultivar 'Supa594' (Summersong White) has flower heads in which no central disc is visible, as all florets have ray-like petals.

Variation in flower head colour and form

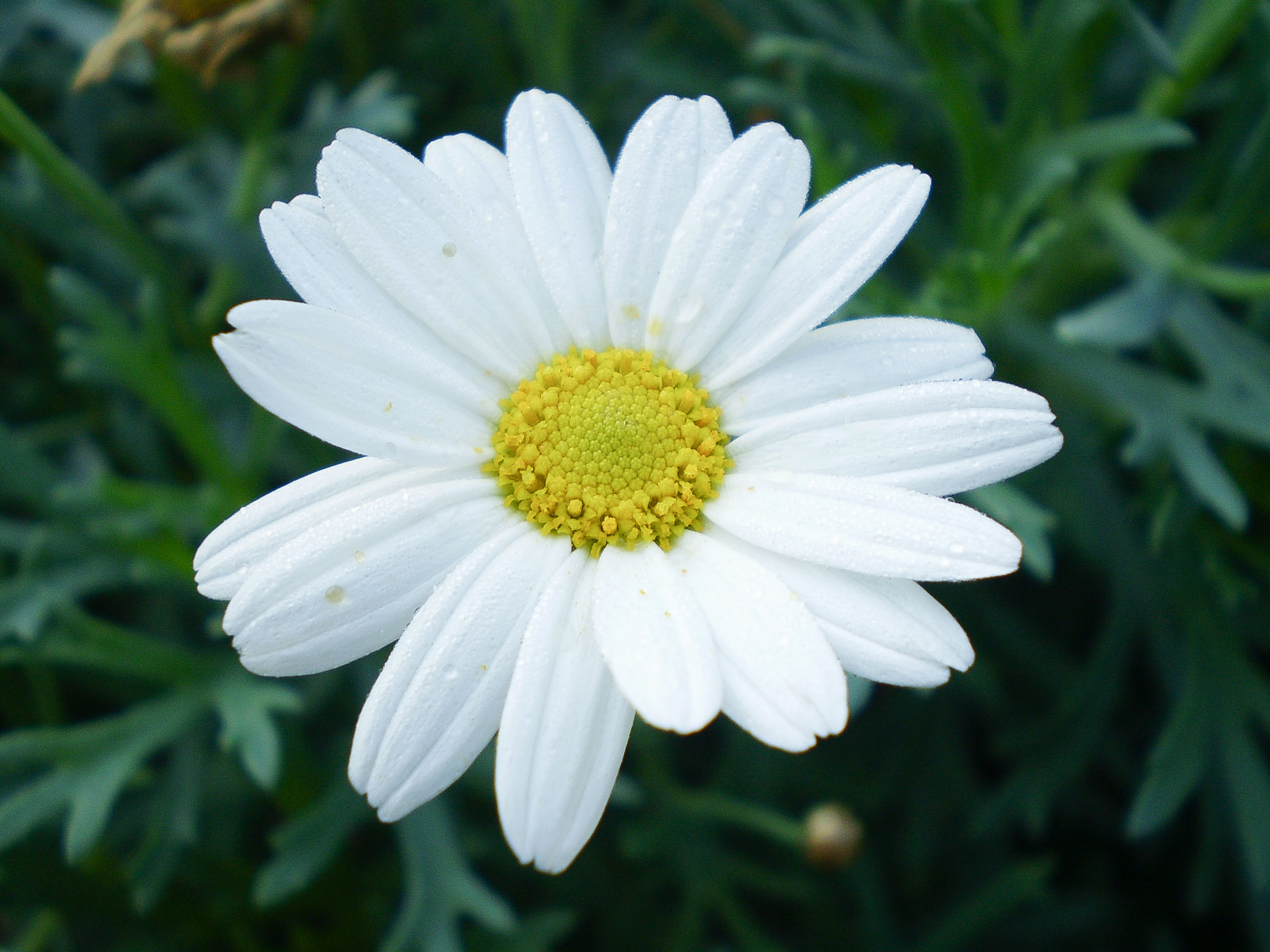
Wild-type flower head

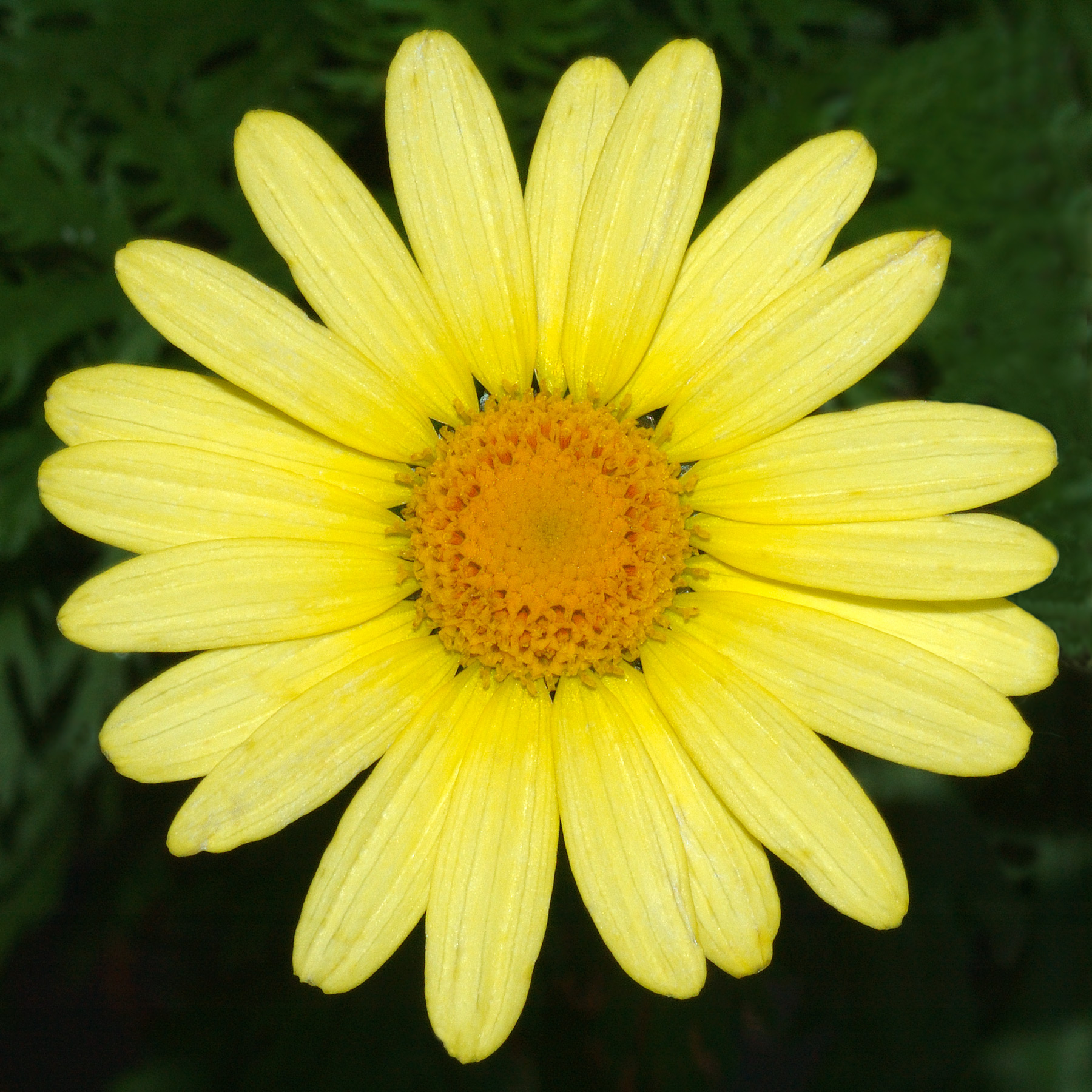
Wild-type flower head, similar to Argyranthemum maderense

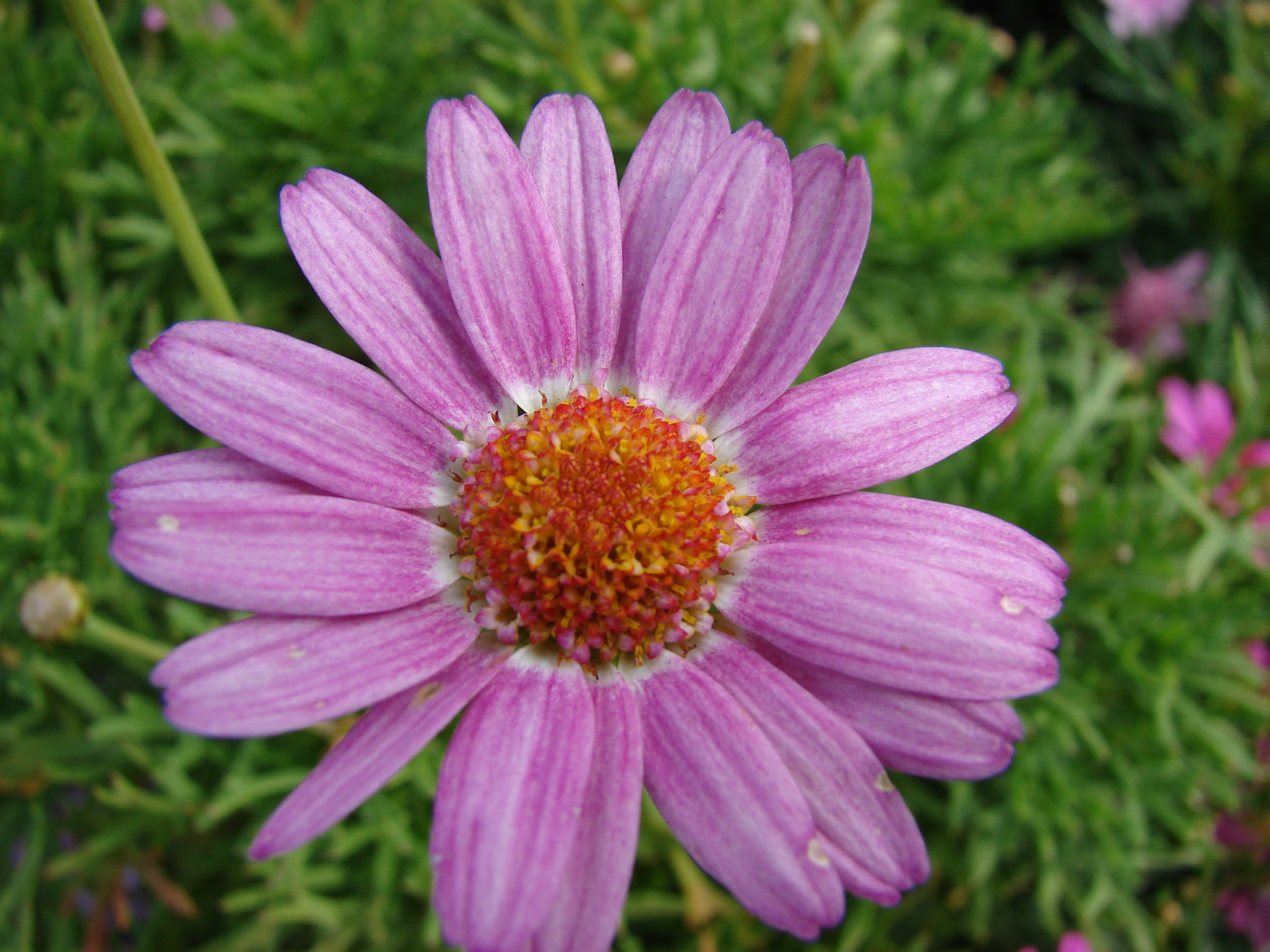
Brownish central florets, pink rays

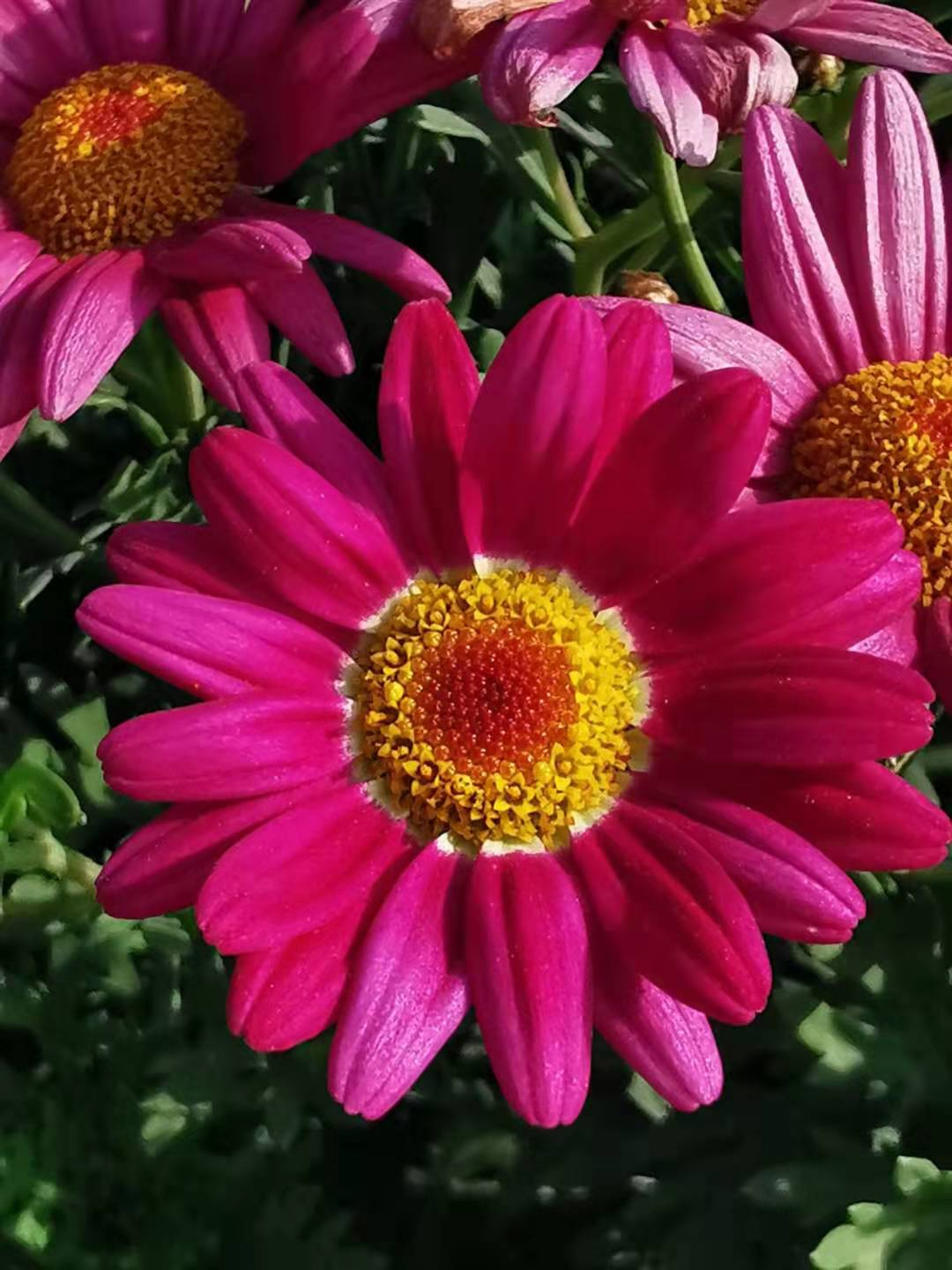
Red rays; resembles 'Bonmadcher'

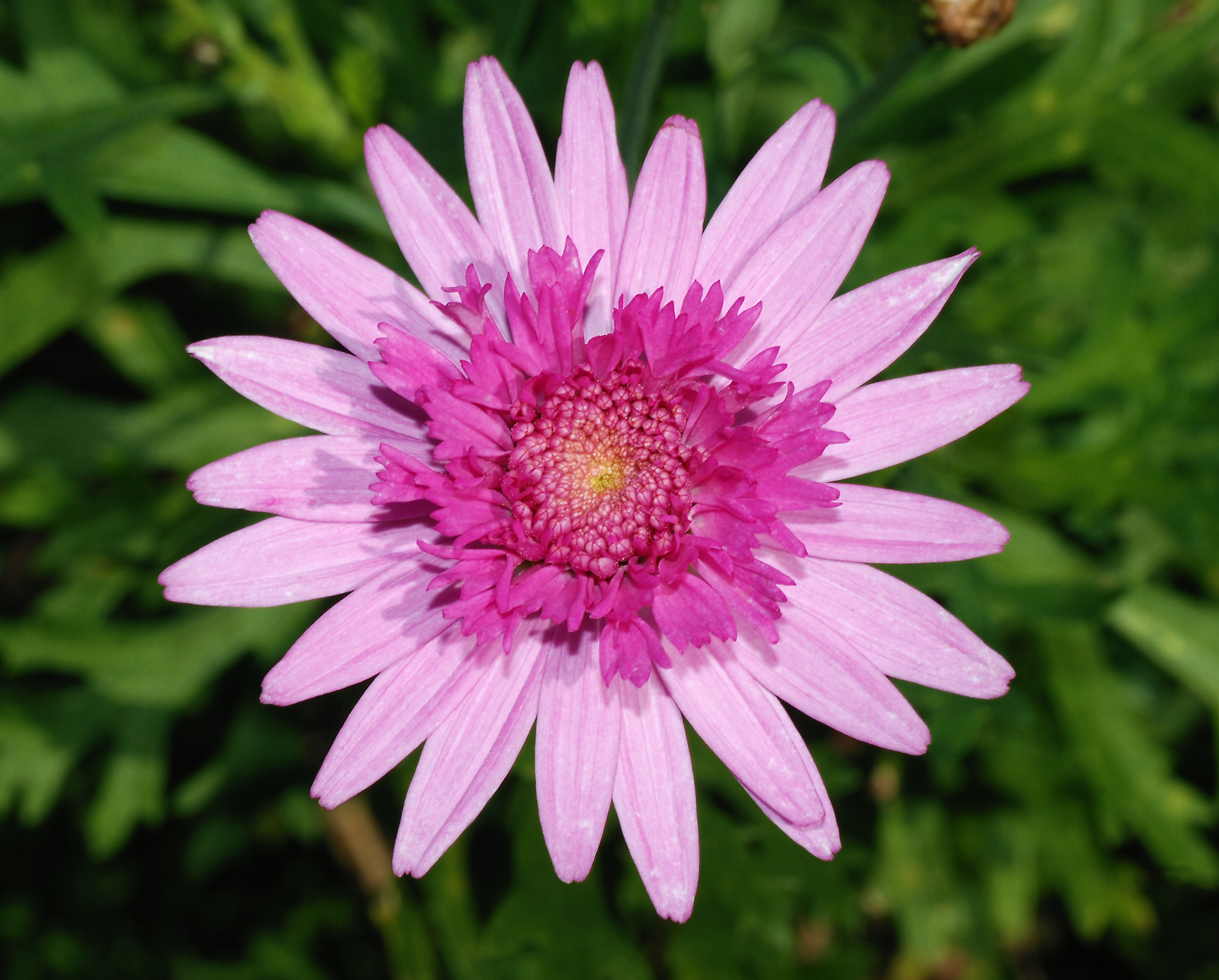
Enlarged deeper pink central florets, pink rays

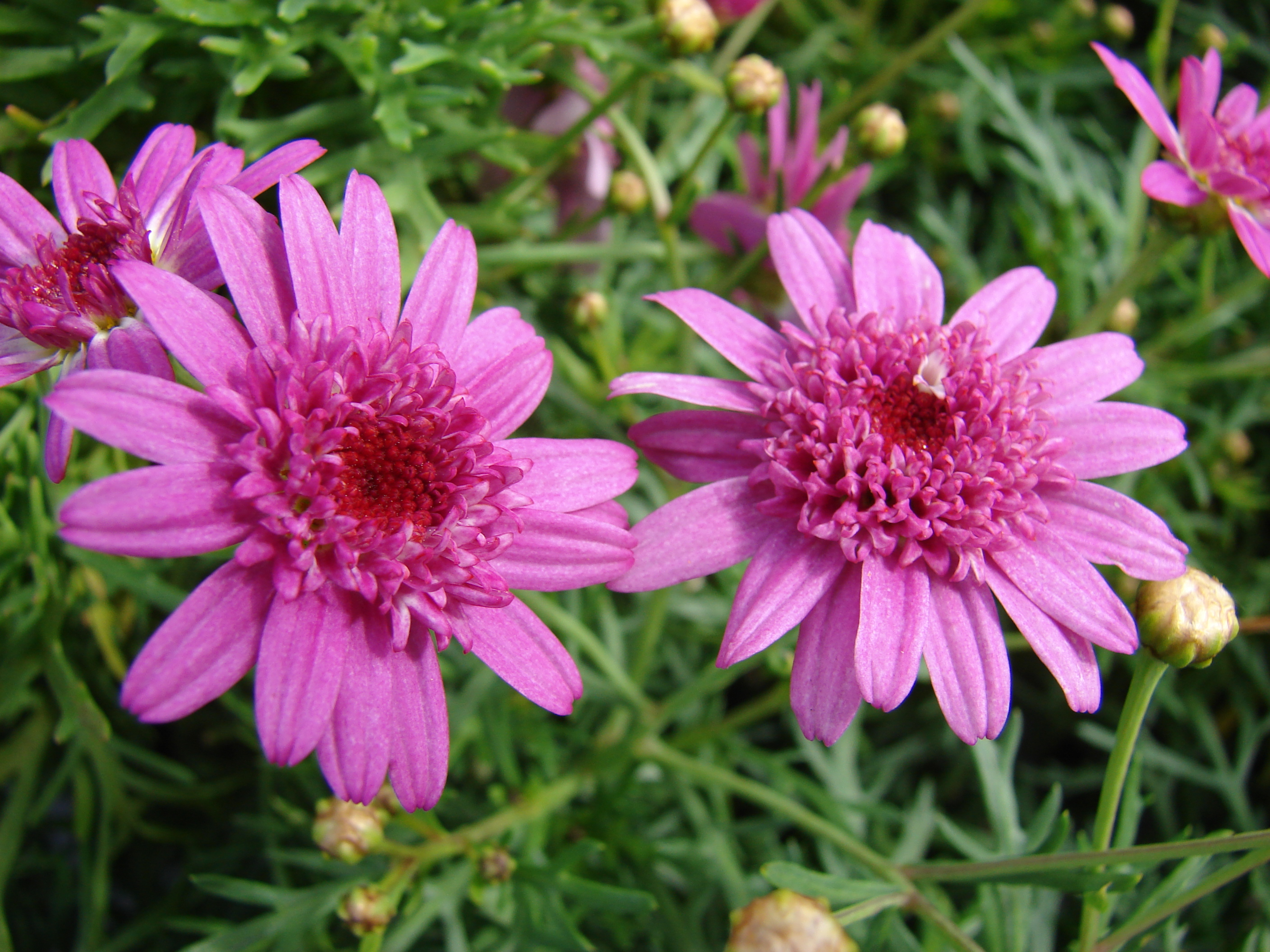
Enlarged central florets, all pink

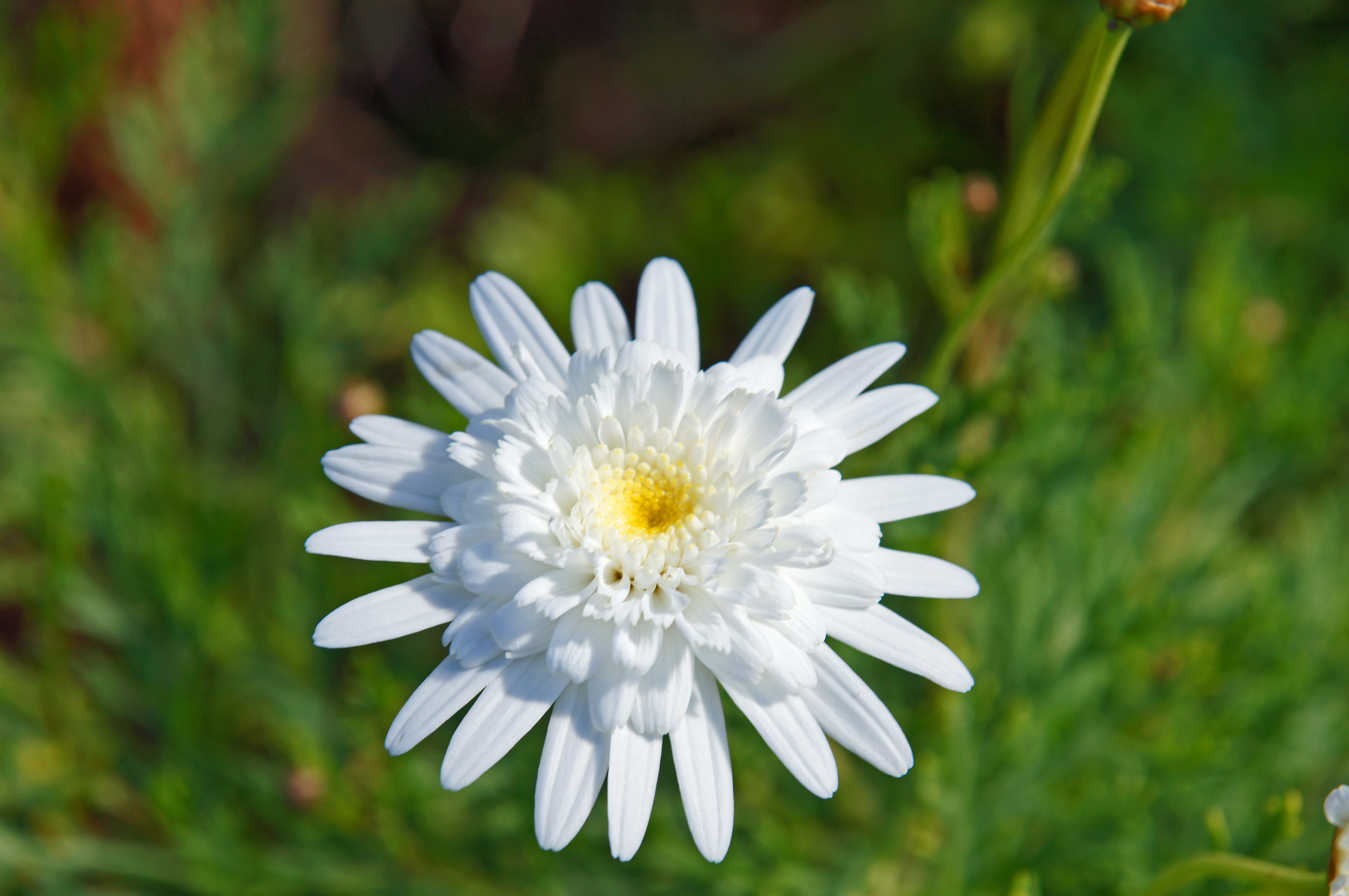
Enlarged central florets, all white; flower head almost fully double

Argyranthemum has a shrubby perennial habit. Cultivars may be derived from crosses with related annual species, such as Glebionis coronaria. Such crosses may produce either annual or perennial offspring, but breeders try to retain the Argyranthemum habit. Some cultivars, such as 'Sugar Button', are short-lived and are usually grown as annuals. Most are perennial, ranging in height from about 30 cm (1 ft) for the cultivar 'Snow Storm' to about 120 cm (4 ft) for the cultivar 'Starlight'.

Growth habits

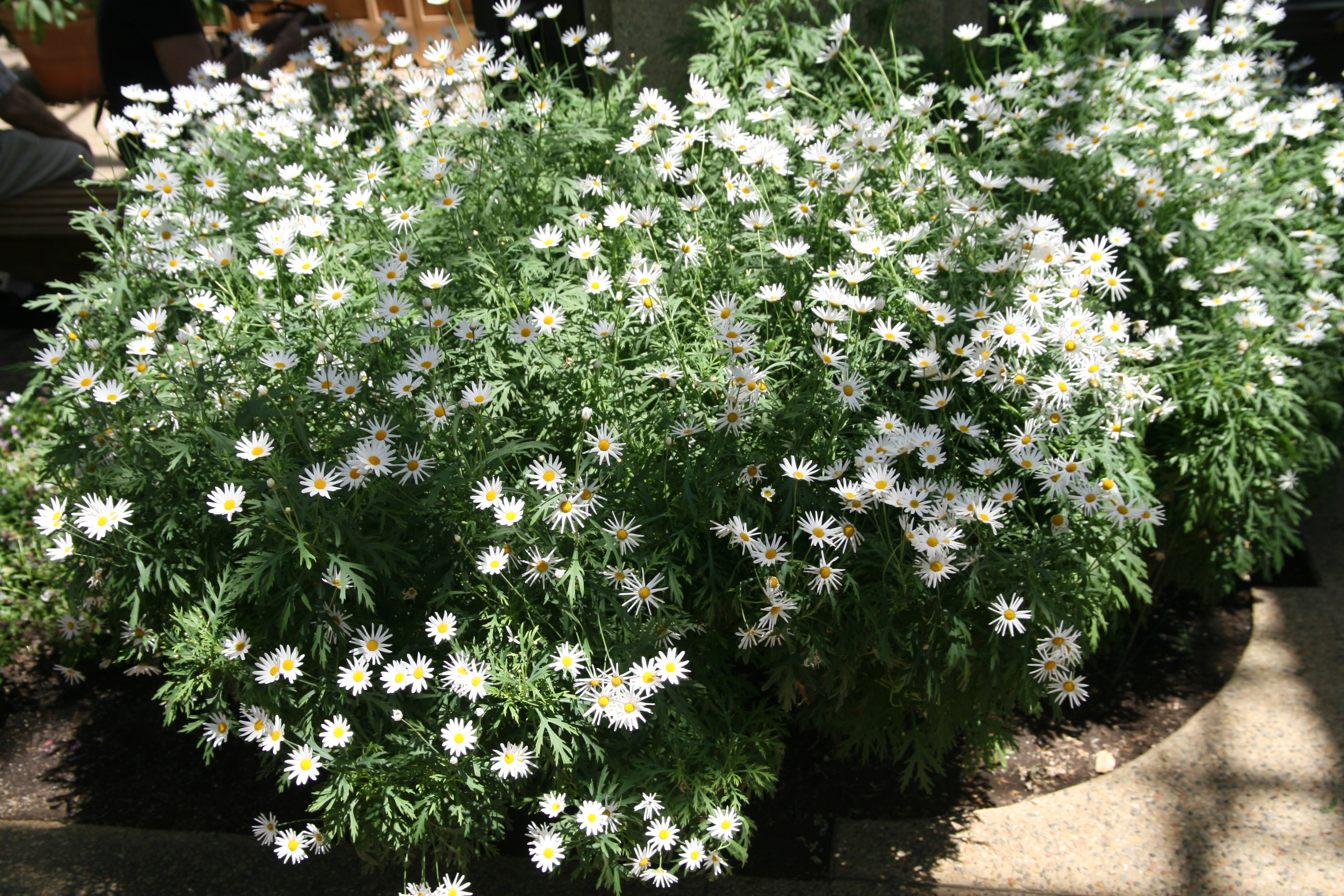
'Vera' in Pennsylvania

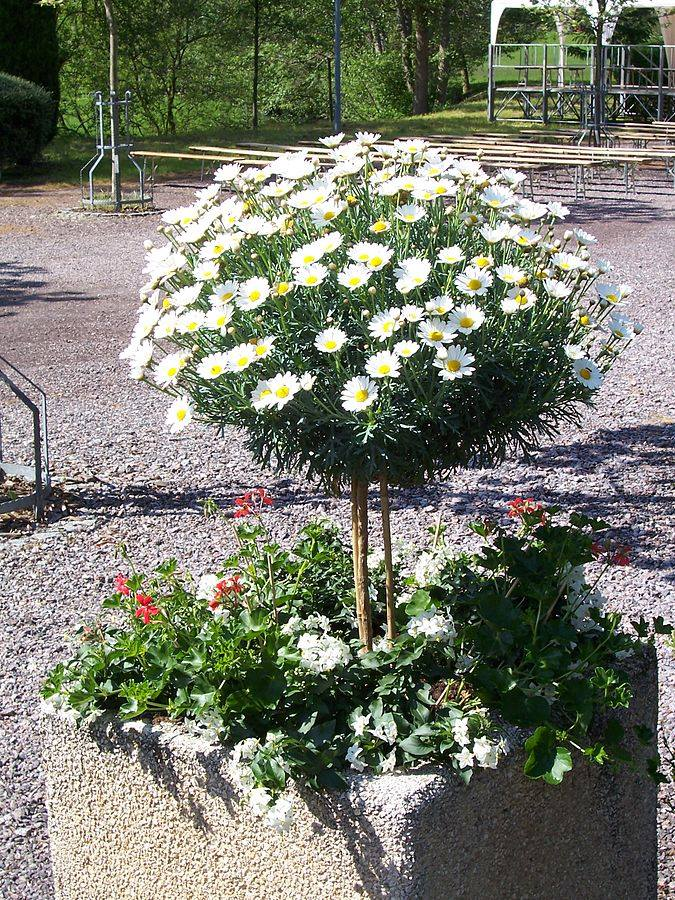
Grown as a standard

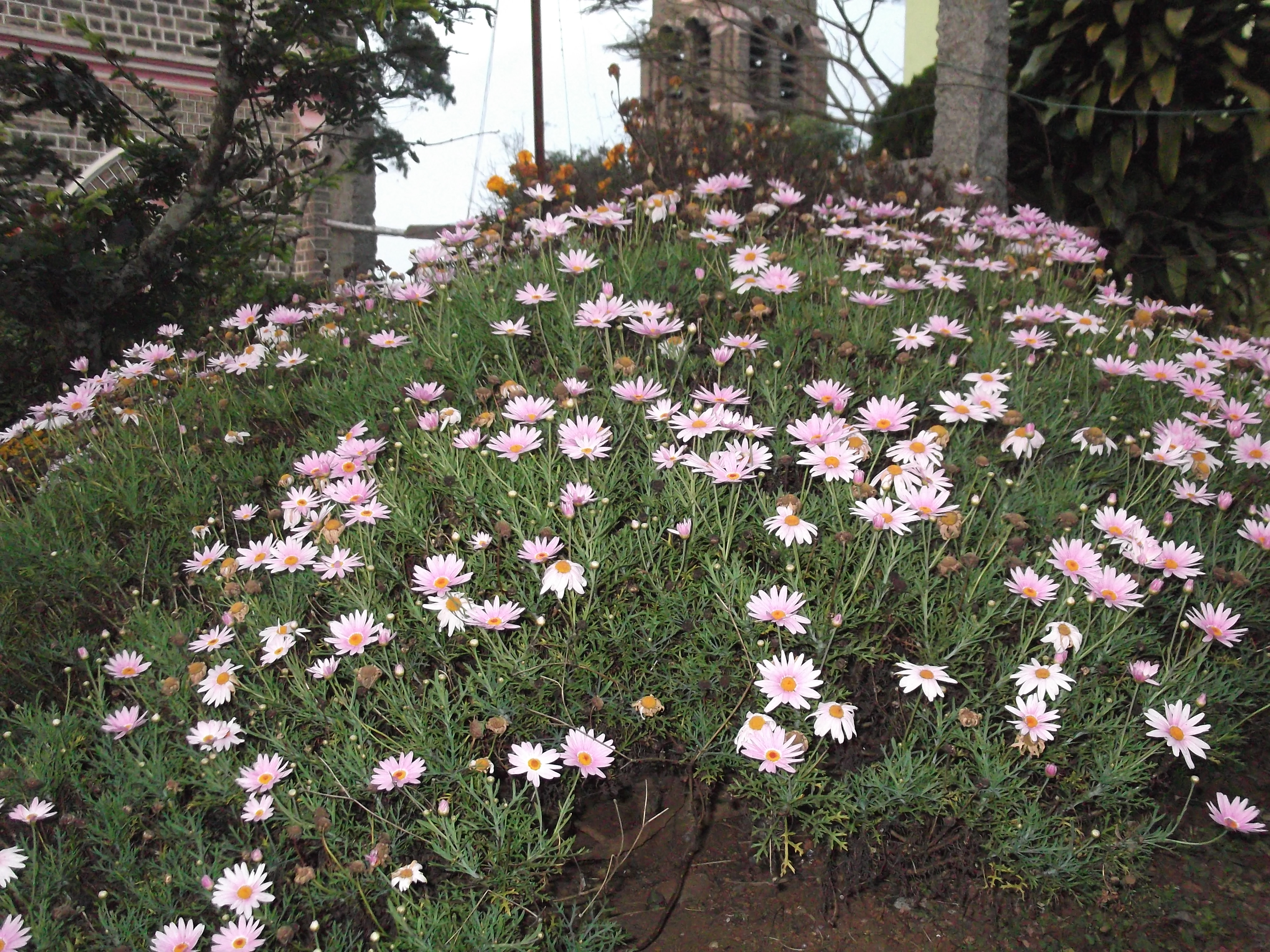
In cultivation in India

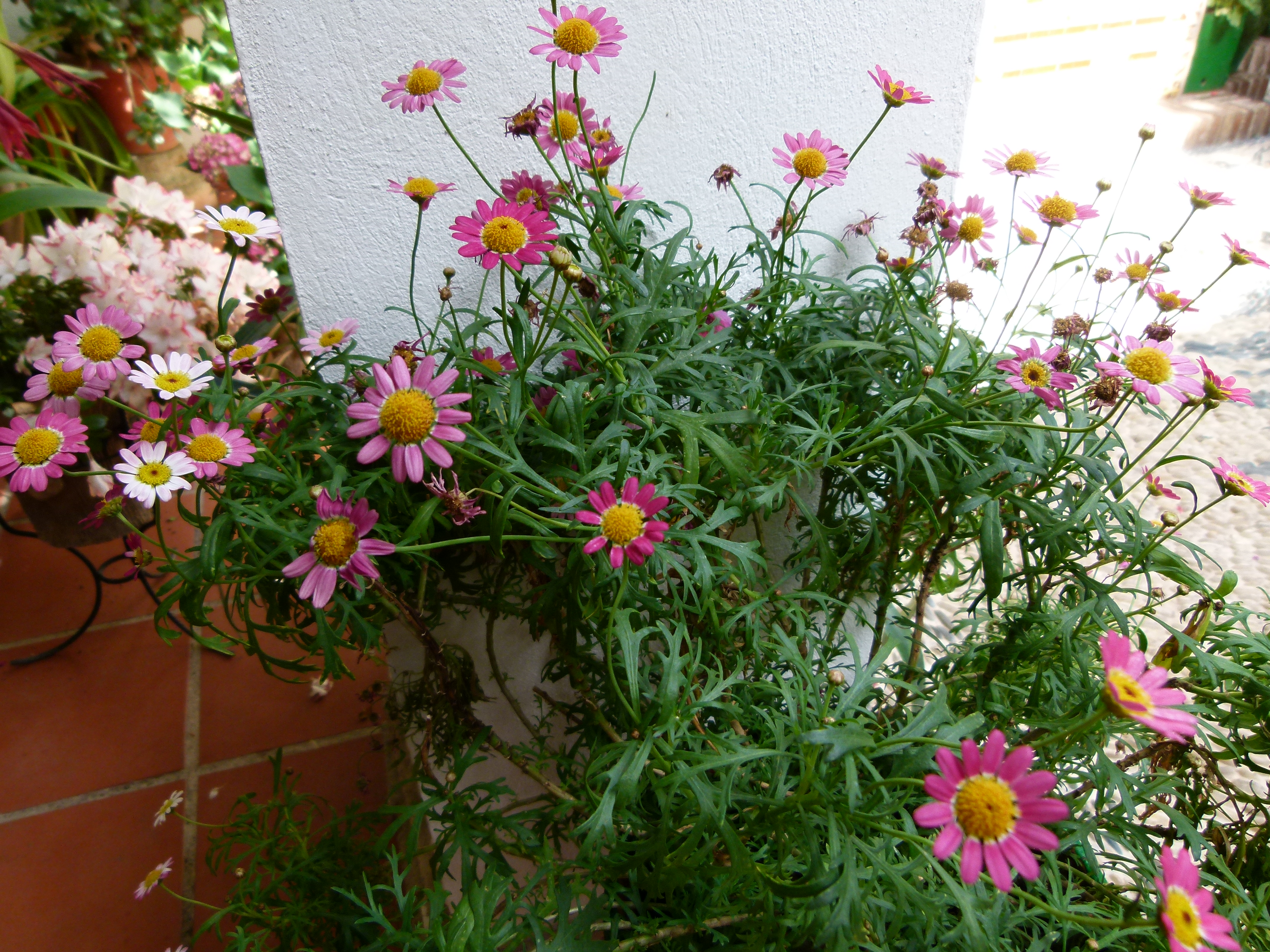
As a patio plant in Spain

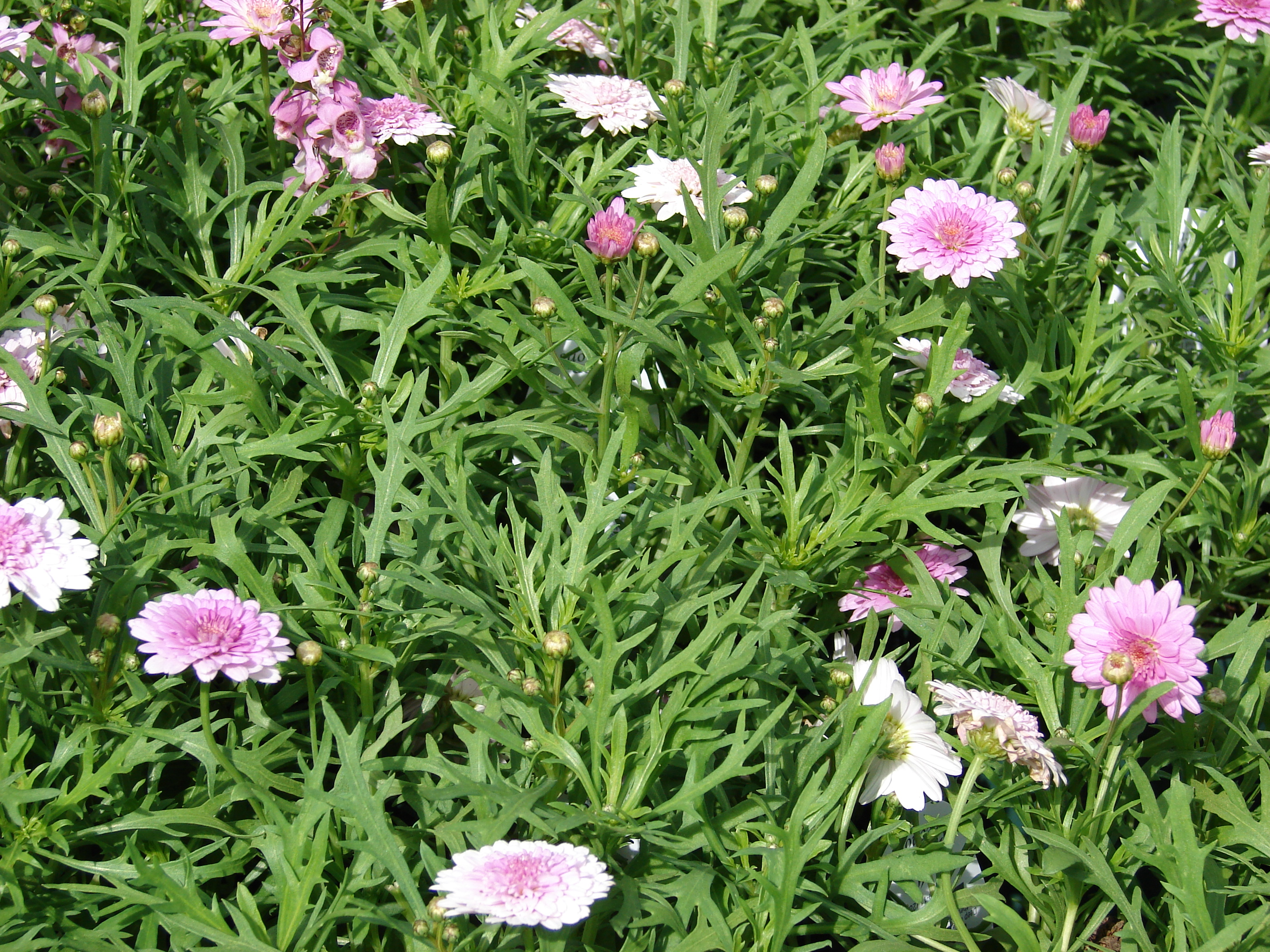
Foliage and flowers of 'Summer Melody'

== Genera involved ==
The subtribe Glebionidinae consists of four genera, or three if Ismelia is included in Glebionis.

- Argyranthemum Webb – about 23 species
- Glebionis Cass. – 2 or 3 species
- Heteranthemis Schott – 1 species, Heteranthemis viscidi-hirta
- Ismelia Cass. – 1 species, Ismelia carinata, which may alternatively be included in Glebionis as Glebionis carinata

Hybrids between the genera are origin of many cultivars, although in some cases their parents are conjectural. Three main crosses have been documented:

- ×Argyrimelia J.M.H.Shaw = Argyranthemum × Ismelia
- ×Glebianthemum J.M.Watson & A.R.Flores = Argyranthemum × Glebionis
- Glebionis × Ismelia

The hybrid between A. frutescens and G. coronaria, named ×Glebianthemum valinianum, was discovered in Chile where both parents were naturalized and grew together.

== Origins and development ==
The genus Argyranthemum is native to Macaronesia (the Canary Islands, Madeira and the Savage Islands), where about 23 species are known, although some species have been introduced worldwide. Argyranthemum frutescens was listed as being in cultivation in the Chelsea Physic Garden in a publication dated to between 1710 and 1714, although it may have been introduced earlier, as there are reports of 1699 for the Oxford Botanic Garden. Cultivated Argyranthemum frutescens reached Japan from Europe in the 1860s, with over 100 cultivars known in Japan by 1912. In the UK, the National Plant Collection for this group contained over 100 cultivars in 1993.

It was discovered in Japan in particular that Argyranthemum crosses readily with species of Glebionis (once included in Chrysanthemum). Glebionis and the related Ismelia (sometimes included in Glebionis) are found in Europe and around the Mediterranean. Intergeneric hybrids, such as the cultivar 'Izu Yellow', were known by the 1960s. The purpose of making such crosses was to produce more varied flower colours and forms along with desirable plant growth habits. Colours such as orange and reddish brown, not seen in the parents, were obtained by crossing Argyranthemum cultivars with either Ismelia carinata or Glebionis coronaria.

Because modern cultivars are often the end product of many generations of multiple crosses, determining their origin and so tracing their development is difficult. Identification of the parents of cultivars has involved both morphological characters and, more recently, genetic markers. The scent of the crushed leaves of G. coronaria is distinctive; I. carinata has more finely dissected leaves than Argyranthemum. Genetic markers were able to distinguish the different intergeneric hybrids and showed that cultivars with similar characteristics shared parents.

Cultivars probably derived from crosses between Argyranthemum and Ismelia carinata (×Argyrimelia) include:

- Many of the GranDaisy series, with cultivar names such as 'Bonmax 9163' or 'Bonmax 14143', and selling names such as GranDaisy Pink or GranDaisy Deep Red
- The Queen Series, such as 'Canary Queen' – light yellow flowers; 'Carnival Queen' – yellow flowers; 'Furenka' – white flowers; 'Garnet Queen' – deep red flowers; 'Peach Queen' – orange and yellow flowers; 'Queenmais' – pink and yellow flowers; 'Ruby Queen' – red flowers
- Some of the Aramis Series, such as 'Aramis Fire' and 'Bonmadcher' (Madeira Cherry Red)
- Genetic markers suggested that some other cultivars have the same origin as the Queen Series: 'Faery White' – white flowers; 'Faery Light Pink' – pink rays.

Cultivars probably derived from crosses between Argyranthemum and Glebionis (×Glebianthemum) include:

- 'Chrysaster' – an early North American selection, possibly Argyranthemum frutescens × Glebionis coronaria = ×Glebianthemum valinianum
- 'Izu Yellow' – genetic markers support this being A. frutescens × G. coronaria
- Others may belong here, such as 'Kibana Margarette'; 'Peach Cheeks' – dark centre, two tone yellow rays; 'Zairai Ki' – yellow rays

== Cultivation ==
Garden marguerites can be used as bedding, in which case they may be treated as annuals, or grown in containers. In the UK climate, they are generally half-hardy, although they may survive a few degrees of frost in a sheltered position. It is recommended that young plants should not be planted out until all danger of frost has passed. Plants can be pruned to keep them in shape, and can be trained into pyramids or standards. Propagation is by cuttings, which root easily, or in some cases by seed.

=== Awards ===
Two naturally occurring taxa and the following cultivars have gained the Royal Horticultural Society's Award of Garden Merit:

- Argyranthemum frutescens subsp. canariae – yellow centre, white rays
- Argyranthemum maderense – yellow centre, lemon-yellow rays
- 'Argydowitis' (Molimba XL Duplo White) – centre yellow in bud, opening white with yellow tips, rays white
- 'Bonmadcher' (Madeira Cherry Red) – centre starts orange-red-brown in bud and turns yellow as the florets open, rays cherry red with white bases, ageing to purple
- 'Chelsea Girl' – yellow centre, white rays; finely divided foliage; cultivar of Argyranthemum gracile
- 'Cornish Gold' – yellow centre, yellow rays
- 'Donington Hero' – yellow centre, white rays
- 'Jamaica Primrose' - yellow centre, primrose yellow rays
- 'Kleaf07028' (Larita White Beauty) – yellow centre, white rays
- 'Kleaf10057' (Larita Banana Split) – brown to yellow centre, pale yellow rays with blotches and speckles of red
- 'Levada Cream' – yellow centre, light yellow rays fading to cream
- 'Mary Cheek' – double, all light pink
- 'Petite Pink' – yellow centre, pink rays
- 'Qinta White' – anemone-centred, all white
- 'Royal Haze' – yellow centre, white rays; cultivar of Argyranthemum foeniculaceum
- 'Snow Storm' – yellow centre, white rays
- 'Starlight' – fully double, all white, outer ray florets narrowly tubular
- 'Sugar Button' – yellow centre, white rays
- 'Supa594' (Summersong White) – fully double, all white
- 'Supacher' (Cherry Love) – double, all bright pink
- 'Supalem' (Sultan's Lemon) – centre yellow, rays pale lemon-yellow
- 'Vancouver' – anemone-centred, all pink
- 'Whiteknights' – yellow centre, white rays

== Bibliography ==
- Cheek, R. (1993), "La belle marguerite", The Garden, 118: 350–355
