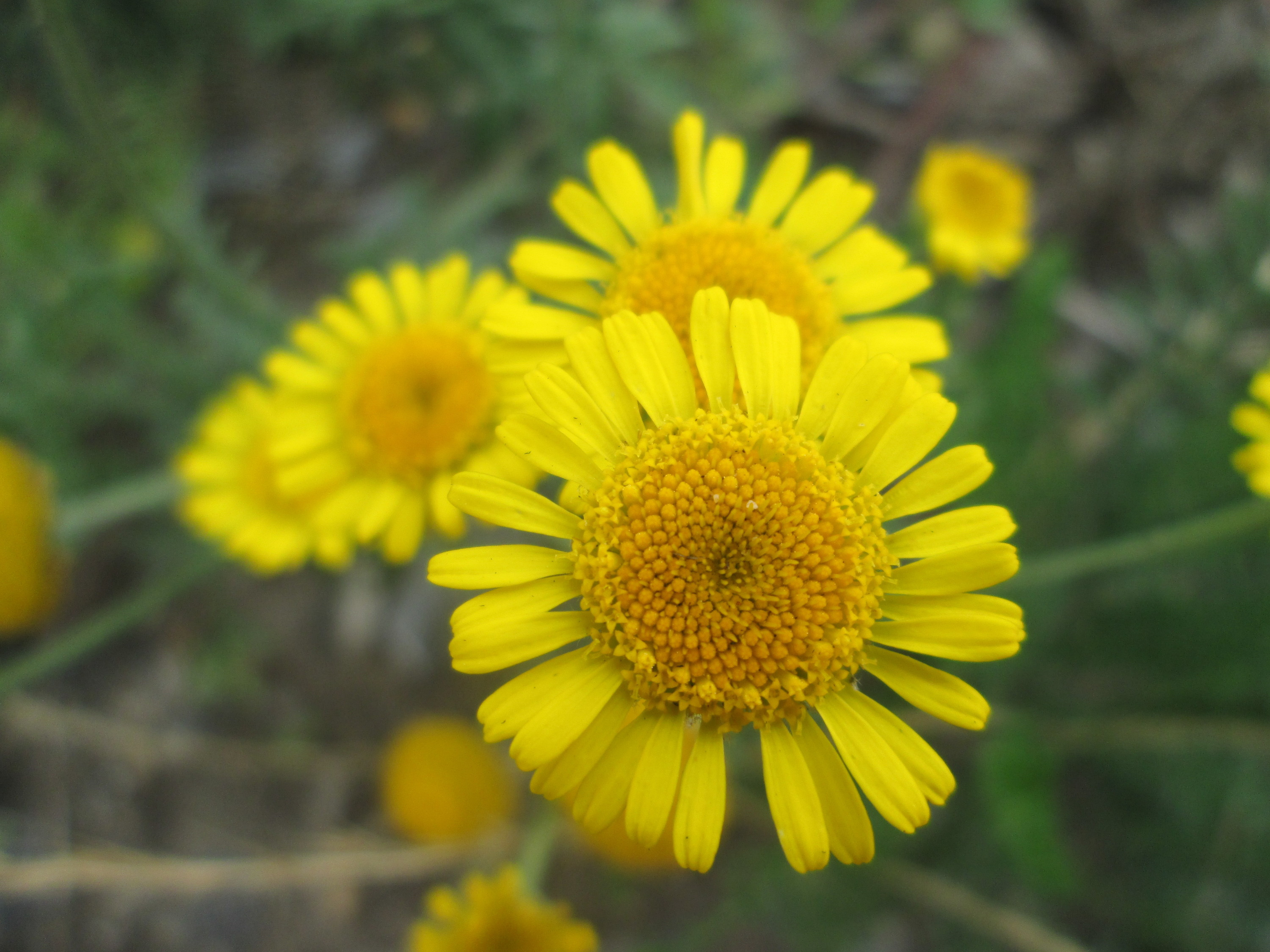

Scientific classification
- Kingdom: Plantae
- Clade: Embryophytes
- Clade: Tracheophytes
- Clade: Angiosperms
- Clade: Eudicots
- Clade: Asterids
- Order: Asterales
- Family: Asteraceae
- Genus: Glebionis
- Species: G. segetum

Binomial name
- Glebionis segetum (L.) Fourr.

Synonyms
- Chamaemelum segetum (L.) E.H.L.Krause; Chrysanthemum holophyllum Pau; Chrysanthemum laciniatum Gilib. nom. inval.; Chrysanthemum segetale Salisb.; Chrysanthemum segetum L.; Chrysanthemum umbrosum Willd.; Chrysanthemum welwitschii Sch.Bip. ex Nyman; Leucanthemum segetum (L.) Stankov; Matricaria segetum (L.) Schrank; Pinardia segetum (L.) H.Karst.; Pyrethrum segetum (L.) Moench; Pyrethrum umbrosum (Willd.) Boiss.; Xanthophthalmum segetum (L.) Sch.Bip.; Xantophtalmum segetum (L.) Sch. Bip.

= Glebionis segetum =

Species of flowering plant in the daisy family

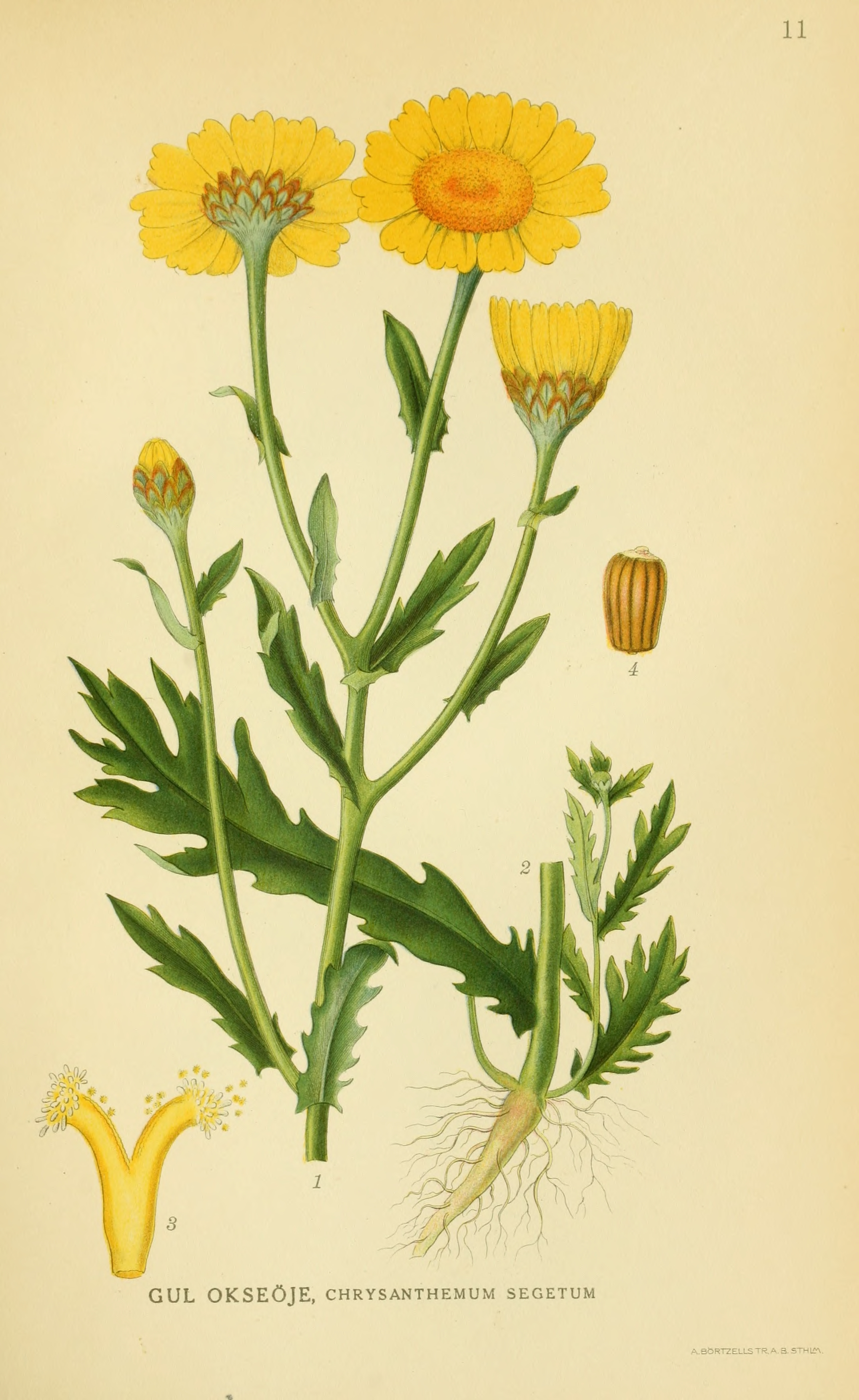

Glebionis segetum (syn. Chrysanthemum segetum) is a species of flowering plant in the family Asteraceae, probably native only to the eastern Mediterranean region but now naturalized in western and northern Europe as well as China and parts of North America. Common names include corn marigold and corn daisy.

Glebionis segetum has been hybridized with related Argyranthemum species to create cultivars of garden marguerites.

Glebionis segetum is a herbaceous annual plant growing to 80 cm (31 in) tall, with spirally arranged, deeply lobed leaves 5–20 cm (2.0–7.9 in) long. The flowers are bright yellow, produced in capitula (flowerheads) 3.5–5.5 cm (1.4–2.2 in) in diameter, with a ring of ray florets and a centre of disc florets.

Glebionis segetum is widely naturalised outside of its native range, colonising western and central Europe with early human agriculture; it can be an invasive weed in some areas. However, it also was ranked very highly, in terms of nectar production, thus showing particular value in the role of nectar-provider for insects in a UK survey of meadow species' production of nectar sugar and pollen. Glebionis segetum was practically an exact equivalent in terms of how much nectar and pollen it produced in this study with the popular garden and meadow plant, cornflower Centaurea cyanus—the top producer of nectar sugar among the cultivated plants in the study (as opposed to those classified as weeds). Its long blooming period helps its ranking, as it does not have few flowers with very high nectar volume per flower—coupled with a brief blooming period that completely exhausts the plant, like some top-ranked plants in nectar sugar production surveys (e.g. bull thistle, Cirsium vulgare). The plant strongly attracts very small butterflies (such as the Pearl Crescent) and also small hoverflies such as Toxomerus marginatus. Japanese beetles will consume the petals.

The corn marigold appears to have been a serious weed during the 13th century in Scotland, as suggested by a law of Alexander II which states that if a farmer allows so much as a single plant to produce seed in amongst his crops, then he will be fined a sheep.

In Crete and Greece, the leaves and the tender shoots of a variety called neromantilida (νερομαντηλίδα) are eaten raw in salads or browned in hot olive oil by the locals.

== Taxonomy ==
Glebionis segetum was formerly treated in the genus Chrysanthemum, but under a 1999 decision of the International Botanical Congress, that genus has been redefined with a different circumscription to include the economically important florist's chrysanthemum (now Chrysanthemum indicum).

The epithet segetum is a plural noun in the genitive case, meaning "of the corn[fields]", so does not change its ending to agree with the feminine genus name.
