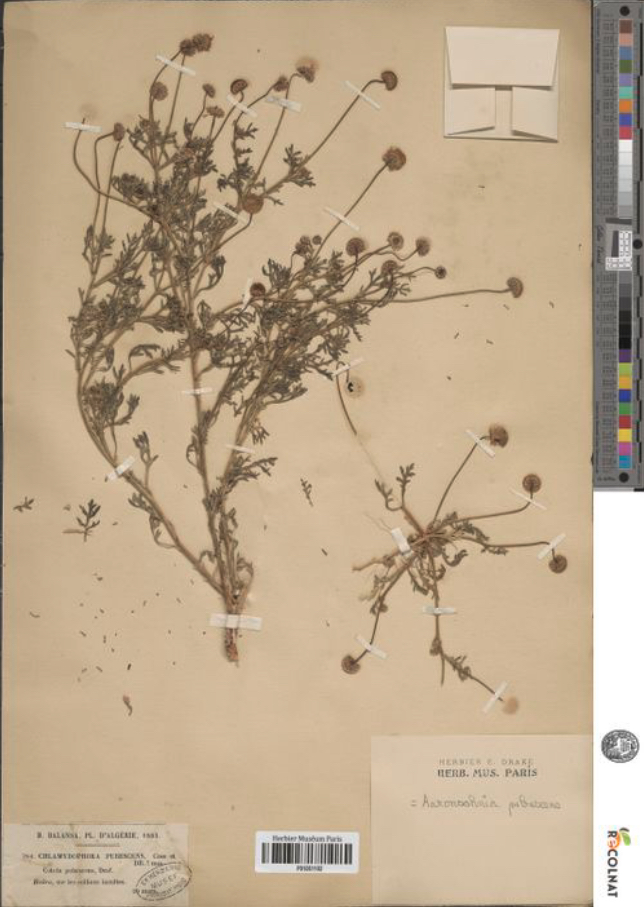

Scientific classification
- Kingdom: Plantae
- Clade: Tracheophytes
- Clade: Angiosperms
- Clade: Eudicots
- Clade: Asterids
- Order: Asterales
- Family: Asteraceae
- Genus: Otoglyphis
- Species: O. pubescens

Binomial name
- Otoglyphis pubescens (Desf.) Pomel

Subspecies
- Otoglyphis pubescens subsp. maroccana (Ball) Oberpr. & Vogt; Otoglyphis pubescens subsp. pubescens

Synonyms
- Aaronsohnia pubescens (Desf.) K.Bremer & Humphries; Chamomilla pubescens (Desf.) Alavi; Chlamydophora pubescens (Desf.) Coss. & Durieu; Chrysanthemum cossonianum Batt.; Cotula pubescens Desf. (1799) (basionym); Matricaria pubescens Sch.Bip.

= Otoglyphis pubescens =

Species of plant

Otoglyphis pubescens is species of flowering plant in the daisy family. It is found across North Africa and the Arabian Peninsula including Algeria, the eastern Canary Islands (Fuerteventura and Lanzarote) Libya, Morocco, Saudi Arabia, Tunisia, and Western Sahara.

Two subspecies are accepted.

- Otoglyphis pubescens subsp. maroccana (Ball) Oberpr. & Vogt – eastern Canary Islands (Fuerteventura and Lanzarote) and Morocco
- Otoglyphis pubescens subsp. pubescens – Northern Africa (Western Sahara, Morocco, Algeria, Tunisia, and Libya) and Saudi Arabia.
