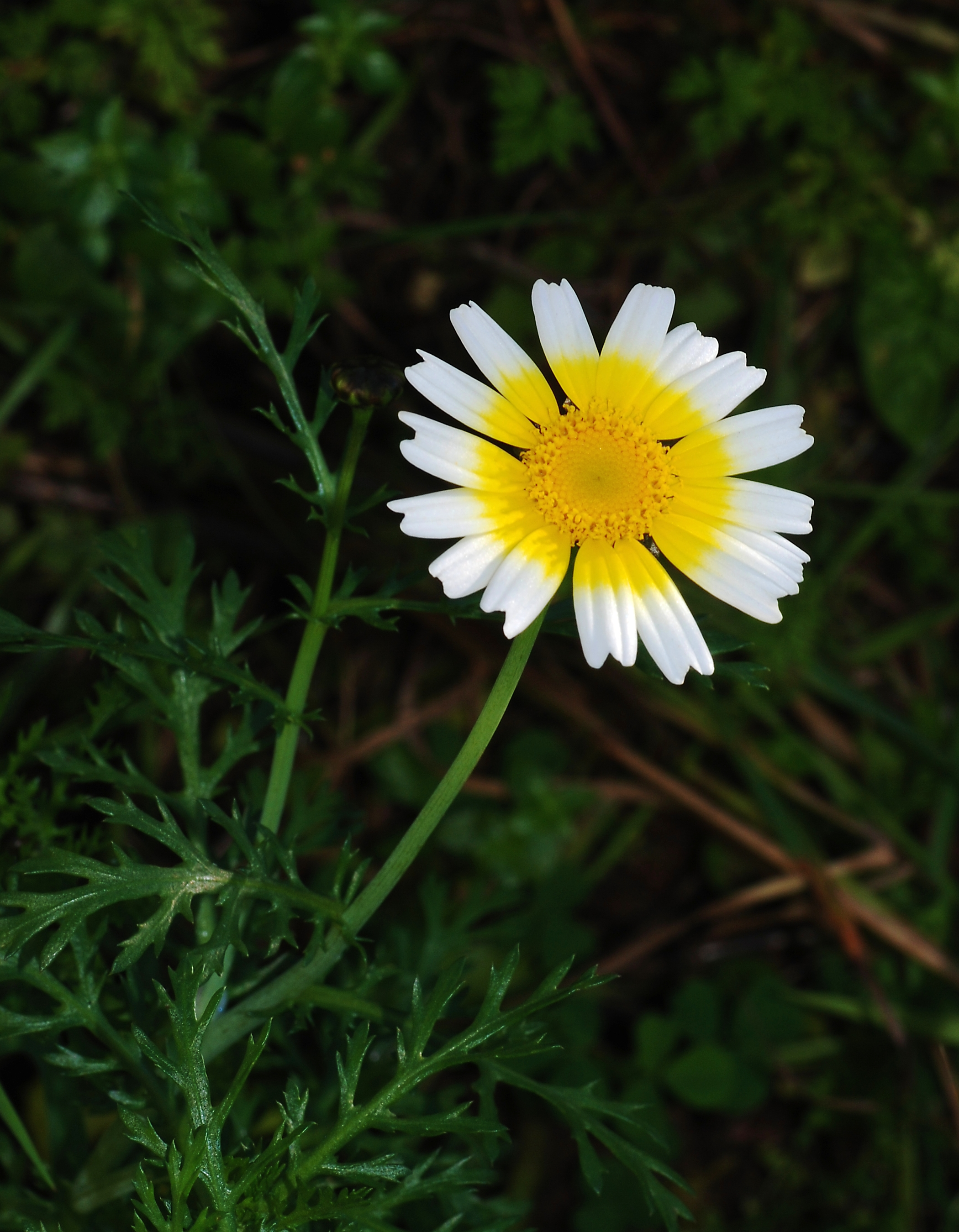
- Glebionis coronaria

Scientific classification
- Kingdom: Plantae
- Clade: Tracheophytes
- Clade: Angiosperms
- Clade: Eudicots
- Clade: Asterids
- Order: Asterales
- Family: Asteraceae
- Subfamily: Asteroideae
- Tribe: Anthemideae
- Genus: Glebionis; Cass.

Synonyms
- Xantophtalmum Schultz-Bipontinus

= Glebionis =

Genus of flowering plants from Europe and the Mediterranean region

Glebionis is a small genus of flowering plants in the family Asteraceae, native to Europe and the Mediterranean region. The species were formerly treated in the genus Chrysanthemum. A 1999 ruling of the International Botanical Congress redefined the type species for that genus as the economically important florist's chrysanthemum, thereby excluding the species now included in Glebionis.

Glebionis species have been hybridized with related Argyranthemum species to create cultivars of garden marguerites.

Species

- Glebionis coronaria (syn. Chrysanthemum coronarium) – crown daisy - central, + southern Europe
- Glebionis segetum (syn. Chrysanthemum segetum) – Corn Marigold - northern, central, + southern Europe

Formerly placed here

- Ismelia carinata, as Glebionis carinata – tricolor daisy
