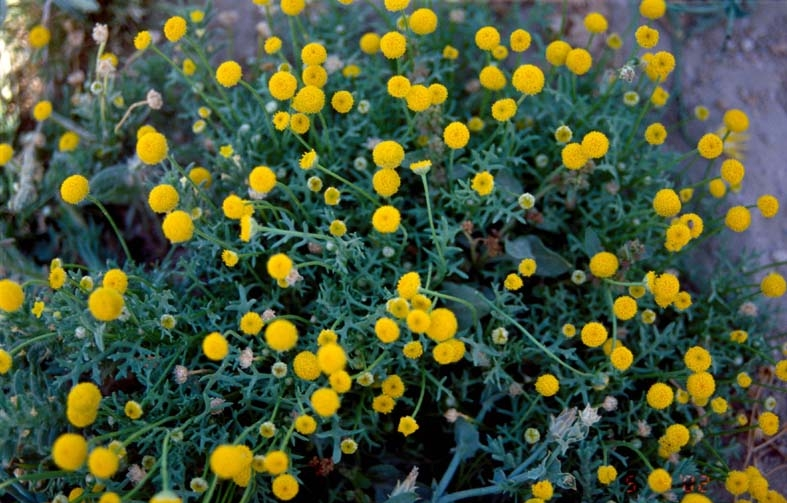

Scientific classification
- Kingdom: Plantae
- Clade: Tracheophytes
- Clade: Angiosperms
- Clade: Eudicots
- Clade: Asterids
- Order: Asterales
- Family: Asteraceae
- Genus: Otoglyphis
- Species: O. factorovskyi

Binomial name
- Otoglyphis factorovskyi (Warb. & Eig) Oberpr. & Vogt

Synonyms
- Aaronsohnia factorovskyi Warb. & Eig (1927) (basionym); Aaronsohnia factorovskyi var. brachyota Warb. & Eig

= Otoglyphis factorovskyi =

Species of plant

Otoglyphis factorovskyi (synonym Aaronsohnia factorovskyi) is a species of flowering plant in the daisy family Asteraceae. It is an herbaceous annual native to Western Asia. It grows in desert depressions and wadis, on sand, sandy gravel, loam, and clay soils and occasionally on rocky slopes and silty plains from 10 to 410 metres (33 to 1,345 ft) in elevation. The bulb part tastes like chestnuts when cooked.

== Description ==
An annual plant, from late October to early April, the plant grows its foliage, and from early to mid-January, the plant blooms. Its fruit, being two achenes, starts growing in late February and is ripened in early April, which leads to seed dispersal later.

Yellow inflorescences contain many tubular flowers, which are supported by long peduncles. Its pollen grains were found to be roughly spherical.

== Taxonomy ==
The species was first described as Aaronsohnia factorovskyi, and was named after the botanists Aaron Aaronsohn and his colleague Eliezer Faktorovsky. However, the plant was actually discovered by Otto Warburg and Alexander Eig in 1927. In 2022, Christoph Oberprieler and Robert M. Vogt moved the species to genus Otoglyphis.

== Distribution and habitat ==
O. factorovskyi is found from central Israel to Iraq and the Arabian Peninsula, and in the Judean Desert, the Samaria region, and certain parts of Jordan.

It grows in desert depressions and wadis, on sand, sandy gravel, loam, and clay soils and occasionally on rocky slopes and silty plains from 10 to 410 metres (33 to 1,345 ft) in elevation. The more water the plant receives, the more inflorescence is found on it and it thrives during heavy rain in wadis.

== Uses ==
The bulb tastes like chestnuts when cooked.

O. factorovskyi is known to have medicinal properties, and was often used by the residents of the Showbak region in Jordan. The extract from the plant, combined with silver nanoparticles, was found to be antibacterial.
