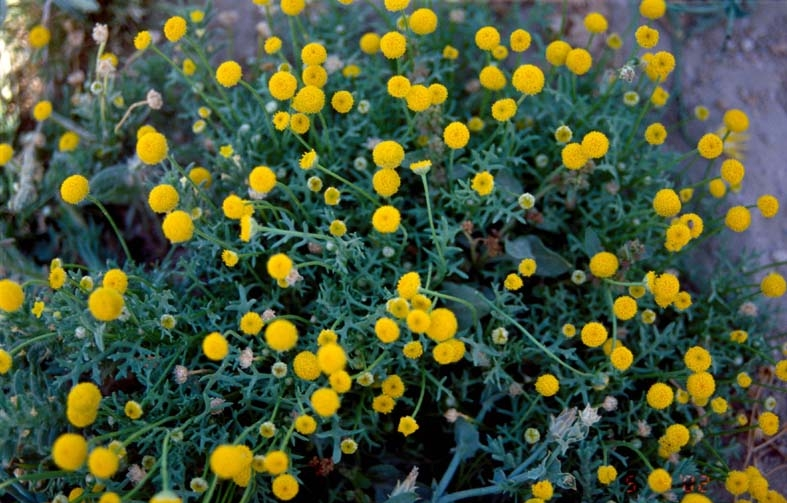
- Otoglyphis factorovskyi

Scientific classification
- Kingdom: Plantae
- Clade: Tracheophytes
- Clade: Angiosperms
- Clade: Eudicots
- Clade: Asterids
- Order: Asterales
- Family: Asteraceae
- Tribe: Anthemideae
- Subtribe: Glebionidinae
- Genus: Otoglyphis; Pomel

Species
- Otoglyphis factorovskyi (Warb. & Eig) Oberpr. & Vogt; Otoglyphis pubescens (Desf.) Pomel

Synonyms
- Aaronsohnia Warb. & Eig

= Otoglyphis =

Genus of flowering plants

Otoglyphis is a genus of flowering plants in the family Asteraceae. It includes two species of annual herbs native to mainly non-salty steppes and deserts in North Africa and the Arabian Peninsula.

The genus synonym Aaronsohnia was named in 1927 after the agronomist Aaron Aaronsohn by the botanists Otto Warburg (1859–1938) and Alexander Eig (1894–1938).

== Species and subspecies ==
As of June 2025, Plants of the World Online accepts two species.

- Otoglyphis factorovskyi (Warb. & Eig) Oberpr. & Vogt
- Otoglyphis pubescens (Desf.) Pomel (basionym: Cotula pubescens Desf.)
  - O. pubescens subsp. pubescens
  - O. pubescens subsp. maroccana (Ball) Oberpr. & Vogt

== Bibliography ==
- Bremer, K.; C. J. Humphries (1993). "Generic monograph of the Asteraceae-Anthemideae". Bull. Br. Mus. (Nat. Hist.) Bot. 23 (2): 71–177.
- Warburg, Otto; Eig, Alexander (1927). Leaflet, Agricultural Experiment Station, Zionist Organisation Institute. Vol. 6.
