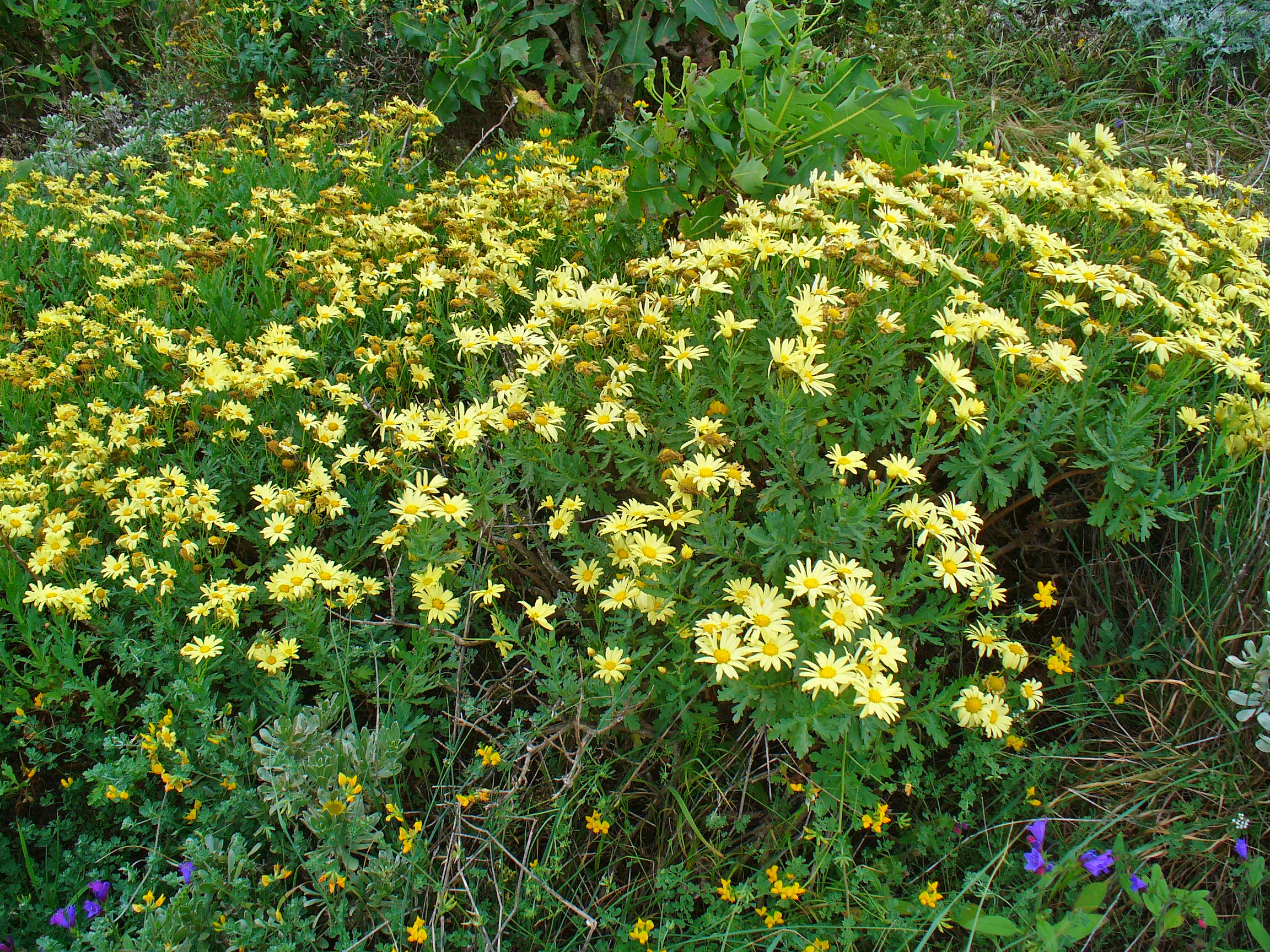
- A natural stand on Lanzarote

Scientific classification
- Kingdom: Plantae
- Clade: Embryophytes
- Clade: Tracheophytes
- Clade: Angiosperms
- Clade: Eudicots
- Clade: Asterids
- Order: Asterales
- Family: Asteraceae
- Genus: Argyranthemum
- Species: A. maderense

Binomial name
- Argyranthemum maderense (D.Don) Humphries

Synonyms
- Chrysanthemum ochroleucum (Webb ex Sch.Bip.) Masf.; Chrysanthemum ochroleucum (Webb ex Sch.Bip.) Bolle; Ismelia maderensis D.Don

= Argyranthemum maderense =

Species of flowering plant

Argyranthemum maderense, called the Madeira marguerite, is a species of flowering plant in the genus Argyranthemum. In spite of its scientific and common names it is not native to Madeira, but to Lanzarote in the Canary Islands some 500 km away. It has gained the Royal Horticultural Society's Award of Garden Merit.
