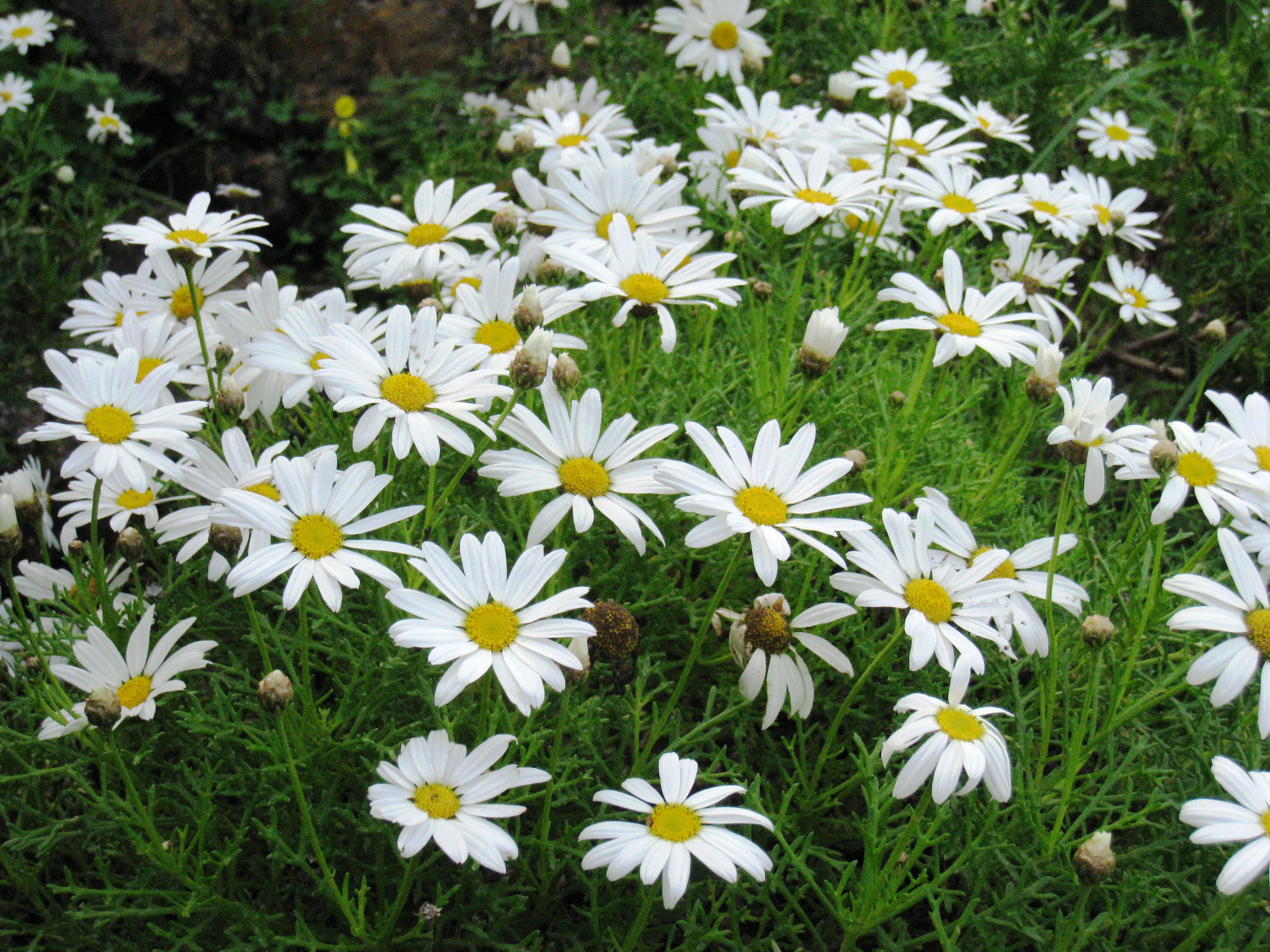

Scientific classification
- Kingdom: Plantae
- Clade: Tracheophytes
- Clade: Angiosperms
- Clade: Eudicots
- Clade: Asterids
- Order: Asterales
- Family: Asteraceae
- Genus: Argyranthemum
- Species: A. frutescens

Binomial name
- Argyranthemum frutescens (L.) Sch.Bip.

Synonyms
- Synonymy: Anthemis frutescens Voss; Chrysanthemum floridum Salisb.; Chrysanthemum foliosum Brouss. ex DC.; Chrysanthemum frutescens L.; Chrysanthemum fruticosum Buch; Matricaria frutescens Desr; Pyrethrum frutescens (L.) Gaertn.; Pyrethrum frutescens (L.) Willd.

= Argyranthemum frutescens =

Species of flowering plant

Argyranthemum frutescens, known as Paris daisy, marguerite or marguerite daisy, is a perennial plant known for its flowers. It is native to the Canary Islands (part of Spain). Hybrids derived from this species (garden marguerites) are widely cultivated as ornamental plants in private gardens and public parks in many countries, and have naturalized in Italy and southern California. There are many cultivars, but the most common has white petals.

== Description ==
It is a perennial shrub that grows to about 20–80 cm (7.9–31.5 in). The strongly branched plant often grows globose-bushy with ascending to upright branches. The alternate, more or less fleshy and blue-green leaves are in outline oval to oval-lanceolate, 1–8 cm (0.4–3.1 in) long and 4–6 cm (1.6–2.4 in) wide. The foliage is green. The inflorescences are loose with 4 to 30 daisy-like flower heads, white with a yellow center, up to 2 cm (0.79 in) in diameter.

In most subspecies, the ligules of the ray florets are about 8 mm long, pure white, female and form fertile achenes, which are triangular to horn-like winged. The achenes of the yellow tubular central flowers are sterile and one-winged. The pappus is always irregularly crown-shaped. The flower is very fragrant. The flower opens its petals in the morning and closes them at night.

== Subspecies ==
List:

- Argyranthemum frutescens subsp. canariae (Christ) Humphries
- Argyranthemum frutescens subsp. foeniculaceum (Pit. & Proust) Humphries
- Argyranthemum frutescens subsp. frutescens
- Argyranthemum frutescens subsp. gracilescens (Christ) Humphries
- Argyranthemum frutescens subsp. pumilum Humphries

== Distribution and habitat ==
Like the other Argyranthemum species, the shrub marguerite originates from the Canary Islands. On El Hierro, La Gomera, Tenerife and Gran Canaria it is common in the coastal regions, on La Palma very rare. Overall, it is the most common species of the genus in the Canary Islands. The plant often grows in succulent shrubbery on well-drained, poor soils in full sun, preferably also near the coast at altitudes up to 700 meters.

Along with full sunlight, this plant needs organic matter in high quantities in order to grow, while it also requires very well drained soil. The plant can die if overwhelmed with water. It is tolerant of low temperatures, although it cannot survive freezing. It requires a lot of sunlight and must be protected from the wind.

== Cultivation ==
Argyranthemum frutescens subsp. canariae has been given the Award of Garden Merit (AGM) by the Royal Horticultural Society. Many of the plants grown under the name "Argyranthemum frutescens" are cultivars of garden marguerites, some being hybrids between this species and related genera. The cultivars produce prolific single or double-flowered daisy-like flowers in shades of white, pink, yellow and purple throughout summer. In the UK climate, they are generally half-hardy, and can be grown from seed or cuttings, or purchased as young plants to be planted out after all danger of frost has passed.

== See also ==
- Leucanthemum, similar looking plant of different genus
