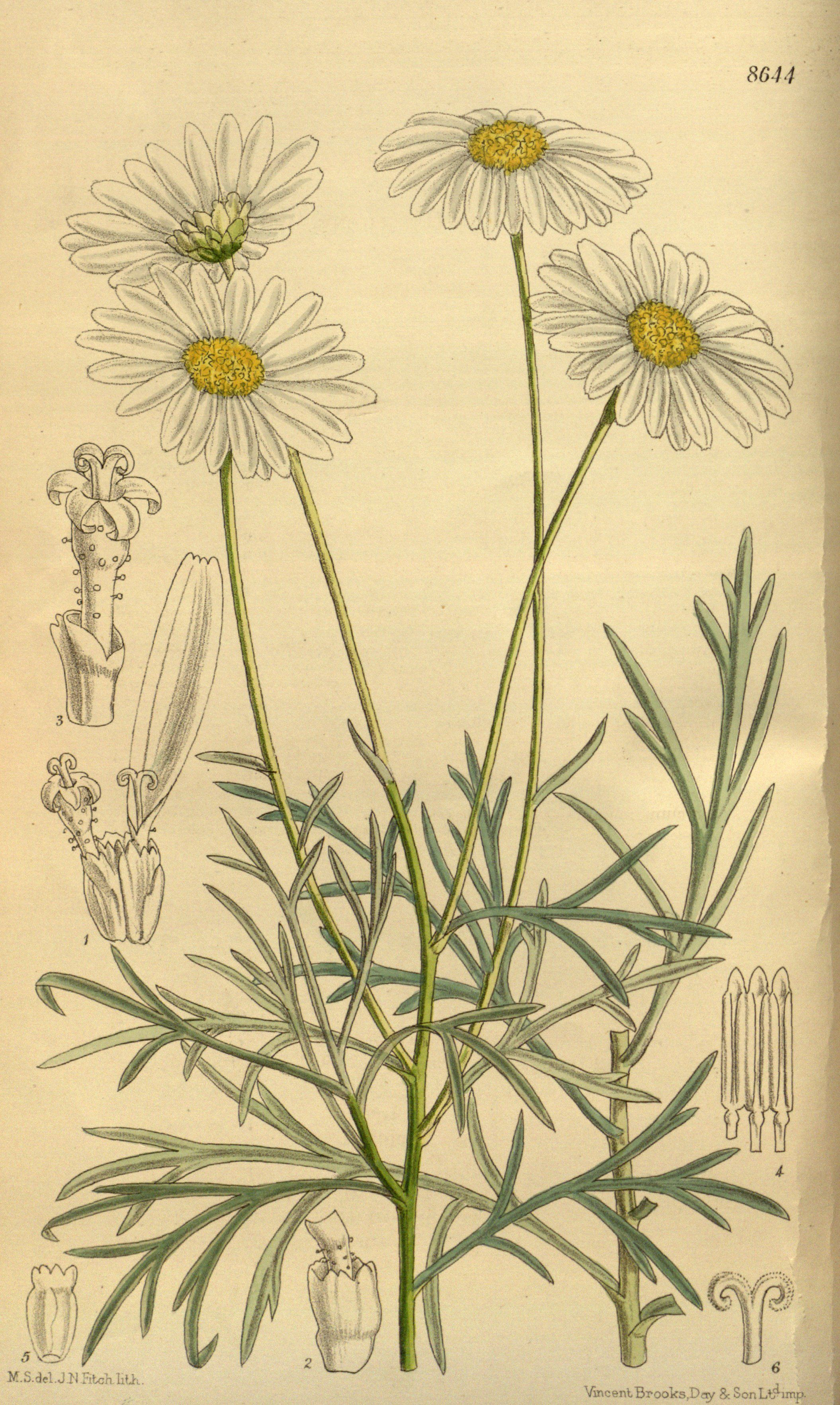
- 1916 illustration

Scientific classification
- Kingdom: Plantae
- Clade: Tracheophytes
- Clade: Angiosperms
- Clade: Eudicots
- Clade: Asterids
- Order: Asterales
- Family: Asteraceae
- Genus: Argyranthemum
- Species: A. foeniculaceum

Binomial name
- Argyranthemum foeniculaceum Webb ex Sch.Bip.

Synonyms
- Chrysanthemum anethifolium Brouss. ex Willd.; Chrysanthemum crithmifolium Brouss. ex Buch; Chrysanthemum foeniculaceum (Willd.) Brouss. ex Steud.; Pyrethrum foeniculaceum Willd.

= Argyranthemum foeniculaceum =

Species of flowering plant

Argyranthemum foeniculaceum, called the Canary Island marguerite, is native to the Canary Islands, (part of Spain). It is widely cultivated as an ornamental and naturalized in California and Australia.
