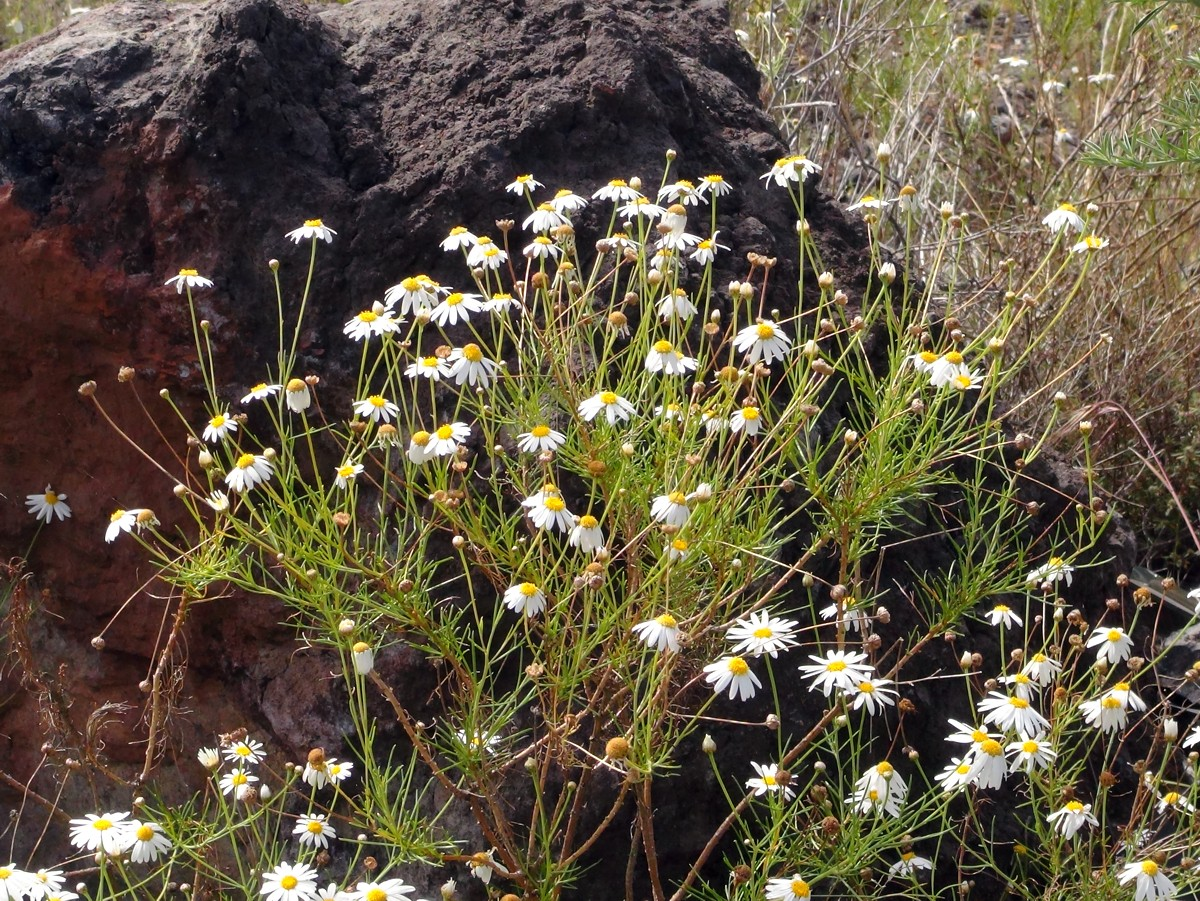
- In the wild on Tenerife

Scientific classification
- Kingdom: Plantae
- Clade: Embryophytes
- Clade: Tracheophytes
- Clade: Angiosperms
- Clade: Eudicots
- Clade: Asterids
- Order: Asterales
- Family: Asteraceae
- Genus: Argyranthemum
- Species: A. gracile

Binomial name
- Argyranthemum gracile Sch.Bip.

Synonyms
- Chrysanthemum gracile (Sch.Bip.) Masf.

= Argyranthemum gracile =

Species of flowering plant

Argyranthemum gracile, called the Tenerife white marguerite, is a species of flowering plant in the genus Argyranthemum, native to Tenerife in the Canary Islands. Its cultivar 'Chelsea Girl' has gained the Royal Horticultural Society's Award of Garden Merit.
