= Heteranthemis =

Scientific classification
- Kingdom: Plantae
- Clade: Tracheophytes
- Clade: Angiosperms
- Clade: Eudicots
- Clade: Asterids
- Order: Asterales
- Family: Asteraceae
- Subfamily: Asteroideae
- Tribe: Anthemideae
- Genus: Heteranthemis; Schott
- Species: H. viscidehirta

Binomial name
- Heteranthemis viscidehirta Schott

Genus of flowering plants

Heteranthemis is a monotypic genus of plants in the daisy family containing the single species Heteranthemis viscidehirta (orth. var. H. viscidihirta), which is known by the common name oxeye, or sticky oxeye. This plant is native to the Iberian Peninsula and adjacent areas in North Africa, but it can be found in other parts of the world as an introduced species. This is an annual herb growing erect stems 20 to 80 centimeters tall. Its abundant leaves are a few centimeters long, wavy to curly and divided into irregular toothed lobes. The stem and foliage are glandular and produce a sticky exudate. The plants produce bright yellow daisylike flower heads, with bases covered in large green phyllaries. The center of the head is filled with many yellow disc florets and the edge is fringed with toothed yellow ray florets about 2 centimeters long.
