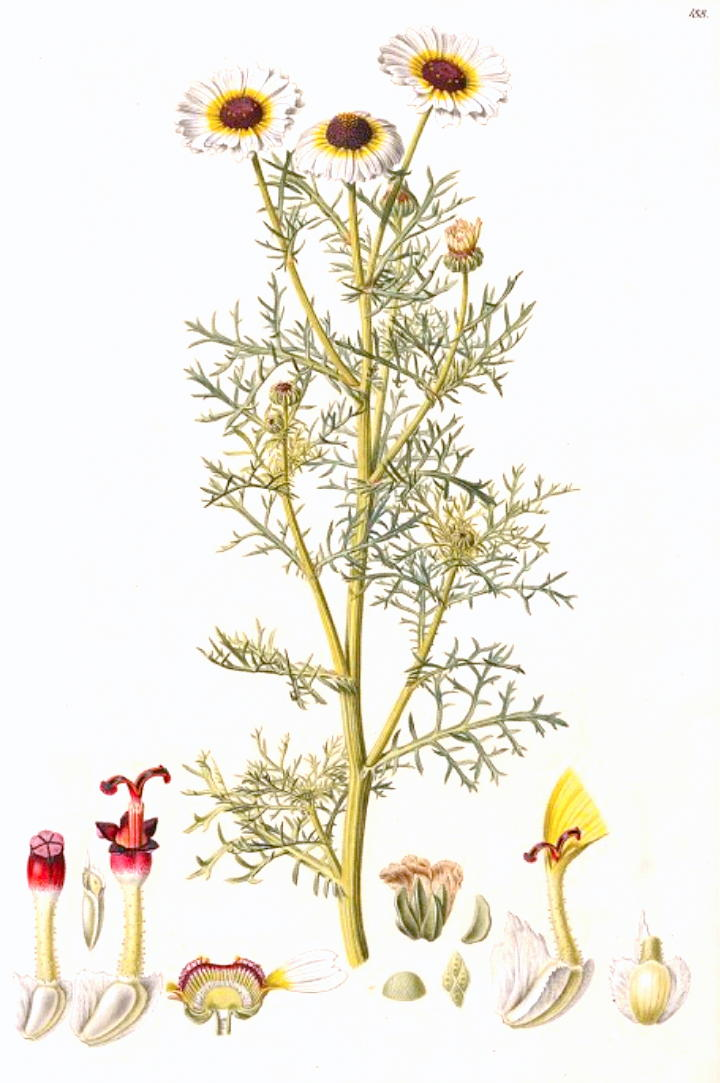
- 1800 illustration

Scientific classification
- Kingdom: Plantae
- Clade: Tracheophytes
- Clade: Angiosperms
- Clade: Eudicots
- Clade: Asterids
- Order: Asterales
- Family: Asteraceae
- Subfamily: Asteroideae
- Tribe: Anthemideae
- Genus: Ismelia; Cass.
- Species: I. carinata

Binomial name
- Ismelia carinata (Schousb.) Sch.Bip.

Synonyms
- Chrysanthemum assakae Caball.; Chrysanthemum carinatum Schousb. 1800; Glebionis carinata (Schousb.) Tzvelev; Ismelia versicolor Cass.

= Ismelia =

Genus of flowering plants

Ismelia carinata, the tricolour chrysanthemum, tricolor daisy, or annual chrysanthemum, is an ornamental plant native to north Africa that is cultivated as a garden plant and grows as a weed in California. It is the sole species in the genus Ismelia. It has been hybridized with related Argyranthemum species to create cultivars of garden marguerites.
