= Coleophora involucrella =

Scientific classification
- Kingdom: Animalia
- Phylum: Arthropoda
- Class: Insecta
- Order: Lepidoptera
- Family: Coleophoridae
- Genus: Coleophora
- Species: C. involucrella

Binomial name
- Coleophora involucrella Chrétien, 1905

Synonyms
- Coleophora praeposita Toll, 1952

Species of moth

Coleophora involucrella is a moth of the family Coleophoridae. It is found on the Canary Islands (Fuerteventura, La Gomera) and in Spain, Portugal, France, and Morocco.

The larvae feed on the seedheads of Santolina rosmarinifolia and Santolina chamaecyparissus.
