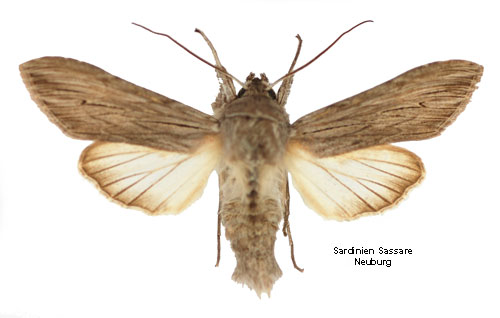

Scientific classification
- Domain: Eukaryota
- Kingdom: Animalia
- Phylum: Arthropoda
- Class: Insecta
- Order: Lepidoptera
- Superfamily: Noctuoidea
- Family: Noctuidae
- Genus: Cucullia
- Species: C. tanaceti

Binomial name
- Cucullia tanaceti (Denis & Schiffermüller, 1775)

Synonyms
- Noctua tanaceti Denis & Schiffermuller, 1775; Cucullia beata Rothschild, 1920

= Cucullia tanaceti =

Species of moth

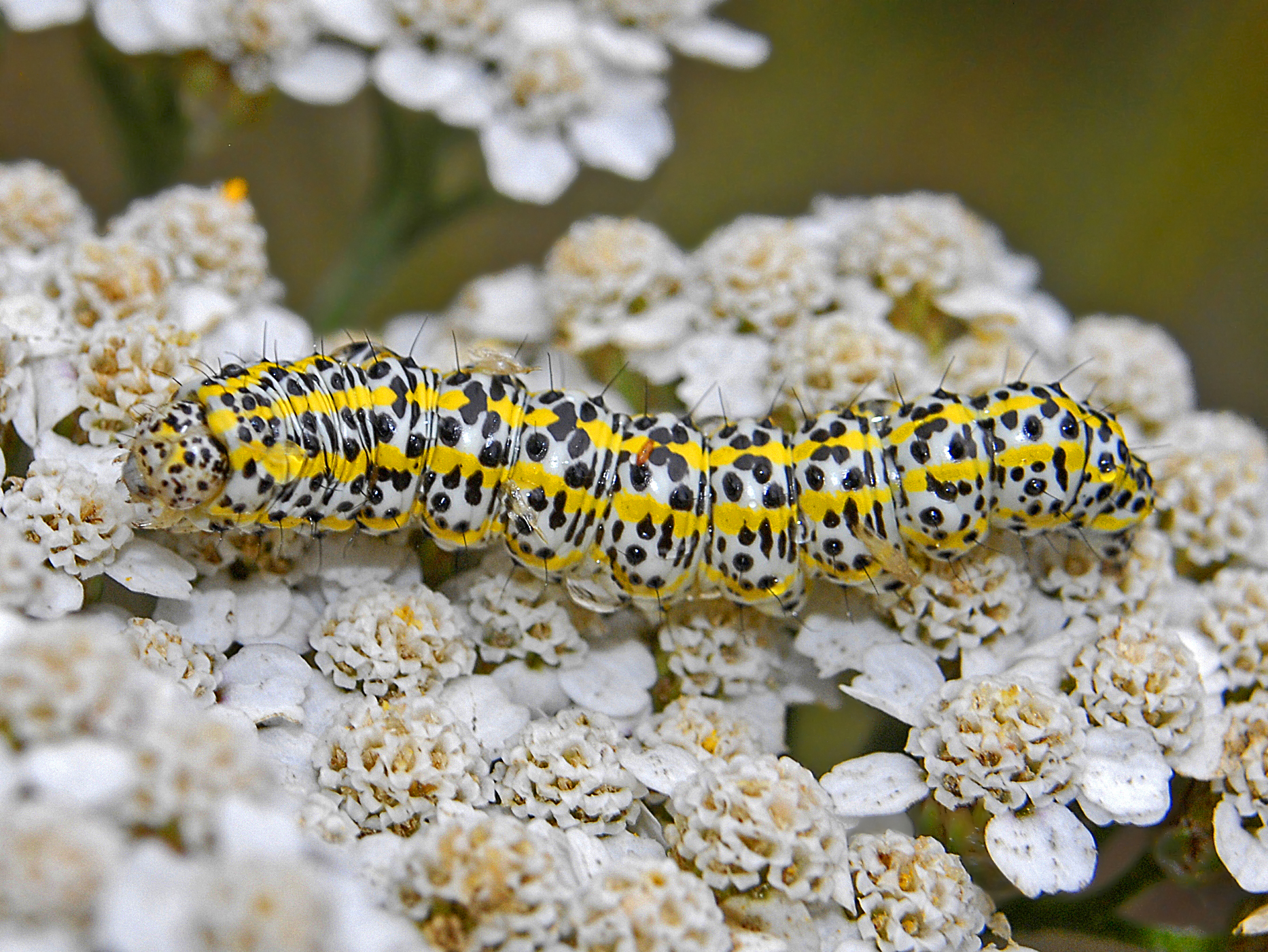
Caterpillar of Cucullia tanaceti

Cucullia tanaceti is a moth of the family Noctuidae. The species was first described by Michael Denis and Ignaz Schiffermüller in 1775.

== Description ==
Cucullia tanaceti has a wingspan of 40–48 millimetres (1.6–1.9 in). Adults have greyish-brownish wings, while caterpillars are white with yellow longitudinal lines and black markings. Adults are on the wing from April to early June and from July to September.

It is a bivoltine species. In summer the larvae feed on Achillea, Tanacetum, Anthemis, Santolina, Ormenis, while in autumn they feed on Artemisia. Pupation last two years.

== Distribution ==
This species is widespread in Europe, Near East, Asia Minor, Iran and Turkestan.

== Habitat ==
They prefer xerophilous areas, dry sunny slopes and rocky places.
