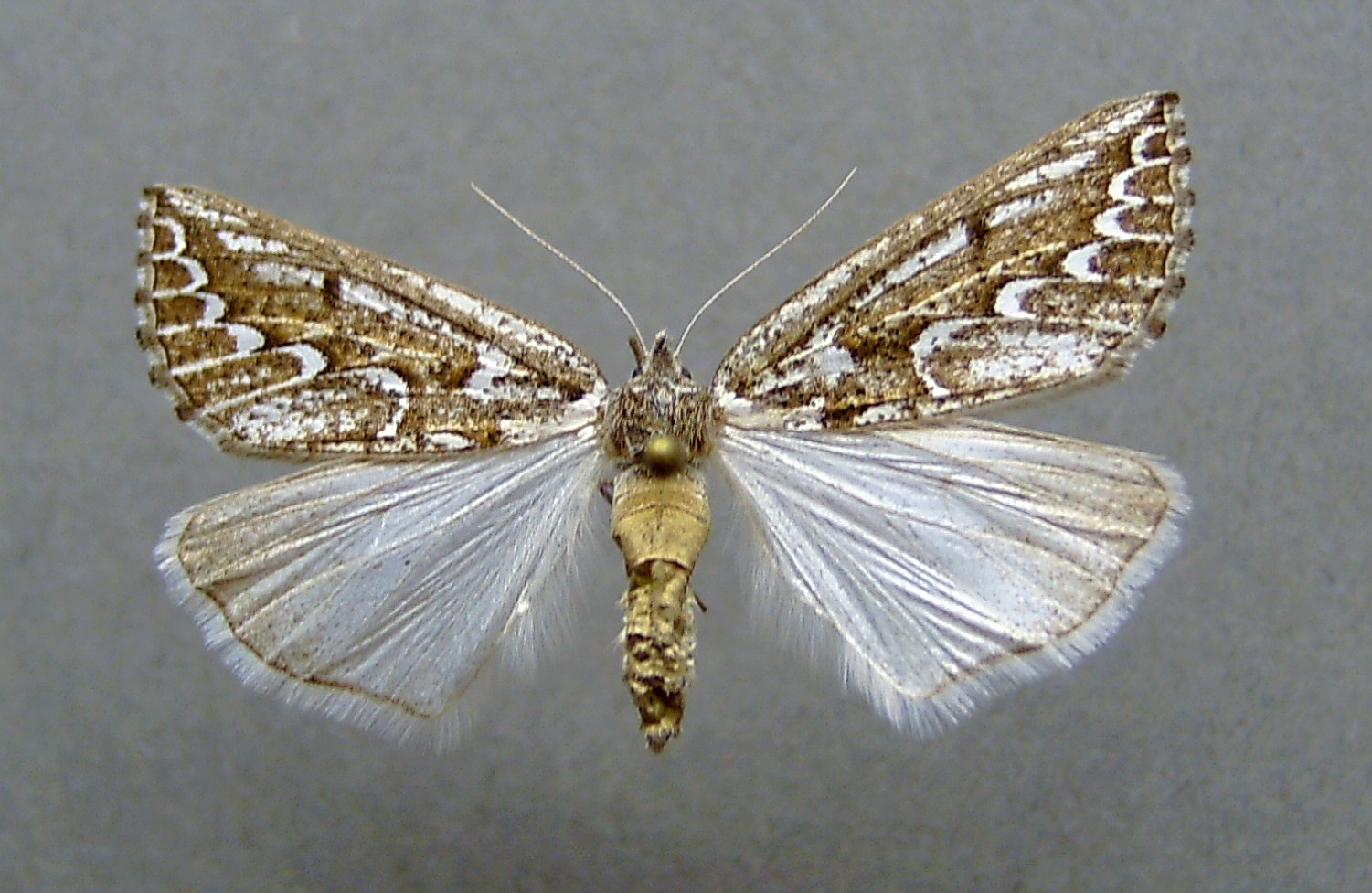
- Female
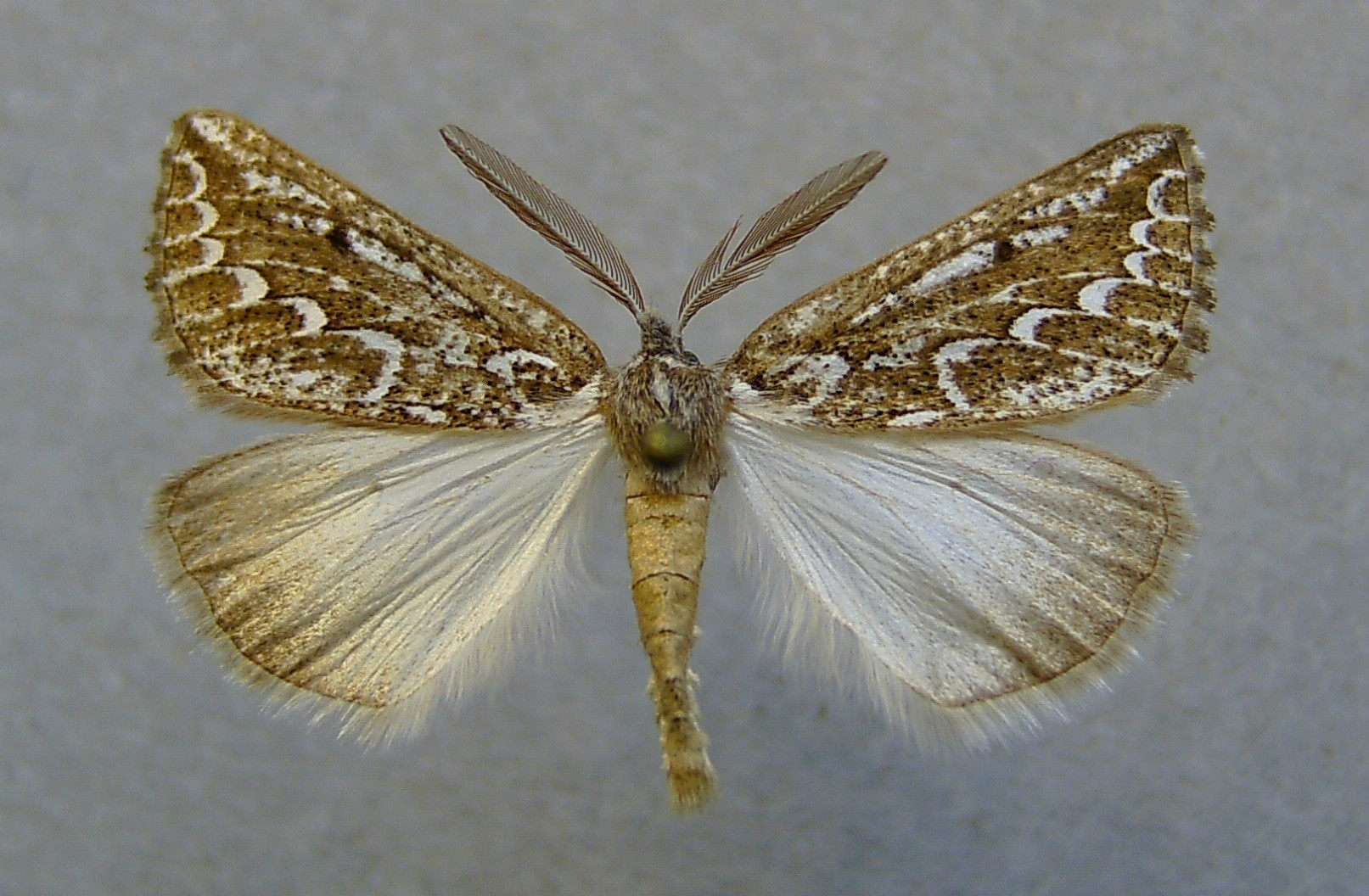
- Male

Scientific classification
- Domain: Eukaryota
- Kingdom: Animalia
- Phylum: Arthropoda
- Class: Insecta
- Order: Lepidoptera
- Family: Geometridae
- Genus: Compsoptera
- Species: C. jourdanaria

Binomial name
- Compsoptera jourdanaria (Serres, 1826)

Synonyms
- Geometra jourdanaria Serres, 1826; Prosopolopha anargyra Turati, 1913; Ligia acutaria Herrich-Schaffer, 1852

= Compsoptera jourdanaria =

Species of moth

Compsoptera jourdanaria is a moth of the family Geometridae. It was described by Serres in 1826. It is found in France, Spain, Portugal and on Sardinia and Corsica.

The wingspan is 30–36 mm for males and 29–39 mm for females. Adults are on wing from September to October.

The larvae feed on Santolina, Thymus, Helichrysum and Dorycnium species.

== Subspecies ==
According to BioLib :

- Compsoptera jourdanaria anargyra (Turati, 1913)
- Compsoptera jourdanaria jourdanaria (Serres, 1826)
