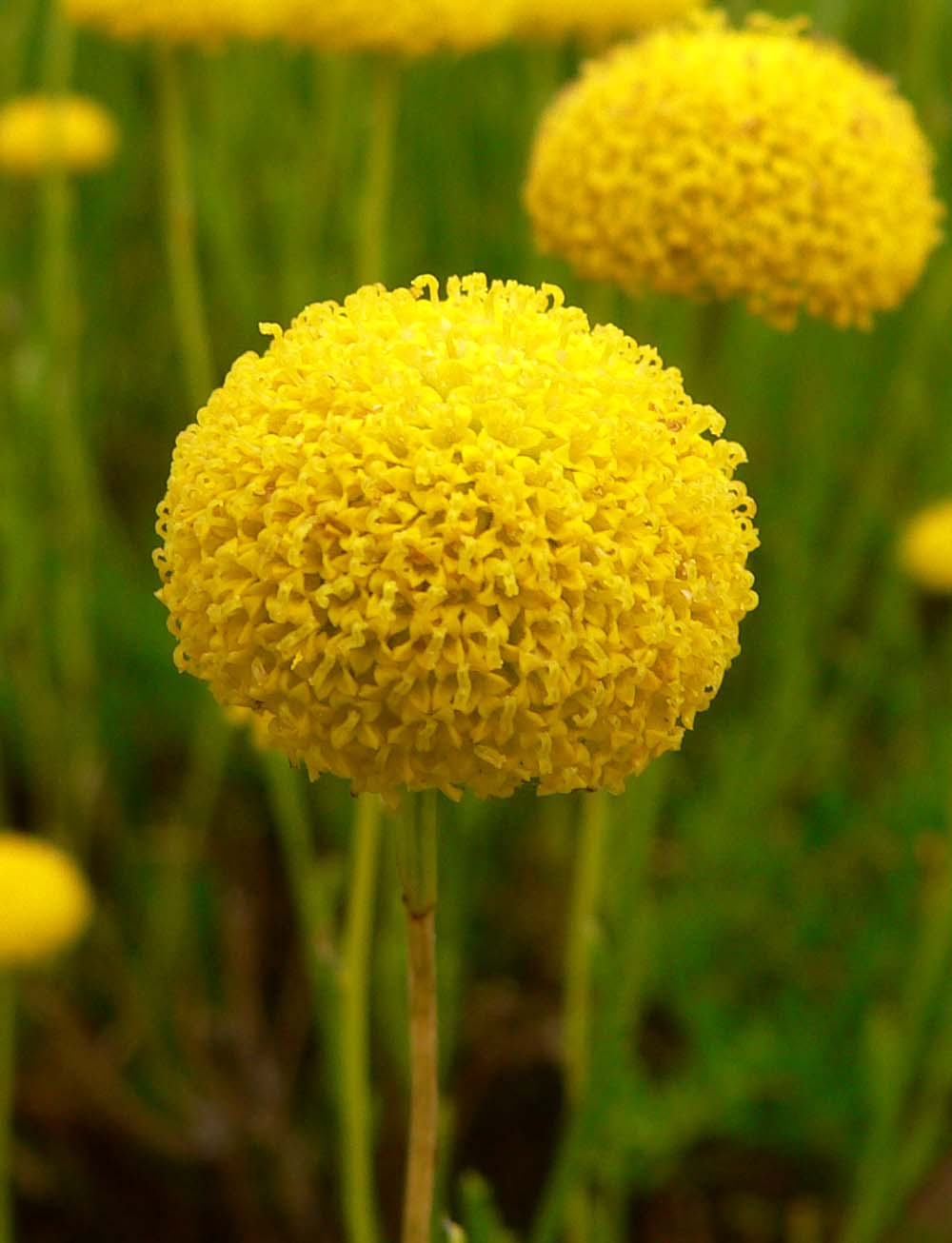
- Flowers
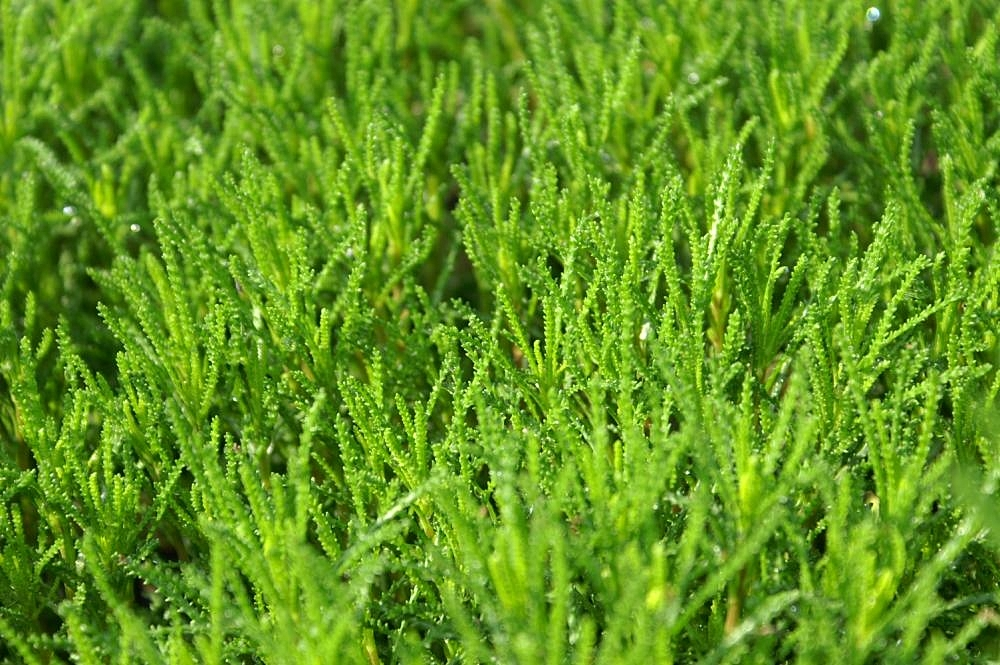
- Foliage

Scientific classification
- Kingdom: Plantae
- Clade: Tracheophytes
- Clade: Angiosperms
- Clade: Eudicots
- Clade: Asterids
- Order: Asterales
- Family: Asteraceae
- Genus: Santolina
- Species: S. virens

Binomial name
- Santolina virens Mill.

Synonyms
- Santolina chamaecyparissus subsp. viridis Rouy; Santolina eliasii Sennen; Santolina paui Sennen & Elias; Santolina pervirens Sennen & Pau; Santolina teretifolia Sennen & Elias; Santolina teretifolia var. flexuosa Sennen & Elias; Santolina viridis Willd.

= Santolina virens =

Species of plant

Santolina virens, the green lavender cotton, is a species of flowering plant in the family Asteraceae, native to Spain, France, Great Britain, Germany, Italy, Ukraine (including Crimea), and the North Caucasus. This taxon has been marked by nomenclatural difficulties since Linnaeus and is currently considered part of the Santolina chamaecyparissus species complex.

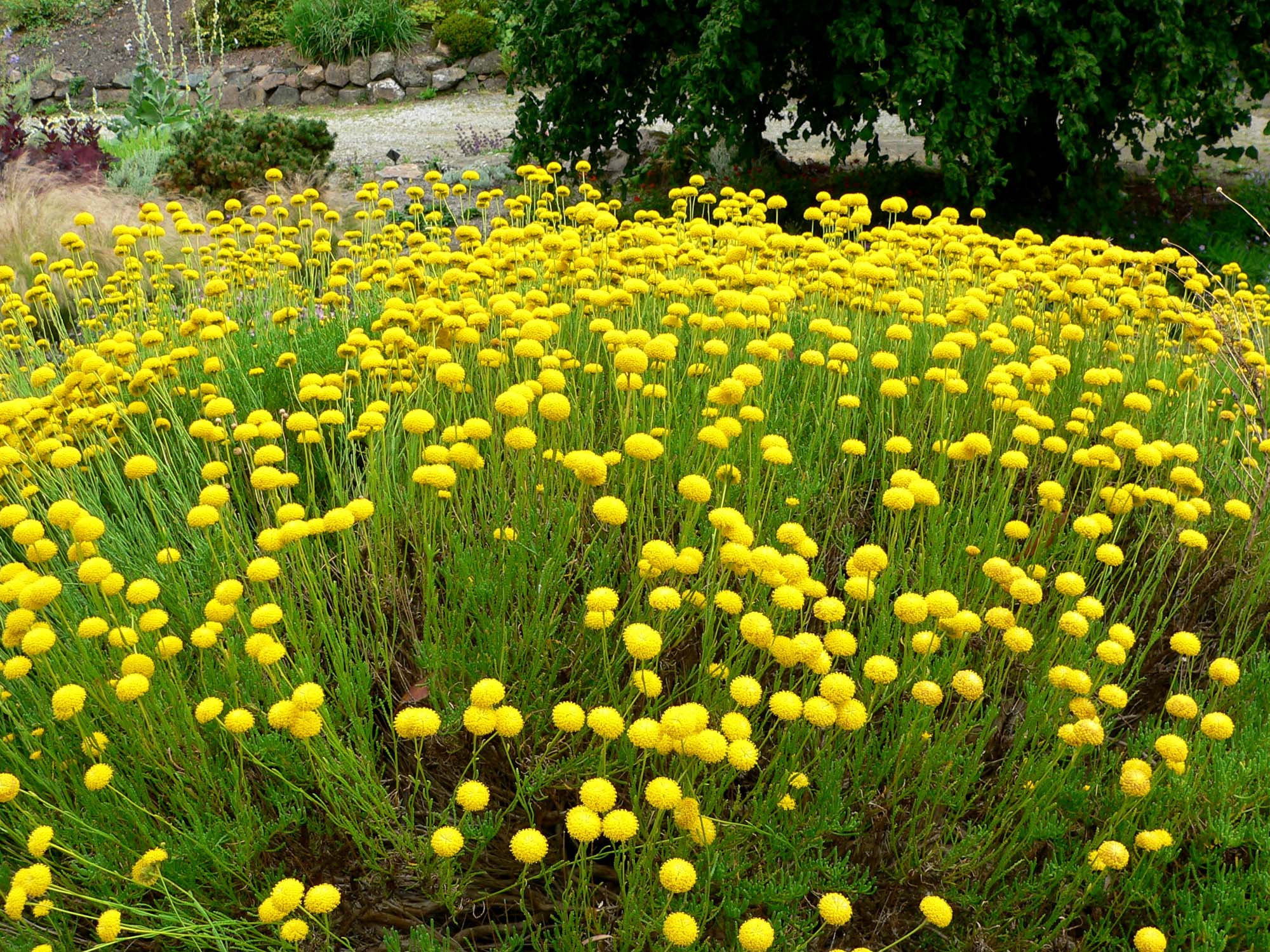
Mass effect
