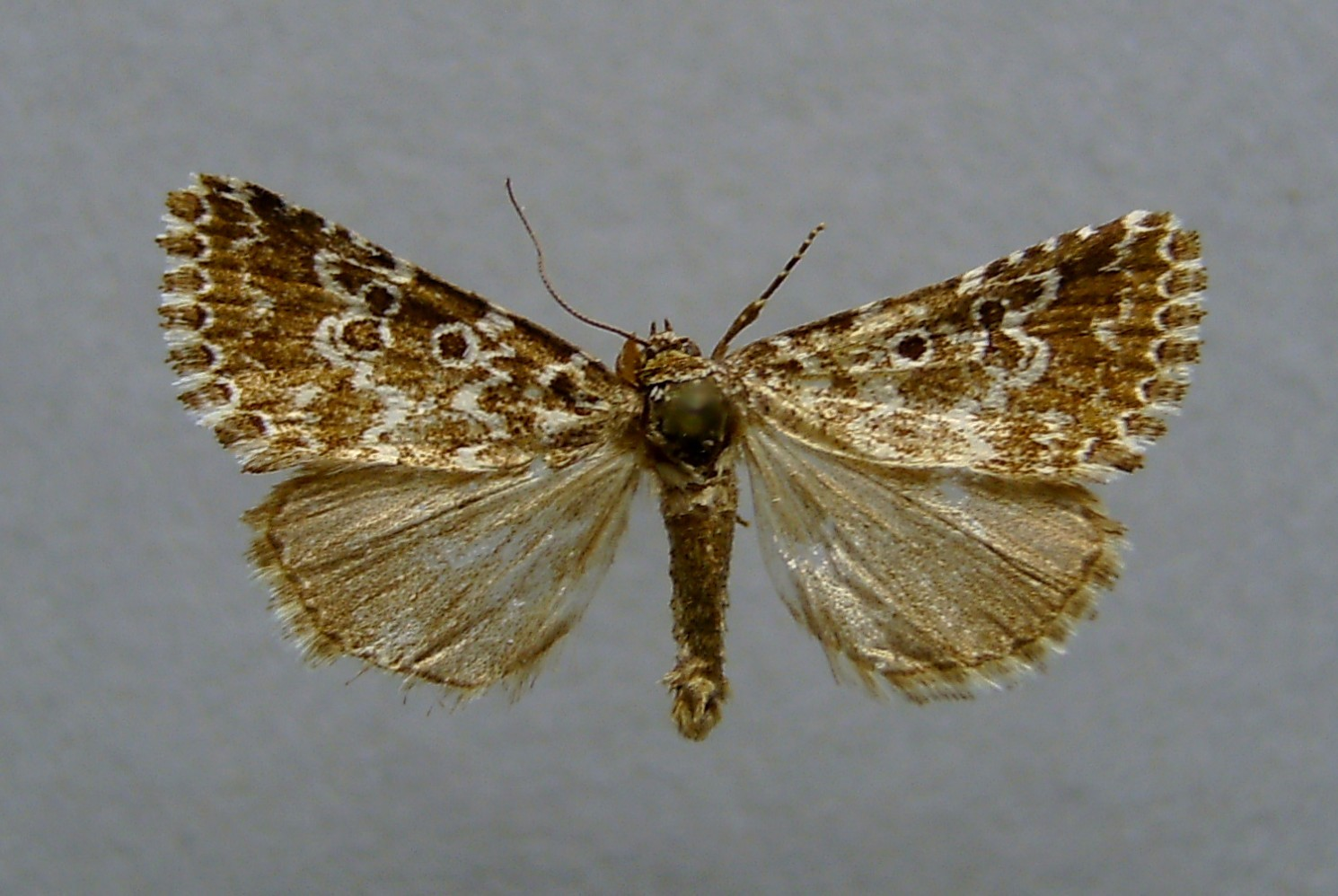

Scientific classification
- Kingdom: Animalia
- Phylum: Arthropoda
- Class: Insecta
- Order: Lepidoptera
- Superfamily: Noctuoidea
- Family: Noctuidae
- Genus: Alvaradoia
- Species: A. disjecta

Binomial name
- Alvaradoia disjecta (Rothschild, 1920)

Synonyms
- Phyllophila disjecta Rothschild, 1920

= Alvaradoia disjecta =

Species of moth

Alvaradoia disjecta is a moth of the family Noctuidae first described by Walter Rothschild in 1920. It is found in eastern Spain and south-eastern France.

The wingspan is 20–28 mm. Adults are mainly on the wing from June to July, but have also been recorded at the beginning of September, suggesting a second generation.

The larvae feed on the leaves of Santolina chamaecyparissus.
