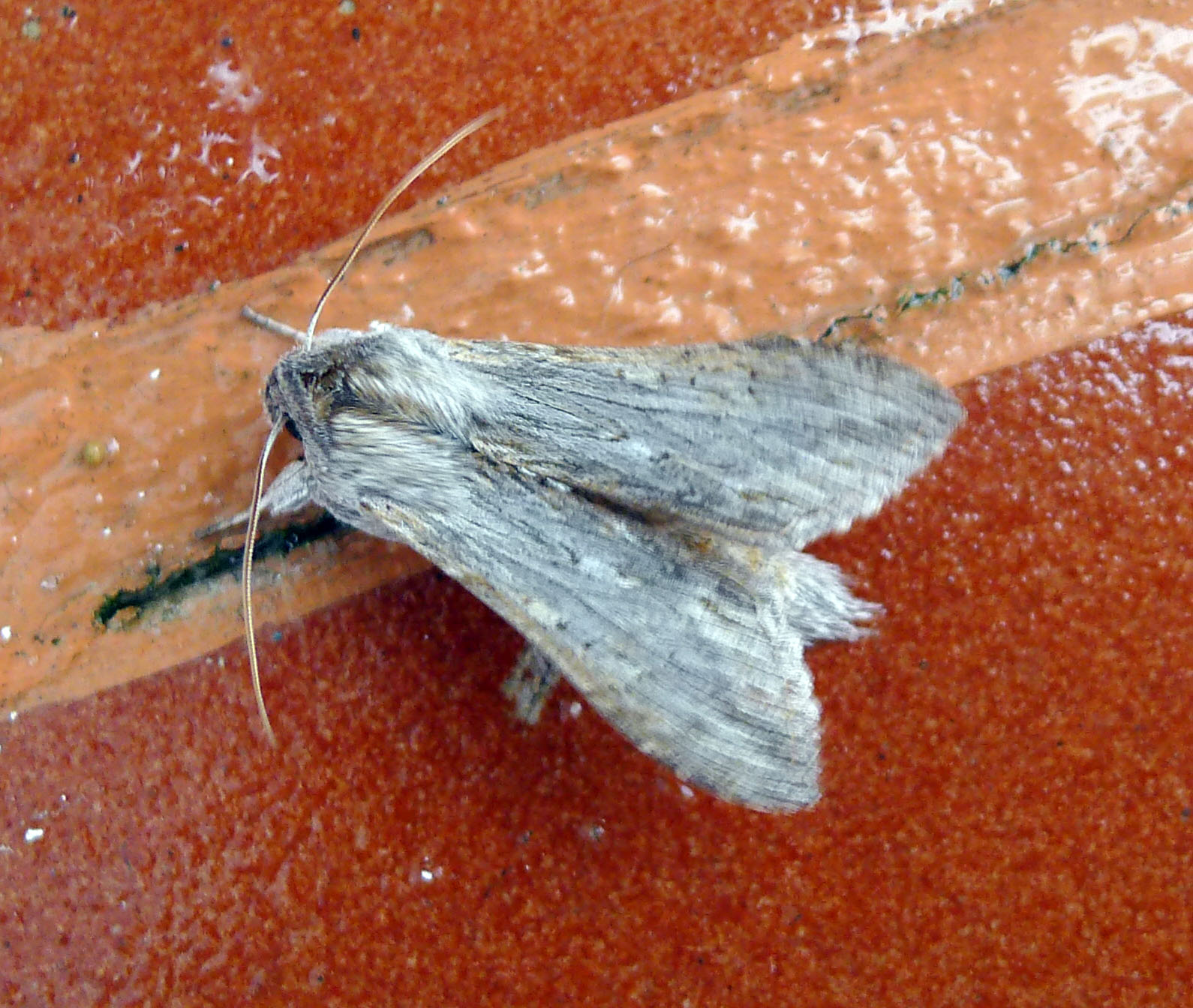

Scientific classification
- Domain: Eukaryota
- Kingdom: Animalia
- Phylum: Arthropoda
- Class: Insecta
- Order: Lepidoptera
- Superfamily: Noctuoidea
- Family: Noctuidae
- Genus: Cucullia
- Species: C. calendulae

Binomial name
- Cucullia calendulae Treitschke, 1835

Synonyms
- Cucullia wredowi Costa, 1836; Cucullia dellabrunai Berio, 1980

= Cucullia calendulae =

Species of moth

Cucullia calendulae is a moth of the family Noctuidae. It is widespread in all parts of the Mediterranean Basin, from northern Africa to Saudi Arabia, Lebanon, Jordan, Israel, Transcaucasus, Turkmenistan, Iran and Afghanistan. It closely resembles Cucullia chamomillae.Genitalia preparations are essential for determination. Adults are on wing from November to April. There is one generation per year.

The larvae feed on Asteraceae species, including Calendula, Achillea, Anthemis and Ormenis. In Egypt it has been recorded on Chrysanthemum coronarium.
