= Bucculatrix santolinella =

Scientific classification
- Kingdom: Animalia
- Phylum: Arthropoda
- Clade: Pancrustacea
- Class: Insecta
- Order: Lepidoptera
- Family: Bucculatricidae
- Genus: Bucculatrix
- Species: B. santolinella

Binomial name
- Bucculatrix santolinella Walsingham, 1898

Species of moth

Bucculatrix santolinella is a moth in the family Bucculatricidae. It was described by Thomas de Grey, 6th Baron Walsingham in 1898. It is found in southern France and Spain and on Corsica and Sardinia.

The wingspan is about 8 mm.

The larvae feed on Santolina species.>
