= Isocarpha megacephala =

Scientific classification
- Kingdom: Plantae
- Clade: Tracheophytes
- Clade: Angiosperms
- Clade: Eudicots
- Clade: Asterids
- Order: Asterales
- Family: Asteraceae
- Genus: Isocarpha
- Species: I. megacephala

Binomial name
- Isocarpha megacephala Mattf. 1925

Species of flowering plant

Isocarpha megacephala is a New World species of plants in the family Asteraceae. It has been found only in northeastern Brazil (Bahia, Pernambuco, Paraíba).

Isocarpha megacephala is an annual or perennial herb up to 50 cm (19.5 in) tall. Leaves are up to 7 cm (3 in) long. One plant produces several flower heads, each 8–10 mm (0.31–0.39 in) across (thus larger than the other species) each head on a long flower stalk, each head with 200-300 white disc flowers but no ray flowers.
