= Isocarpha microcephala =

Scientific classification
- Kingdom: Plantae
- Clade: Tracheophytes
- Clade: Angiosperms
- Clade: Eudicots
- Clade: Asterids
- Order: Asterales
- Family: Asteraceae
- Genus: Isocarpha
- Species: I. microcephala

Binomial name
- Isocarpha microcephala (DC.) S.F.Blake (1926)

Synonyms
- Dunantia microcephala DC. (1836); Isocarpha blepharolepis Greenm.; Isocarpha divaricata Benth.

Species of plant

Isocarpha microcephala is a New World species of plants in the family Asteraceae. It has been found only in Peru and Ecuador.

Isocarpha microcephala is an annual or perennial herb up to 100 cm (40 inches) tall. Leaves are up to 7 cm (2.8 inches) long. One plant produces several flower heads, each head with 80-140 white, pink, or purple disc flowers but no ray flowers.
