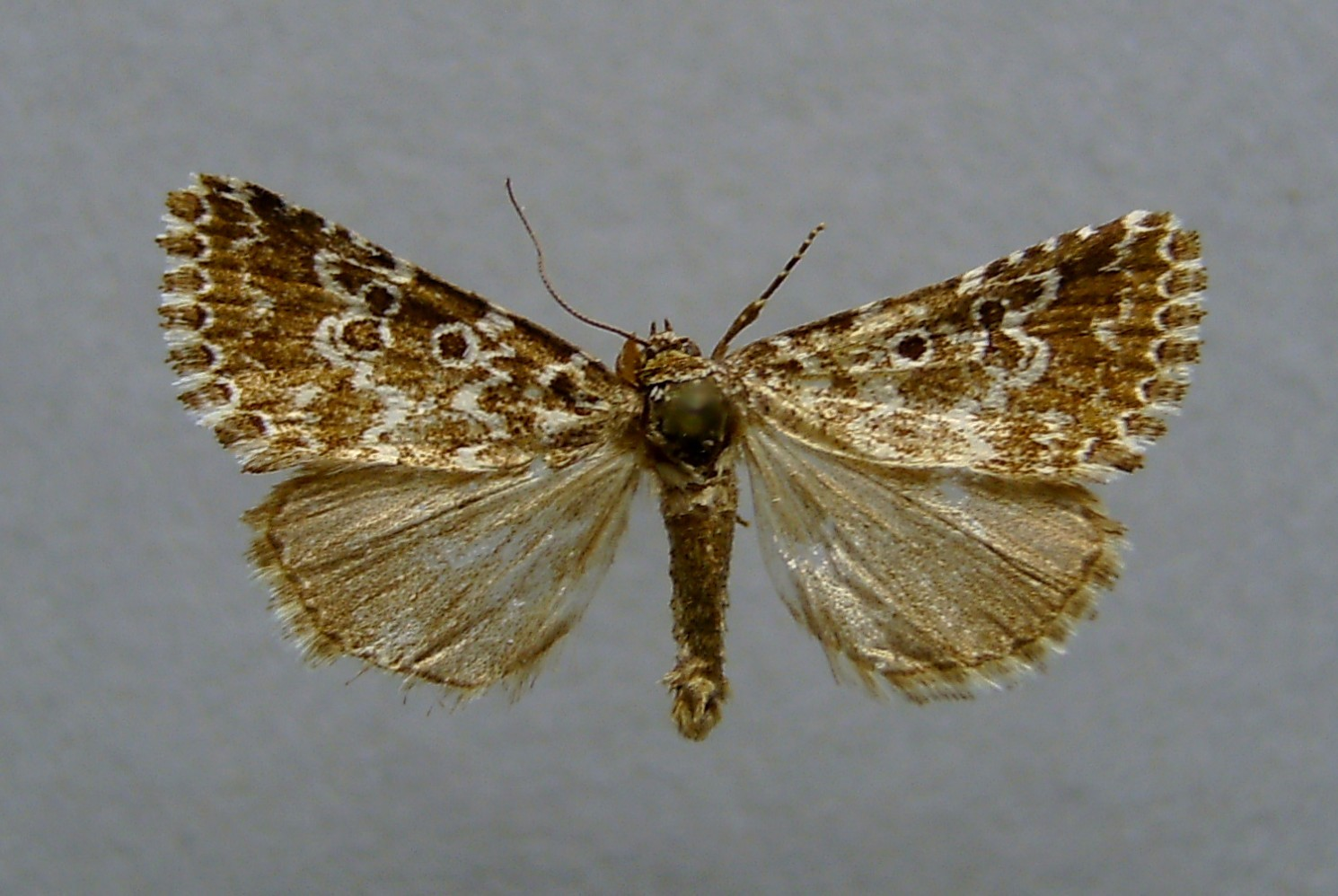
- Alvaradoia disjecta

Scientific classification
- Domain: Eukaryota
- Kingdom: Animalia
- Phylum: Arthropoda
- Class: Insecta
- Order: Lepidoptera
- Superfamily: Noctuoidea
- Family: Noctuidae
- Subfamily: Condicinae
- Genus: Alvaradoia; Agenjo, 1984

= Alvaradoia =

Genus of moths

Alvaradoia is a genus of moths of the family Noctuidae.

== Species ==
- Alvaradoia deserti (Oberthür, 1918) (North-west Africa)
- Alvaradoia disjecta (Rothschild, 1920) (eastern Spain and southern France)
- Alvaradoia numerica (Boisduval, 1840) (Corsica and Sardinia)
- Alvaradoia ornatula (Christoph, 1887) (western Turkmenistan)
