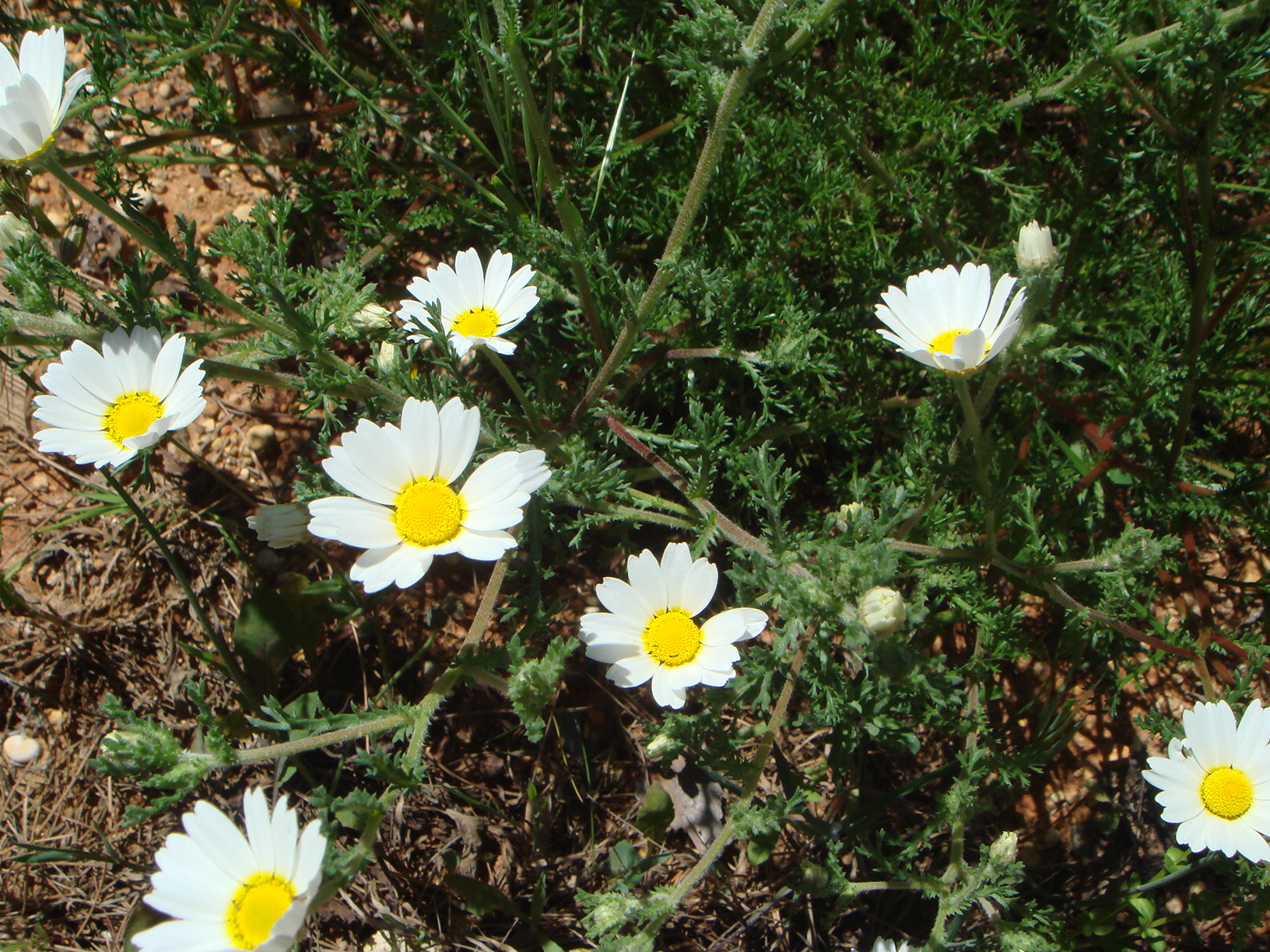

Scientific classification
- Kingdom: Plantae
- Clade: Tracheophytes
- Clade: Angiosperms
- Clade: Eudicots
- Clade: Asterids
- Order: Asterales
- Family: Asteraceae
- Genus: Cladanthus
- Species: C. mixtus

Binomial name
- Cladanthus mixtus (L.) Chevall. 1836

Synonyms
- Cladanthus mixtus (L.) Oberpr. & Vogt 2002, illegitimate duplicate publication; Anthemis mixta L.; Chamaemelum mixtum (L.) All.; Ormenis mixta (L.) Dumort.

= Cladanthus mixtus =

Species of flowering plant

Cladanthus mixtus, commonly known as the Moroccan chamomile, is a mostly Mediterranean species of flowering plant in the aster family, often considered a weed but is also distilled for essential oil, which changes in composition depending on where it grows.

== Distribution ==
Cladanthus mixtus is found throughout the Mediterranean Basin and Western Europe (from the Eastern Mediterranean west to the Canary Islands north to the British Isles), being especially prominent in western Iberia. It has been introduced to Madeira, the Azores, Uruguay and is sparingly naturalized in a few widely scattered locations in North America.

== Habitat and ecology ==
The Moroccan chamomile grows best in moist and rich soil, but it also has the ability to grow in soils that are more salty around the Mediterranean Sea. Cladanthus mixtus does not need extreme amounts of water as it can retain water because of its thicker cuticle, allowing the species to hold water for longer durations. Cladanthus mixtus can tolerate both warm/cool and hot environments. It is an annual plant and does not interact with other vegetation much.

== Morphology ==
Individuals of the species Cladanthus mixtus have a yellowish to orange base with white flower petals. Stems are about 4–10 cm long and the leaves of the plant are simple and ordinary in structure but are more like branching leaves. Petals are closely arranged together next to each other surrounding the flower.

== Flowers ==
Flowers of Cladanthus mixtus bloom only during a rainy season that provides the plant with enough water and nutrients to bloom. The plant is fully mature once the flowers bloom. The flower then dies after a rainy season and awaits the next rainy season to bloom once again.

=== Medicinal ===
Cladanthus mixtus has been used to collect certain oils to be used for perfumes and other skin products that calm people down and soothe their skin. The whole flower is crushed up to try to extract these oils. A study confirms that the Cladanthus mixtus species has different oil compositions depending on the area in which the plant is grown. In some areas the concentrations of the oils would be higher than that of the same species in different areas. In some cases the same species was found to produce oils that would not be used in mixtures of skin ointments and other products.

== Sources ==
- USDA, ARS, National Genetic Resources Program 2012
- Elouaddari, A., 2013: Yield and chemical composition of the essential oil of Moroccan chamomile [Cladanthus mixtus (L.) Chevall.] growing wild at different sites in Morocco in Flavour and Fragrance Journal
