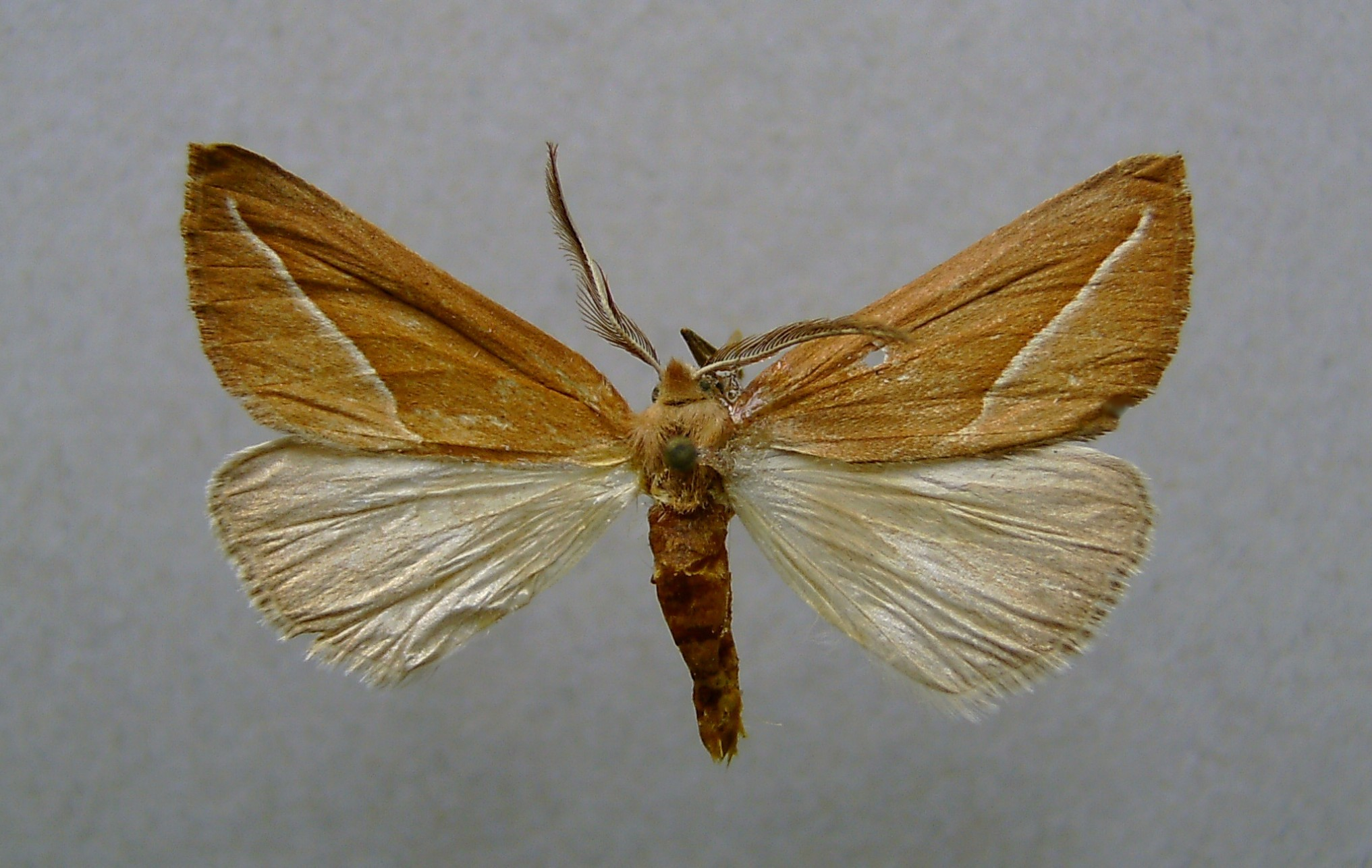
- Male
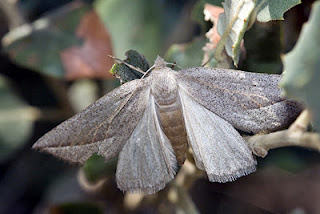
- Living specimen

Scientific classification
- Domain: Eukaryota
- Kingdom: Animalia
- Phylum: Arthropoda
- Class: Insecta
- Order: Lepidoptera
- Family: Geometridae
- Genus: Compsoptera
- Species: C. opacaria

Binomial name
- Compsoptera opacaria (Hübner, 1819)

Synonyms
- Geometra opacaria Hubner, 1819; Compsoptera aemiliorum Raineri, 1994

= Compsoptera opacaria =

Species of moth

Compsoptera opacaria is a moth of the family Geometridae. It is found in south-western Europe, including Spain, Portugal, France and Italy.

The wingspan is 34–45 mm. Adults are on wing from August to October in one generation per year.

The larvae feed on the leaves of various plants, including Genista, Thymus, Juniperus and Calluna vulgaris.
