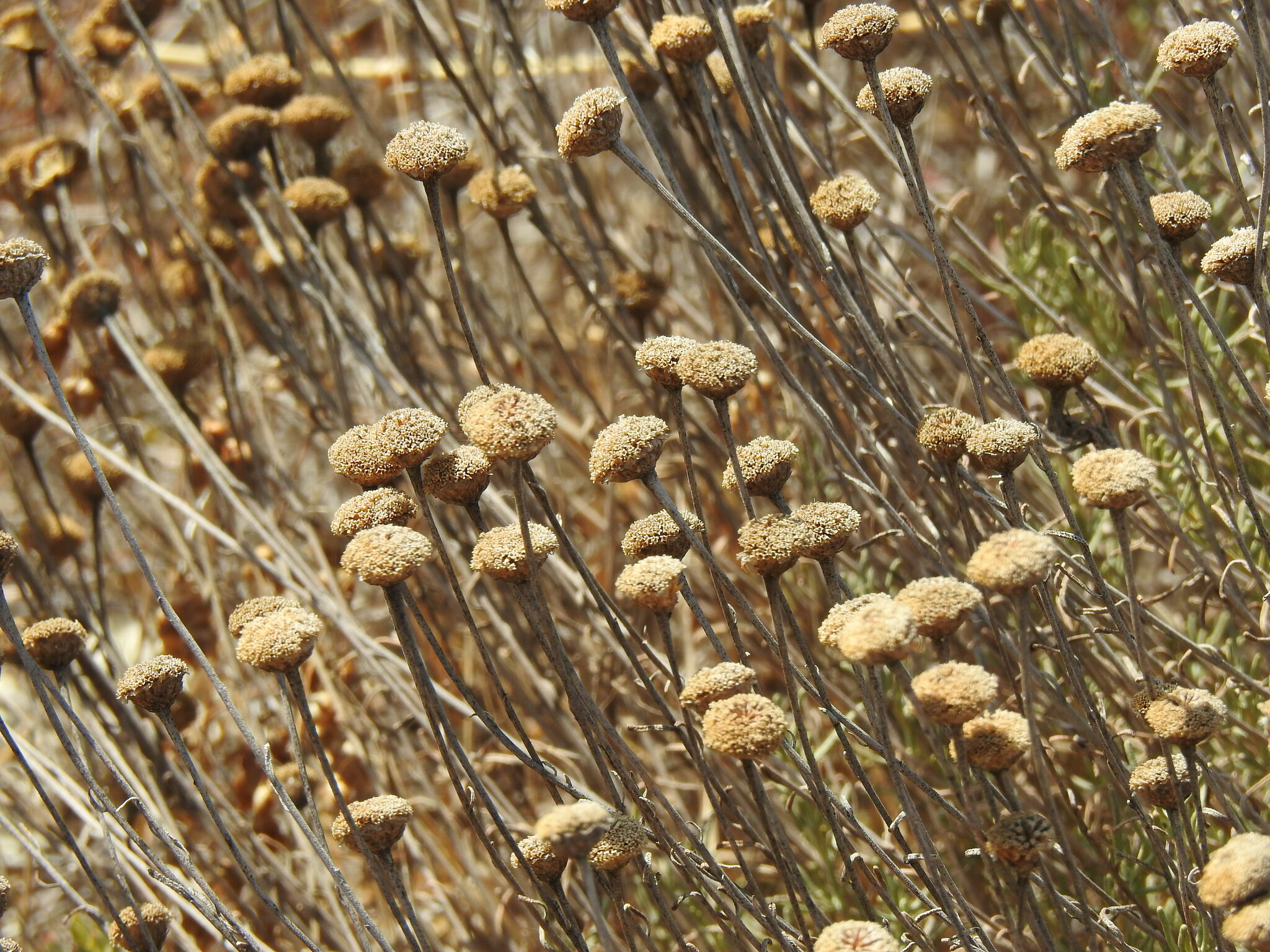

Conservation status
- Least Concern (IUCN 3.1)

- Least Concern (IUCN 3.1)

Scientific classification
- Kingdom: Plantae
- Clade: Tracheophytes
- Clade: Angiosperms
- Clade: Eudicots
- Clade: Asterids
- Order: Asterales
- Family: Asteraceae
- Genus: Santolina
- Species: S. impressa

Binomial name
- Santolina impressa Hoffmanns. & Link

Synonyms
- Thymus villosus Willd. ex Benth

= Santolina impressa =

Species of flowering plant

Santolina impressa is a species of flowering plant in the family Asteraceae, endemic to southwest Portugal specifically the area between Setúbal and Sines. It inhabits psammophilous scrub in stabilized dunes (often paleodunes), sometimes under pine forests. On acidic sandy soils, becoming particularly abundant in somewhat disturbed places.
