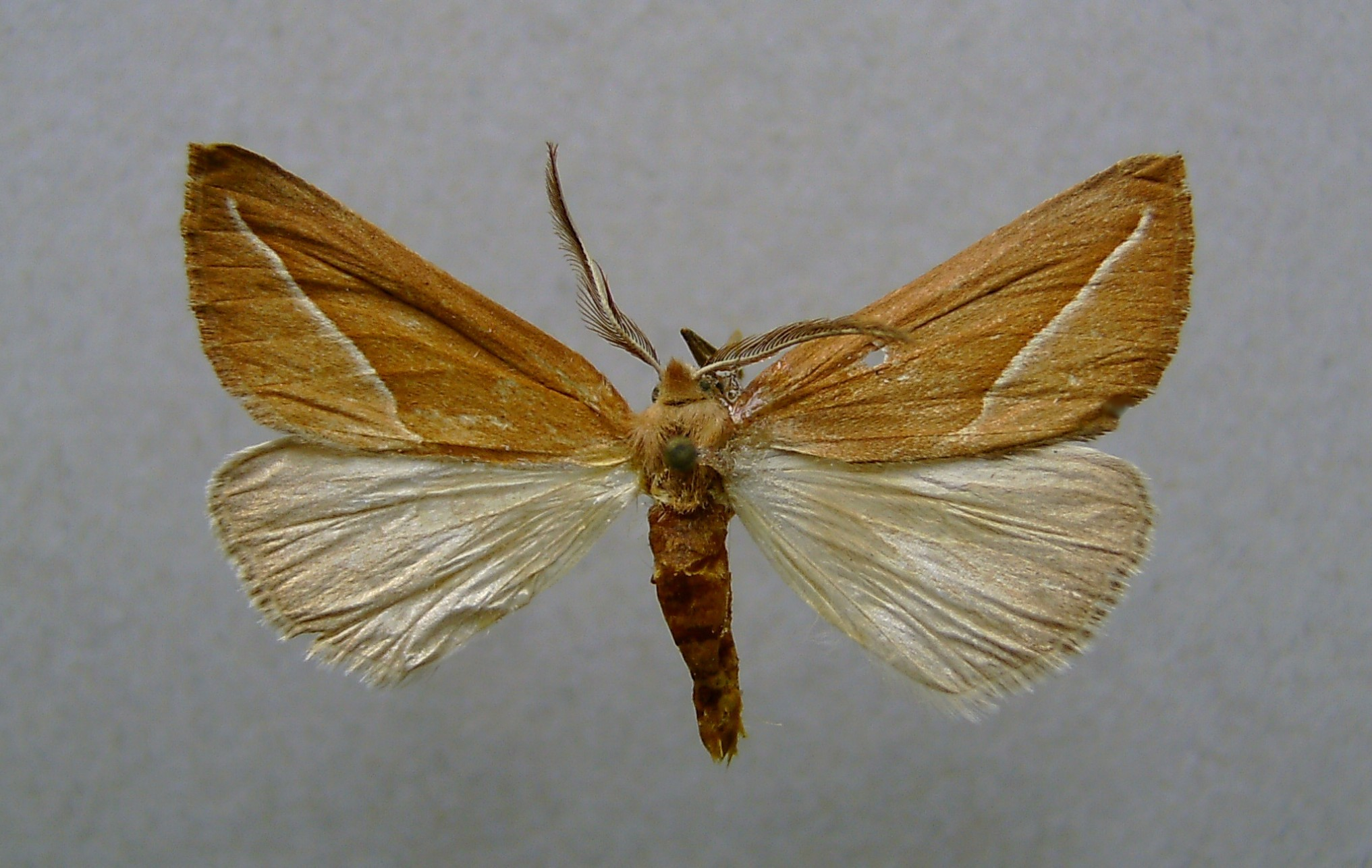
- Compsoptera opacaria

Scientific classification
- Kingdom: Animalia
- Phylum: Arthropoda
- Class: Insecta
- Order: Lepidoptera
- Family: Geometridae
- Subfamily: Ennominae
- Genus: Compsoptera; Blanchard, 1845

= Compsoptera =

Genus of moths

Compsoptera is a genus of moths in the family Geometridae.

== Species ==
- Compsoptera argentaria (Herrich-Schäffer, 1839)
- Compsoptera caesaraugustanus Redondo, 1995
- Compsoptera jourdanaria (Serres, 1826)
- Compsoptera opacaria (Hübner, 1819)
