= Compsoptera caesaraugustanus =

Scientific classification
- Domain: Eukaryota
- Kingdom: Animalia
- Phylum: Arthropoda
- Class: Insecta
- Order: Lepidoptera
- Family: Geometridae
- Genus: Compsoptera
- Species: C. caesaraugustanus

Binomial name
- Compsoptera caesaraugustanus Redondo, 1995

Species of moth

Compsoptera caesaraugustanus is a moth of the family Geometridae. It was described by Redondo in 1995. It is found in Spain.
