= Isocarpha fistulosa =

Scientific classification
- Kingdom: Plantae
- Clade: Tracheophytes
- Clade: Angiosperms
- Clade: Eudicots
- Clade: Asterids
- Order: Asterales
- Family: Asteraceae
- Genus: Isocarpha
- Species: I. fistulosa

Binomial name
- Isocarpha fistulosa D.J. Keil & Stuessy 1981

Species of plant

Isocarpha fistulosa is a New World species of plants in the family Asteraceae. It has been found only in Peru and Ecuador.

Isocarpha fistulosa is an annual herb up to 70 cm (28 in) tall. Leaves are up to 4 cm (1 1/2 in) long. One plant produces several flower heads, each head with 120–150 white disc flowers but no ray flowers.
