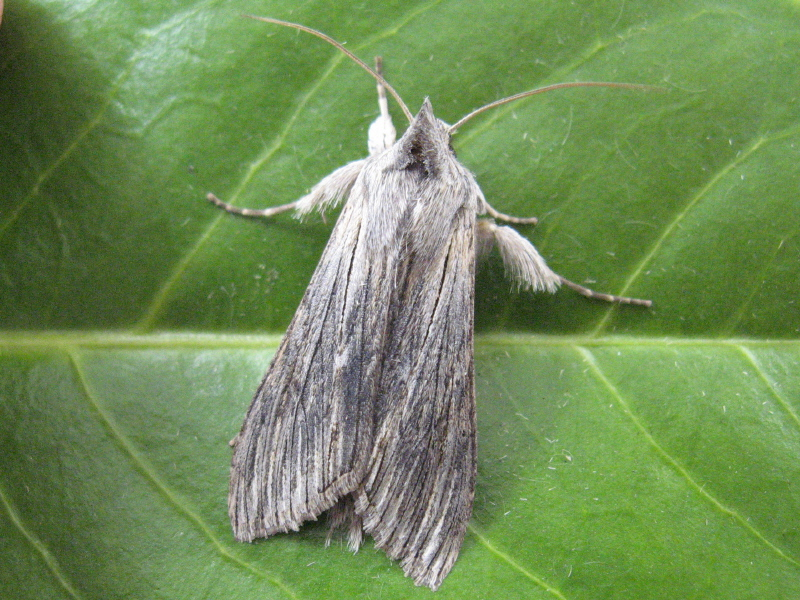
- Adult
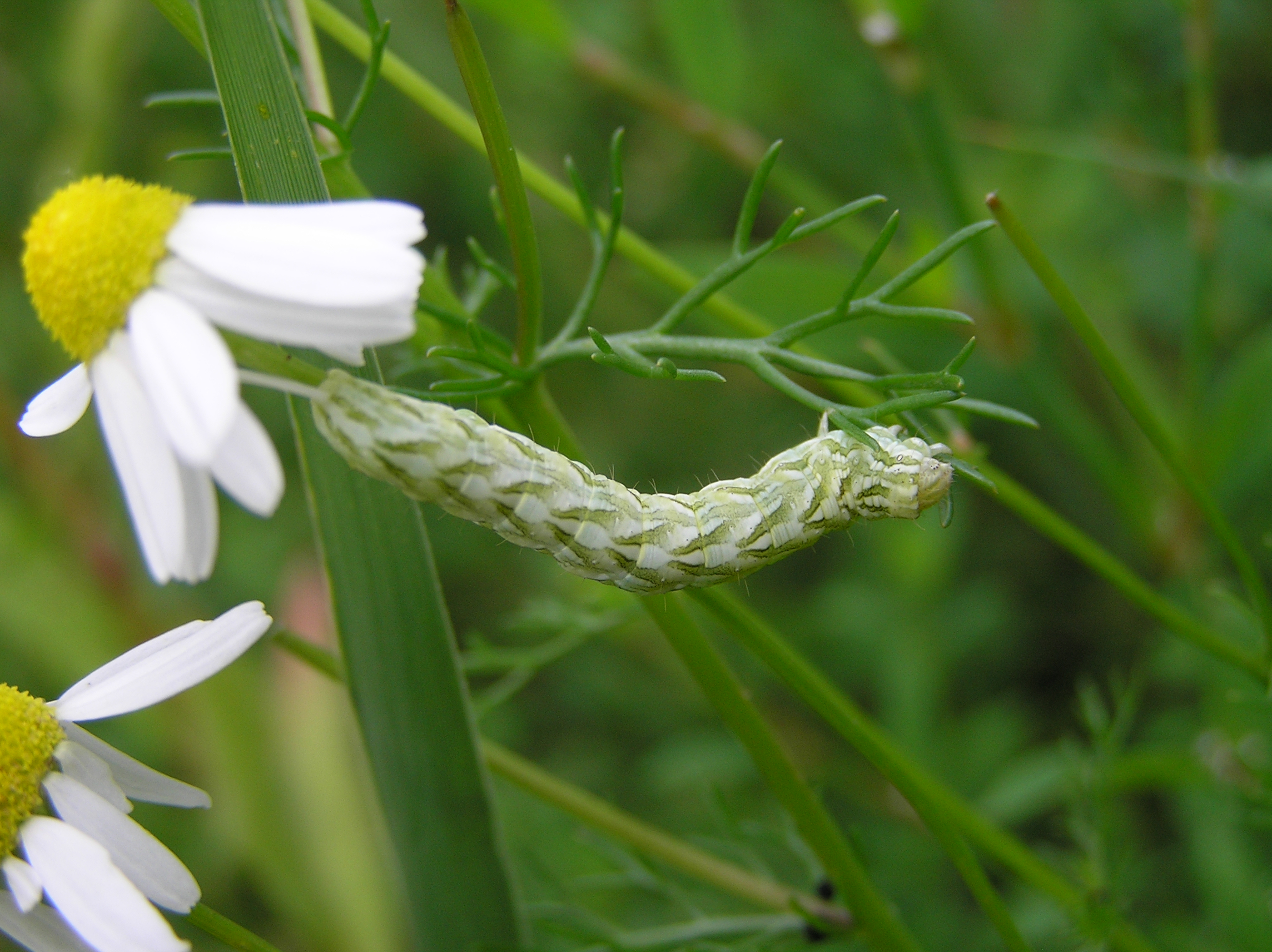
- Larva

Scientific classification
- Kingdom: Animalia
- Phylum: Arthropoda
- Clade: Pancrustacea
- Class: Insecta
- Order: Lepidoptera
- Superfamily: Noctuoidea
- Family: Noctuidae
- Genus: Cucullia
- Species: C. chamomillae

Binomial name
- Cucullia chamomillae (Denis & Schiffermüller, 1775)

= Cucullia chamomillae =

Species of moth

Cucullia chamomillae, the chamomile shark, is a moth of the family Noctuidae. The species was first described by the Austrian Lepidopterists, Michael Denis and Ignaz Schiffermüller in 1775. It is found in Europe, the Near East and North Africa.

== Description ==
The wingspan is 40–42 mm: Forewing long and narrow with produced apex; abdomen elongate especially in male, with lengthened anal tufts. Forewing grey brown; veins distinctly black; a whitish spot on submedian fold between the angles of inner and outer lines, which are more distinct in their lower portions; stigmata very indistinct, sometimes denoted by black points on their margins: a fine black streak from base along submedian fold; a black streak above middle of vein 4, and below terminal end of vein 2; a row of whitish streaks in the subterminal intervals; hindwing brown, paler towards base, especially in the male. - in chrysanthemi Hbn., found more especially in the Alps, in N. Germany, and Hungary, the forewing is suffused with dark smoky fuscous, especially in median area, the hindwing also becoming deeper brown;- leucanthemi Rmb. from Andalusia is a yellower form. In the related Cucullia calendulae Tr. the ground colour is paler grey and the markings slighter The length of the forewings is 19–23 mm. The egg is cone-shaped, blunt at the upper end and covered with many ribs. It has a white colour, from which small reddish brown spots stand out. Mature caterpillars appear in different coloured morphs. They show on the back wide slashes in the form of a slightly open V as well as clear bowed strokes on the sides. The basic colour varies from whitish, cream, greenish, light brown, reddish brown or violet to blackish. The spiracles are bordered white and black. The head is dark spotted. The pupa has a yellowish brown color. The proboscis Sheath stands out clearly. The cremaster is flat, slightly curved and spatula-shaped.

== Similar species ==
- Cucullia umbratica
- Cucullia calendulae
- Cucullia santolinae
- Cucullia inderiensis Herrich-Schäffer, 1855

== Biology ==
The moth flies from April to June depending on the location.

The larvae feed on chamomiles, especially Matricaria perforata.

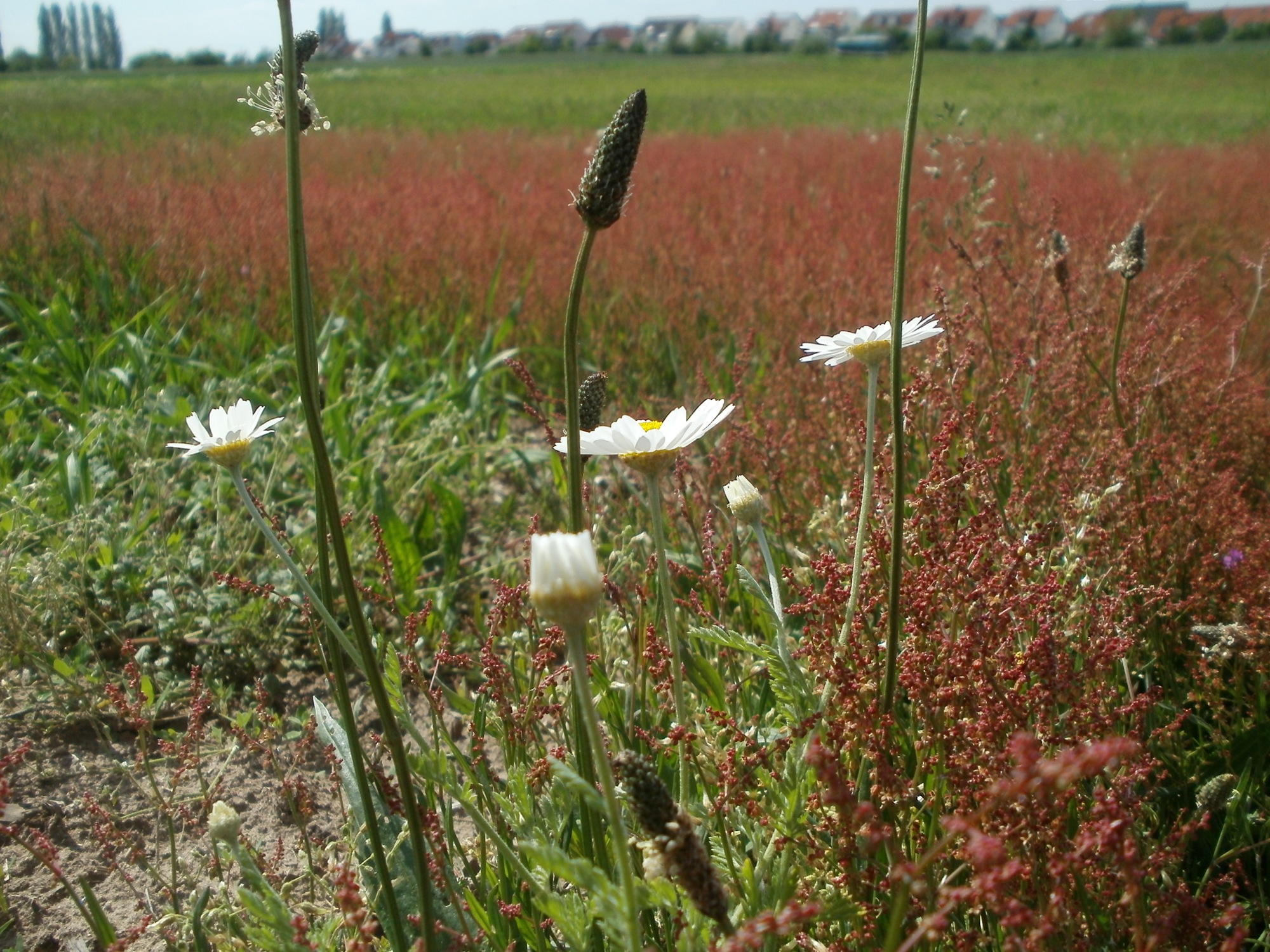
Habitat, Germany

== Taxonomy ==
The genus Cucullia, was raised by the German priest, botanist and entomologist, Franz von Paula Schrank in 1802. The name is from cucullus, a cowl or a hood: ″from the prominent cowl-like thoracic crest.″ Cucullia was originally a family name and has also been used for the subfamily. The species is named after one of the food plants, chamomile, hence chamomillae.
