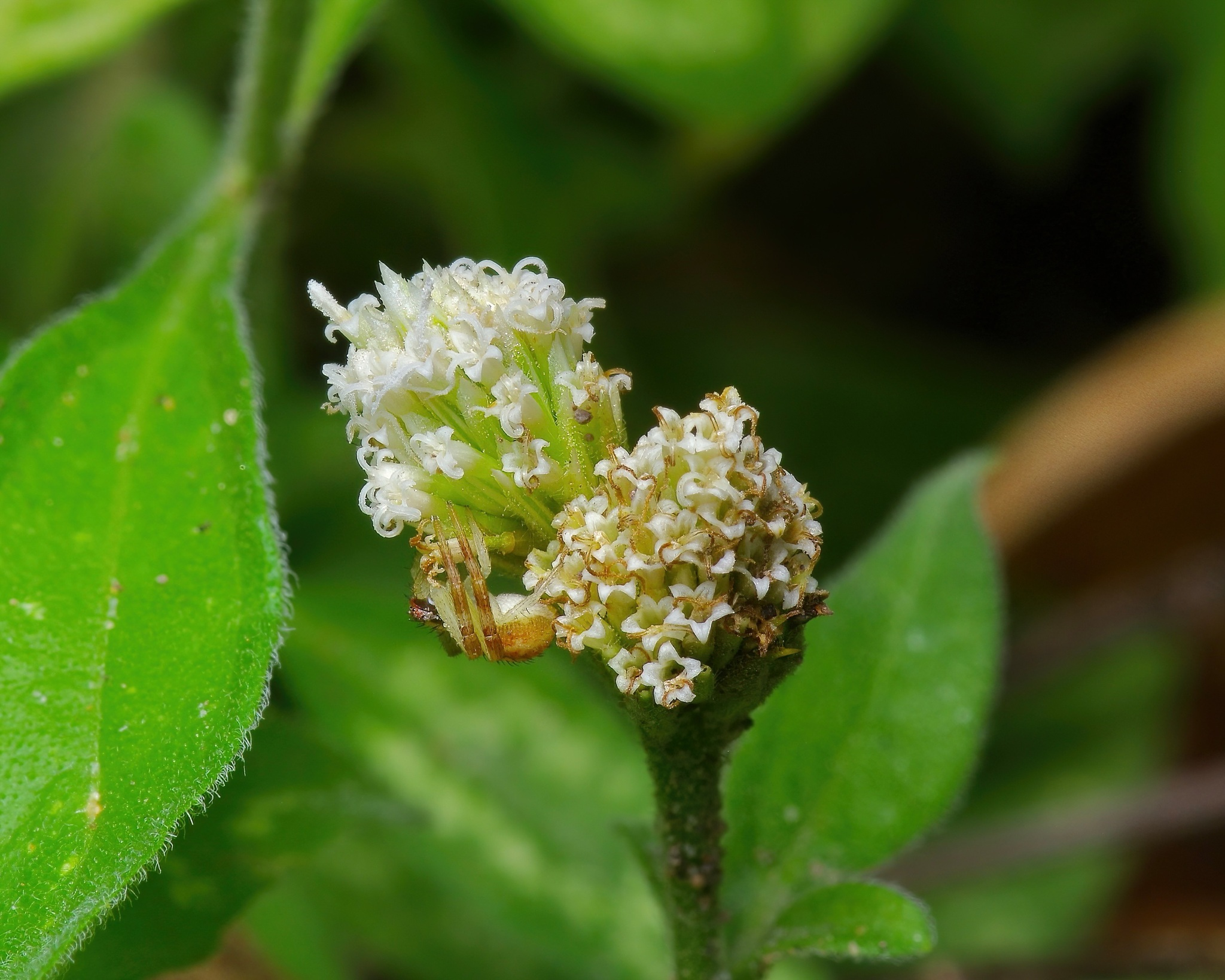

Scientific classification
- Kingdom: Plantae
- Clade: Tracheophytes
- Clade: Angiosperms
- Clade: Eudicots
- Clade: Asterids
- Order: Asterales
- Family: Asteraceae
- Genus: Isocarpha
- Species: I. oppositifolia

Binomial name
- Isocarpha oppositifolia (L.) Cass. 1822, conserved name not R.Br. 1817

Synonyms
- Synonymy: Calea oppositifolia (L.) L.; Dunantia achyranthes DC.; Isocarpha angustata Griseb.; Isocarpha atriplicifolia subsp. glabrata (S.F.Blake) Borhidi; Isocarpha glabrata S.F.Blake; Isocarpha oppositifolia (L.) R.Br.; Isocarpha tricephala Cass.; Santolina oppositifolia L. 1759

= Isocarpha oppositifolia =

Species of flowering plant

Isocarpha oppositifolia, the Rio Grande pearlhead, is a New World species of plants in the family Asteraceae. It is widely distributed in eastern and southern Mexico, Central America, the West Indies (Cuba, Jamaica, Bahamas, Caymans, Trinidad), and northern South America (Colombia, Venezuela). The range extends northward, just barely crossing to the north side of the Río Grande in the two southernmost counties in Texas (Cameron + Hidalgo).

Isocarpha oppositifolia is an herb or subshrub up to 150 cm (4.9 ft) tall. Leaves are up to 15 cm (5.9 in) long, usually narrow but sometimes egg-shaped. One plant produces several flower heads, each a long flower stalk, each head with 60-150 disc flowers but no ray flowers.
