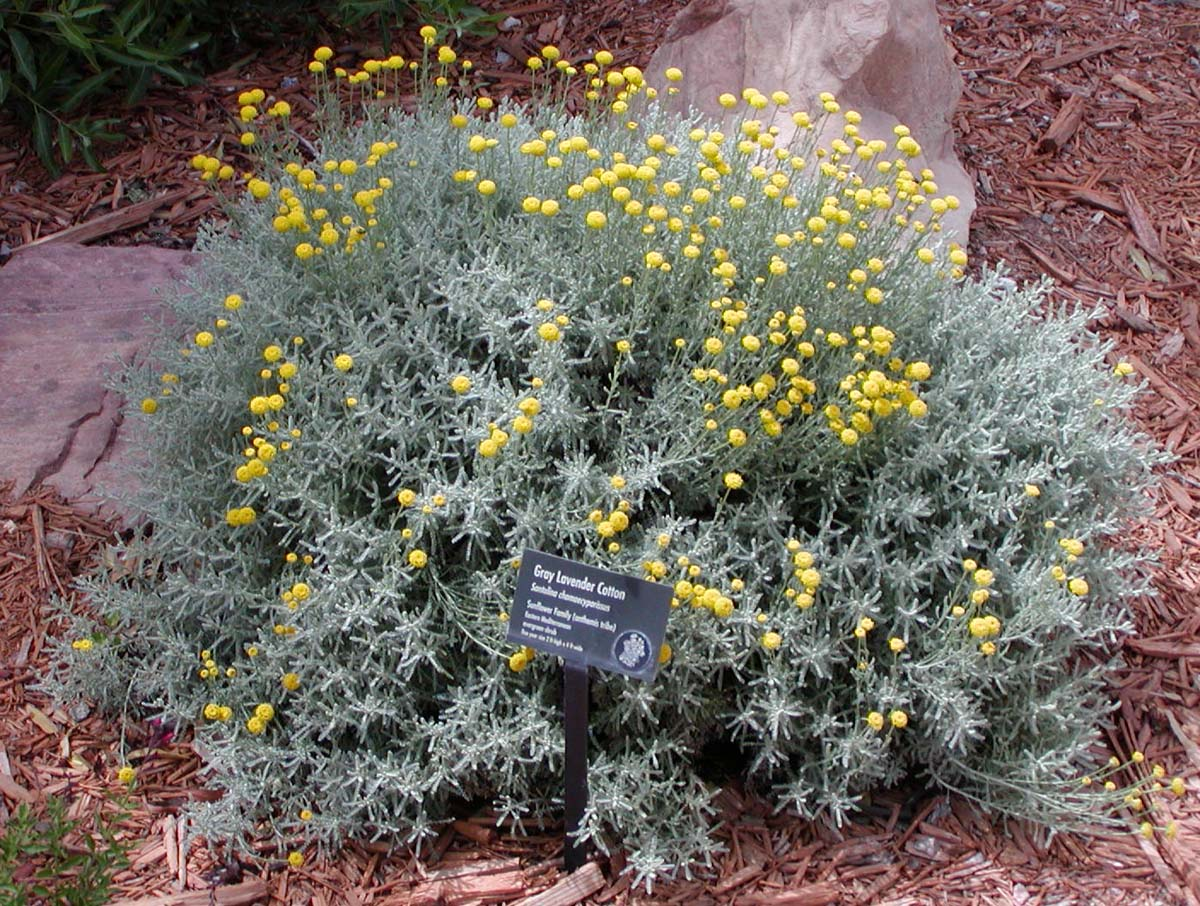
- Santolina chamaecyparissus

Scientific classification
- Kingdom: Plantae
- Clade: Tracheophytes
- Clade: Angiosperms
- Clade: Eudicots
- Clade: Asterids
- Order: Asterales
- Family: Asteraceae
- Subfamily: Asteroideae
- Tribe: Anthemideae
- Genus: Santolina; L.

Type species
- Santolina chamaecyparissus L.

Synonyms
- Chamomilla (Hall) Gray

= Santolina =

Genus of plants

Santolina is a genus of plants in the chamomile tribe within the sunflower family, primarily from the western Mediterranean region.

They are small evergreen shrubs growing 10–60 cm (4–24 in) tall. The leaves are simple and minute in some species, or pinnate, finely divided in other species, often densely silvery hairy, and usually aromatic. The composite flowerheads are yellow or white, produced in dense globose capitula 1–2 cm in diameter, on top of slender stems held 10–25 cm (4–10 in) above the foliage. There are no ray florets.

Santolina species are used as food plants by the larvae of some Lepidoptera species including Bucculatrix santolinella (feeds exclusively on S. chamaecyparissus) and the Coleophora case-bearers C. albicella (recorded on S. chamaecyparissus), C. involucrella (feeds exclusively on Santolina spp) and C. santolinella (feeds exclusively on S. chamaecyparissus).

== Species ==
Sources:

- Santolina africana Jord. & Fourr. - Algeria, Morocco, Tunisia
- Santolina benthamiana Jord. & Fourr. - France, Spain
- Santolina canescens Lag. – Spain
- Santolina chamaecyparissus L. – from Spain to Ireland + Turkey
- Santolina corsica Jord. & Fourr. – Corsica
- Santolina decumbens Mill. – France, Spain
- Santolina ericoides Poir. – France, Spain
- Santolina impressa Hoffmanns. & Link – Portugal
- Santolina magonica (O.Bolòs, Molin. & P.Monts.) Romo – Balearic Islands, Spain
- Santolina melidensis (Rodr.Oubiña & S.Ortiz) Rodr.Oubiña & S.Ortiz – Spain
- Santolina neapolitana Jord. & Fourr. – Campania, Italy
- Santolina oblongifolia Boiss. – Spain
- Santolina pectinata Lag. – Algeria, Morocco, Spain
- Santolina pinnata Viv. – Tuscany, Italy
- Santolina rosmarinifolia L. – south western Europe
- Santolina semidentata Hoffmanns. & Link – Spain, Portugal
- Santolina tinctoria Molina – Chile
- Santolina villosa Mill. – Spain
- Santolina virens Mill. – France, Spain, UK, Germany, Abruzzo (Italy), Ukraine

=== formerly included ===
numerous species formerly regarded as members of Santolina but now judged better suited to other genera: Achillea, Athanasia, Anthemis, Calea, Cladanthus, Helenium, Isocarpha, Lasiospermum, Lonas, Matricaria, Oedera, Porophyllum, Salmea, and Tanacetum.
