= Compsoptera argentaria =

Scientific classification
- Domain: Eukaryota
- Kingdom: Animalia
- Phylum: Arthropoda
- Class: Insecta
- Order: Lepidoptera
- Family: Geometridae
- Genus: Compsoptera
- Species: C. argentaria

Binomial name
- Compsoptera argentaria (Herrich-Schäffer, 1839)

Synonyms
- Aspilates argentaria Herrich-Schäffer, 1839; Ligia yaminaria Oberthur, 1881

Species of moth

Compsoptera argentaria is a moth of the family Geometridae. It was described by Gottlieb August Wilhelm Herrich-Schäffer in 1839. It is found on Sicily.
