= Isocarpha atriplicifolia =

Spanish Pearlhead

Scientific classification
- Kingdom: Plantae
- Clade: Tracheophytes
- Clade: Angiosperms
- Clade: Eudicots
- Clade: Asterids
- Order: Asterales
- Family: Asteraceae
- Genus: Isocarpha
- Species: I. atriplicifolia

Binomial name
- Isocarpha atriplicifolia (L.) R.Br. ex DC. 1836

Synonyms
- Synonymy: Bidens atriplicifolia L. 1756; Calydermos atriplicifolius (L.) Spreng.; Isocarpha alternifolia Cass.; Isocarpha bilbergiana Schlecht. & Cham.; Isocarpha billbergiana Less.; Isocarpha cabana S.F.Blake; Spilanthes atriplicifolius (L.) L.

Species of flowering plant

Isocarpha atriplicifolia, the spanish pearlhead, is a New World species of plants in the family Asteraceae. It is widely distributed in southern Mexico (Guerrero, Oaxaca, Chiapas), Central America, the West Indies (Cuba, Dominican Republic, Trinidad), and northern South America (Colombia, Venezuela, northeastern Brazil (Maranhão)).

Isocarpha atriplicifolia is an annual or perennial herb up to 120 cm (4 feet) tall. Leaves are up to 10 cm (4 inches) long. One plant produces several flower heads, each a long flower stalk, each head with many white disc flowers but no ray flowers.
