= Isocarpha =

Scientific classification
- Kingdom: Plantae
- Clade: Embryophytes
- Clade: Tracheophytes
- Clade: Angiosperms
- Clade: Eudicots
- Clade: Asterids
- Order: Asterales
- Family: Asteraceae
- Subfamily: Asteroideae
- Tribe: Eupatorieae
- Genus: Isocarpha; R.Br. 1817 not Less. 1830

Type species
- Santolina oppositifolia L.

Synonyms
- Dunantia DC.

Genus of flowering plants

Isocarpha (pearlhead) is a genus of flowering plants in the family Asteraceae. They are native to Mexico, Central America, the West Indies, and northern South America, with the range of one species extending north into the United States.

== Classification ==
Although it is generally assigned to the tribe Eupatorieae, the flowers are unusual for that tribe. It is believed to have evolved from an ancestor which more closely resembles other Eupatorieae.

Species

- Isocarpha atriplicifolia (L.) R.Br. ex DC. - Chiapas, Guerrero, Cuba, Hispaniola, Central America, Colombia, Venezuela
- Isocarpha fistulosa Keil & Stuessy - Peru, Ecuador
- Isocarpha megacephala Mattf. - eastern Brazil (Bahia, Pernambuco, Paraíba)
- Isocarpha microcephala (DC.) S.F.Blake - Peru, Ecuador
- Isocarpha oppositifolia (L.) Cass. - Mesoamerica, northern South America, West Indies, extreme southern Texas
