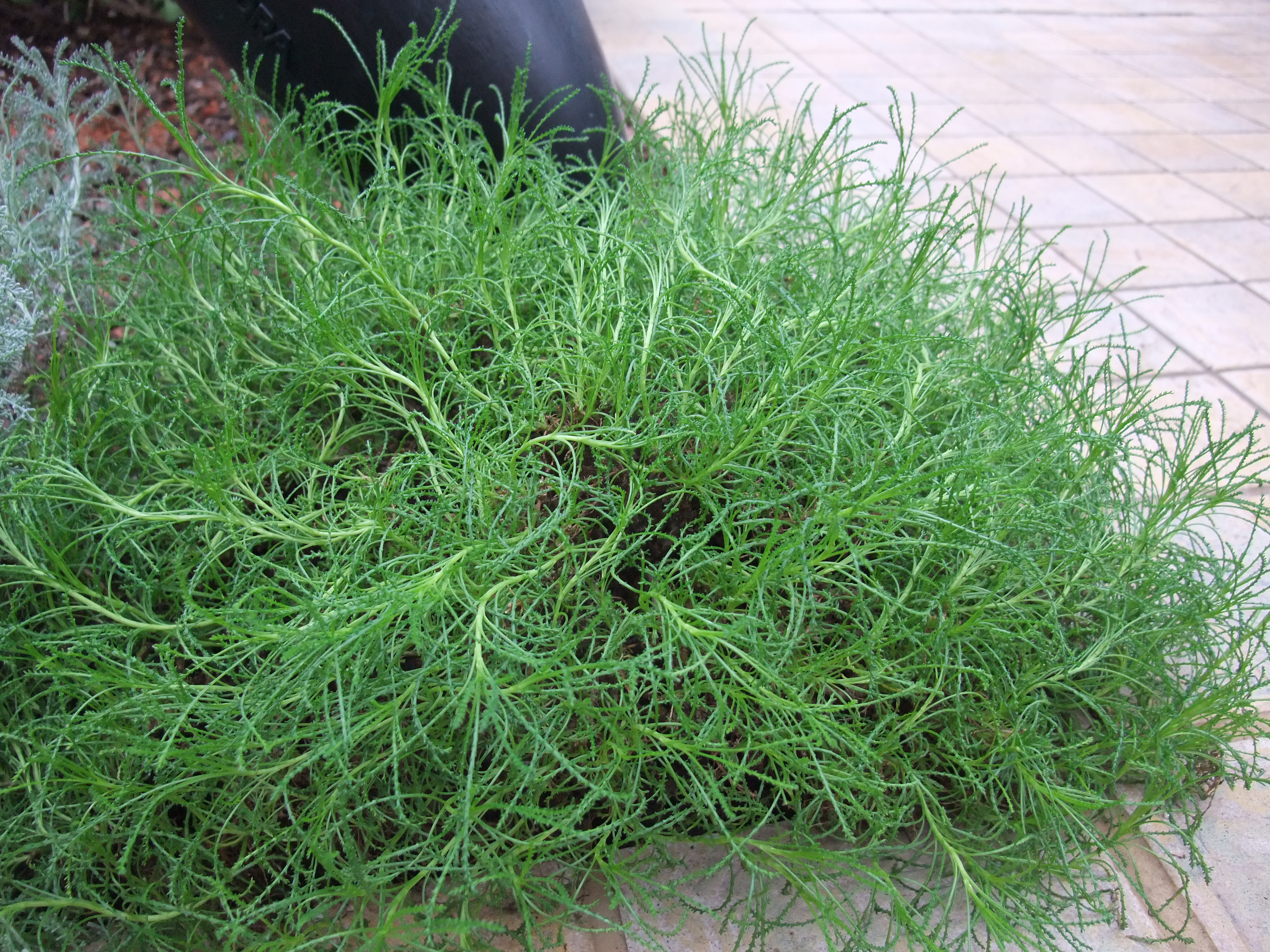

Scientific classification
- Kingdom: Plantae
- Clade: Tracheophytes
- Clade: Angiosperms
- Clade: Eudicots
- Clade: Asterids
- Order: Asterales
- Family: Asteraceae
- Genus: Santolina
- Species: S. rosmarinifolia

Binomial name
- Santolina rosmarinifolia L.

= Santolina rosmarinifolia =

Species of plant

Santolina rosmarinifolia, the holy flax, is a species of flowering plant in the daisy family Asteraceae, native to south western Europe. It is a dense, compact evergreen shrub growing to 60 cm (24 in) tall and wide, with narrow, aromatic green leaves and tight yellow composite flowerheads carried on slender stalks above the foliage, in summer.

The Latin specific epithet rosmarinifolia describes the leaves' passing resemblance to those of rosemary.

In cultivation it is useful as groundcover or as an edging plant for sunny, well-drained situations. It dislikes winter wetness, and can be short-lived. The cultivar ‘Lemon Fizz’ and the dwarf cultivar S. rosmarinifolia subsp. rosmarinifolia 'Primrose Gem' have gained the Royal Horticultural Society's Award of Garden Merit.

Also known as olive herb or Wadi tops, the leaves of S. rosmarinifolia can be used in Mediterranean dishes and cocktails to add an olive-like flavour.
