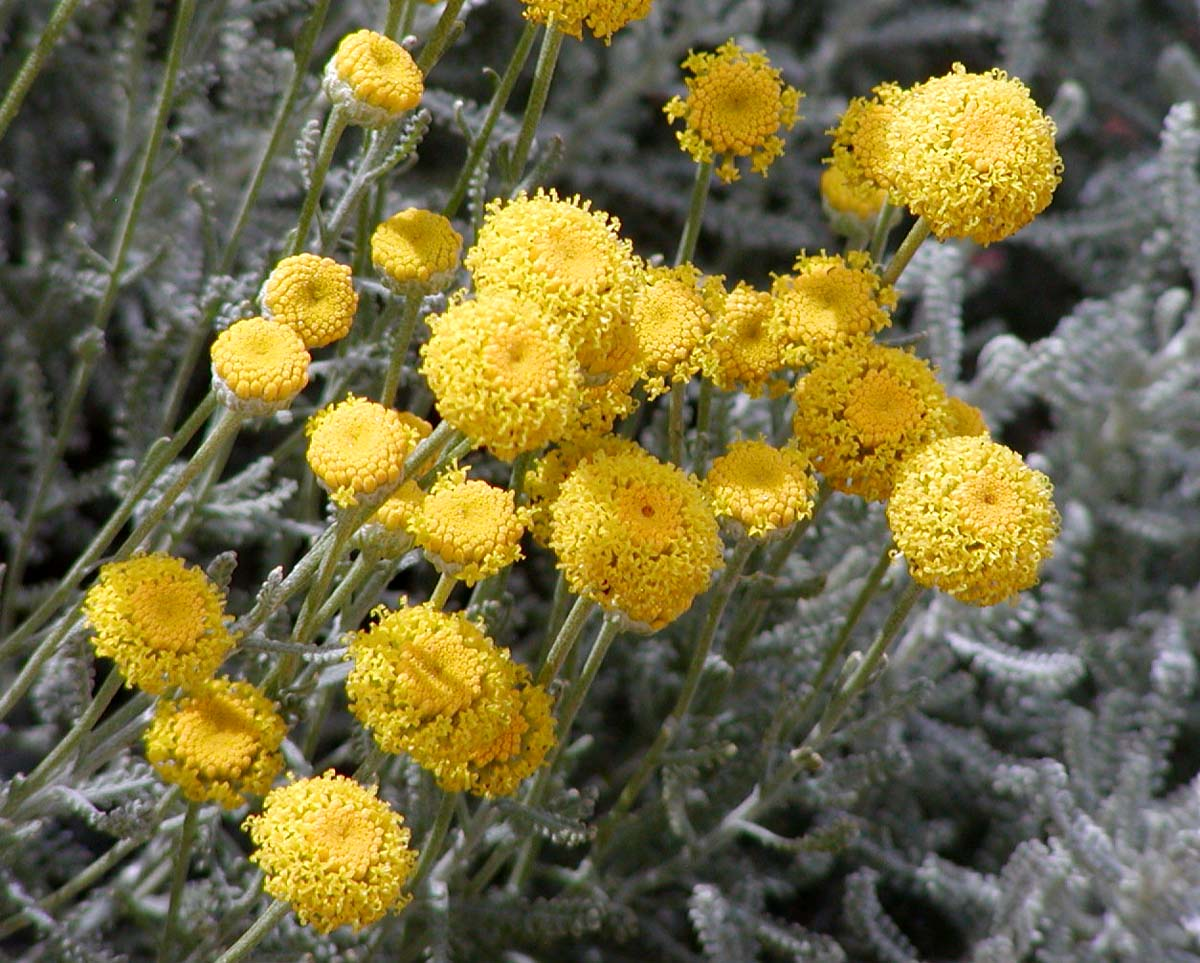

Scientific classification
- Kingdom: Plantae
- Clade: Tracheophytes
- Clade: Angiosperms
- Clade: Eudicots
- Clade: Asterids
- Order: Asterales
- Family: Asteraceae
- Genus: Santolina
- Species: S. chamaecyparissus

Binomial name
- Santolina chamaecyparissus L.

Synonyms
- Santolina marchii Arrigoni

= Santolina chamaecyparissus =

Species of flowering plant

Santolina chamaecyparissus (syn. S. incana), known as cotton lavender or lavender-cotton, is a species of flowering plant in the family Asteraceae, native to the western and central Mediterranean.

== Nomenclature ==
The specific epithet chamaecyparissus means "like Chamaecyparis" (ground cypress), though it is not closely related to that plant. It is also not closely related to either cotton or lavender, despite its common name "cotton lavender". Recognized varieties or subspecies are

- var. etrusca Lacaita ≡ S. etrusca (Lacaita) Marchi & D'Amato
- subsp. magonica O. Bolòs, Molin. & P. Monts. ≡ S. magonica (O. Bolòs, Molin. & P. Monts.) Romo, = var. teucrietorum O. Bolòs & Vigo
- var. pectinata f. insularis Gennari ex Fiori ≡ S. insularis (Gennari ex Fiori) Arrigoni
- var. vedranensis O. Bolòs & Vigo ≡ S. vedranensis (O. Bolòs & Vigo) L. Sáez, M. Serrano, S. Ortiz & R. Carbajal

== Description ==
It is a small evergreen shrub growing to 50 cm (20 in) tall and broad. Densely covered in aromatic, grey-green leaves, in summer it produces masses of yellow, button-like composite flowerheads, held on slender stems above the foliage. The disc florets are tubular and there are no ray florets.

== Cultivation ==
This plant is valued in cultivation as groundcover or as an edging plant for a hot, sunny, well-drained spot, though it may be short-lived. Once established, plants can tolerate dry and poor soils. Its compact shape can be maintained by cutting back in spring.

Numerous cultivars have been produced, of which 'Nana', a dwarf form growing to 25 cm (10 in), has gained the Royal Horticultural Society's Award of Garden Merit.

== Uses ==
In cosmetics it is used as a tonic. It is an effective fumigant

== Pathogens ==
- Phytophthora tentaculata

== Photo gallery ==
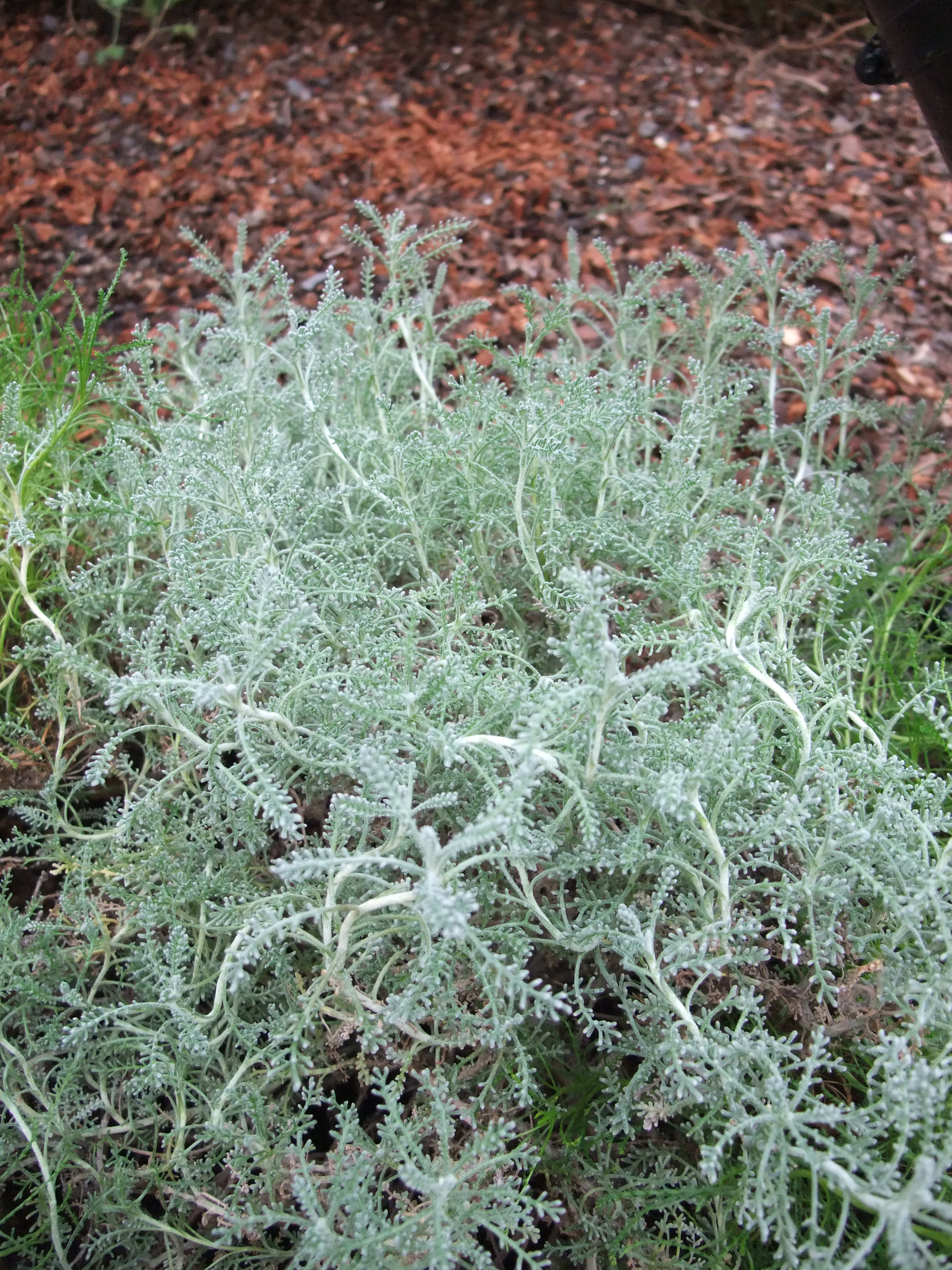
Foliage

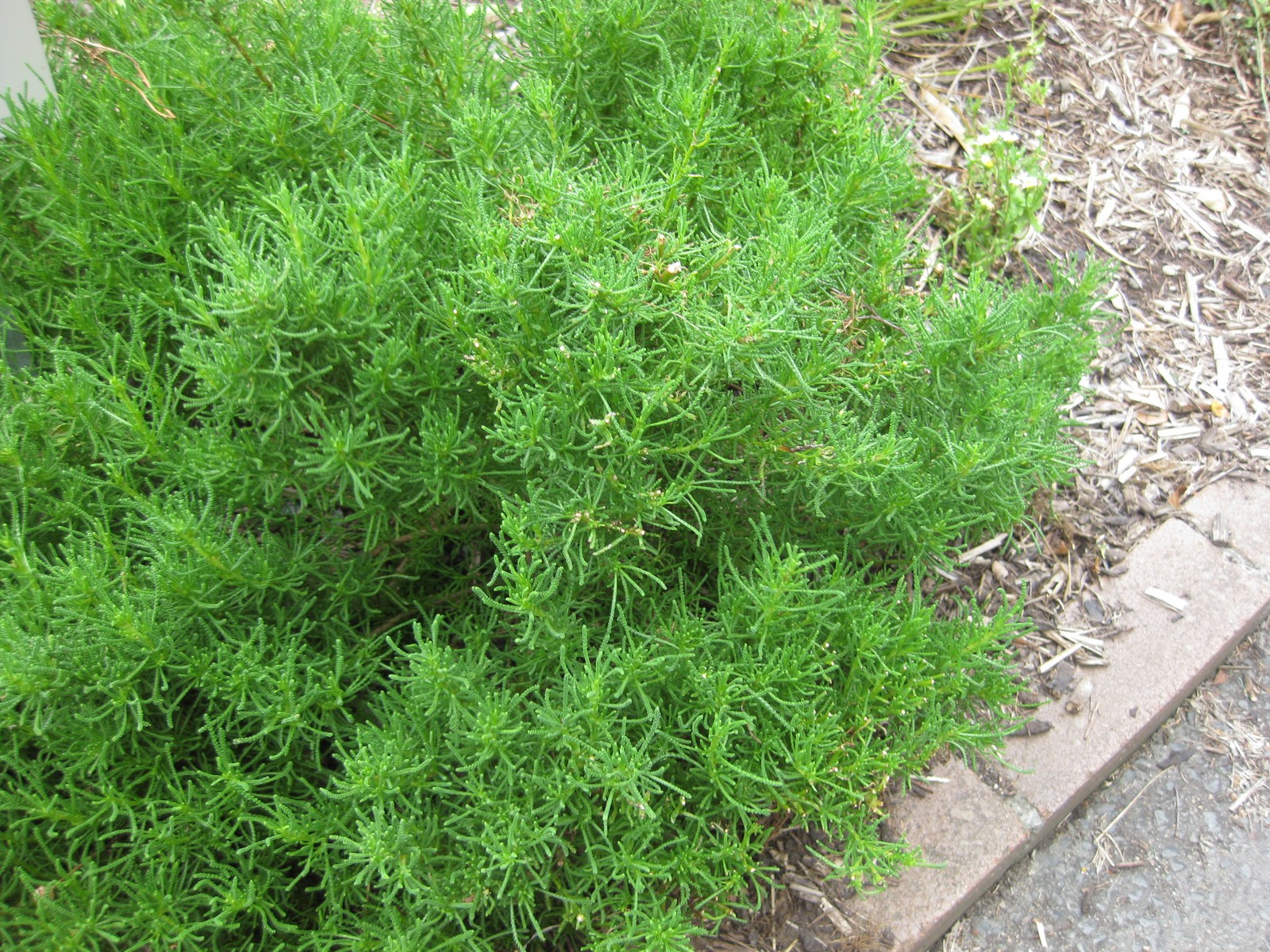
S. chamaecyparissus 'Lime Fizz'

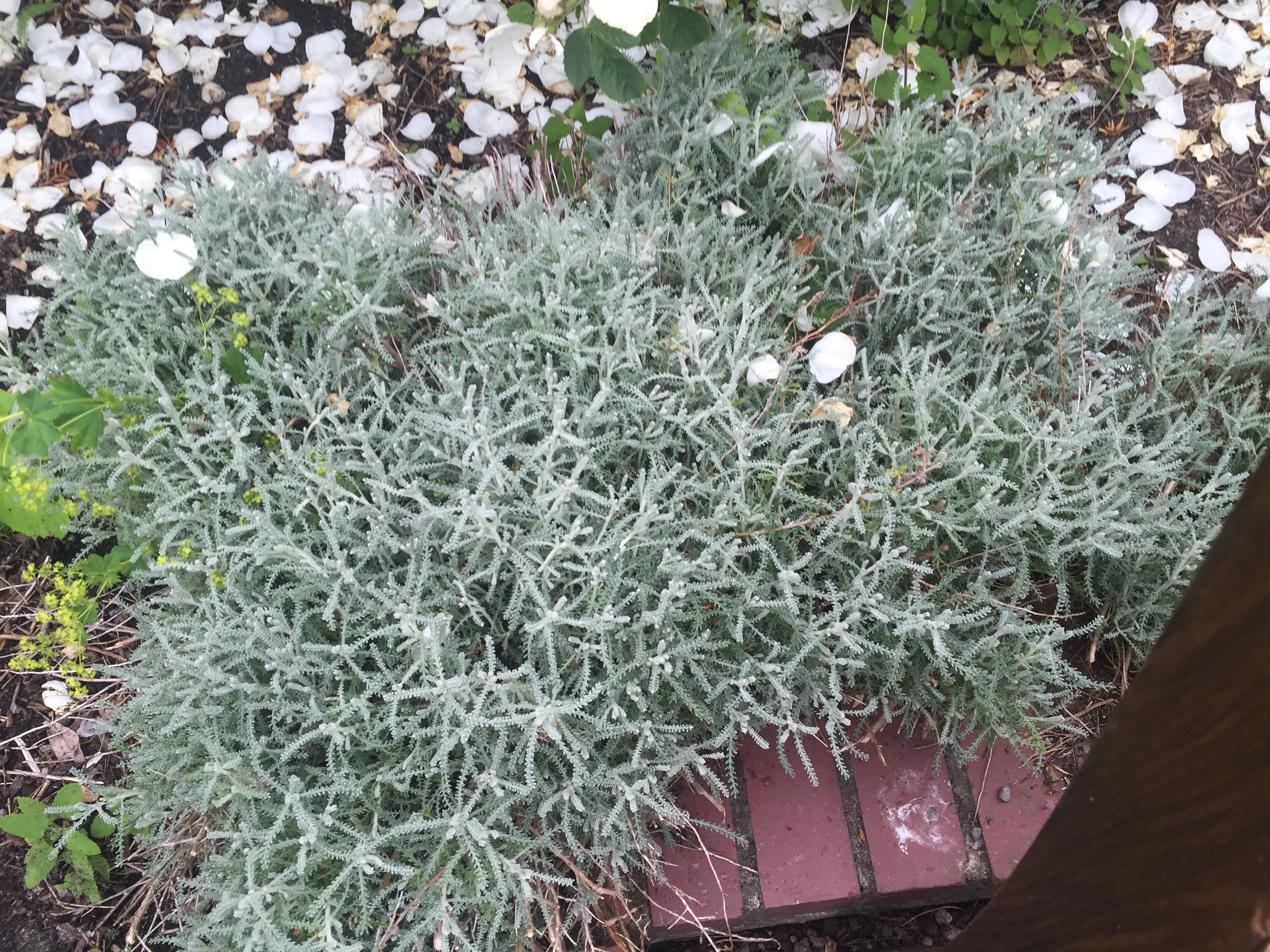
In the UBC Botanical Garden
