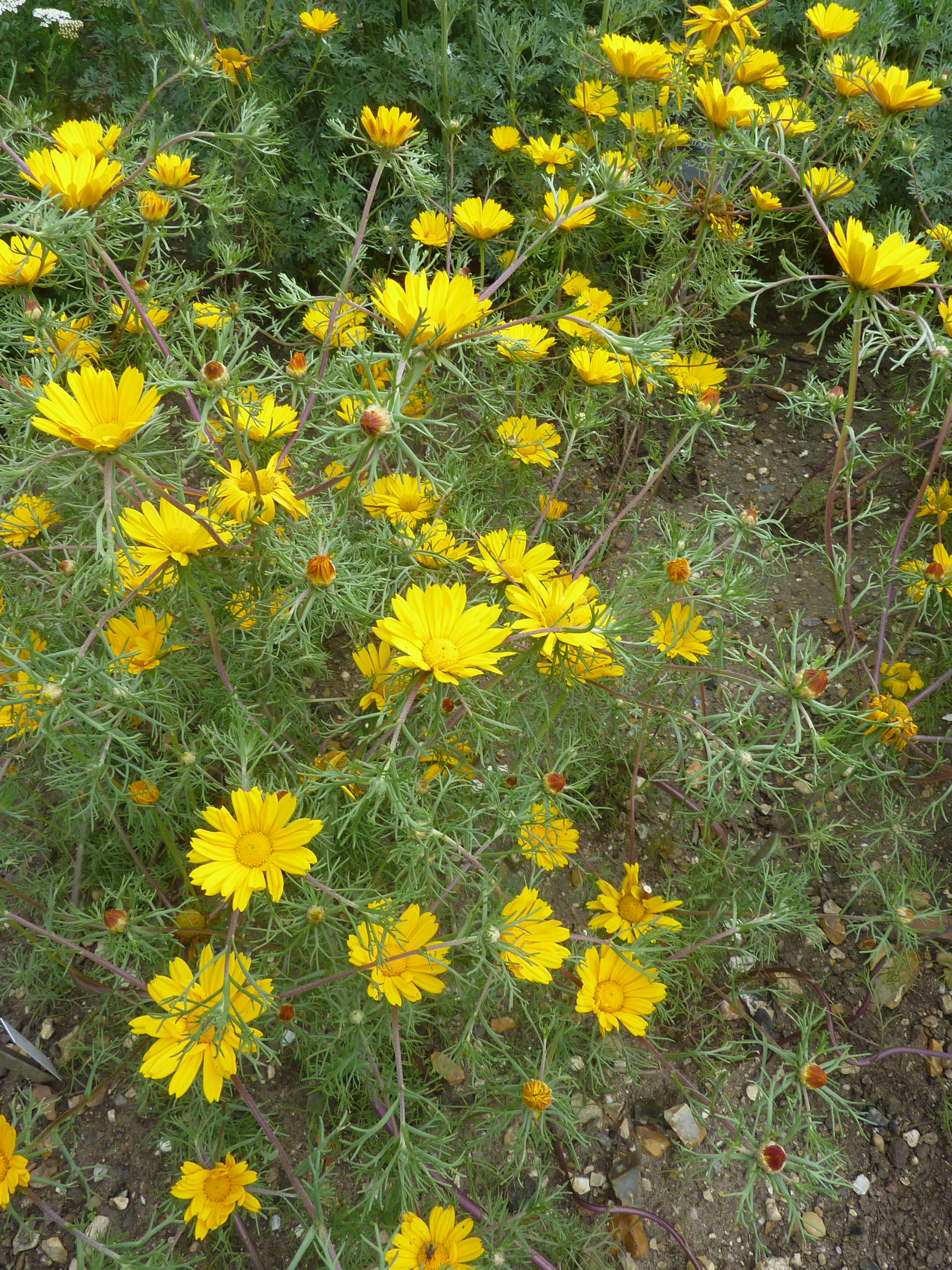
- Cladanthus arabicus

Scientific classification
- Kingdom: Plantae
- Clade: Embryophytes
- Clade: Tracheophytes
- Clade: Spermatophytes
- Clade: Angiosperms
- Clade: Eudicots
- Clade: Asterids
- Order: Asterales
- Family: Asteraceae
- Subfamily: Asteroideae
- Tribe: Anthemideae
- Genus: Cladanthus; Cass.

Type species
- Cladanthus arabicus (L.) Cass.

Species
- See text

= Cladanthus =

Genus of flowering plants

Cladanthus is a genus of plants in the sunflower family, native to the Mediterranean region.

Species

- Cladanthus arabicus (L.) Cass. -SoutheasternSpain, Western Sahara, Morocco, Algeria, Libya, Tunisia, Malta, Sicily
- Cladanthus eriolepis (Coss. ex Maire) Oberpr. & Vogt- Morocco
- Cladanthus flahaultii (Emb.) Oberpr. & Vogt- Morocco
- Cladanthus mixtus (L.) Chevall. - Portugal, Spain, Italy, Albania, Greece, France, Channel Islands (UK), Malta, Algeria, Morocco, Egypt, Libya, Tunisia, Azores, Madeira, Canary Islands, Turkey, Syria, Lebanon, Palestine, Israel, Jordan
- Cladanthus scariosus (Ball) Oberpr. & Vogt - Morocco
