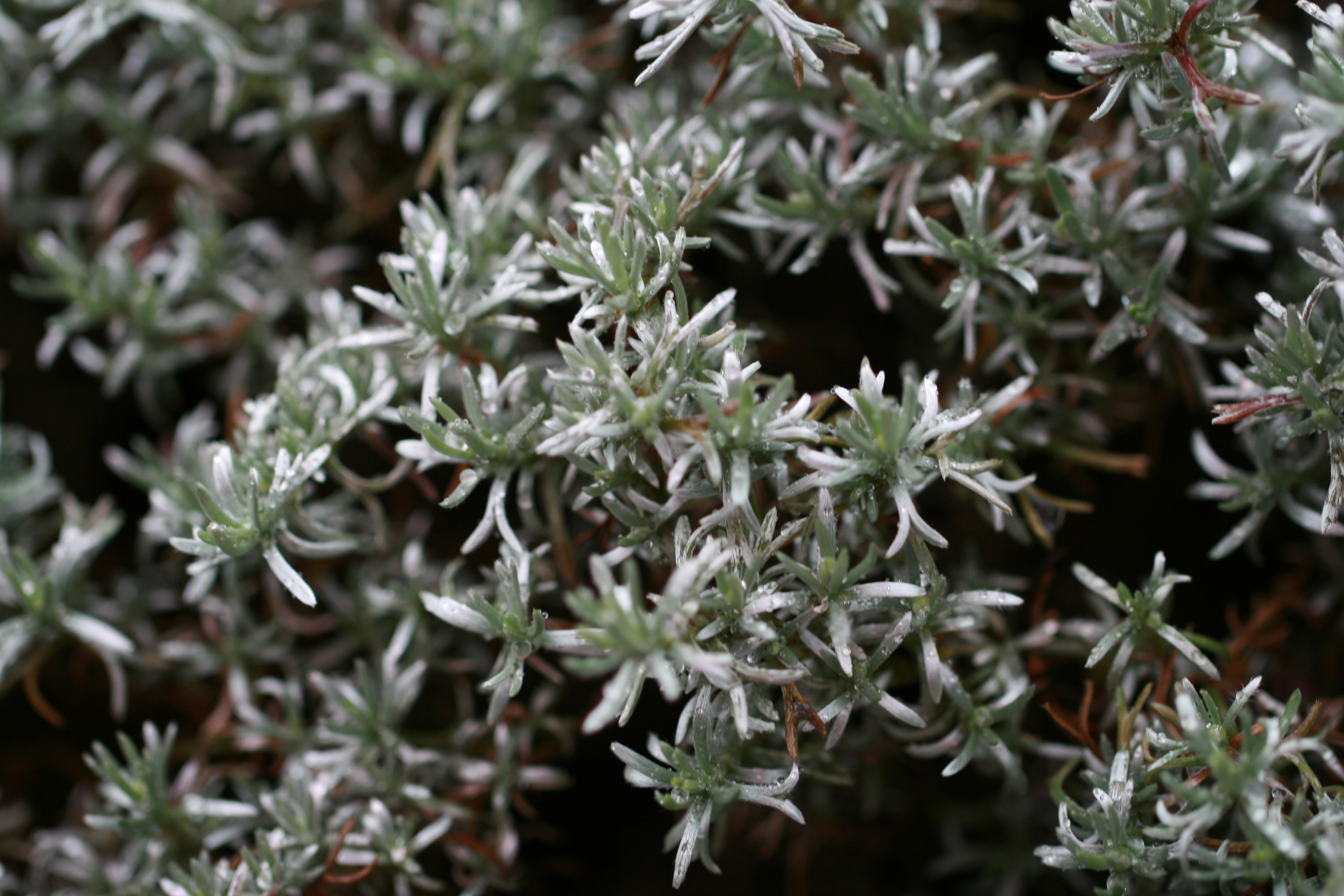

Scientific classification
- Kingdom: Plantae
- Clade: Tracheophytes
- Clade: Angiosperms
- Clade: Eudicots
- Clade: Asterids
- Order: Asterales
- Family: Asteraceae
- Genus: Eumorphia
- Species: E. prostrata

Binomial name
- Eumorphia prostrata Bolus

= Eumorphia prostrata =

Species of flowering plant

Eumorphia prostrata is a plant in the genus Eumorphia found in the eastern mountain regions of southern Africa, at an altitude of 1,900–2,730 metres (6,230–8,960 ft). It is distinguished by the silvery silky hairs that lie flat on its leaves.

== Description ==
Eumorphia prostrata is similar to Eumorphia sericea, but is shorter, flatter, has shorter heads and rays, and a shinier and flattened coverage.
