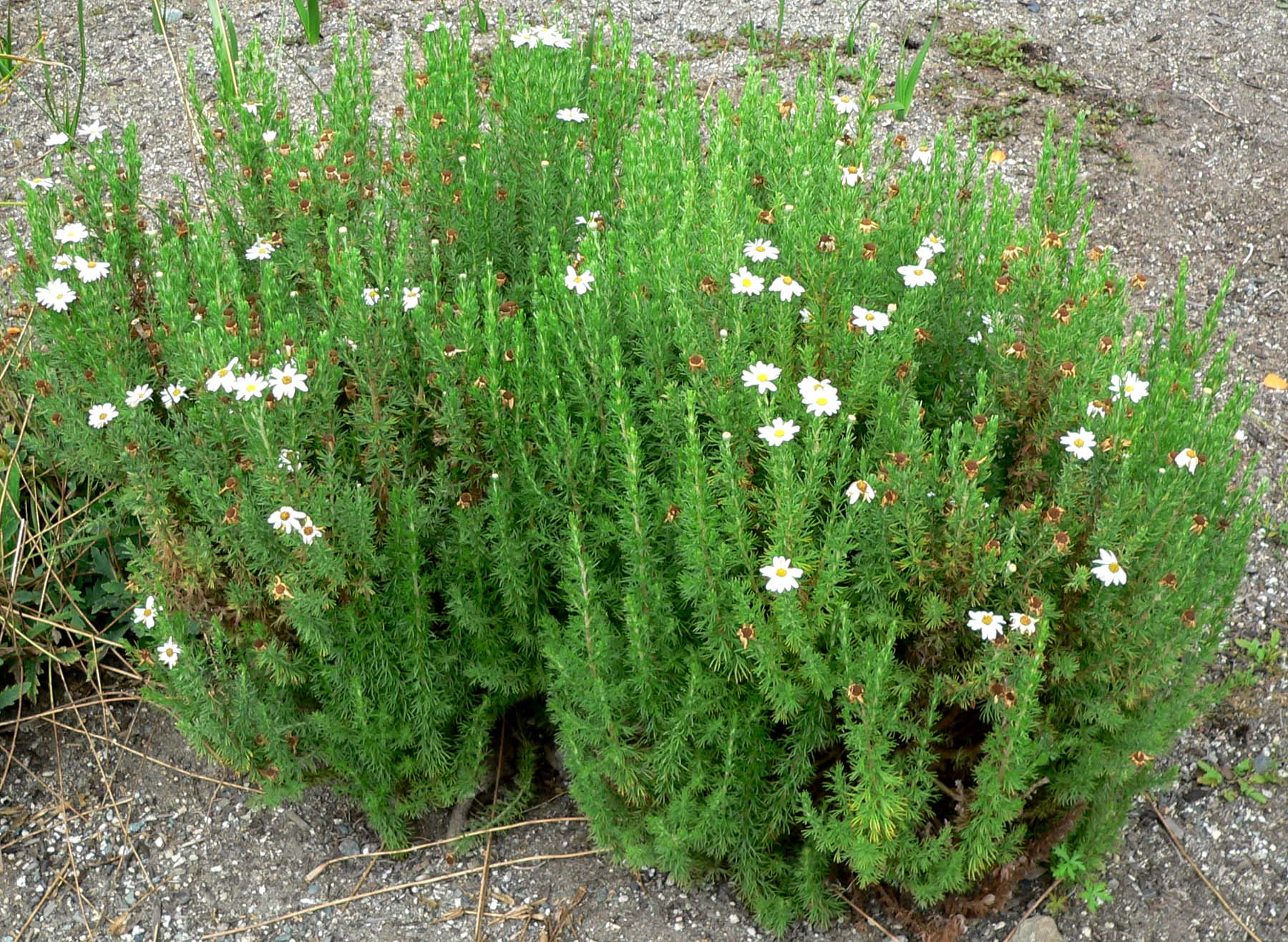
- Eumorphia sericea subsp. robustior

Scientific classification
- Kingdom: Plantae
- Clade: Tracheophytes
- Clade: Angiosperms
- Clade: Eudicots
- Clade: Asterids
- Order: Asterales
- Family: Asteraceae
- Subfamily: Asteroideae
- Tribe: Anthemideae
- Genus: Eumorphia; DC.

Type species
- Eumorphia dregeana DC.

= Eumorphia =

Genus of flowering plants

Eumorphia is a genus of African flowering plants in the daisy family. It has white flowers.

Species

- Eumorphia corymbosa E.Phillips - Cape Provinces
- Eumorphia davyi Bolus - Mpumalanga, Limpopo
- Eumorphia dregeana DC. - Cape Provinces, Free State
- Eumorphia prostrata Bolus - Cape Provinces, Lesotho, KwaZulu-Natal
- Eumorphia sericea J.M.Wood & M.S.Evans - Cape Provinces, Free State, Lesotho, KwaZulu-Natal
- Eumorphia swaziensis Compton - Eswatini, Mpumalanga, Limpopo
