= Tzvelevopyrethrum walteri =

Scientific classification
- Kingdom: Plantae
- Clade: Tracheophytes
- Clade: Angiosperms
- Clade: Eudicots
- Clade: Asterids
- Order: Asterales
- Family: Asteraceae
- Genus: Tzvelevopyrethrum
- Species: T. walteri

Binomial name
- Tzvelevopyrethrum walteri (C.Winkl.) Kamelin

Synonyms
- Chrysanthemum walteri C.Winkl.; Tanacetum walteri (C.Winkl.) Tzvelev

Species of flowering plant

Tzvelevopyrethrum walteri is a species of flowering plant in the family Asteraceae. It is native to two countries, Iran and Turkmenistan.
