= Tzvelevopyrethrum =

Scientific classification
- Kingdom: Plantae
- Clade: Tracheophytes
- Clade: Angiosperms
- Clade: Eudicots
- Clade: Asterids
- Order: Asterales
- Family: Asteraceae
- Subfamily: Asteroideae
- Tribe: Anthemideae
- Genus: Tzvelevopyrethrum; Kamelin

Genus of flowering plants

Tzvelevopyrethrum is a genus of flowering plants belonging to the family Asteraceae.

It is native to Iran and Turkmenistan.

== Known species ==
According to Kew:

- Tzvelevopyrethrum khorassanicum (Krasch.) Kamelin
- Tzvelevopyrethrum turcomanicum (Krasch.) Kamelin
- Tzvelevopyrethrum walteri (C.Winkl.) Kamelin

The genus name of Tzvelevopyrethrum is in honour of Nikolai Tzvelev (1925–2015), a Russian botanist and specialist in grasses and ferns. It was first described and published in Opred. Rast. Sred. Azii Vol.10 on page 635 in 1993.
