= Mount Kinangop =

Hill in Kenya

Kinangop Mountain
- Location within Kenya

Highest point
- Elevation: 3,906 m (12,815 ft)
- Prominence: 530 m (1,740 ft)
- Coordinates: 0°37′40″S 36°42′30″E

Geography
- Location: Kenya
- Parent range: Aberdare Range

Mount Kinangop (or Ilkinangop) is a mountain in the southern Aberdare Range about 160 kilometres (99 mi) north of Nairobi, Kenya. It is within the Aberdare National Park.

A dormant volcano, Kinangop overlooks the Kinangop Plateau to the west and the Great Rift Valley beyond. Kinangop is the second-highest peak in the Aberdares after Mount Satima. The lower levels of the mountain have extensive bamboo forests. Higher up it is covered by tussock grasses. The main peak is a rocky outcrop surrounded by open moorlands. Due to the altitude, temperatures are cool and may drop below freezing at night.

== Sources ==
- "Aberdares South to North (Njabini to Mutubio)". Mountain Club of Kenya. November 24, 2011.
- Brewer, Wesley C. (2005). Beyond the Sangres: A Tale of Hope, Pain, And Courage. iUniverse. ISBN 0-595-35068-2.
- Mani, M. S. (1968). Ecology and biogeography of high altitude insects. Springer. ISBN 90-6193-114-2.
- Wielochowski, Andrew (1999). "Aberdare Mountains 3999m". EWP.
