= Nairobi Dam =

- Interactive map of Nairobi Dam
- Country: Kenya
- Location: Nairobi, Nairobi River
- Coordinates: 1.3198°S 36.7954°E
- Purpose: Water storage (though heavily silted and polluted)
- Status: Operational (but severely degraded)
- Opening date: 1953

Dam and spillways
- Type of dam: Embankment dam
- Impounds: Nairobi River

Reservoir
- Creates: Nairobi Dam Reservoir
- Total capacity: 98,000 m3 (79 acre⋅ft)
- Catchment area: Motoine River, rainfall, wastewater from Kibera
- Surface area: 350,000 m2 (86 acres)
- Maximum water depth: 2.76 m (9.1 ft) (average)

The Nairobi Dam is an embankment dam on the Nairobi River in Nairobi, Kenya.

== Background ==
The Dam constructed in 1953 holds back a reservoir with storage capacity of 98,000 m^{3} (79 acre⋅ft) and surface area of 350,000 m^{2} (86 acres). It is a shallow lake with an average depth on only 2.76 m (9.1 ft)

Inflow is from the Motoine River, from rainfall, and waste water from the unsewered Kibera settlement. Outflow is through evaporation and over the spillway into the Ngong River.

The Dam is heavily silted and areas have been reclaimed for agriculture by dumping solid waste.

The water hyacinth plant is very common and has clogged the water preventing sailing and fishing.

== Geology ==
The sediment beneath the Dam consists of Middle and Upper Kerichwa Valley Tuffs.

== Regeneration projects ==
Prime Minister Raila Odinga announced plans to regenerate the Dam and when he met with the Nairobi Dam Trust Initiative on 14 September 2011.

He asked that it be made part of the Nairobi River Basin Project funded by the United Nations Environment Program with the tasks of removing the water hyacinth and solid waste to restore the aquatic ecosystem. Also associated encroachment would need the settlements to be pulled down (Kibera is the second biggest slum in Africa, with 700,000 inhabitants) with an estimated cost of KSh.700 million/= (US$7.3 million)
