= Nairobi River Drainage Channel =

Urban drainage corridor in Kenya

Location
- Country: Kenya
- County: Nairobi County

Physical characteristics
- Source: Nairobi River Basin
- Mouth: Athi River system

Basin features
- Progression: Nairobi River Drainage Channel → Nairobi River → Athi River
- River system: Nairobi River Basin
- Cities: Nairobi
- Tributaries
  - left: Ngong River
  - right: Mathare River
- Purpose: Urban stormwater conveyance and flood management

The Nairobi River Drainage Channel is an urban drainage corridor associated with the Nairobi River Basin in Nairobi County, Kenya. It forms part of the wider drainage and flood-management infrastructure of the Nairobi metropolitan area.

== Geography ==
The drainage corridor is associated with the Nairobi River Basin, which includes the Nairobi, Ngong and Mathare rivers and their tributaries. The basin extends across multiple counties and drains into the Athi River system.

== Urban drainage role ==
The Nairobi River corridor functions as a major component of Nairobi's stormwater management network. Rapid urbanisation, encroachment on riparian areas, pollution and solid waste accumulation have reduced drainage capacity and increased flood risks within the basin.

== Nairobi Rivers Basin Regeneration Programme ==
The Nairobi Rivers Basin Regeneration Programme (NaBREP) is a multi-agency initiative coordinated by the Nairobi Rivers Commission to restore and manage the basin's rivers and associated infrastructure. The programme includes river training works, bank stabilisation, drainage improvements and hydrological interventions.

== Governance ==
The Nairobi Rivers Commission was established in 2022 to coordinate the rehabilitation, protection and restoration of the Nairobi River Basin and its associated infrastructure.

== See also ==
- Nairobi River
- Athi River
