= Helichrysum gloria-dei =

Conservation status
- Least Concern (IUCN 3.1)

Scientific classification
- Kingdom: Plantae
- Clade: Tracheophytes
- Clade: Angiosperms
- Clade: Eudicots
- Clade: Asterids
- Order: Asterales
- Family: Asteraceae
- Genus: Helichrysum
- Species: H. gloria-dei

Binomial name
- Helichrysum gloria-dei Chiov.

Species of plant endemic to Kenya

Helichrysum gloria-dei is a species of Helichrysum endemic to the southern Aberdare Mountain Range in central Kenya.

== Distribution and habitat ==
Helichrysum gloria-dei is an alpine species known only from the southern Aberdare Mountain Range in central Kenya. It grows in rocky areas on Kinangop Peak, Elephant Hill, and in the surrounding moorlands within Aberdare National Park at elevations of 3,650–4,000 m (11,980–13,120 ft) above sea level. It has been recorded growing in association with Alchemilla, Carex, and Erica species.

== Description ==
Helichrysum gloria-dei is a sparsely branched perennial shrub with thick, woody branches. The leaves, each measuring 1–4 cm (0.39–1.57 in) long and 2.5–5 mm (0.098–0.197 in) wide, are linear or narrowly lanceolate in shape and sessile, lacking petioles. The leaves are tomentose, covered with a thick layer of white hairs, with downcurved margins and a bluntly or sharply pointed tip. Live leaves are densely clustered towards the tips of the branches, with dead leaves or leaf bases sheathing older growth. The flowers are white or cream capitula measuring 20–30 mm (0.79–1.18 in) long.

== Conservation status ==
Helichrysum gloria-dei is listed as least concern on the International Union for the Conservation of Nature's Red List on the basis that the population is not currently declining and that, though endemic to a small area, the species' entire range is located within a protected area, Aberdare National Park. The population at Elephant Peak is accessible to tourists and may be threatened by littering or flower-picking, however, the population at Kinangop Peak is more remote. Declines in population or habitat quality have not yet been observed, but increases in tourism or wildfires could pose a threat in future and further monitoring is required.
