= Nairobi River =

River in Nairobi, Kenya

Coordinates: 1°11′59″S 37°09′26″E

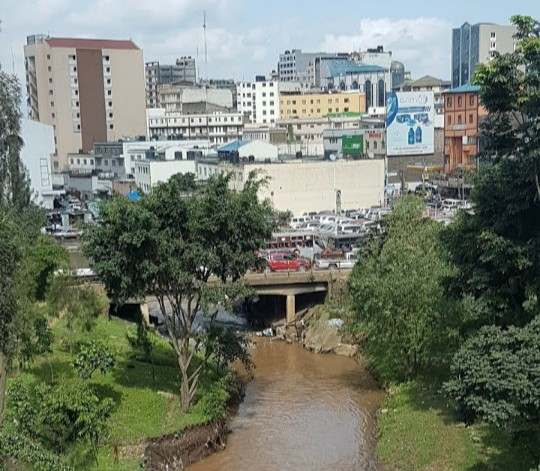
- Nairobi river at the CBD

- Location of mouth

Location
- Country: Kenya

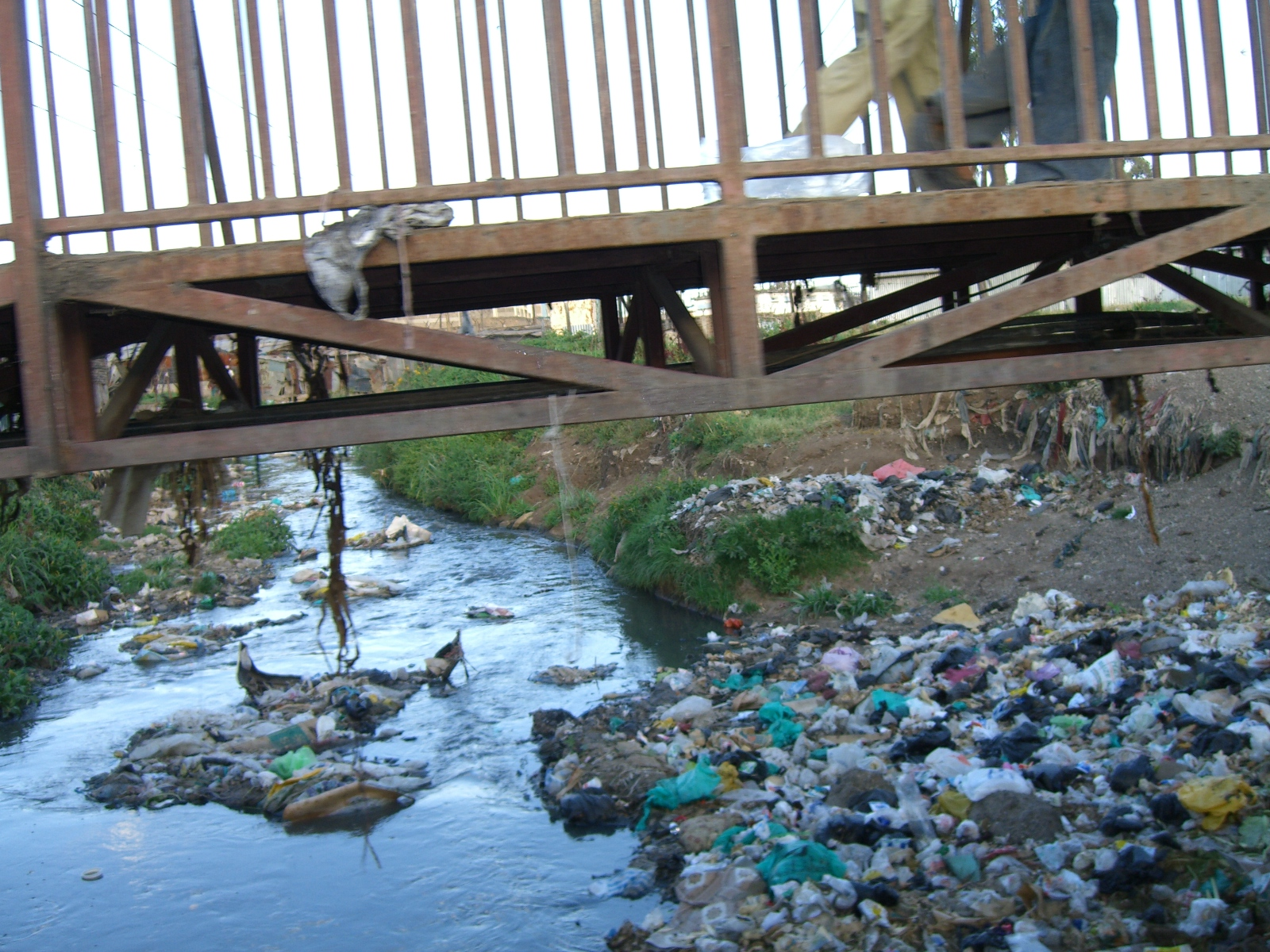
Pollution in the Nairobi River.

The Nairobi River is a river that flows across Nairobi, the capital city of Kenya. It is the main river of the Nairobi River Basin, with several parallel streams flowing eastward. All of the Nairobi basin rivers join east of Nairobi and meet the Athi River, which eventually flows into the Indian Ocean. The rivers are mostly narrow and highly polluted, though recent efforts to clean the rivers have improved water quality.

The main stream, the Nairobi River, bounds the northern city center, where it is partly canalized.

== Tributaries ==
The Nairobi River originates from the Ondiri Swamp in Kikuyu. The Nairobi River has several tributaries:

- Athi River
- Gathara-ini River
- Gitathuru River
- Kiu River
- Mathari River
- Mbagathi River
- Nairobi River
- Ngong River
- RuiRuaka River

The Motoine River flows to Nairobi Dam, an artificial lake meant to provide potable water to the residents of Nairobi. The stream continues as the Ngong River.

Gatharaini stream originates in the marshes of the lower reaches of the Aberdare mountains and flows through various populated areas. The stream is impacted by human activities along its channels and in its catchment. In the upper sections of Kiambaa and Kanunga, the stream passes through swampy and marshy areas, with subsistence agriculture and human settlement as the main types of land use. In the midsections of Kiambu, are extensive coffee crops and mixed farming.

In Eastern Nairobi it passes through Nairobi Sewerage Company in Ngundu, Kamulu.

In the lower sections of Githurai and Zimmerman, the stream is characterized by coffee farming, intensive mixed farming, and industry such as the Kamiti Tannery Factory. The lower stream waters are brackish and foul. In the past, riverine subsistence agriculture of arrowroots and kale was common throughout the area. Efforts to conserve and preserve this river are yet to be initiated.

Nairobi's rivers are contaminated due to agriculture, slums, and industry. During rainy seasons, rivers on the low-lying riverbanks flood.

Kenya has a second river named Nairobi that starts on Mount Kenya and is a tributary of the Sagana and Tana, the country's longest river.

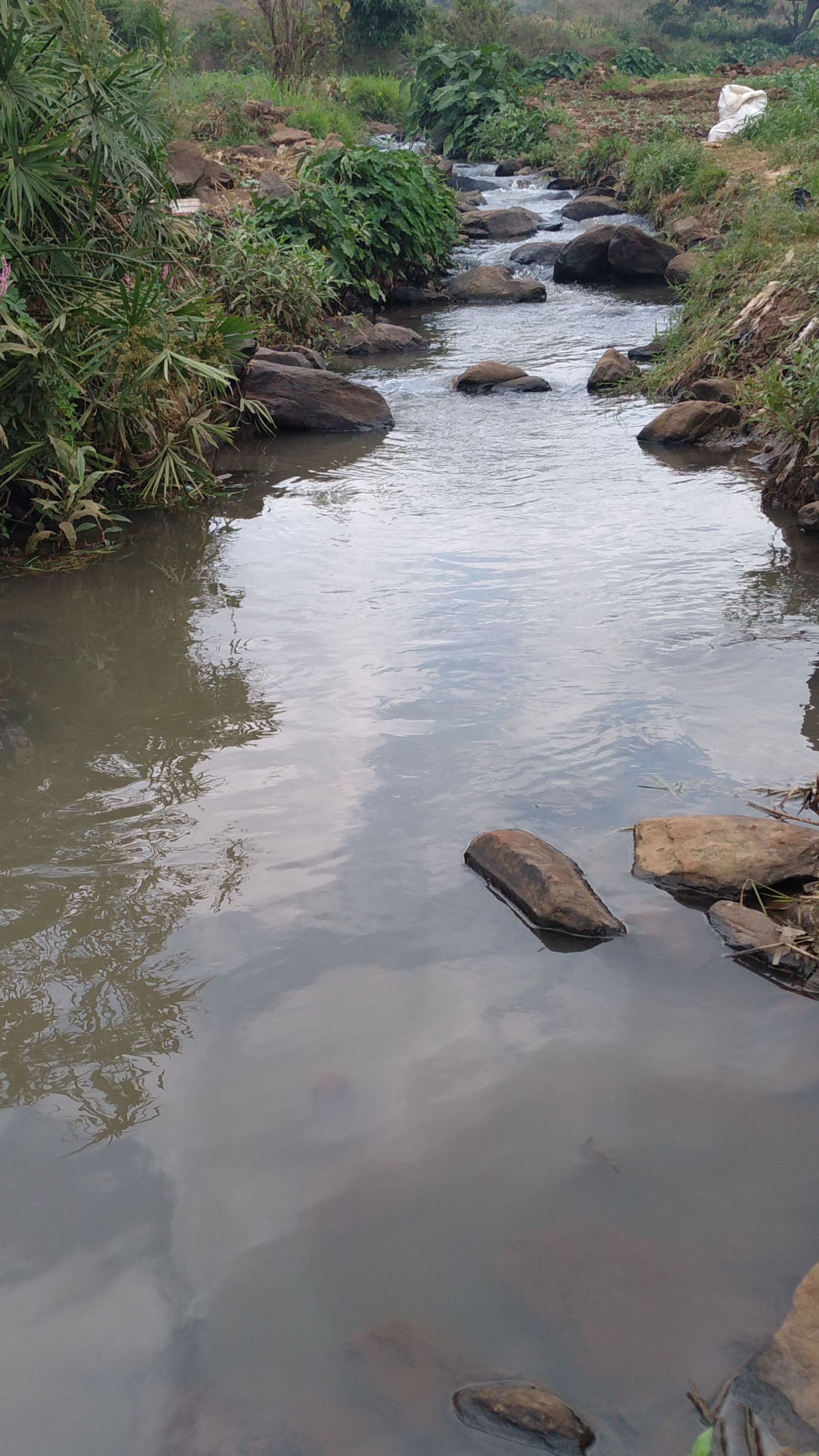
Gathara-ini river is in Kasarani constituency; Nairobi county.

== See also ==
- Water supply and sanitation in Kenya
