= Aberdare Range =

Mountain range in Kenya

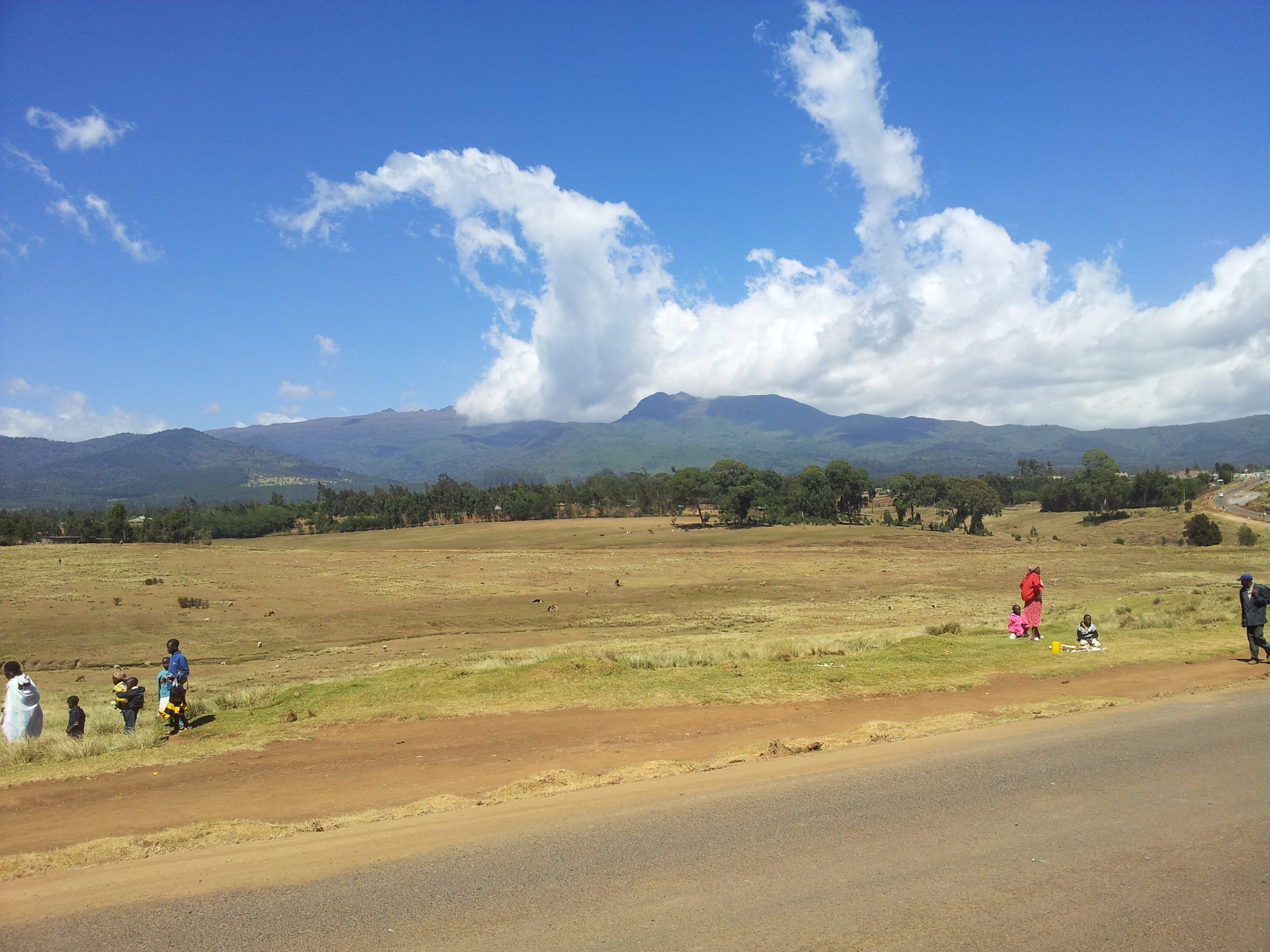
- Skyline of Aberdare Range

Highest point
- Peak: Mount Satima
- Elevation: 4,001 m (13,127 ft)
- Coordinates: 0°37′40″S 36°42′30″E

Geography
- Location within Kenya
- Country: Kenya

The Aberdare Range (formerly the Sattima Range, Kikuyu: Nyandarua) is a 160 km (99 mi) long mountain range of upland, north of Kenya's capital Nairobi with an average elevation of 3,500 metres (11,480 ft). It straddles the counties of Nyandarua, Nyeri, Murang'a, Kiambu and Laikipia. The mountain range is in west central Kenya, northeast of Naivasha and Gilgil and lies just south of the Equator. The mountain range is called Nyandarua among the Agikuyu people in whose territory this forest and mountain range is located. The name Nyandarua comes from the Kikuyu word rwandarua meaning a drying hide, due to the distinctive fold of its silhouette.

== Topography ==
The Aberdare Range forms a section of the eastern rim of the Great Rift Valley running roughly north to south. On the west, the range falls off steeply into the Kinangop Plateau and then into the Great Rift Valley. On the east, the range slopes more gently. Lake Naivasha and the distant Mau Escarpment can be seen from peaks in the range.

The range has a maximum elevation of 3,999 metres (13,120 ft) and is heavily forested. The former name of the range survives in Mount Satima ("the mountain of the young bull"), the highest peak in the Aberdare Range. The second-highest peak, at the southern end of the range, is Mount Kinangop at 3,906 metres (12,815 ft). Mount Kenya at 5,199 metres (17,057 ft) is the second highest mountain in Africa after Kilimanjaro and lies east of the Aberdare Range.

The Aberdares are the water catchment area for the Sasumua dam and the Ndakaini dam, which provide most of the water for Nairobi. The mountain forests are catchment areas for the Tana River, the largest river in Kenya, supplying water to the Seven Forks hydroelectric power complex which generates over 55 percent of Kenya's total electricity output.

== Ecology ==
The main ecosystems within the mountain range are rainforests giving way to dense bamboo forests and then moorland. The steep western edges of the hillside are sparsely inhabited by wildlife compared to the forested gentle slopes to the east, which are home to a wide variety of wildlife. There are multitudes of elephants, buffalos, giant forest hogs, hyenas as well as the endangered black rhinos and bongos. A variety of cats including leopards, servals, civet, genet and the rare African golden cat. Other threatened species including the Jackson mongoose, the black and white colobus monkey and Sykes' monkey are plentiful, as are waterbuck, reedbuck, duikers, and bushbuck. The Aberdare Range is also home to the endemic Aberdare cisticola.

The Aberdares contain a rich diversity of vegetation. There are 778 vegetation and plant species, subspecies and varieties found in the Aberdare National Park, due to the park's altitude and rainfall. Hardwood trees include camphor, cedar, podo and hagenia.

Much of the range has been protected within the Aberdare National Park since its creation in 1950. The range attracts large numbers of hikers and climbers operating out of the main centers of Naivasha and Gilgil. The lower slopes are farmed, higher areas are known for their wildlife. The Rhino Charge is an annual event run by conservationists in Kenya to pay for fencing of the Aberdare National Park as a means of protecting East Africa's largest indigenous forest from destruction.

== Aberdare Range Forest ==
Aberdare Ranges Forest are the host for the Aberdare Forest Reserve, which along with the Kikuyu Escarpments runs 120 km (75 mi) northwards from Nairobi and about 40 km (25 mi) at its widest point. With a perimeter of 566 km (352 mi), the Aberdare Range varies in altitude from 2,000 metres (6,600 ft) on the forest boundary on the eastside and 4,001 metres (13,127 ft) towards the northern edge at the peak of Oldonyo Lesatima. The Range descend gradually from the peak towards Nyahururu from the northern side, where incised river valleys and volcanic vents are evident. On the southern side, the range is steep southwards from IL Kinangop peak towards the northern part of Murang’a North District.

== Rivers ==
The major rivers from the Aberdare Forest are the Athi and the Tana, which flow into the Indian Ocean, the Ewaso Nyiro that drains into the Lorian Swamp and the River Malewa that drains into Lake Naivasha. The Aberdares also have several tributaries, and higher up are bog markings that are the source of the rivers on the moorlands and afro-alpine. The Athi, Lake Naivasha, Tana and Ewaso Nyiro river basins have their source in the Aberdare Forest Reserve.

== Ecosystems ==
The mountains have four vegetation zones, including subalpine vegetation, xeromorphic evergreen forest, montane humid forest, and submontane forest. Plants endemic to the range include Alchemilla hagenia, Coelachne friesiorum, Dendrosenecio brassiciformis, Helichrysum gloria-dei, and Heracleum taylorii.

=== Sub alpine vegetation ===
Found at elevations above 3,300 metres (10,800 feet) is the moorlands. Alpine grass (Deschampsia), distinguished by giant groundsell (Dendrosenecio johnstonii), Lobelia deckenii, and heath (Erica mannii). Moorland communities are the main vegetation in this region. Shrub communities consisting of Erica arborea and Hebenstretia angolensis are found between 3,000 and 3,300 metres (9,800 and 10,800 ft), while a belt of bamboo is common between 2,400 and 3,300 m (7,900 and 10,800 ft), and cover about 35,000 ha (135 square miles).

=== Montane humid forest ===
This belt is mostly dominated by pioneer species Macaranga capensis and Neoboutonia macrocalyx and runs to the east side of the range. The region is also host to the valuable commercial species including Aningeria adolfi-friederici, Kuloa usambarensis, and Syzygium guineense, which are the most conspicuous forest in the Kikuyu escarpment.

=== Xeromorphic evergreen forest ===
Located on the dry northern and western slopes of Aberdares, it has several species with the most notable being the olives (Olea europaea, Olea capensis, Olea hochstetteri), podo (Podocarpus milanjianus), and cedar (Juniperus procera).

=== Sub-montane forest ===
This forms the seasonal forest cover on the north-east slopes with predominantly Ekebergia capensis, Nuxia congesta, Cassipourea malosana, and Calodendrum capense (Cape chestnut) species.

== Events ==
The Aberdare Range was named by Joseph Thomson in 1884 in honour of Lord Aberdare, who at the time was president of the Royal Geographical Society and the Royal Historical Society. Aberdare was also a Liberal politician who had served as Home Secretary from 1868 to 1873. He was later to become the first chancellor of the University of Wales.

The area is well known as the headquarters of Dedan Kimathi, leader of the 1950s Mau Mau Uprising. Elizabeth II became Queen of the United Kingdom while staying at Treetops Hotel in the Aberdares.

It was also the site where J.A. Hunter killed the rogue elephant of Aberdare Forest.
