= Rhino Charge =

Off-road competition in Kenya

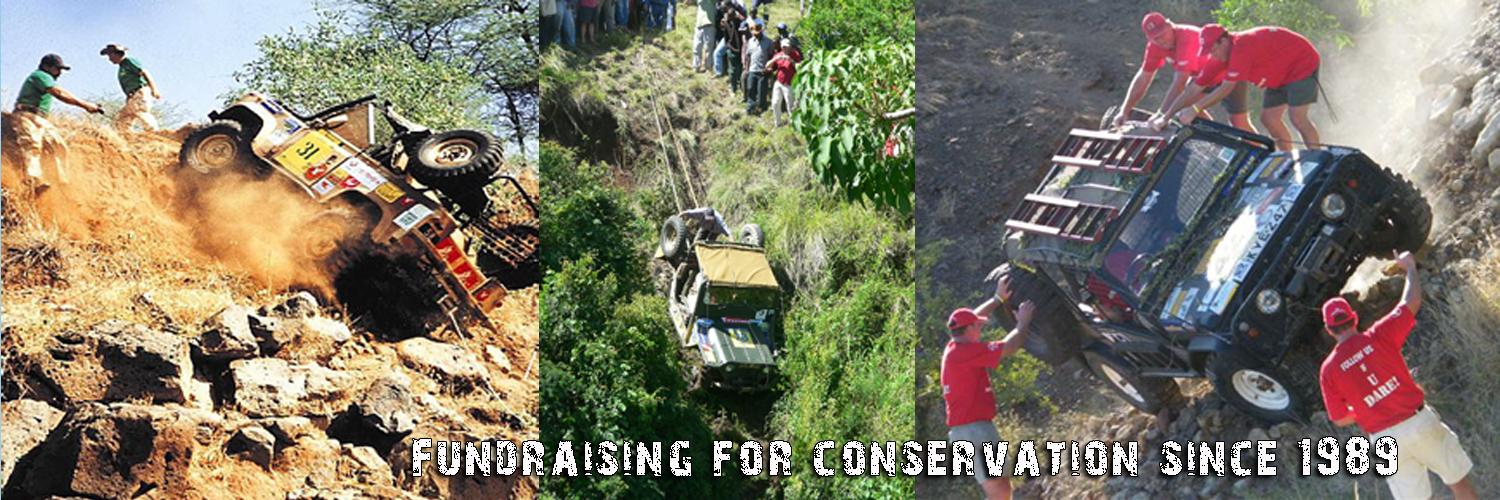
Rhino Charge - Fundraising for Conservation

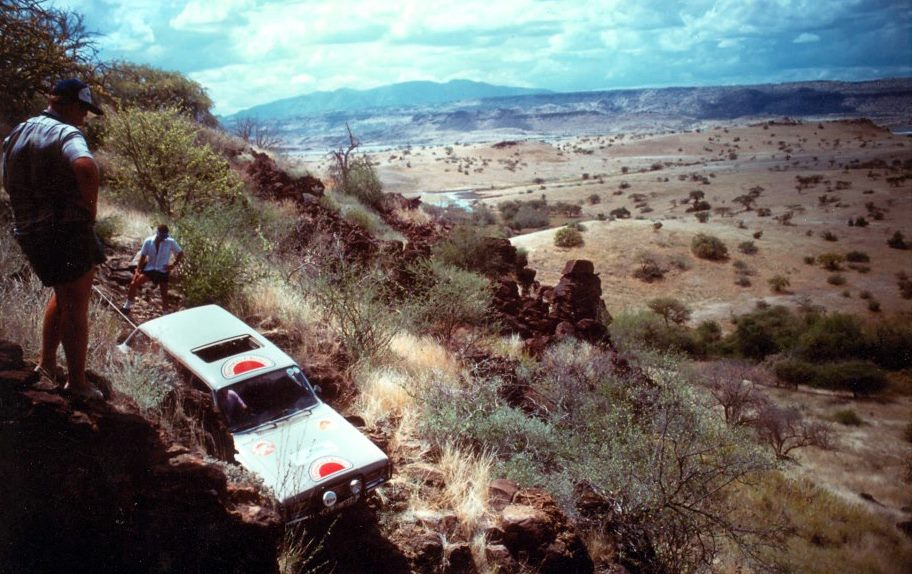
Rhino Charge 1990

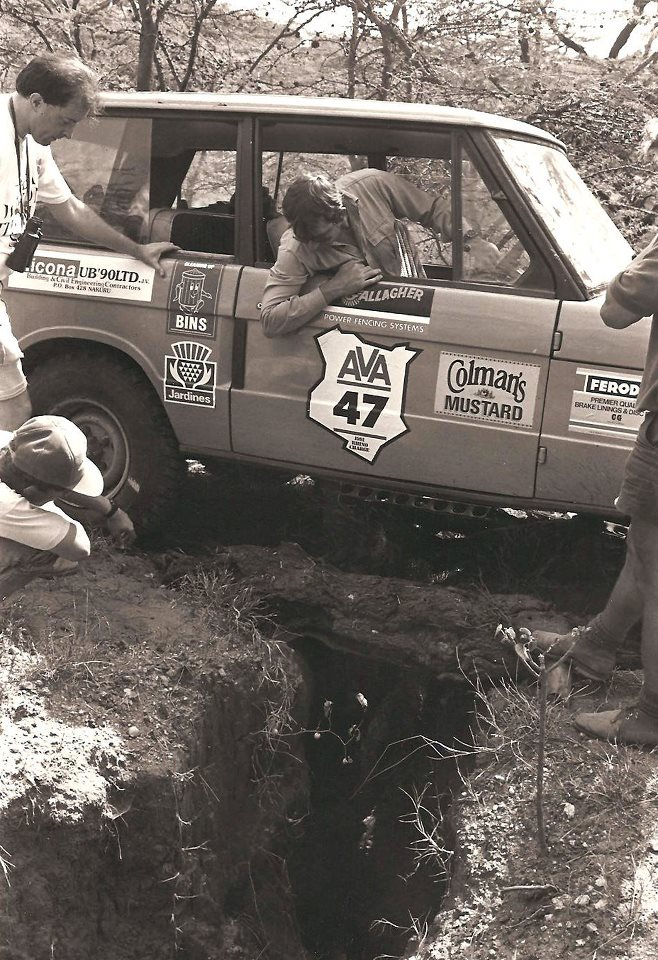
Rhino Charge 1991

The Rhino Charge is an annual off-road competition held in Kenya in which entrants are required to visit a number of points (Guard Posts) while travelling the shortest possible distance across difficult, trackless terrain, where speed is penalised. The event is organised in order to raise funds to support the activities of the Charitable Trust Rhino Ark.

The event was conceived in 1989 to raise funds for the construction of the Aberdare Electric Fence. Rhino Ark founder Ken Kuhle, Rally Enthusiasts Rob Combes and Brian Haworth mooted the idea of an off-road event to support the fencing project carried out by the recently established Charitable Trust Rhino Ark. The Trust was committed to saving the dwindling Rhino population in the Aberdare National Park, as well as mitigating human-wildlife conflicts around the National Park. On 4 February 1989, 31 competing vehicles entered the first event which was won by Travers Allison in a Suzuki jeep. Whilst the first Rhino Charge raised only KES 250,000, this amount increased tremendously over the years to reach over KES 90 million in the 2013 event.

== History ==
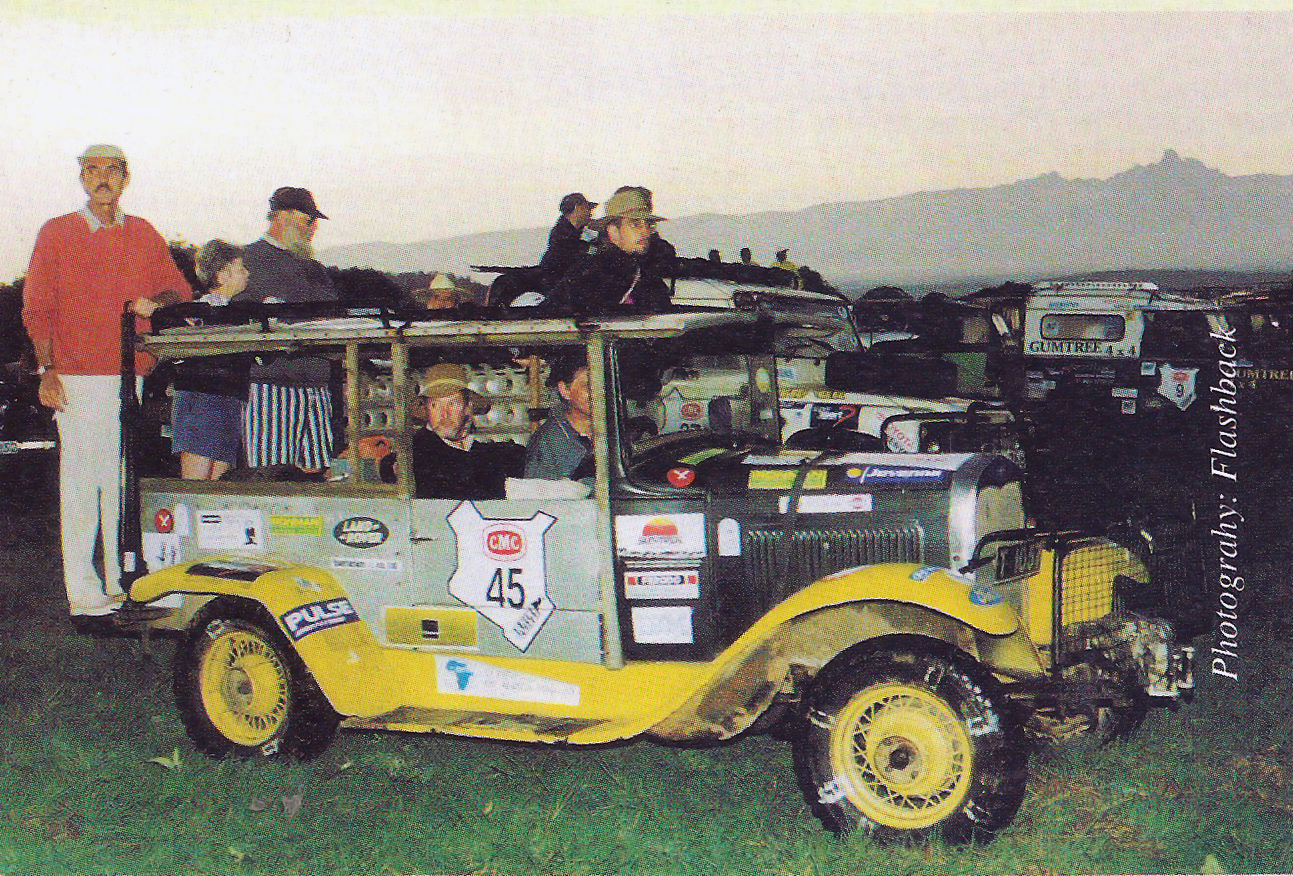
Rhino Charge 1998 Phil Tilley and Crew wait for the start

The Rhino Charge was conceived in Nairobi, Kenya, when Rhino Ark founder Ken Kuhle asked Rally Enthusiast Rob Coombes whether he would organise a motorsport event to help raise funds for the Rhino Ark Kenya Charitable Trust that he had recently formed. The trust was committed to saving the dwindling Rhino population in the Aberdare National Park.

The concept discussed was to hold an offroading competition whereby the winner would drive a vehicle to the highest altitude on Mount Kenya. Rob then discussed the idea with Brian Haworth who agreed to join Rob in organising it. Presentations to Kenya Wildlife Service quickly determined that the permission to hold the event on Mount Kenya would not be granted and the concept went back to the drawing board. Some years prior to this, Brian had scouted a route around Mount Longonot for an off-road event at the request of Derek Gates (Safari Rally organiser). It never took place as they decided to hold a mini event at Hell's Gate National Park instead. Brian's concept was to use distance, rather than speed as the deciding factor, this was to prove the basis for what would become the Rhino Charge.

Based on this experience and after much discussion, Rob and Brian decided to attempt an event to drive over Mount Suswa in the Rift Valley. Two controls would be sited on either side of the Volcano and whoever did it in the shortest distance would be the winner. One Sunday morning in early 1989 the two set off, with motor bikes, headed for the southern slopes of Mount Suswa. They made it halfway up the mountain before returning. They sat looking across the Suswa plains with Lake Magadi in the distance, several small hills and large wadi in the foreground. They had the thought to put a control on the top of each hill and one at the bottom of the escarpment. The following weekend they spent two days driving and riding around the area setting out what eventually became the venue for the first ever Rhino Charge. Thirty-one competing vehicles entered on 4 February 1989. The event was won by Travers Allison in a Suzuki Jeep. Distance was measured with the vehicle's standard odometer.

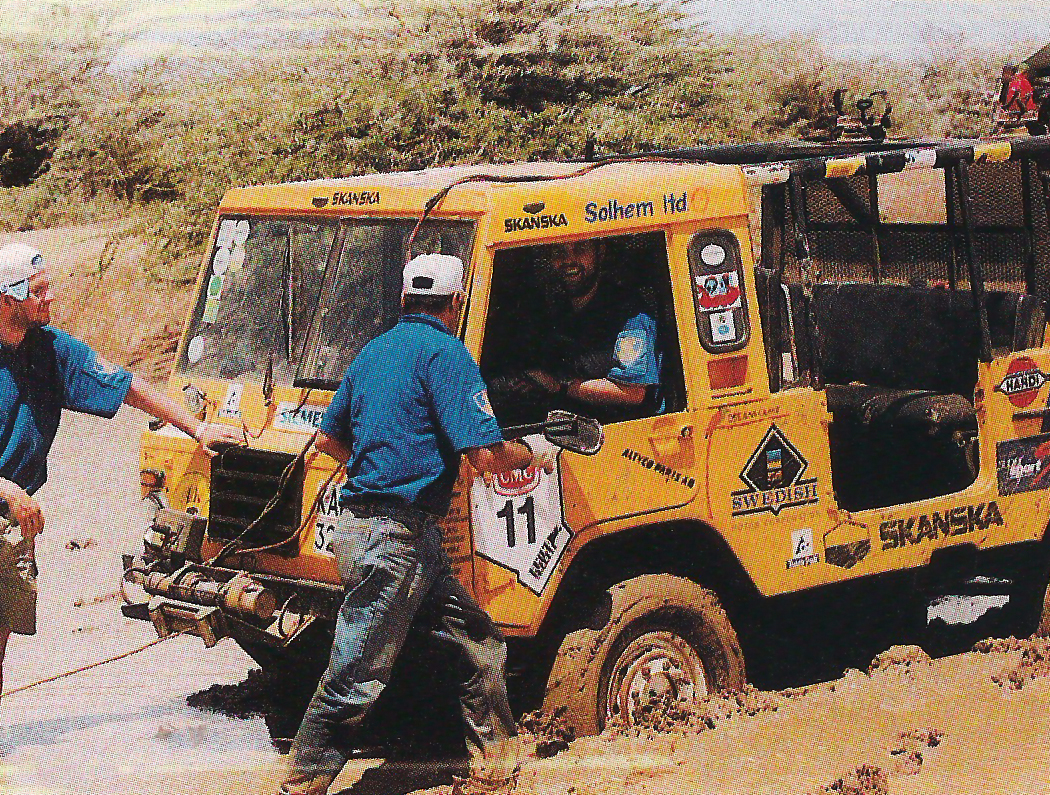
Rhino Charge 1999

== The Competition ==
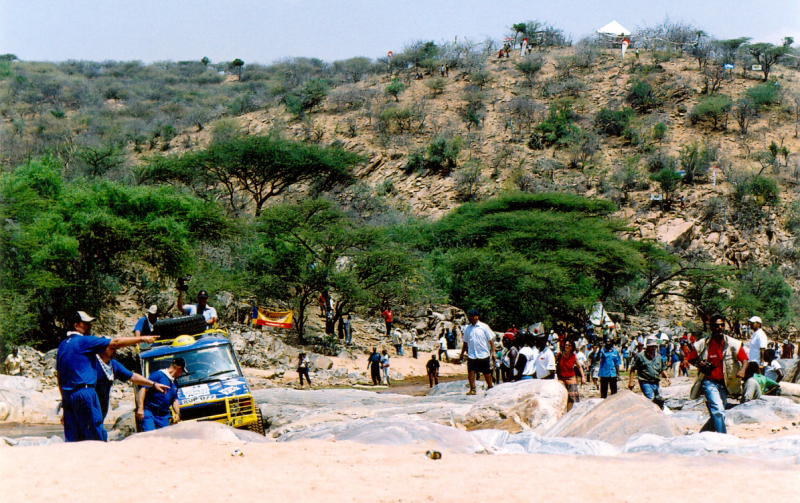
Rhino Charge 2006 spectator numbers are getting bigger every year

The Rhino Charge is a one-day off-road event during which a maximum of 65 competitors are required to visit 13 control points scattered over approximately 100 square kilometres of rough terrain within a 10 hours period. Supplied with a 1:50,000 scale map of the venue and the GPS coordinates of the 13 control points, each competing team decides the route they want to follow. The winner is the competitor who finishes at the control point where he started having visited all the other control points in the shortest distance (GPS measured).

The Charge is a competition that requires a level of skill in off-road driving and navigation. To prevent adverse environmental impacts, entries to the event are limited to 65 vehicles.

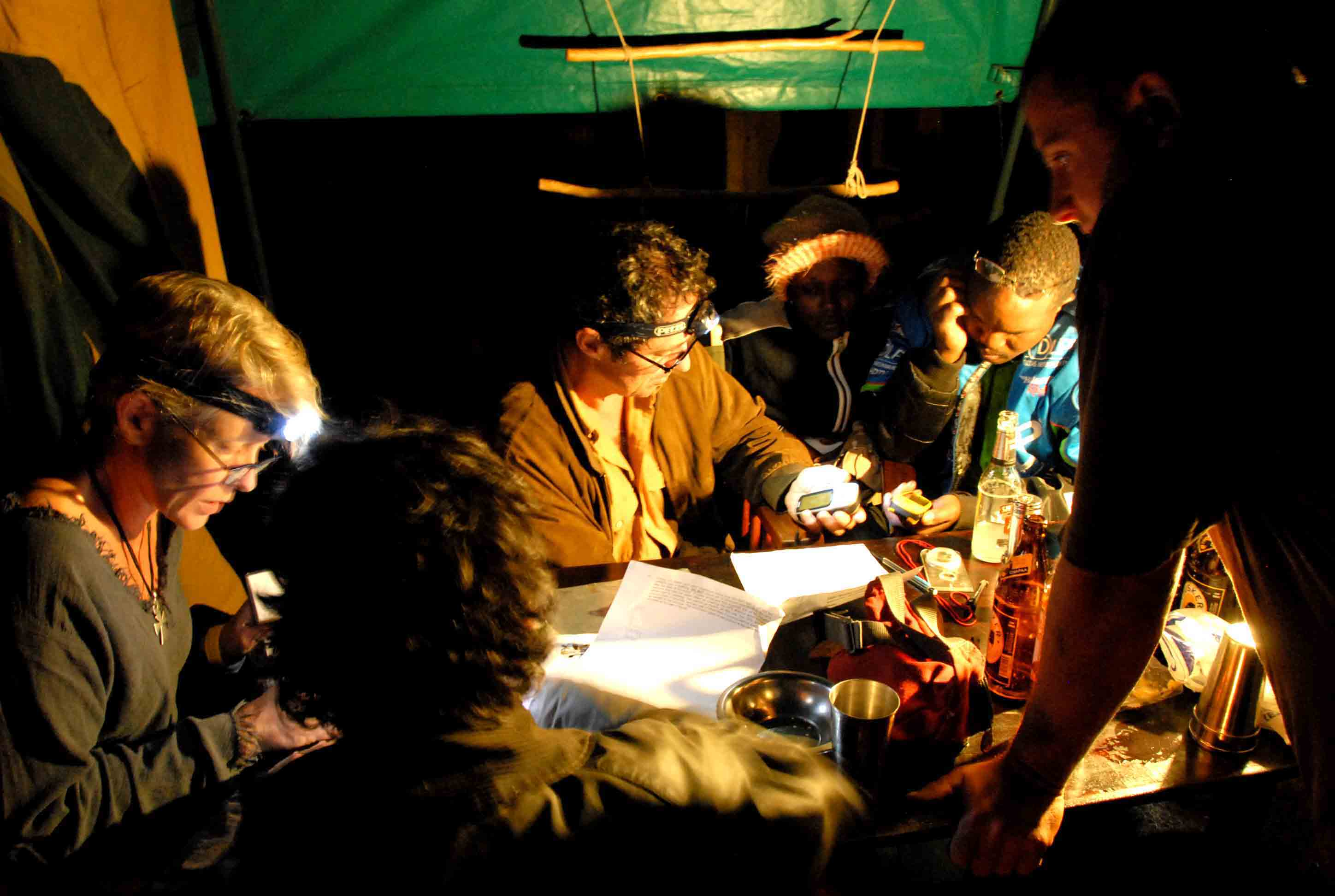
Rhino Charge Pre-Charge Planning 2007

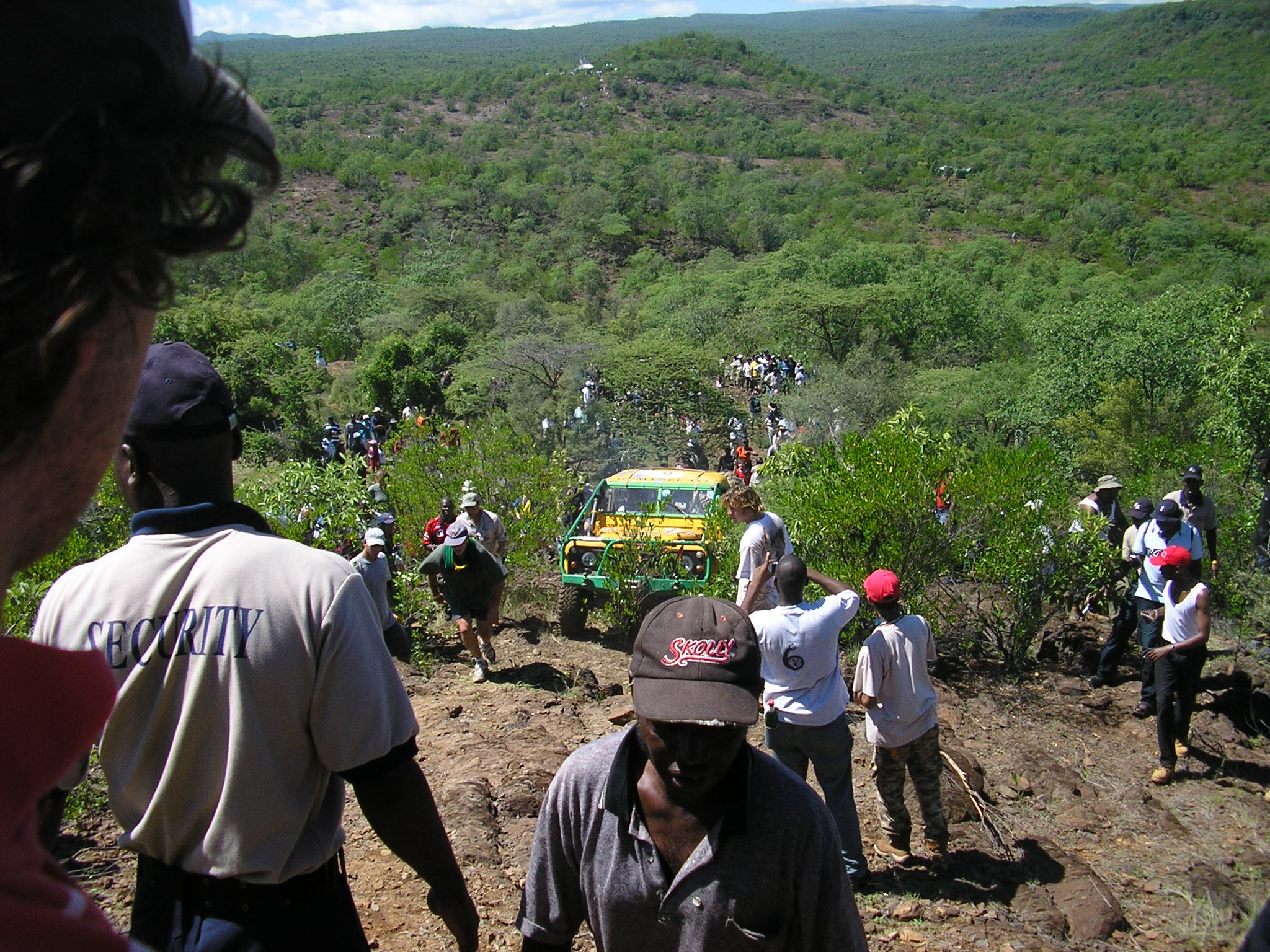
Rhino Charge 2007

== Event Organisation ==
The Rhino Charge is organised by a committee of professional volunteers from various disciplines. The event is held in a different location each year in some of the most remote and wild areas of Kenya. The preparation requires the search for a suitable venue followed by the negotiations with the resident local community and the actual event organisation. Each competition venue is designed with full participation of local community representatives and is sensitive to local considerations.

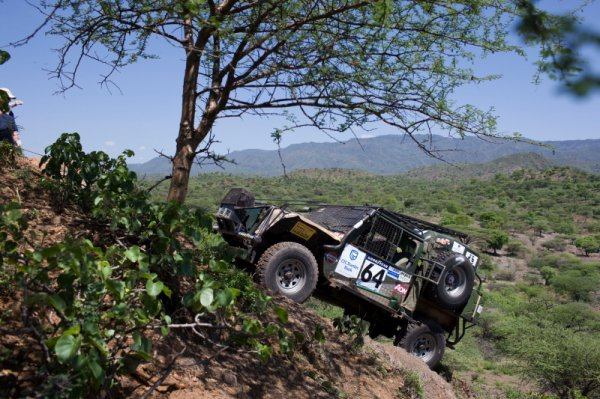
Rhino Charge 2009 - tackling steep terrain

The event, supported by guard post sponsors, event sponsors and raffle donors, takes place at the end of May/beginning of June each year around the Kenyan public holiday Madaraka Day and is open to all, subject to the Rules and Regulations stipulated by the organising Committee. The Committee keeps the event location secret until the day of the event. The secrecy of the location prevents people from being tempted to look at the site ahead of time. A map of the past Rhino Charge venues can be seen here.

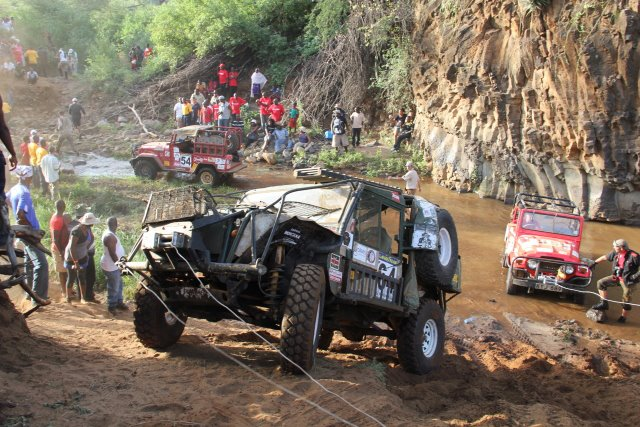
RC Action 2012 at the Gauntlet

The event is organised with the approval of the local District Commissioner, the Kenya Wildlife Service, the Governing Body of Motorsport in Kenya and the land owner(s) / host community.

== Entry Requirements ==
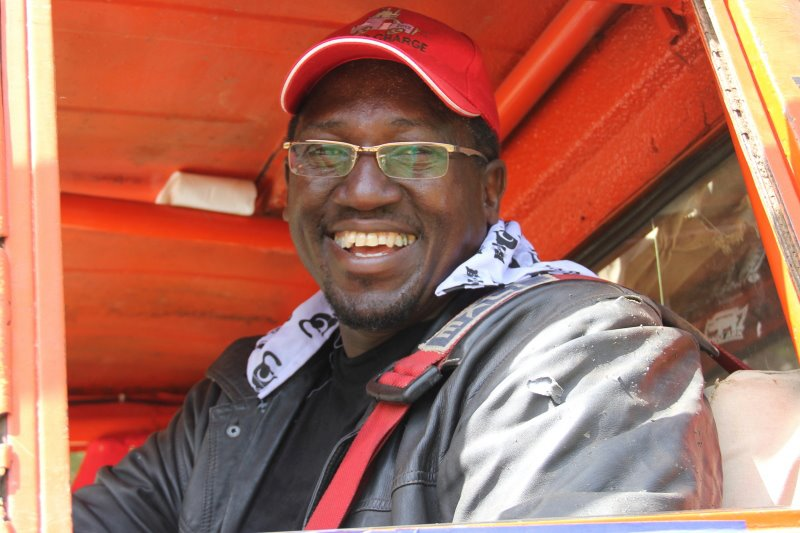
John Kanyali Car 37 Rhino Charge 2012

In the interests of ecological conservation and due to the nature of the ground to be covered, the organisers limit the number of entries to 65 cars. Entries are accepted on a strict policy of "First Come – First Served" within the following categories until the maximum is reached:

1. Before 1 July of each year: All entries from the previous Rhino Charge who raised in excess of KES 2 million shillings are offered automatic entry, which they have to confirm they are taking before the 1 July.
2. Between 1 July and 31 July: Entrants pledging a minimum of KES 1.5 million can enter.
3. Between 1 August and 30 August: Entrants pledging a minimum of KES 1.25 million can enter.
4. Between 2 September 2013 and 30 September 2013 – Entrants pledging a minimum of KES 1 million can enter.
5. From 1 October 2013 onwards - Entrants pledging a minimum of KES 750,000/- can enter.

Any Entrants who have entered in categories 1. - 5. above, and who fail to reach their pledged sponsorship, may be prevented from starting, and may also be refused entry to future events.

== Spectators ==
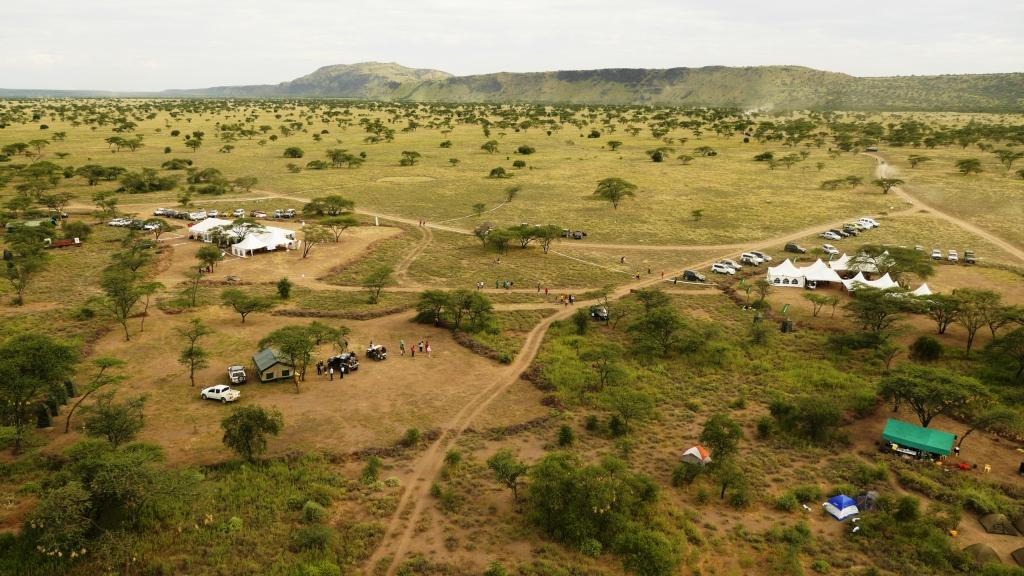
Rhino Charge 2013 Headquarters from above

The Rhino Charge attracts many spectators who visit the event to watch competitors in action and spend a fun weekend out of town. Since 2015 Spectators are required to log in to a ticketing portal for the event and purchase a ticket, accommodation and vehicle pass. In general, spectators are allowed to access the event venue two days before the event day and have to have purchased a ticket, accommodation and vehicle pass (unless traveling in someone else's car) called the "Land Access Fee" (LAF). The Vehicle Pass supports selected projects for the host communities. There is no event access to anyone on the day of the event.

ALL vehicles entering the venue must have 4WD and are required to pay the following Entry Fees:- Kshs 10,000 per vehicle (less than 6 seats) Kshs 20,000 per vehicle (between 6 – 12 seats) Kshs 30,000 per vehicle (13 or more seats)

Spectators are expected to be self-sufficient in food and camping equipment, whether on a self-organised basis or via a camp operator. Information on camping at the Rhino Charge can be found on the website.

== Fundraising Efforts ==
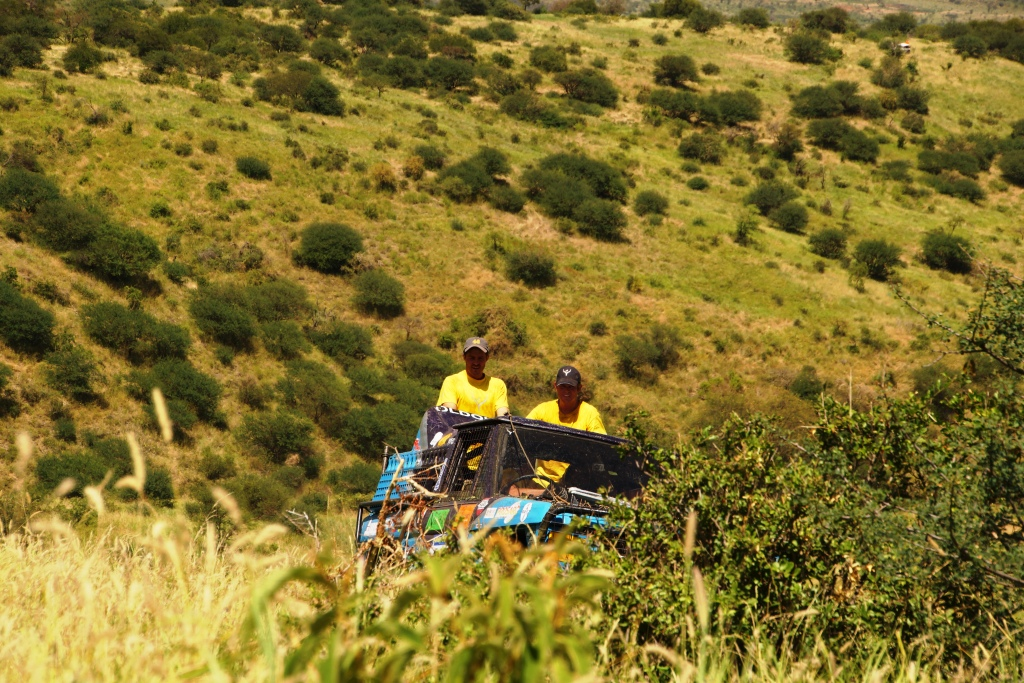
Coming up the hill Rhino Charge 2013

In order to be accepted to the event competitors are required to pledge and raise the minimum sponsorship set by the organising Committee. Most competitors, however, raise considerably more. In 2013, Car No. 5 (Alan McKittrick team) raised KES 12,098,283. Since Car No. 5 entered the Charge in 1989 till 2020, the team has raised a staggering amount of KES 161,029,688. And this is not the only team...Long-time supporters such as Sarah and the late Mike Higgins have raised a total of KES 39,604,399 over the past 20 years.

From 1989 to 2019, the Rhino Charge has raised over KES 1.5 billion. In order to ensure that the funds raised by the competitors go to conservation, the Rhino Charge itself is organised mostly based on in-kind support provided by many volunteers, guard post sponsors, event sponsors and raffle donors, Since 1989, the funds raised have been used for the construction of the Aberdare Electric Fence and supporting conservation activities within the Aberdare ecosystem. With Rhino Ark formally committed to supporting conservation in Mt. Kenya and Mau Eburu ecosystems, funds raised are now used for fencing these two mountain ecosystems, in addition to maintaining the Aberdare Electric Fence and engaging fence-adjacent communities in conservation.

== The Rhino Charge Raffle ==
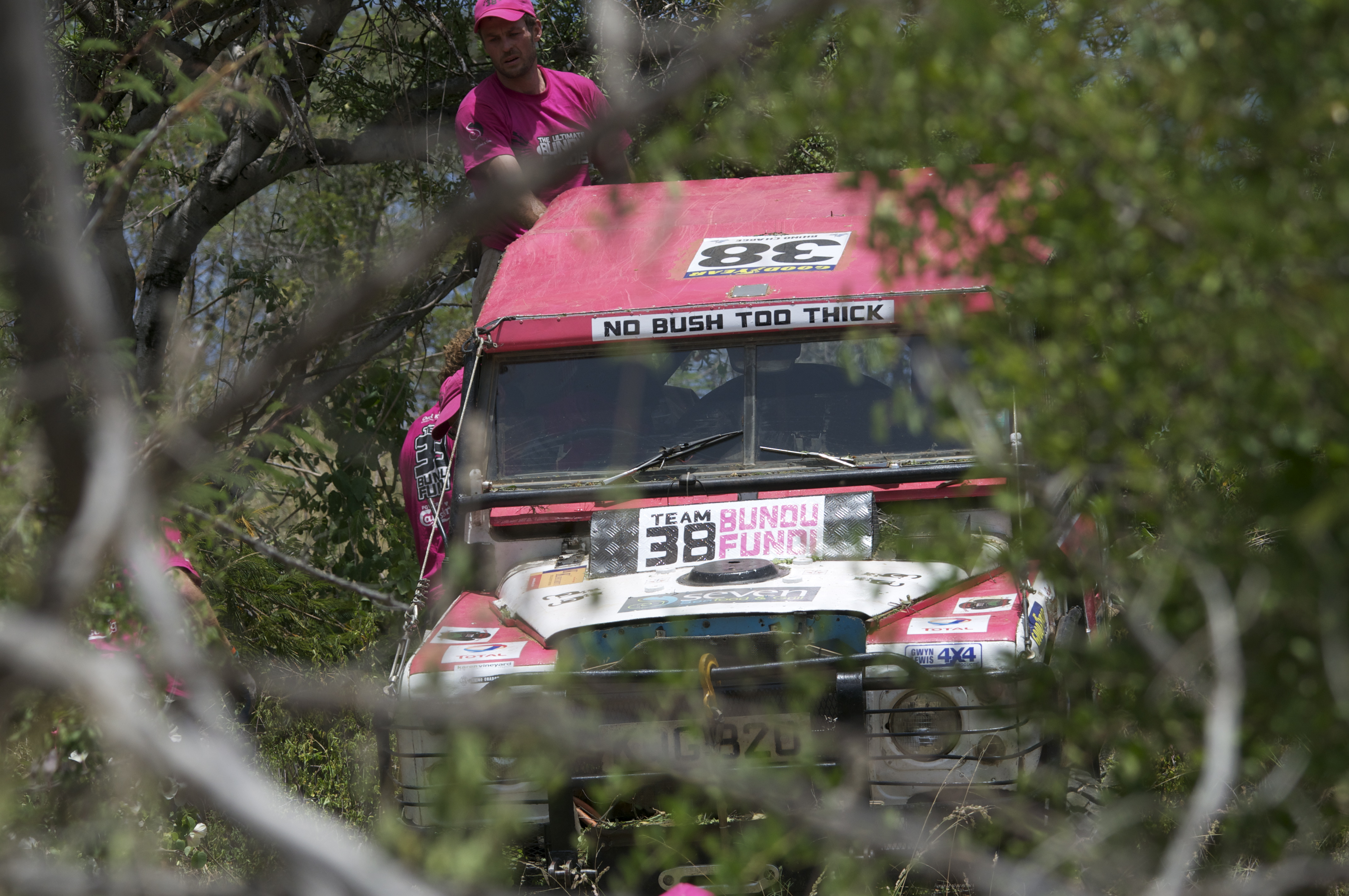
The 2013 Rhino Charge Winners Team BunduFundi "No Bush too Thick"

The Rhino Charge Raffle was introduced in 2002 as a tool to assist Rhino Charge entrants with fund-raising and to thank competitor sponsors for their support. The Raffle offers every donation of KES 2,000 a chance to win a prize, which is a key motivation for the public to support competing cars. The Raffle is organised by a Raffle Committee that voluntarily works towards securing generous prizes from over 100 donors.

== UK Rhino Charge ==
A partner event, the UK Rhino Charge, is held every year in September in Sussex in the United Kingdom. The event has been held every year since 1997, however it is neither as big nor as arduous as its big brother in Kenya but it does allow all types of 4x4 and entrants from enthusiastic novices to hardened experts to enjoy a very different type of day out in the country. All funds raised go towards Rhino Ark, too. In 2017, over £5.000 were raised.

== Other related Events ==
Other events held to raise funds for Rhino Ark are, amongst others, Rhinothon, Run A Ton and the Hog Charge (a children's mountain bike race).

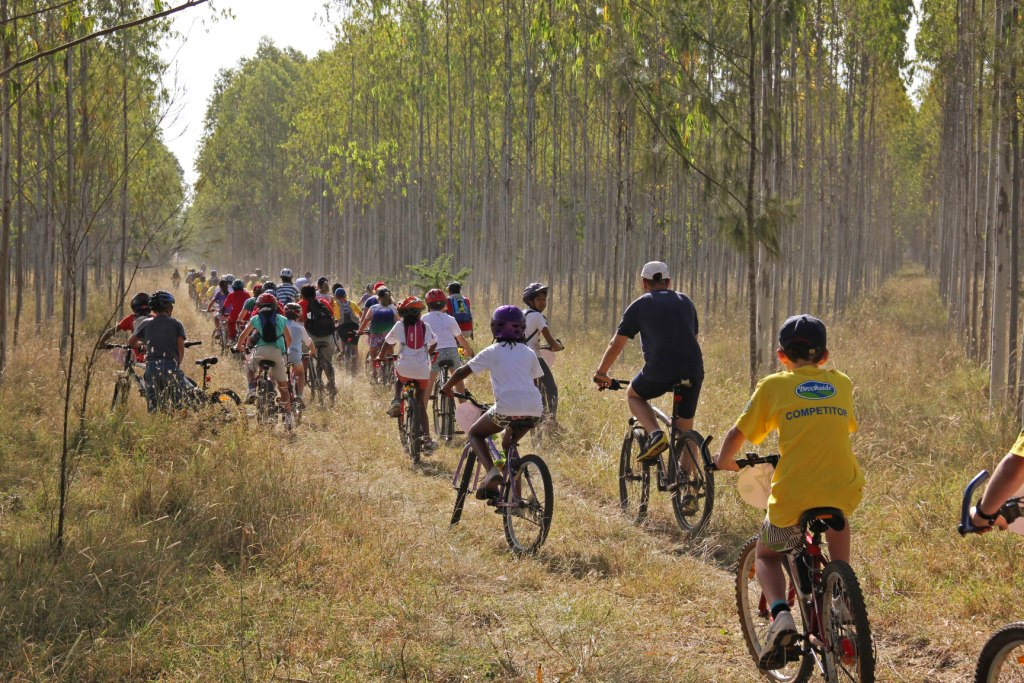
Hog Charge 2014

== Environmental Impact ==
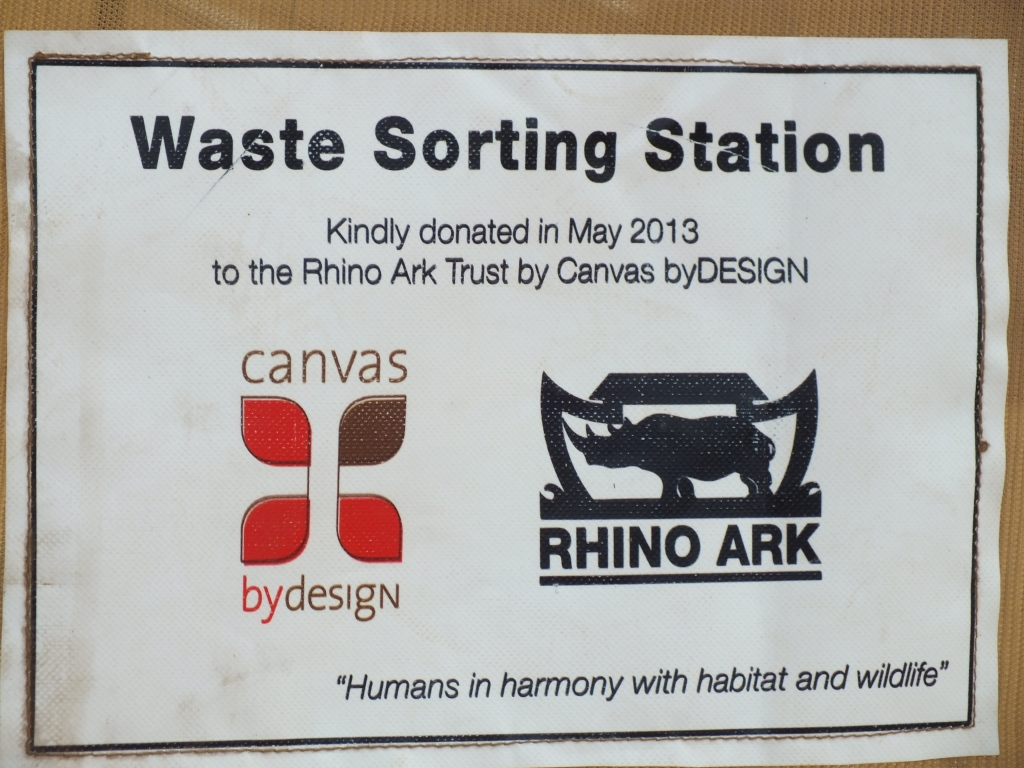
Waste Sorting Station donated by Canvas byDESIGN

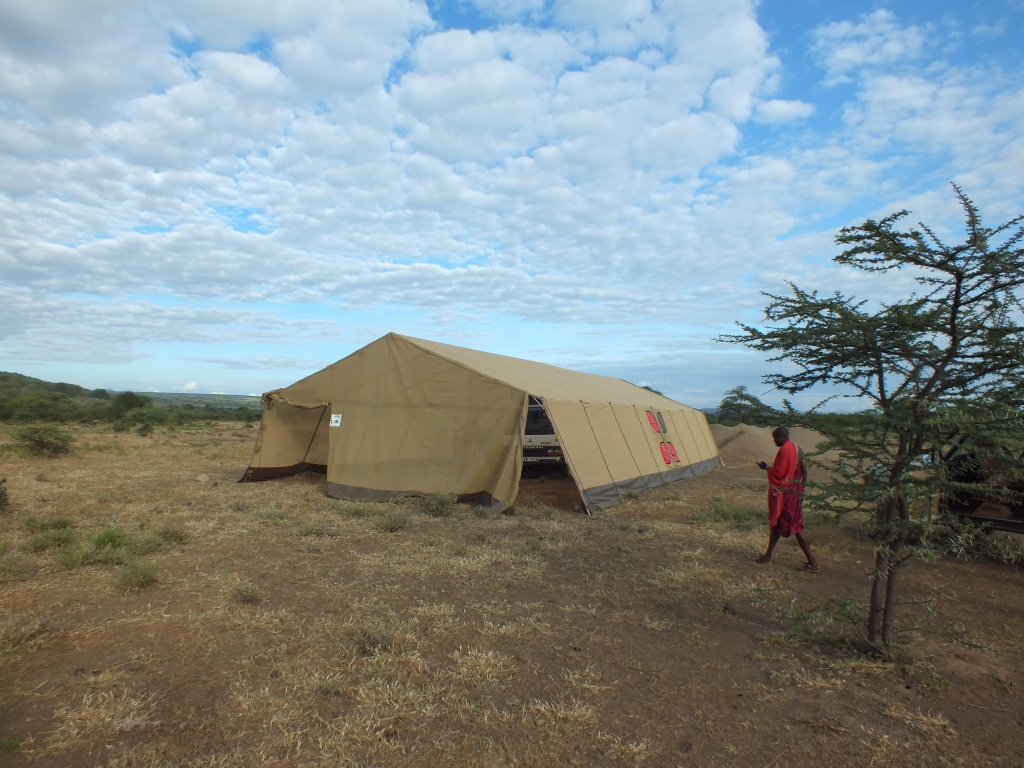
Waste Sorting Station 2013 - view from outside

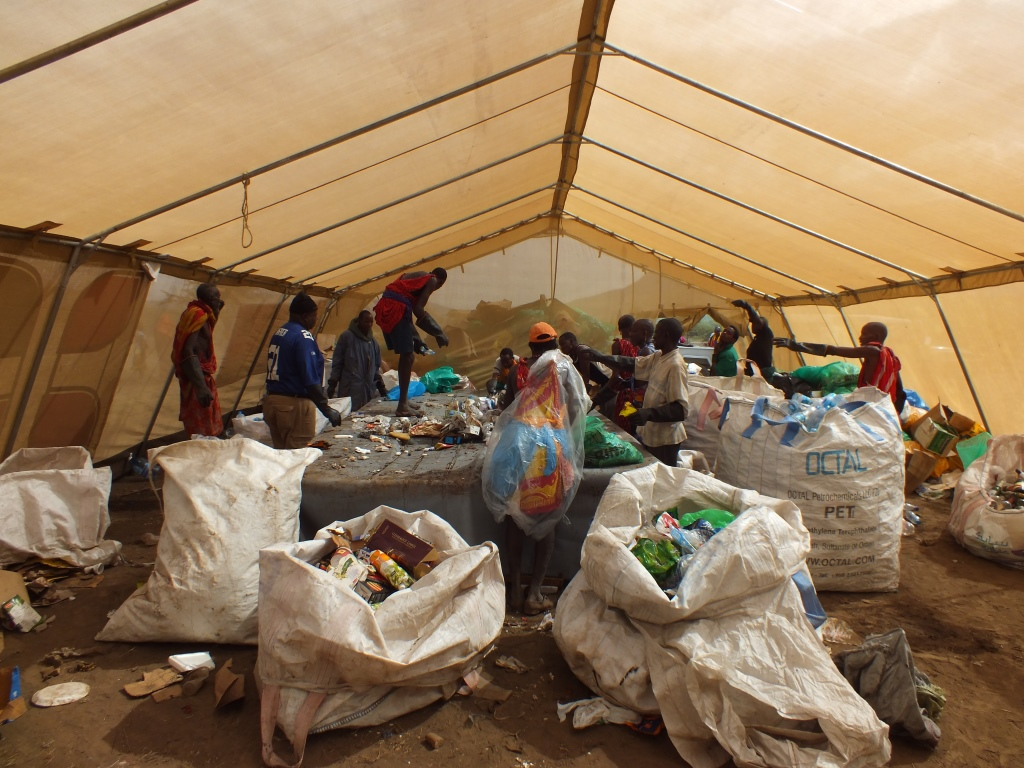
Waste Sorting Station 2013 - view from inside

As a conservation organization, Rhino Ark is sensitive to minimising environmental impacts that could derive from its operations. This extends to the Rhino Charge, Rhino Ark's main fund raising event to support the conservation of Kenya's ‘water towers’. The Rhino Charge minimizes and monitors its footprint. Together with Stanbic, who have enabled independent Environmental Impact Assessments at Rhino Charge venues, it is ensured that the monitoring is comprehensive and scientifically precise. This double check is welcomed by the organisers, participants and sponsors alike, not only as an assurance that the Rhino Charge does no harm but also as an insurance that any negative impact which might arise in future can be rapidly identified and remedied.

Mitigating the impact of the competition cars

The format of the Rhino Charge was developed towards minimising the impact of the competition cars on the environment:

- To prevent significant impacts the duration of the competition is limited to 10 hours and only 65 competition cars can participate in the event;
- To avoid cumulative impacts from consecutive events, the Rhino Charge is organised each year in a different location;
- The carbon footprint for entrants, sponsors, spectators and organisers getting to and running the event is offset each year.

In 2008 Rhino Ark commissioned an environmental and social impact audit of representative samples of venues where the Rhino Charge event has been held. The venues assessed were Tassia Ranch (Mukogodo Division, Laikipia), Swuari Lagha (Wamba Division, Samburu), Ol Kinyei Group Ranch (Mara Division, Narok), and Lorongoswa Group Ranch (Kajiado). The audit was carried out by African Conservation Centre. The audit found that there were minimal impacts on the sites arising from Rhino Charge activities. Recommendations arising from the audit were incorporated into subsequent event venues and course designs.

Recycling the waste generated on the venue

One of the main environmental challenges of organising an event with close to 3,000 participants and spectators in the most remote wilderness areas of Kenya is the management of waste. Keeping with Rhino Ark's conservation mission, the Rhino Charge Committee is committed to leaving each venue as it was found. To this end, stringent rules have been set by the Committee to ensure that no waste is left in the entire Rhino Charge venue. This includes a fine system that is strictly implemented to address wastes by competitors. In addition, with the support of key sponsors, wastes are collected across the venue, including in the Spectator Camp and at the Gauntlet. To promote waste recycling, a Waste Sorting Station is set up at the venue. Glass, cans and tins, plastic bottles, among others, are separated and brought back to Nairobi for recycling. In the 2013 event, almost 50 cubic metres of waste were properly sorted and removed from the venue for recycling.

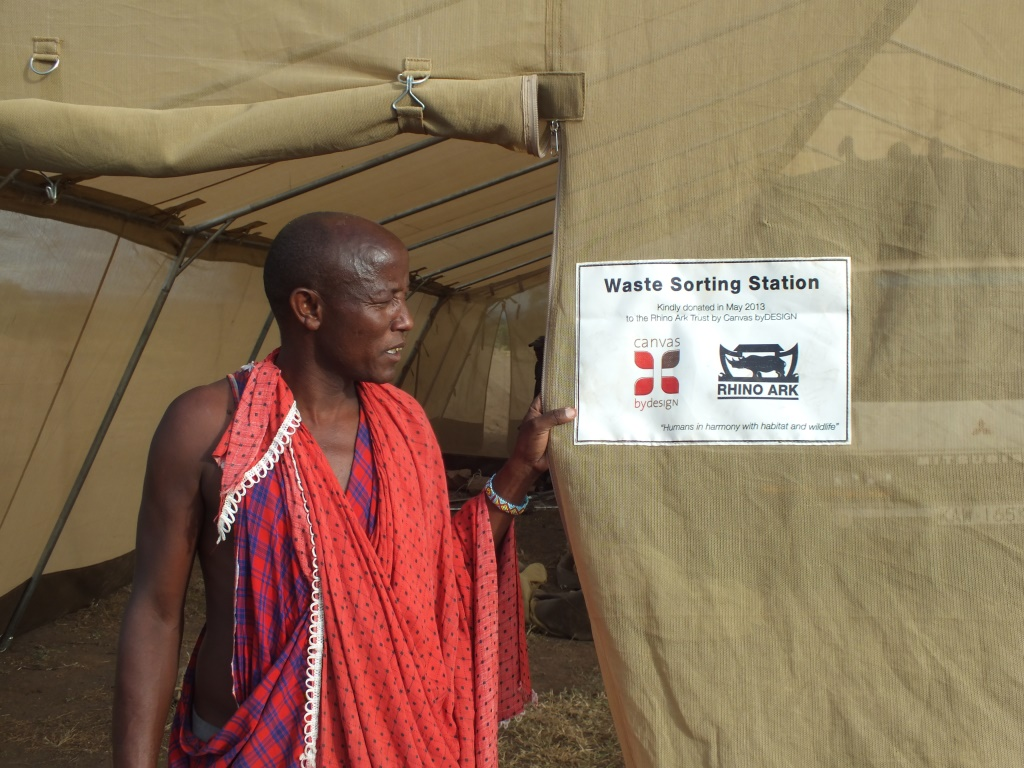
A member of the local Ol Doinyo Nyokie community inspects the Rhino Charge waste sorting station facility

Finally, comprehensive post event reviews of each event site are undertaken in collaboration with the local communities. The team aims at leaving each venue as it was found.

== Awards ==
In 2013, the Rhino Charge received a special award for fundraising efforts towards the conservation of Kenya's water towers by the Total S.A. Eco Challenge.
