= Ondiri Wetland =

Ondiri Wetland (sometimes ũndirĩ Swamp) is a protected wetland and peatbog that is the source of the Nairobi River near Kikuyu in Kiambu County, Kenya. It was formerly known as "Kihenia", meaning shiny surface. However European settlers renamed it "Old Lake", which was later pronounced as "Ondiri".

The wetland is under pressure because of water extraction, deforestation and accelerated erosion. Listed in 2021, the project's conservation is part of a larger initiative by the Kenyan government to reduce pollution to major waterways that provide water supply to Nairobi as part of the Thwake Dam project. The waterway is also important for local greenhouse agriculture. Ondiri Wetland covers 3,713,549 square feet and is a source to 40 springs, which provide water to the local community.

Ondiri was heavily polluted with pesticides and dumping. In 2004, a study found as few as 41 bird species. Around 2020, there were 76 species of birds living in Ondiri. In 2016, the Friends of Ondiri Wetland Kenya (FOWK) was established to rehabilitate and protect the bog; they run awareness campaigns, plant trees, and hold community events. There are now 76 species of birds in the wetland, compared to a 2004 assessment of 44 species.

Kenya's 2022 national celebration of World Wetland Day was held in Ondiri to highlight the importance of the country's largest highland bog. World Wetlands Day National Event 2025 has again been held at Ondiri Wetland. David Wakogy is the Founder of Friends of Ondiri Wetland Kenya (FOWK). The organization also organizes Ondiri Wetland Conservation Run annually.
