= Thwake Dam =

Dam complex in Kenya

- Official name: Thwake Multipurpose Water Development Program
- Country: Kenya
- Location: Athi River, Kenya
- Status: Operational
- Designed by: China Gezhouba Group Company
- Operator: Government of Kenya

Dam and spillways
- Height (foundation): 80.5m
- Website https://thwakedam.go.ke/

The Thwake Dam or Thwake Multi-purpose Water Development Programme, is a dam complex being built on the Athi River in Kenya. The dam is meant to be a multipurpose dam that provides drinking water, agricultural irrigation water, hydropower, and other water supply infrastructure. Water storage is 688 million cubic metres and is meant for rural homes, Konza and other local jurisdictions. The dam cost KSh. 37 billion and is being built by the China Gezhouba Group Company. The Funding was provided by the African Development Fund.

== Phases ==
The construction and implementation of the project were divided into four phases:

Phase 1: Construction of the structural dam wall and spillway downstream of the Athi and Thwake rivers. The wall is 80.5 meters high, holding 688 million cubic meters. The construction started on March 27, 2018 and its completion was to be in November 2022 but was delayed due to funding and Covid-19 pandemic and is set to be completed by June 2025.

Phase 2: This is to implement the dam's hydropower system with a capacity of 20 MW and water treatment plants.

Phase 3: Focuses on the water supply and sanitation infrastructures to serve the populations around Kitui and Makueni. A water waste management system was also developed as part of this phase.

Phase 4: This is aimed at the development of the irrigation scheme around the dam to cover 40,000 hectares.

== pollution concerns ==
The need for potable water from the dam led to a number of conservation projects upstream, trying to create better clean water, such as in Ondiri Wetland. Moreover, many industries had been discharging directly into the river. In July 2021, the dam was criticized by auditor Nancy Gathungu for the lack of clean and safe water to be retained due to pollution locations like Athi River.
