= Gatharaini =

- Location within Kenya
- Coordinates: 1.22°S 36.92°E
- Country: Kenya
- Province: Nairobi Province
- Time zone: UTC+3 (EAT)

Gatharaini is a settlement in Kenya's Nairobi Province.
