= Kerichwa Valley Tuff =

Geological formation in Kenya

The Kerichawa Valley Tuff series is a group of pumice-rich trachytic tuffs and agglomerates. They are younger than the Nairobi Trachyte, found in Nairobi as part of the sediments that were deposited due to formation of the Rift valley.
