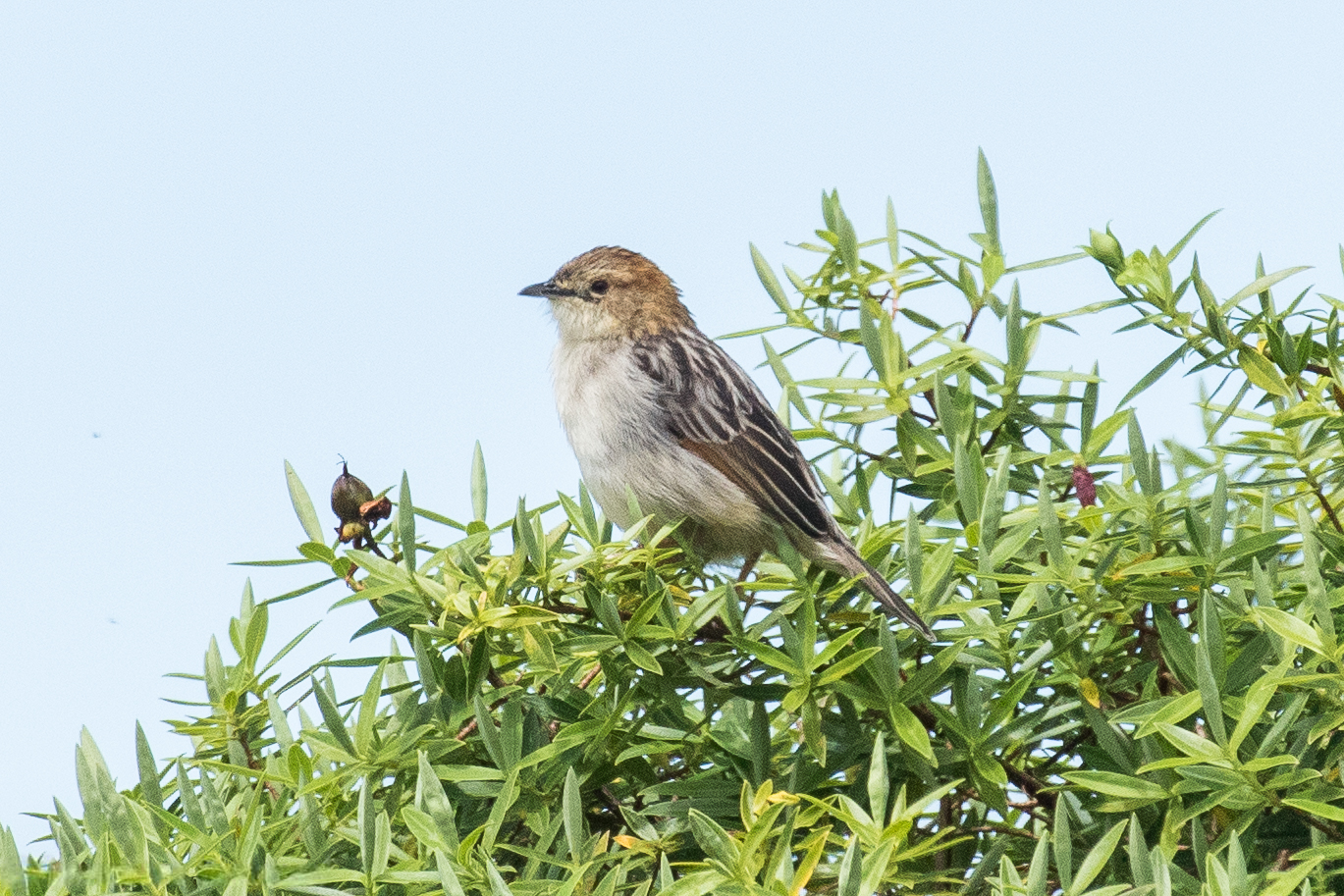

Conservation status
- Vulnerable (IUCN 3.1)

Scientific classification
- Kingdom: Animalia
- Phylum: Chordata
- Class: Aves
- Order: Passeriformes
- Family: Cisticolidae
- Genus: Cisticola
- Species: C. aberdare

Binomial name
- Cisticola aberdare Lynes, 1930

= Aberdare cisticola =

Species of bird

The Aberdare cisticola (Cisticola aberdare) is a species of bird in the family Cisticolidae. It is endemic to Kenya.

Its natural habitat is subtropical or tropical high-elevation grassland. It is threatened by habitat loss.

== Description ==
The Aberdare cisticola is 12–15 cm (4.7–5.9 in) in length, and weighs 18–24 g (0.63–0.85 oz). It is a large and stocky cisticola with a heavy bill, plain face, boldly striped upperparts, and a medium-long graduated tail. Its voice is a mixture of peeuu tew tew and other short trills.

== Diet ==
It feeds on beetles and flies, foraging for them by searching through vegetation and on the ground.

== Behavior ==
The Aberdare cisticola is believed to be monogamous, solitary and territorial. It breeds from January through May and August through November, building a nest out of a flimsy ball of branches and leaves.
