= Mount Satima =

Mountain in Kenya, East Africa

- Location within Kenya

Highest point
- Elevation: 4,001 m (13,127 ft)
- Prominence: 2,081 m (6,827 ft)
- Listing: Ultra; Ribu
- Coordinates: 0°20′59″S 36°37′00″E

Geography
- Location: Kenya
- Parent range: Aberdare Range

Mount Satima, also known as Mount Lesatima and often abbreviated to Satima or Lesatima, is the third-highest mountain in Kenya and the highest in the Aberdare Range. The Maasai name is Oldoinyo Lesatima, which has a variety of alternative spellings, such as Ol Donyo Le Satima, and means "mountain of the bull calf".

The peak lies at the northern end of the Aberdares, which themselves are along the eastern side of the Great Rift Valley, and is their highest point. Around it stand a number of sharp volcanic cones called "the Dragon's Teeth". There are moraines between 3,600 metres (11,800 ft) and 3,800 metres (12,500 ft) on the north west of the mountain. One book on Kenya has called the mountain itself "a craggy bluff of rock and tussock grass around which the clouds swirl".

== See also ==
- Maasai people
- Aberdare Range
- Cloud forest
