= Aberdare National Park =

National park in central Kenya

- Hifadhi ya Taifa ya Aberdare
- IUCN category II (national park)
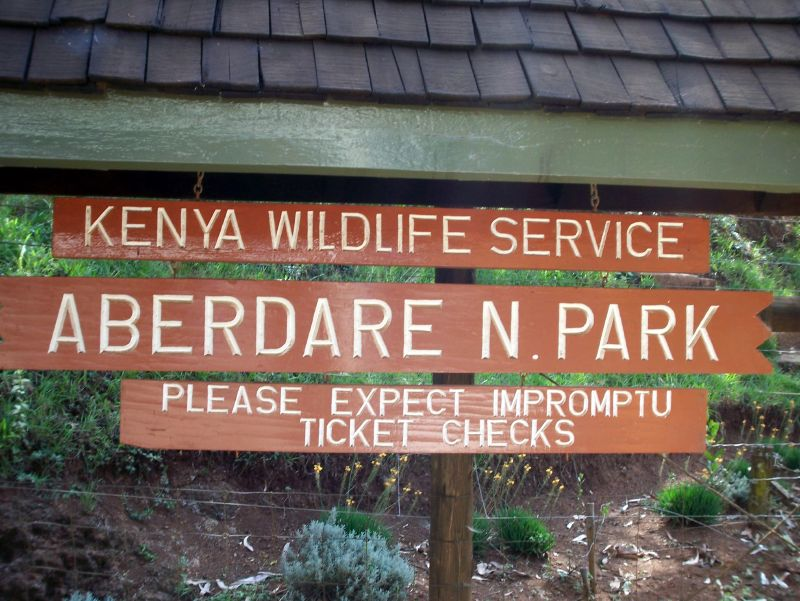
- Aberdare Park entrance

- Location within Kenya
- Location: Kenya, Nyandarua County & Nyeri County
- Nearest city: Nyeri
- Coordinates: 0°25′48″S 36°43′57″E
- Area: 767 km^{2} (296 sq mi)
- Established: 1950
- Governing body: Kenya Wildlife Service

The Aberdare National Park is a protected area in the Aberdare Mountain Range in central Kenya located east of the East African Rift Valley. It covers the higher areas and the Aberdare Salient to the east.

== Overview ==
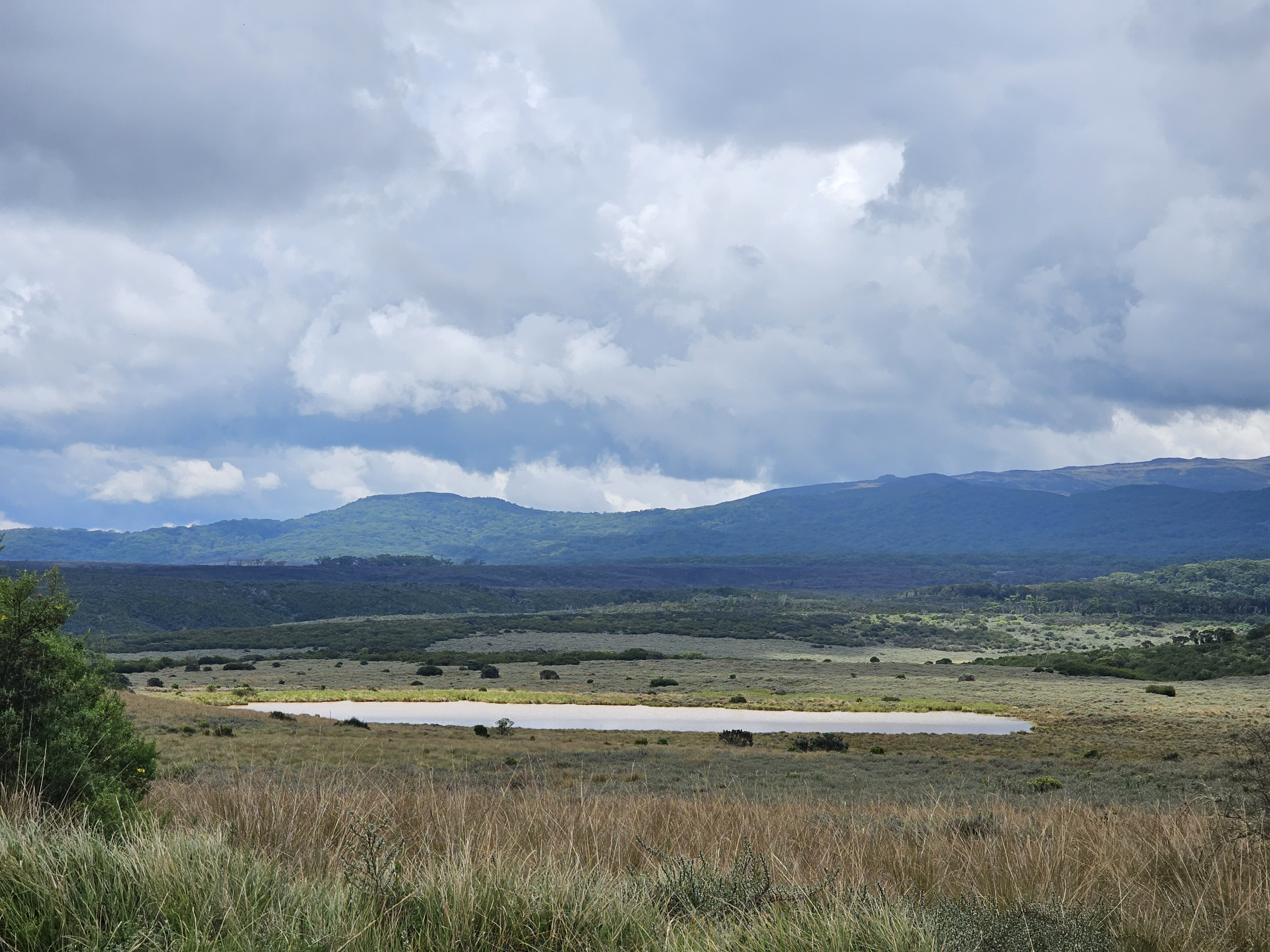
Lake in Aberdare National Park

The park is located about 100 km north of Nairobi and stretches over a wide variety of terrain at elevations from 2,000 m (6,600 ft) to 4,000 m (13,000 ft). Established in May 1950, the Aberdare National Park covers an area of 767 square kilometers and forms part of the Aberdare Mountain Range. The park contains a wide range of landscapes - from mountain peaks that rise to 4,000 m (13,000 ft) to their deep, v-shaped valleys intersected by streams, rivers, and waterfalls. Moorland, bamboo forests and rainforests are found at lower elevations.

== History ==
Aberdare National Park is best known as the site where in 1952, Elizabeth II became Queen after the death of her father King George VI, whilst staying at the Treetops Hotel. Aberdare National Park was established in 1950 with an aim to conserve and protect the Aberdare Mountains. Since then it has grown to a size of an area of 767 km^{2} (296 sq mi).

== Wildlife ==
Wildlife present in the protected area include lion, leopard, elephant, East African wild dog, giant forest hog, bushbuck, mountain reedbuck, waterbuck, Cape buffalo, suni, side-striped jackal, eland, duiker, olive baboon, black and white colobus monkey, and sykes monkey. Rarer sightings include those of the African golden cat and the bongo. Species such as the common eland and serval are found in the higher moorlands. The Aberdare National Park also hosts a large eastern black rhinoceros population and over 250 bird species including the endangered Aberdare cisticola, Jackson's spurfowl, sparrowhawk, African goshawk, African fish eagle, sunbirds and plovers.
