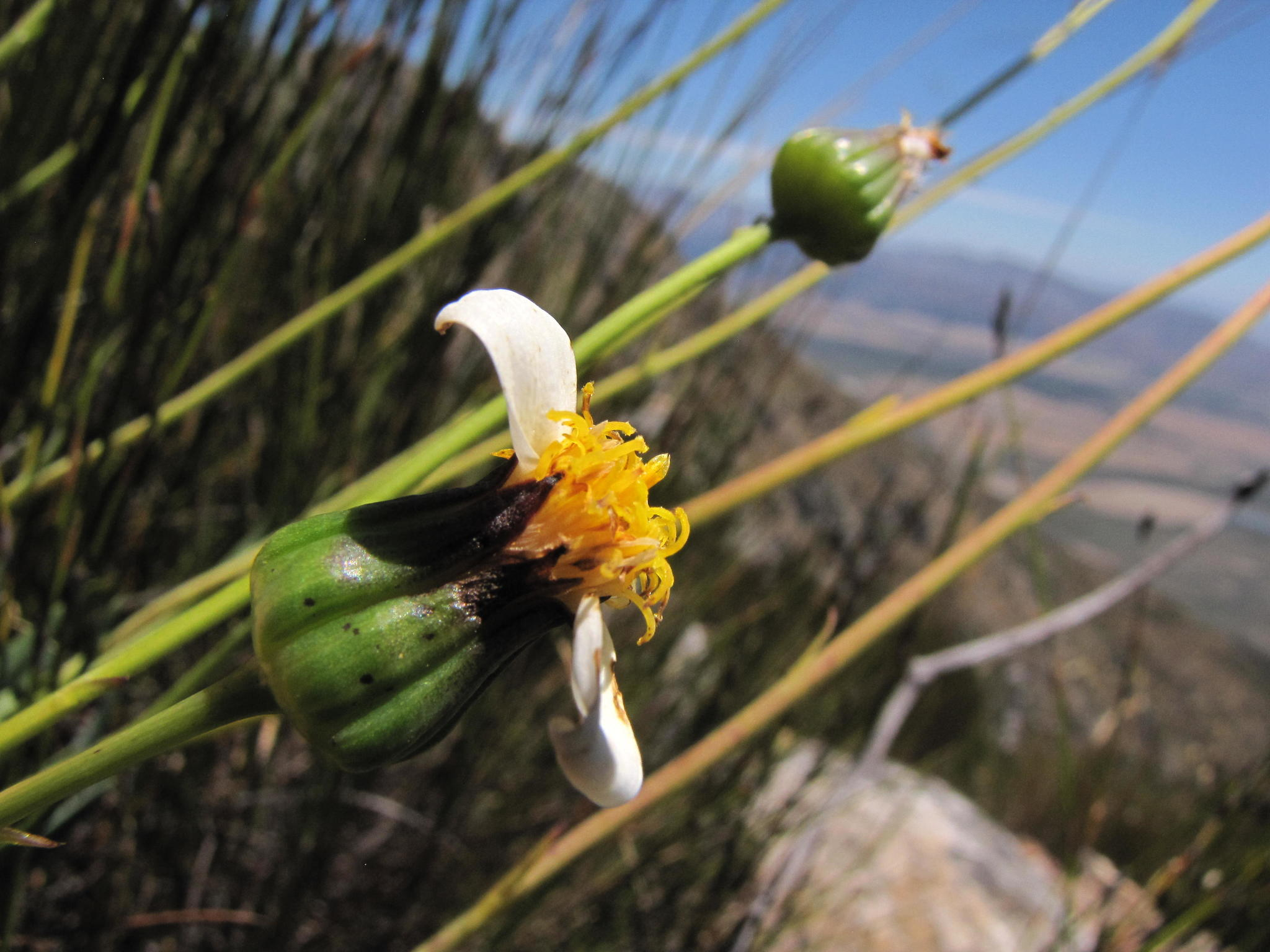

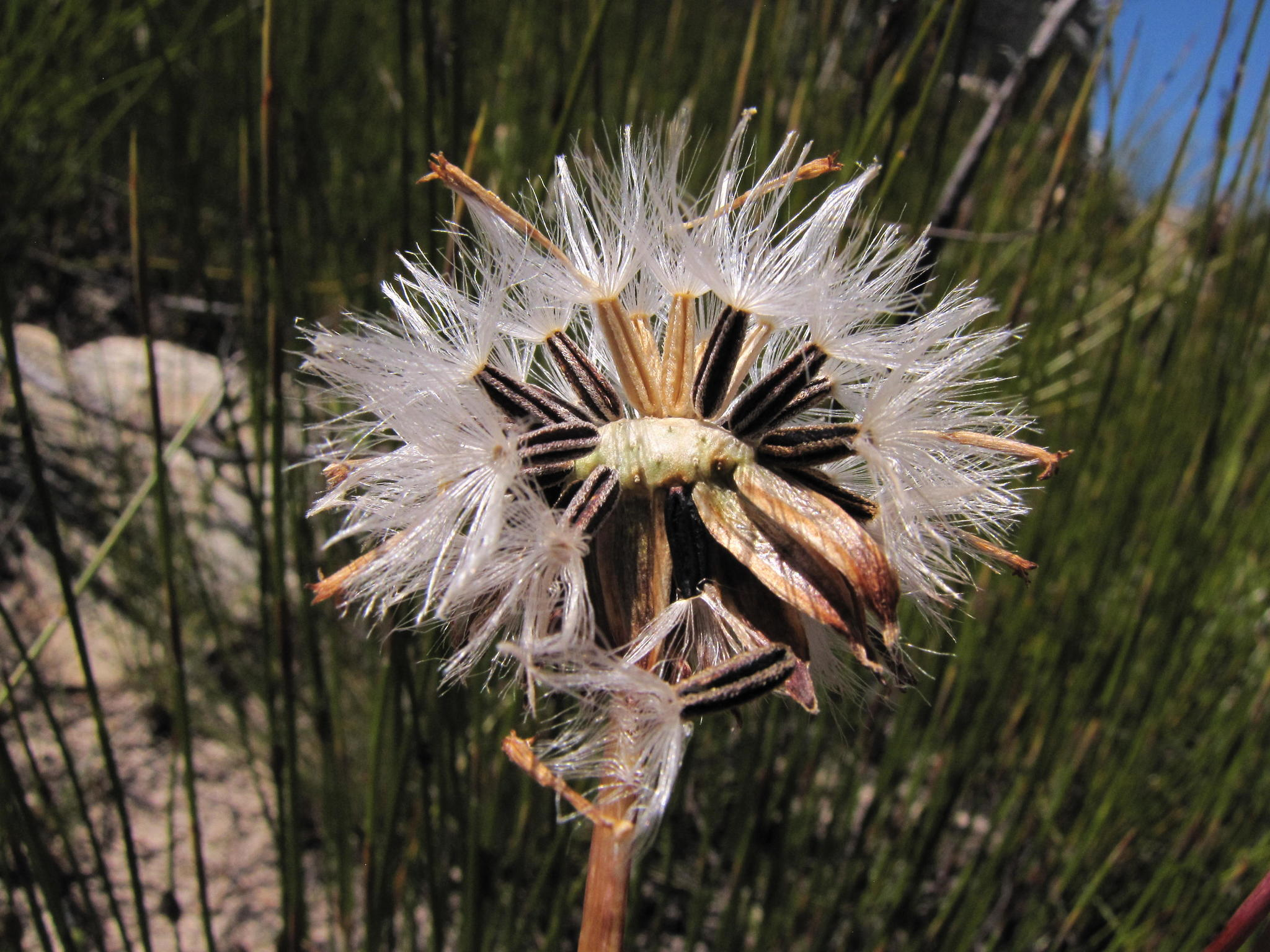

Scientific classification
- Kingdom: Plantae
- Clade: Tracheophytes
- Clade: Angiosperms
- Clade: Eudicots
- Clade: Asterids
- Order: Asterales
- Family: Asteraceae
- Subfamily: Asteroideae
- Tribe: Senecioneae
- Genus: Phaneroglossa; B.Nord.
- Species: P. bolusii

Binomial name
- Phaneroglossa bolusii (Oliv.) B.Nord.

Synonyms
- Senecio bolusii

= Phaneroglossa =

Plant from the daisy family from South Africa

Phaneroglossa is a genus of plants that is assigned to the daisy family. It consists of only one species, Phaneroglossa bolusii, a perennial plant of up to 40 cm (1 1/3 ft) high, that has leathery, line- to lance-shaped, seated leaves with mostly few shallow teeth and flower heads set individually on top of long stalks. The flower head has an involucre of just one whorl of bracts, few elliptic, white or cream ray florets, and many yellow disc florets. It is an endemic species of the Western Cape province of South Africa. Flowering mainly occurs from November to January.

== Description ==
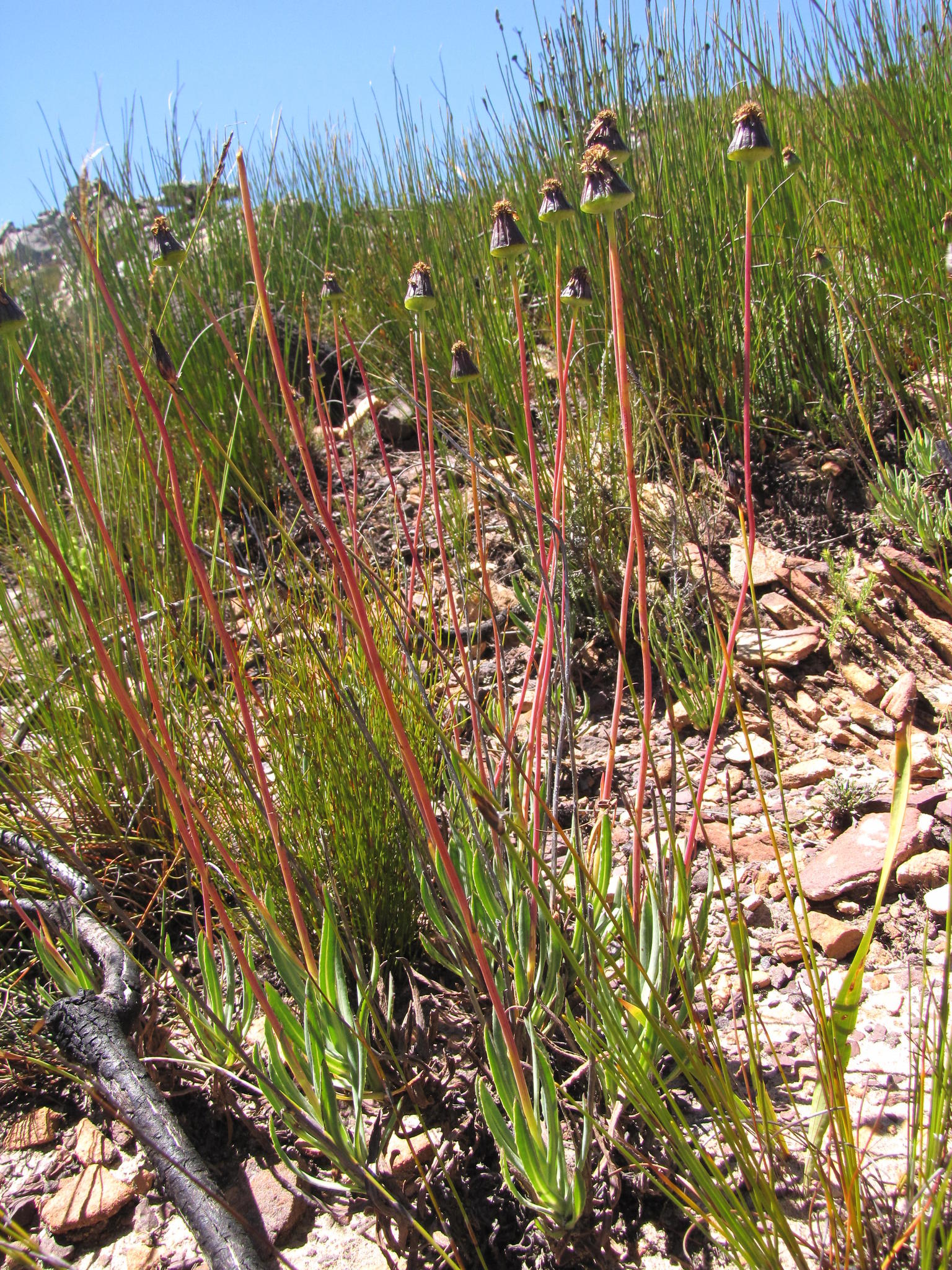
Habit

Phaneroglossa is a low, up to 40 cm (1 1/3 ft) high, perennial plant that is hairless except for the woolly leaf axils, and has short, woody, upwardly inclined stems. Its leaves are crowded on the short stems, leathery in consistency, and set alternately along the stem. The leaves are line-, lance- or inverted lance-shaped, with a conspicuous midvein, seated with the base more or less clasping the stem, with an entire margin or some shallow teeth, often slightly curving down, the tip tapering or ending abruptly in a small sharp point as a continuation of the midvein.

The flower heads are set on top of long, stout, unbranched stalks with few, scattered, awl-, line- or lance-shaped bracts. The flowerhead has an involucre that is initially cup-shaped with a flat base, later becomes broadly cone-shaped, while the bracts eventually flip down to press against the stem when the seeds are ripe. It consists of a single whorl of eleven to fifteen lance-shaped, leathery bracts, with one or three resin ducts tapering to a long point, that are merged at their base, with a distinct thin and dryish margin that has a fringe of soft hairs towards the tips. The common base of the florets is flat and wide, without bracts at the foot of each floret, with a smooth surface except for regularly distributed indents where the florets are implanted.

The flower heads each have five to eight female ray florets that consist of a closed tube at base and a strap nearer the top. The tube is cylinder-shaped and has a few to many blunt hairs, which are several rows of cells thick and are topped with glands. The straps are white or cream-coloured, elliptic or obtuse in shape, mostly have four veins and is split in three teeth at the tip. From the mouth of the ray floret tube emerges a style that splits in two outward curling, hairless branches each topped by an obtuse conical appendage. Surrounding the base of the ray floret corolla are many, white, barbed pappus bristles which are quickly shed in the ray florets. At the base of the ray floret develop eventually dark brown to black, dry, one-seeded, indehiscent fruits called cypselae, which are oblong in shape, and have five or six wing-like, hairless ridges along their lengths.

The ray florets surround many bisexual disc florets with a yellow, tube-shaped corolla that near its top splits star-like into five, outward curving oval lobes with a vein parallel to their margin, a central resin duct and a finely grainy surface near the tips. In the center of each corolla are free filaments, topped by five anthers that are merged into a tube, through which the style grows when the floret opens, hoovering up the pollen on its shaft. The anthers have an arrow-shaped base, and one large, oval appendage at their tip, that is wider than the anther. The filaments each have a distinct bulbous collar just below the anthers. The pappus of the disc florets is persistent, and the cypselae are narrowly oblong, and have always five wings covered with blunt hairs that become slimy when wet.

== Taxonomy ==
This plant was first described by Daniel Oliver in 1884, based on a specimen that had been collected by Harry Bolus on Michell's Pass near Ceres. Bertil Nordenstam, in his revision the tribe Senecioneae, erected the new genus Phaneroglossa, because of the many unusual features exhibited by P. bolusii, and the difficulty to determine its affinities to other species on morphological arguments.

=== Phylogeny ===
Comparison of homologous DNA has increased the insight in the phylogenetic relationships between the Senecioneae. It shows that Phaneroglossa is most closely related to Austrosynotis rectirama, Oresbia heterocarpa and the genus Dendrosenecio. Further research that includes more species and more or other genes may change these insights. The following tree represents current insights.

- - most other Senecioneae
  - - - Austrosynotis
      - - Phaneroglossa
        - - Oresbia
          - Dendrosenecio
    - includes Bethencourtia, Cineraria, Curio, Iranecio, Jacobaea, Kleinia, Packera, Pericallis

== Distribution, habitat and conservation ==
Phaneroglossa can only be found in the Hex River Mountains and in the Kouebokkeveld Mountains near Ceres, where it grows on sandstone slopes in fynbos vegetations at high altitude. It is considered a rare species.
