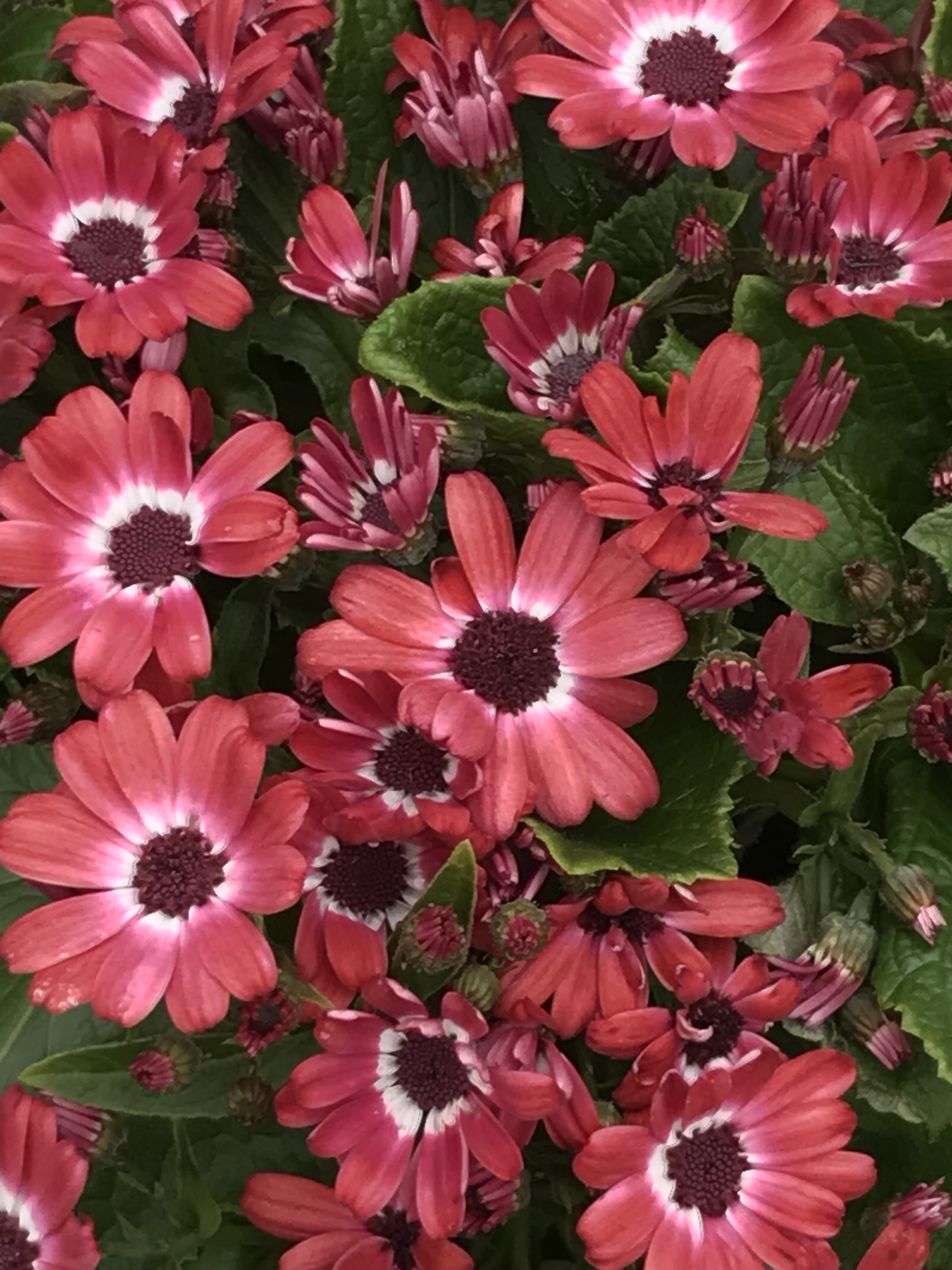

Scientific classification
- Kingdom: Plantae
- Clade: Tracheophytes
- Clade: Angiosperms
- Clade: Eudicots
- Clade: Asterids
- Order: Asterales
- Family: Asteraceae
- Genus: Pericallis
- Species: P. × hybrida

Binomial name
- Pericallis × hybrida (Bosse) B.Nord.

= Pericallis × hybrida =

Species of plant

Pericallis × hybrida, known as cineraria, florist's cineraria or common ragwort is a flowering plant in the family Asteraceae. It originated as a hybrid between Pericallis cruenta and P. lanata, both natives of the Canary Islands. The hybrid was first developed in the British royal gardens in 1777. It was originally known as Cineraria × hybrida, but the genus Cineraria is now restricted to a group of South African species, with the Canary Island species being transferred to the genus Pericallis; some botanists also treat it in a broad view of the large and widespread genus Senecio. Some varieties are sold under the trade name Senetti.

== Cultivation and uses ==
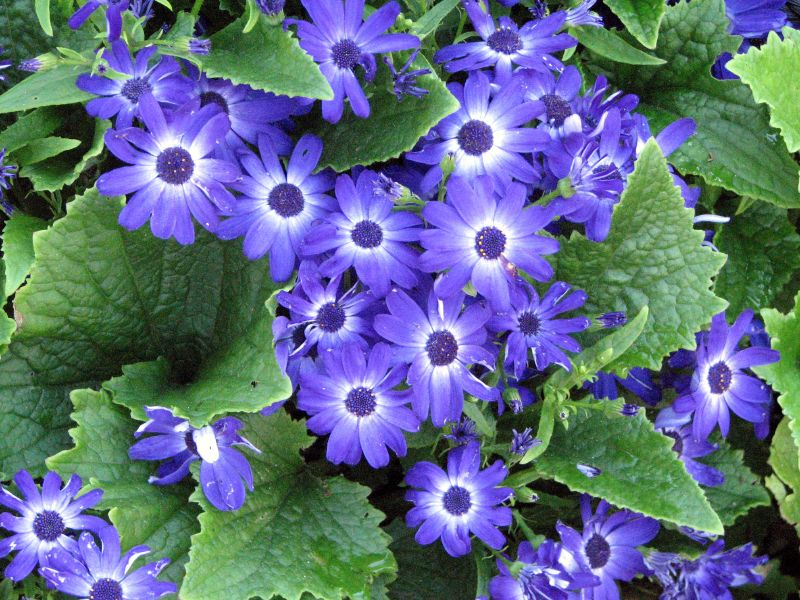
Blue cineraria

Florist's cinerarias can be raised freely from seeds. For spring flowering the seeds are sown in mid spring in well-drained pots or pans, in soil of three parts loam to two parts leaf mould, with one-sixth sand; cover the seed thinly with fine soil, and press the surface firm.

When the seedlings are large enough to handle, prick them out in pans or pots of similar soil, and when more advanced pot them singly in 10 cm pots, using soil a trifle less sandy. They should be grown in shallow frames facing the north. If so situated that the sun shines upon the plants in the middle of the day, they must be slightly shaded; give plenty of air, and never allow them to get dry. When well established with roots, shift them into 15 cm pots, which should be liberally supplied with manure water as they get filled with roots.

In winter remove to a pit or house, where a little heat can be supplied whenever there is a risk of their getting frozen. They should stand on a moist bottom, but must not be subjected to cold draughts. When the flowering stems appear, give manure water at every alternate watering. Seeds sown in early spring, and grown on in this way, will be in flower by Christmas if kept in a temperature of from 5° to 7 °C at night, with a little more warmth in the day. Those sown in April and May will follow them during the early spring months, the latter set of plants being subjected to a temperature of 4° to 5 °C during the night. If grown much warmer than this, the chrysanthemum leaf miner may damage the leaves, tunnelling its way between the upper and lower surfaces and making whitish irregular markings all over. Such affected leaves must be picked off and burned. Aphids are also a major pest.
