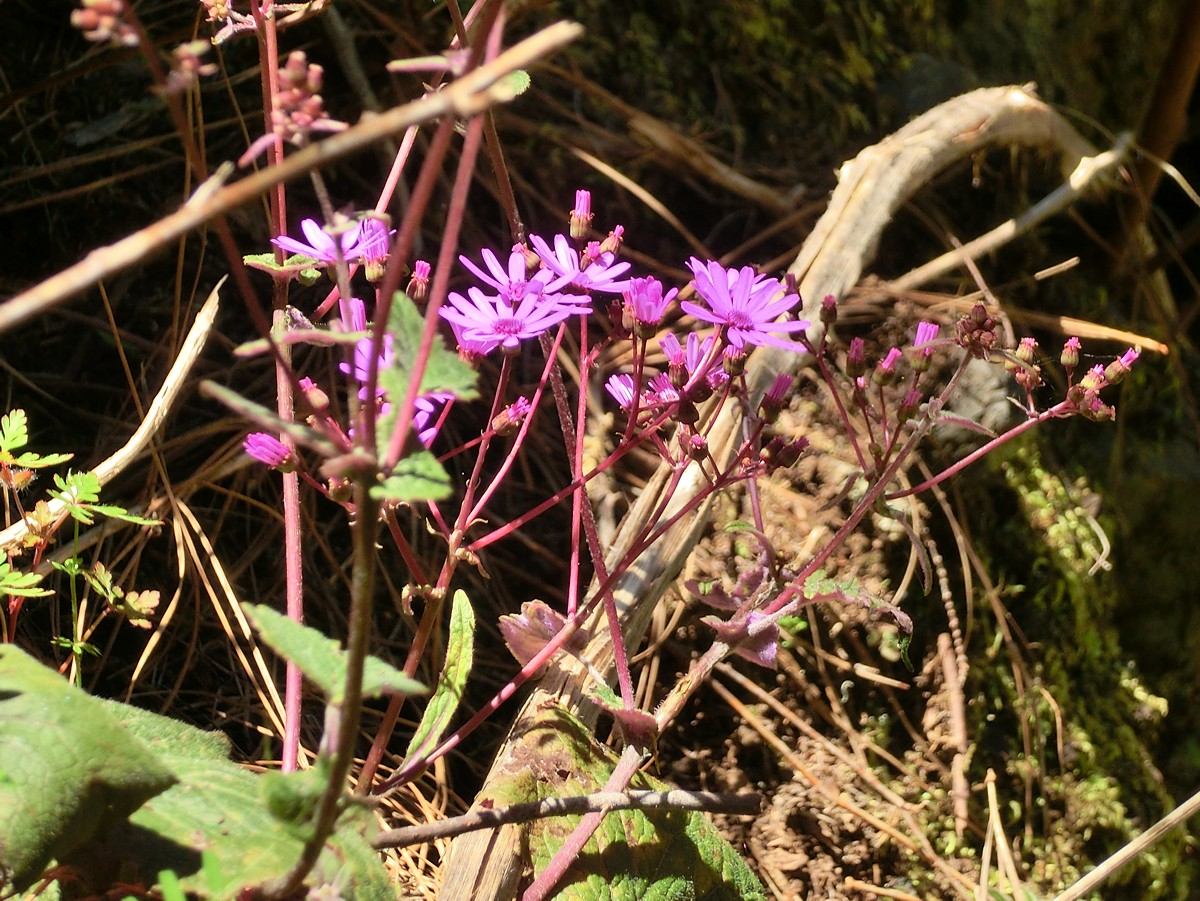
- Flowers
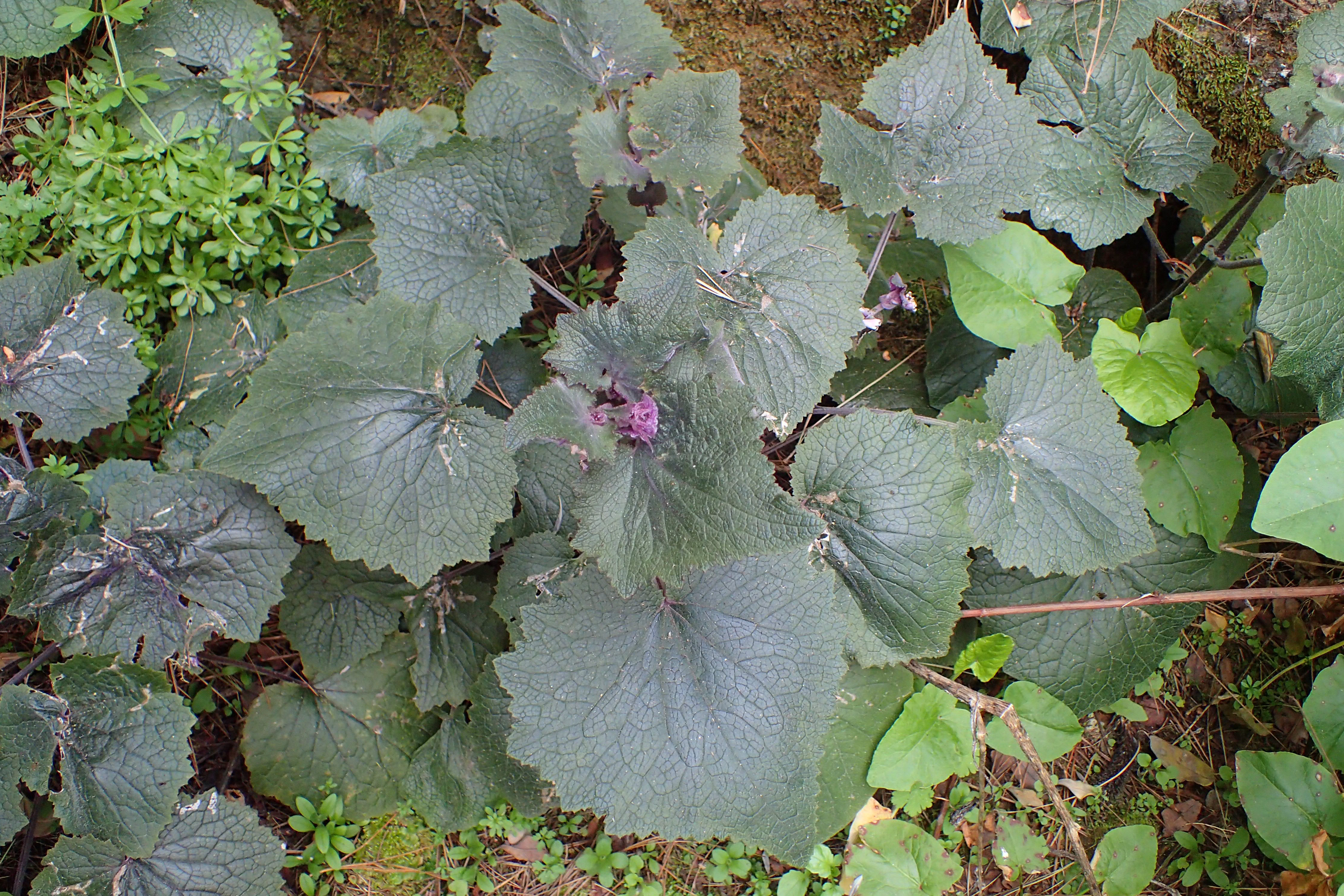
- Foliage

Scientific classification
- Kingdom: Plantae
- Clade: Embryophytes
- Clade: Tracheophytes
- Clade: Angiosperms
- Clade: Eudicots
- Clade: Asterids
- Order: Asterales
- Family: Asteraceae
- Genus: Pericallis
- Species: P. cruenta

Binomial name
- Pericallis cruenta Webb & Berthel.

Synonyms
- List: Cineraria cruenta L'Hér.; Cineraria lactea J.Jacq.; Cineraria lanata Link; Doronicum cruentum (L'Hér.) Sch.Bip.; Senecio cruentus (L'Hér.) DC.; Tussilago rubra Link

= Pericallis cruenta =

Species of flowering plant

Pericallis cruenta (syns. Senecio cruentus and Cineraria cruenta) is a species of flowering plant in the family Asteraceae, native to La Gomera and Tenerife islands of the Canary Islands. It has a non‑woody growth form and is typically found growing in Tenerife's laurel forests.

With Pericallis lanata it is a parent of the widely cultivated garden plant Pericallis × hybrida, the florist's cineraria. In the past, and continuing today, there has been confusion and debate about the identity and origin of Pericallis × hybrida, with Pericallis cruenta being incorrectly called a 'feral' form of the florist's cineraria.

In 1895 in a series of letters and articles in The Gardeners' Chronicle and Nature, William Turner Thiselton-Dyer argued that the garden plant Cineraria cruenta was derived by simple breeding from the wild plant Senecio cruentus, while William Bateson argued that it was of hybrid origin. The argument was resolved by Bateson, who enlisted Richard Irwin Lynch, Curator of the Cambridge University Botanic Garden, to do some experimental crosses in 1897. Published in 1900, the results showed that the garden cineraria is clearly of hybrid origin. In fact, members of the genus Pericallis had been brought to England in 1777 and 1780, and by the early 1800s had been extensively hybridized by horticulturalists. By the time of the debate, there were numerous cultivars displaying wide morphological variation.
