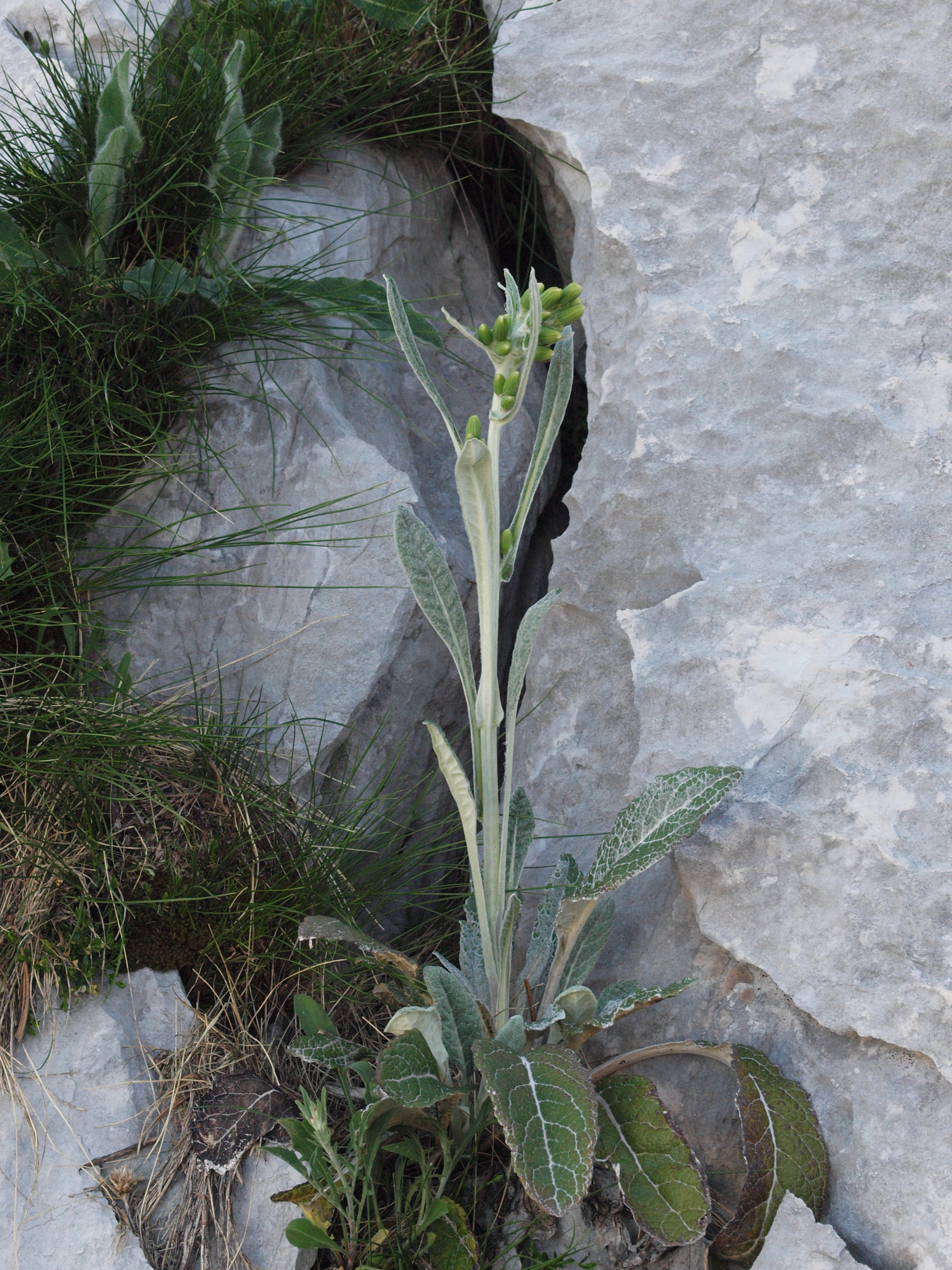
- Senecio thapsoides ssp. visianianus

Scientific classification
- Kingdom: Plantae
- Clade: Tracheophytes
- Clade: Angiosperms
- Clade: Eudicots
- Clade: Asterids
- Order: Asterales
- Family: Asteraceae
- Genus: Senecio
- Species: S. thapsoides

Binomial name
- Senecio thapsoides DC.

= Senecio thapsoides =

Species of flowering plant

Senecio thapsoides DC. is a plant in the aster family (Asteraceae). The species was formerly placed in subgenus Cineraria and is sometimes found as Cineraria thapsoides. Cineraria however is now almost entirely limited to Southern Africa. The species was first named by Augustin Pyramus de Candolle in 1838. It is recognized in Flora europaea with two subspecies: thapsoides and S. t. visianianus.
