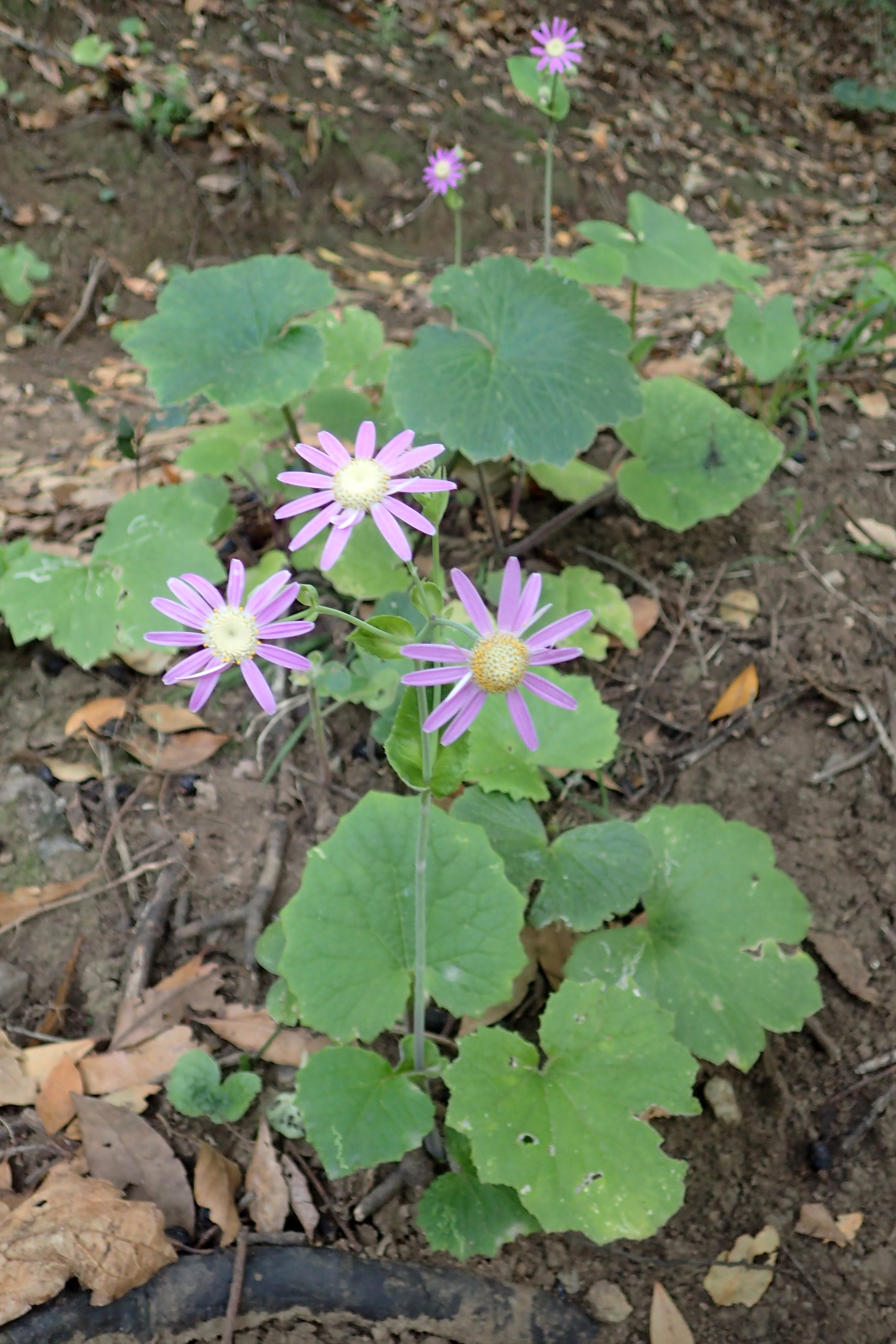

Scientific classification
- Kingdom: Plantae
- Clade: Tracheophytes
- Clade: Angiosperms
- Clade: Eudicots
- Clade: Asterids
- Order: Asterales
- Family: Asteraceae
- Genus: Pericallis
- Species: P. tussilaginis

Binomial name
- Pericallis tussilaginis (L'Hér.) D.Don

Synonyms
- Cineraria tussilaginis L'Hér.; Cineraria waterhousiana Paxton; Doronicum tussilaginis (L'Hér.) Sch.Bip.; Senecio tussilaginis (L'Hér.) Lindl.

= Pericallis tussilaginis =

Species of flowering plant

Pericallis tussilaginis is a species of flowering plant in the family Asteraceae.
