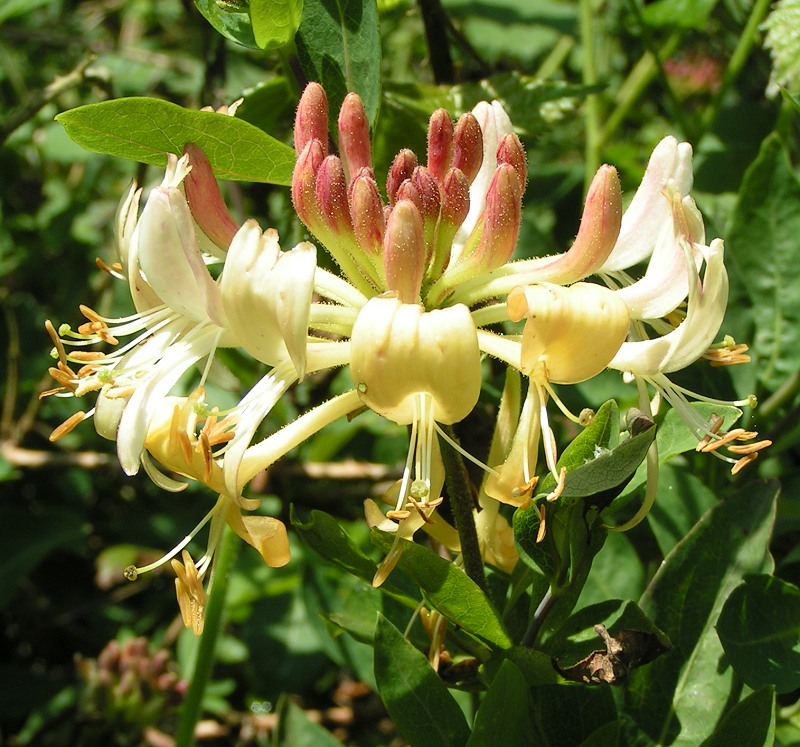

Scientific classification
- Kingdom: Plantae
- Clade: Tracheophytes
- Clade: Angiosperms
- Clade: Eudicots
- Clade: Asterids
- Order: Dipsacales
- Family: Caprifoliaceae
- Genus: Lonicera
- Species: L. periclymenum

Binomial name
- Lonicera periclymenum L.

Synonyms
- Caprifolium distinctum Moench; Caprifolium germanicum Röhl.; Caprifolium periclymenum (L.) Delarbre; Caprifolium quercifolium Meigen; Caprifolium semperflorens Dippel; Euchylia verticillata Dulac; Lonicera hispanica Boiss. & Reut.; Periclymenum vulgare Mill.

= Lonicera periclymenum =

Species of plant

Lonicera periclymenum, common names honeysuckle, common honeysuckle, European honeysuckle, or woodbine, is a species of flowering plant in the family Caprifoliaceae native to much of Europe, North Africa, Turkey and the Caucasus. It is found as far north as southern Norway, Sweden and Finland.

== Description ==
Growing to 7 m (23 ft) or more in height, it is a vigorous deciduous twining climber, occasionally keeping its old leaves over winter. In the UK it is the only native honeysuckle. It is often found in woodland, scrubland, and in hedgerows.

The tubular, two-lipped flowers, creamy white or yellowish in colour, may be flushed with pink or red on the outside and in bud, and are carried in showy clusters at the ends of the shoots. The flowers are highly scented by night, much less so by day.

== Ecology ==
The plant is usually pollinated by moths or long-tongued bees and develops bright red berries. Dormice make summer nests for their young from honeysuckle bark; they also eat the flowers, which are a good source of energy-rich nectar. Night-flying moths such as the hummingbird hawk-moth can detect the scent of honeysuckle flowers up to a quarter of a mile away. The clusters of red berries are eaten in the autumn by birds such as thrushes, bullfinches and warblers.

== Cultivation ==
Lonicera periclymenum is one of several honeysuckle species valued in the garden, for its ability to twine around other plants, or to cover unsightly walls or outbuildings; and for the intense fragrance of its profuse flowers in summer. It needs to be planted with its roots in the shade, and its flowering top in sun or light shade. Plants need to be chosen with care as they can grow to a substantial size. The cultivars 'Graham Thomas' and 'Serotina' have gained the Royal Horticultural Society's Award of Garden Merit.

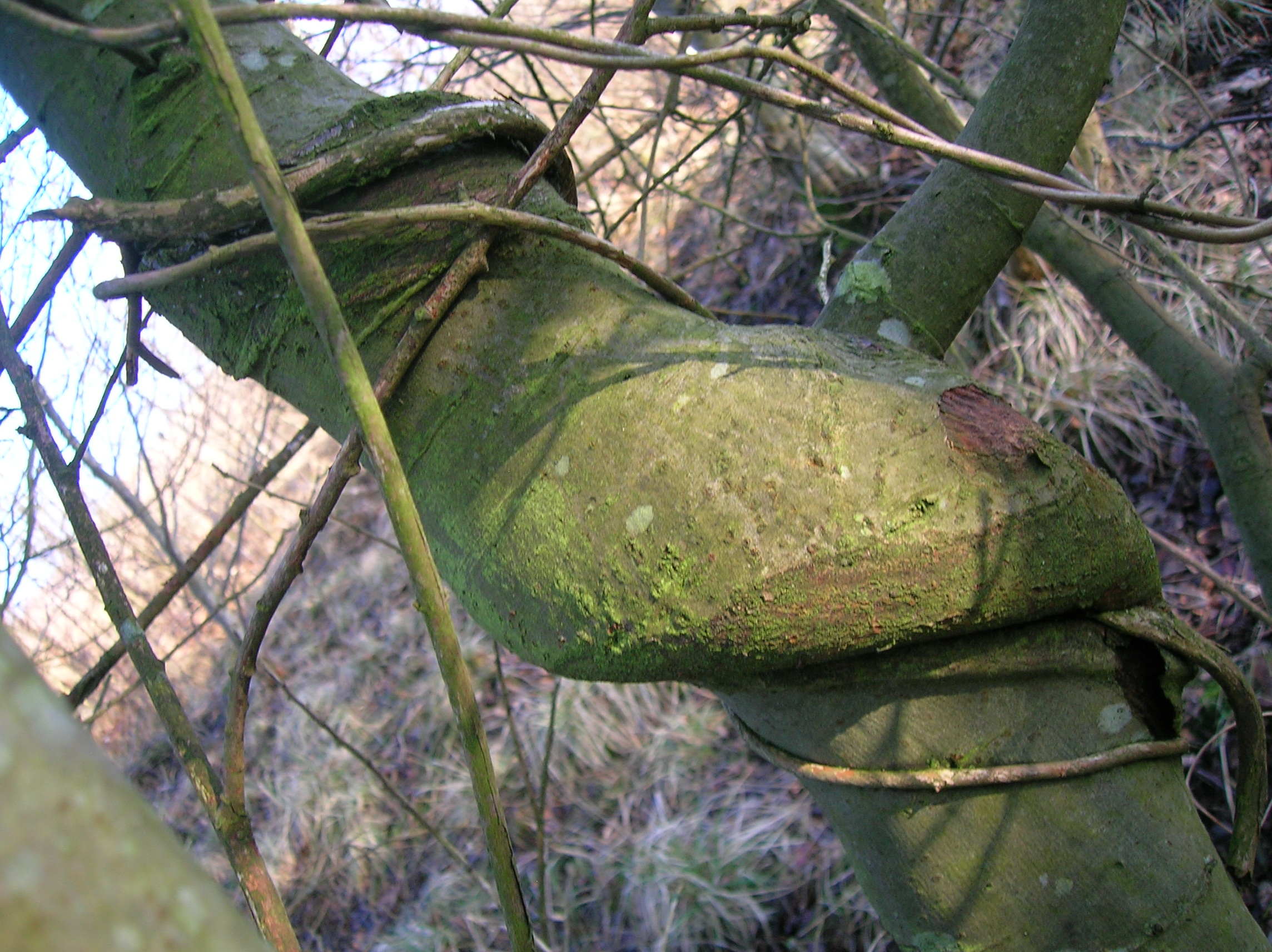
Woodbine on a willow tree

== Pests ==
Chromatomyia aprilina – honeysuckle leaf miner

== Cultural references ==
In William Shakespeare’s play A Midsummer Night's Dream he refers to woodbine/honeysuckle twice:

1. (Act II Scene 1) "Quite overcanopied with luscious woodbine"
2. (Act IV Scene 1) "So doth the woodbine the sweet honeysuckle gently entwine"

It seems probable that the first quotation is referring to the honeysuckle L. periclymenum, a common sight in hedgerows in Shakespeare’s time. The second quotation is somewhat more confusing. It is thought that on this occasion, "woodbine" refers to a species of Convolvulus, also very common but nowadays called "bindweed".
