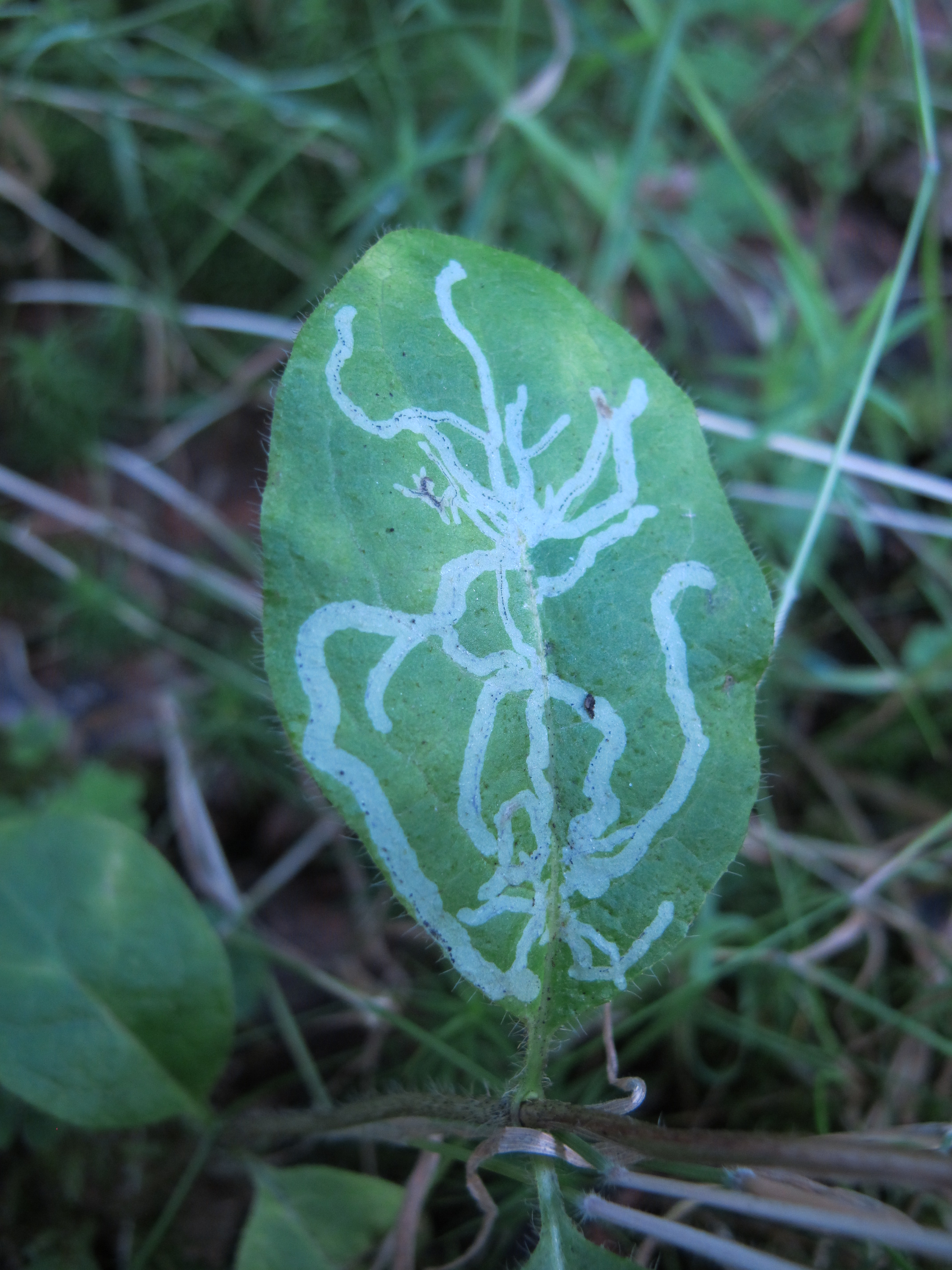

Scientific classification
- Kingdom: Animalia
- Phylum: Arthropoda
- Clade: Pancrustacea
- Class: Insecta
- Order: Diptera
- Family: Agromyzidae
- Genus: Chromatomyia
- Species: C. aprilina

Binomial name
- Chromatomyia aprilina Goreau 1851

= Chromatomyia aprilina =

Species of fly

Chromatomyia aprilina is a small fly whose larvae creates a mine in the leaves of honeysuckle (Lonicera periclymenum) and other closely related species, including Symphoricarpos albus. The mine is initially star-shaped, but as the larvae grows the tunnels become straighter. This species is widespread and probably common throughout western Europe.
