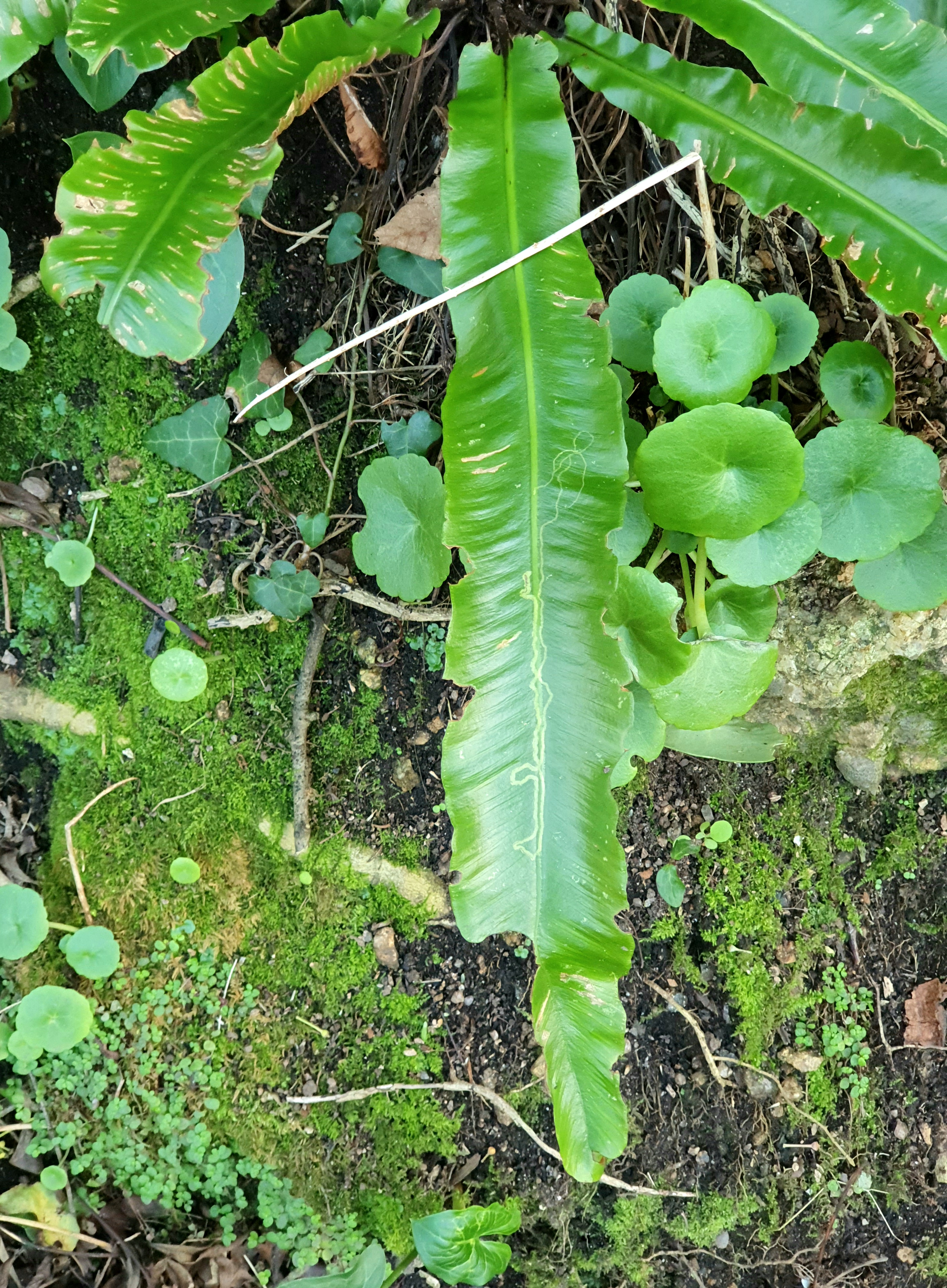
- Mine on hart's-tongue fern

Scientific classification
- Kingdom: Animalia
- Phylum: Arthropoda
- Clade: Pancrustacea
- Class: Insecta
- Order: Diptera
- Family: Agromyzidae
- Genus: Chromatomyia
- Species: C. scolopendri

Binomial name
- Chromatomyia scolopendri (Robineau-Desvoidy, 1851)

Synonyms
- Phytomyza scolopendri Robineau-Desvoidy, 1851; Phytomyza scolopendri Goureau, 1851; Chromatomyia scolopendri (Robineau-Desvoidy, 1851)

= Chromatomyia scolopendri =

Species of fly

Chromatomyia scolopendri is a species of leaf-mining fly in the family Agromyzidae, of the order Diptera. The larva mine the leaves of ferns. It was described by Jean-Baptiste Robineau-Desvoidy in 1851 and is found in Europe (Denmark, the Iberian Peninsula, Italy, Ireland and Poland; also in Thrace).

== Life history ==
The larvae are leaf miners and feed in a long (up to 10 cm), greenish corridor with the frass, in an almost uninterrupted line. In small ferns, the mine follows the edge and become a blotch, while in larger leaves, where space is not limited the long linear mine can curve smoothly and can also mine the midrib. Pupation is usually within the mine.

It had been recorded on rustyback (Asplenium ceterach), wall-rue (Asplenium ruta-muraria), hart's-tongue fern (Asplenium scolopendrium), forked spleenwort (Asplenium septentrionale) and common polypody (Polypodium vulgare).

== Distribution ==
Found in Europe, from Poland to Ireland, and from Italy and the Iberian Peninsula to Denmark.

== Parasitoids ==
- Chorebus punctum (Goureau, 1851)
- Apodesmia posticatae (Fischer, 1957)
