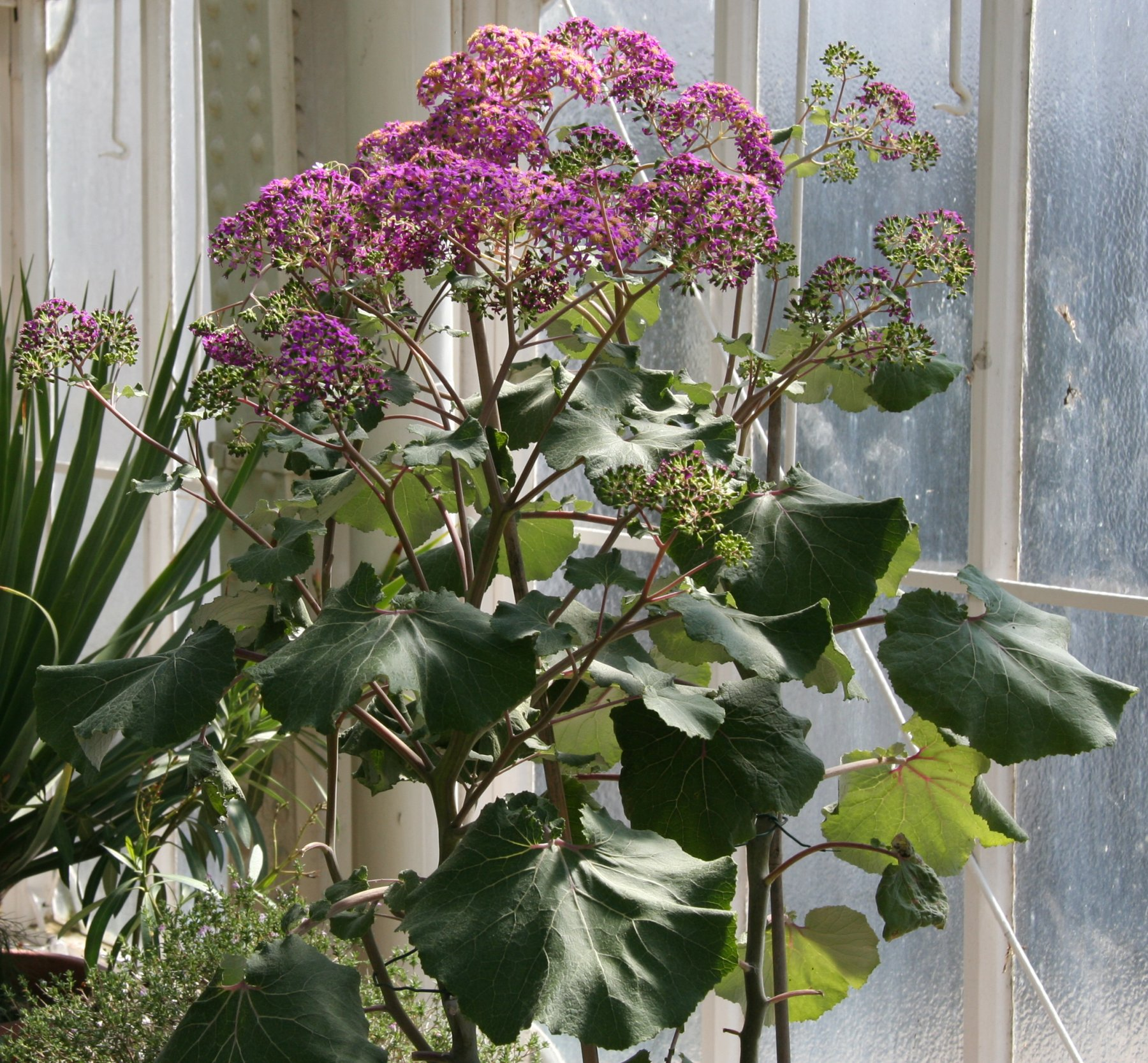

Conservation status
- Critically Endangered (IUCN 3.1)

Scientific classification
- Kingdom: Plantae
- Clade: Tracheophytes
- Clade: Angiosperms
- Clade: Eudicots
- Clade: Asterids
- Order: Asterales
- Family: Asteraceae
- Genus: Pericallis
- Species: P. malvifolia

Binomial name
- Pericallis malvifolia (L'Hér.) B.Nord.

= Pericallis malvifolia =

Species of flowering plant

Pericallis malvifolia is a species of flowering plant in the daisy family Asteraceae endemic to the Azores. It is found in coastal cliffs, ravines and interior of craters. In Santa Maria also on the side of roads and woods of Pittosporum undulatum. It appears from sea level to about 900 m (3,000 ft) altitude. It is present in Santa Maria, São Miguel, São Jorge, Pico and Faial.

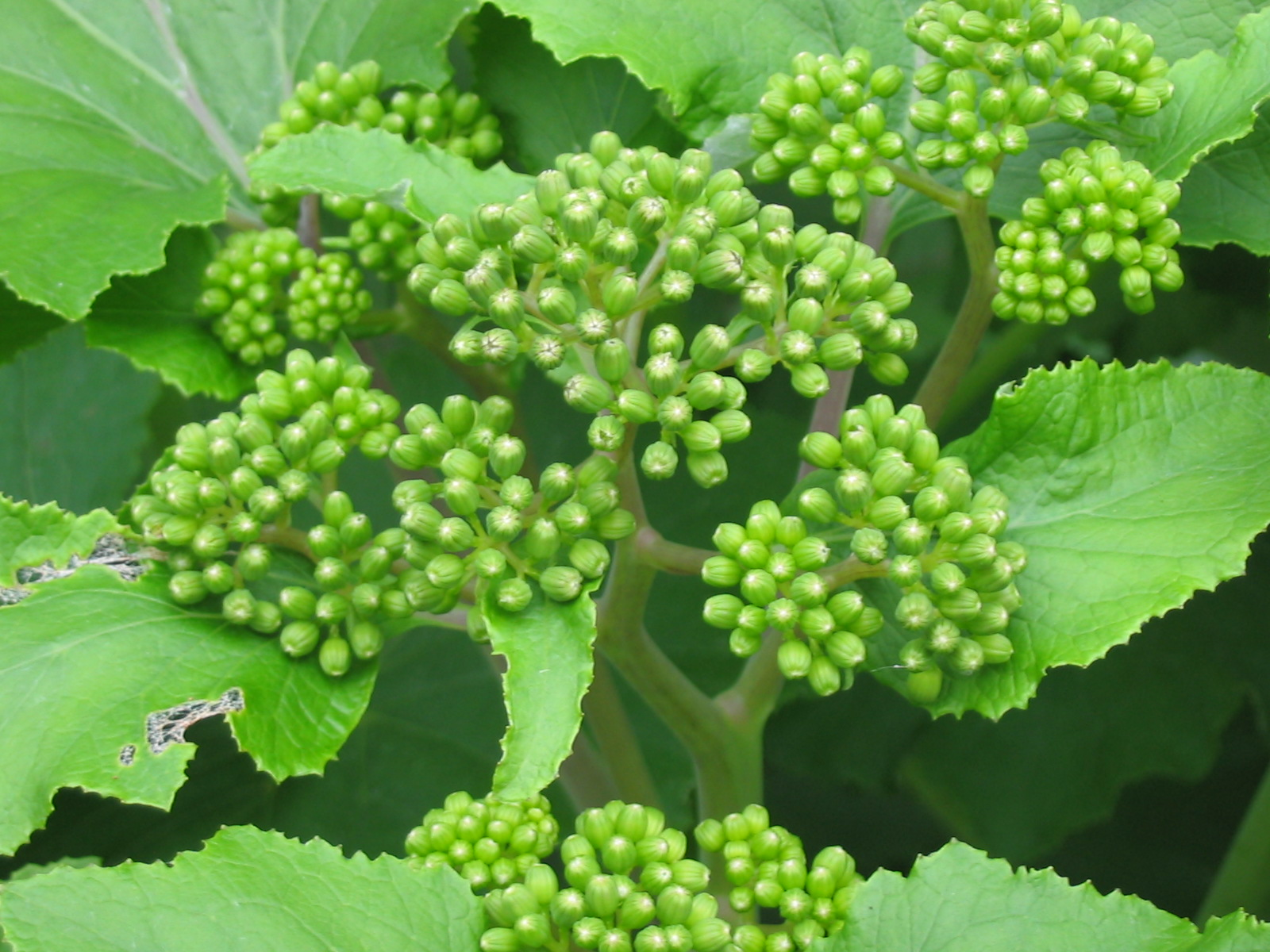
Buds

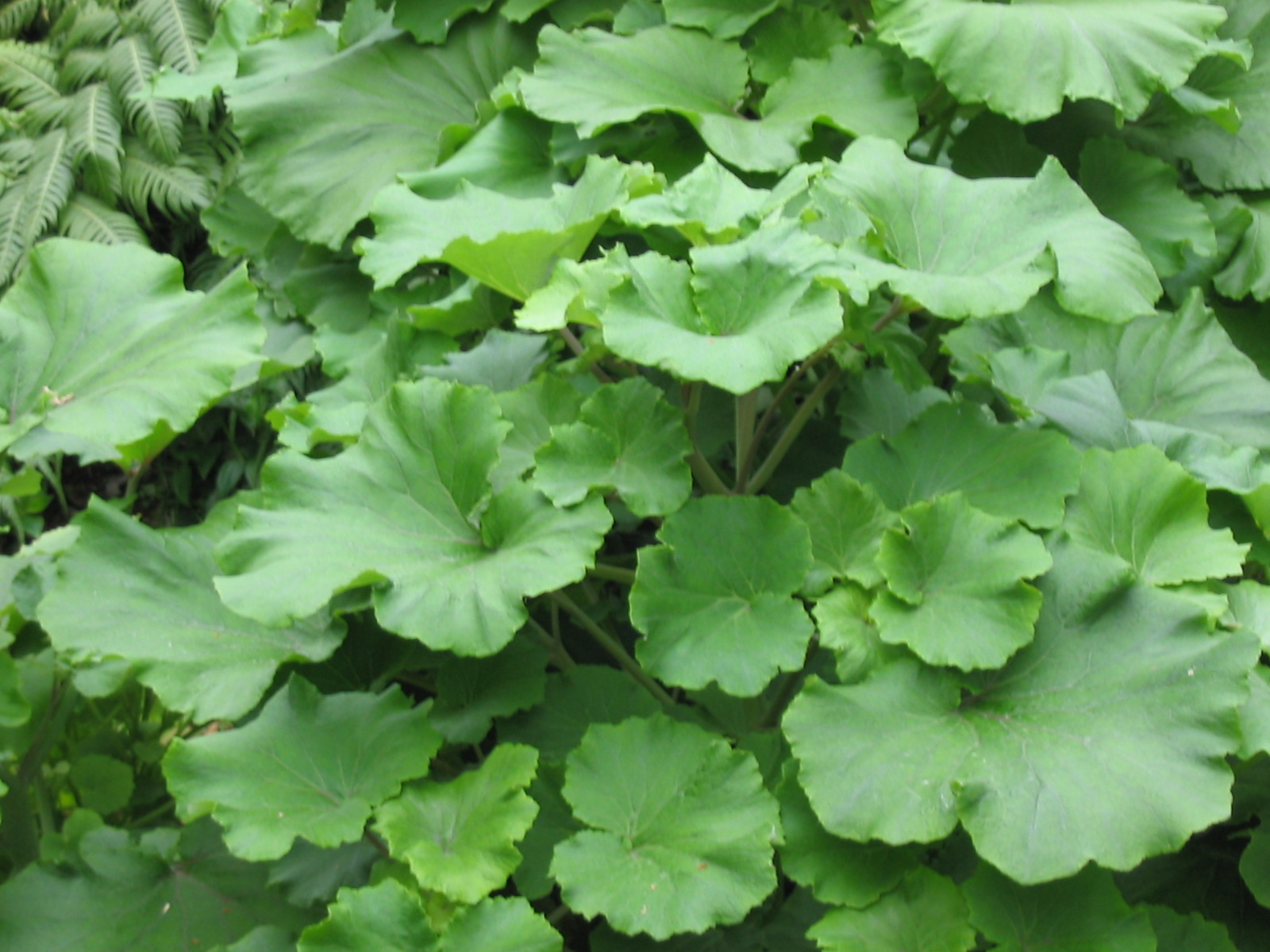
Leaves
