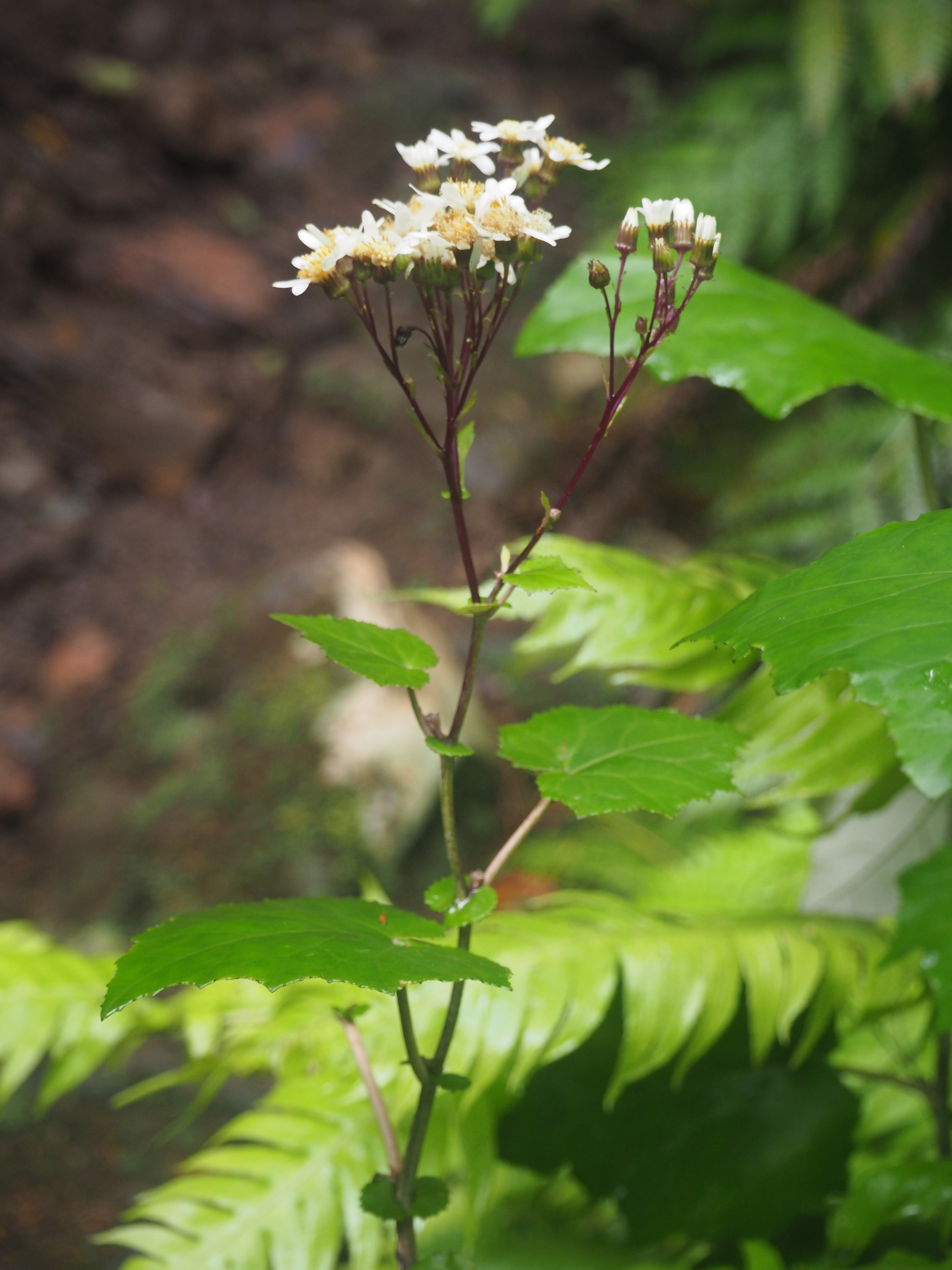

Scientific classification
- Kingdom: Plantae
- Clade: Tracheophytes
- Clade: Angiosperms
- Clade: Eudicots
- Clade: Asterids
- Order: Asterales
- Family: Asteraceae
- Genus: Pericallis
- Species: P. appendiculata

Binomial name
- Pericallis appendiculata (L. f.) B.Nord.

Synonyms
- Cacalia appendiculata L.f.; Cineraria appendiculata (L.f.) Poir.; Cineraria appendiculata Steud.; Cineraria lactea Willd.; Cineraria populifolia L'Hér.; Cineraria populifolia Lam.; Senecio appendiculatus (L.f.) Sch.Bip.; Senecio populifolius Burm. ex DC.

= Pericallis appendiculata =

Species of flowering plant

Pericallis appendiculata is a species of plants in the daisy family (Asteraceae). It is endemic to the Canary Islands.
