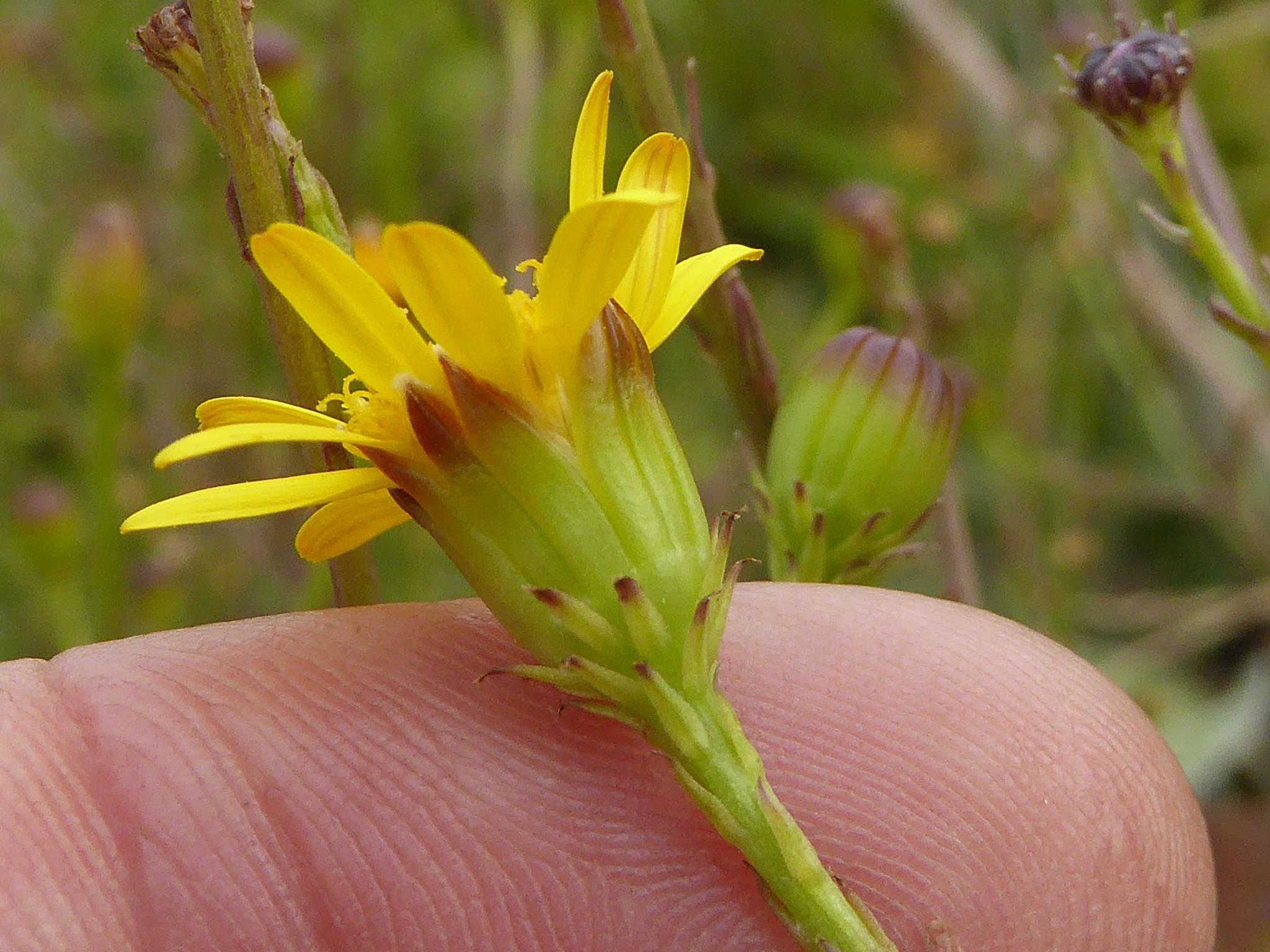

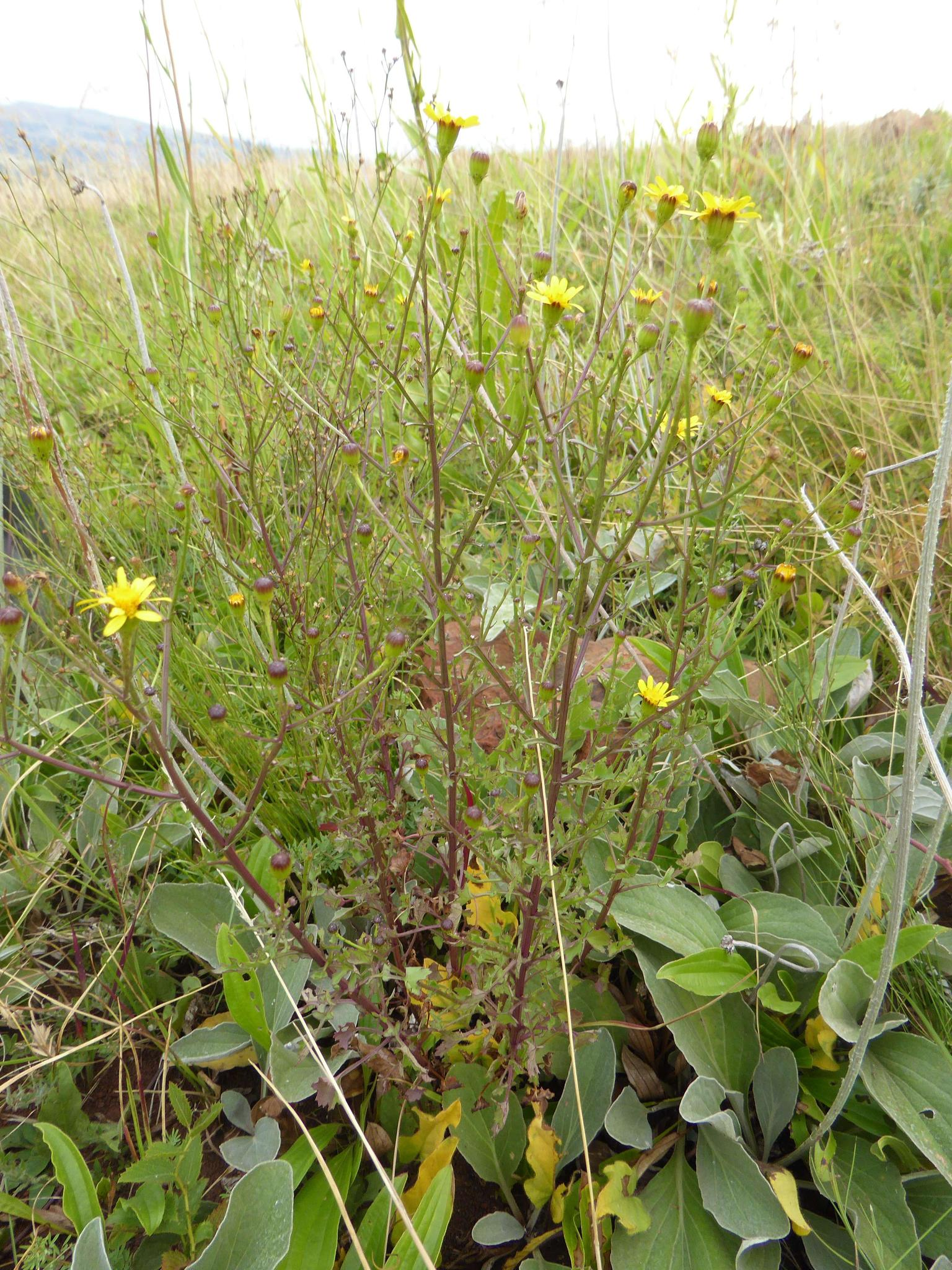

Conservation status
- Endangered (IUCN 3.1)

Scientific classification
- Kingdom: Plantae
- Clade: Tracheophytes
- Clade: Angiosperms
- Clade: Eudicots
- Clade: Asterids
- Order: Asterales
- Family: Asteraceae
- Genus: Cineraria
- Species: C. longipes

Binomial name
- Cineraria longipes S.Moore

= Cineraria longipes =

Species of flowering plant

Cineraria longipes is a species of flowering plant in the family Asteraceae. It is found only in the Northern Provinces and KwaZulu-Natal in South Africa. Its natural habitat is subtropical or tropical dry shrubland. It is threatened by habitat loss.

== Range and habitat ==
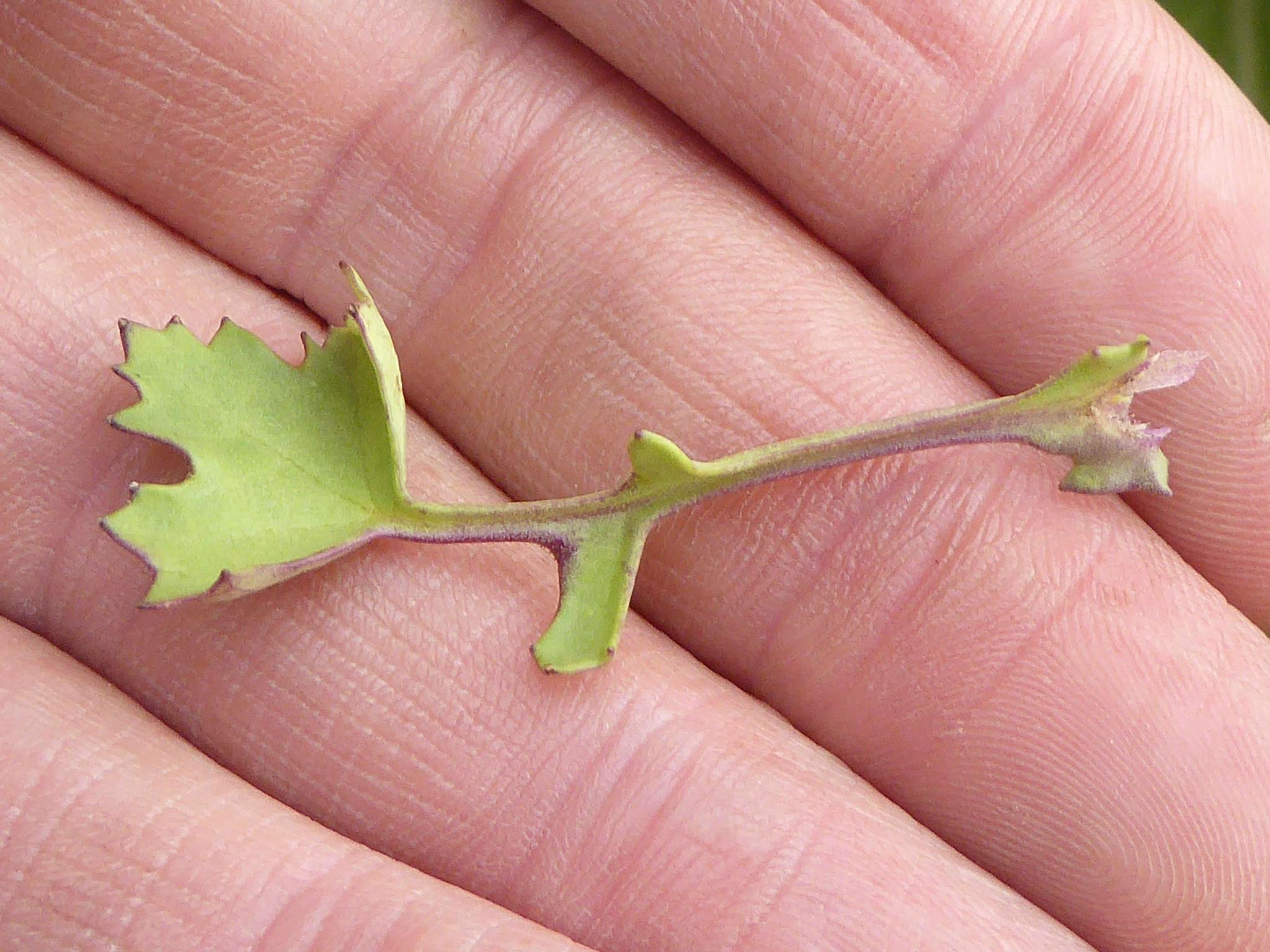
Cineraria longipes leaf

Cineraria longipes is found in six fragmented subpopulations from Klipriviersberg south to Suikerbosrand in southern Gauteng. It is found in Gold Reef Mountain Bushveld, Andesite Mountain Bushveld, and Soweto Highveld Grassland habitat on south-facing basalt koppies.

== Conservation status ==
As of 2009, Cineraria longipes has been classified as vulnerable in the Red List of South African Plants.
