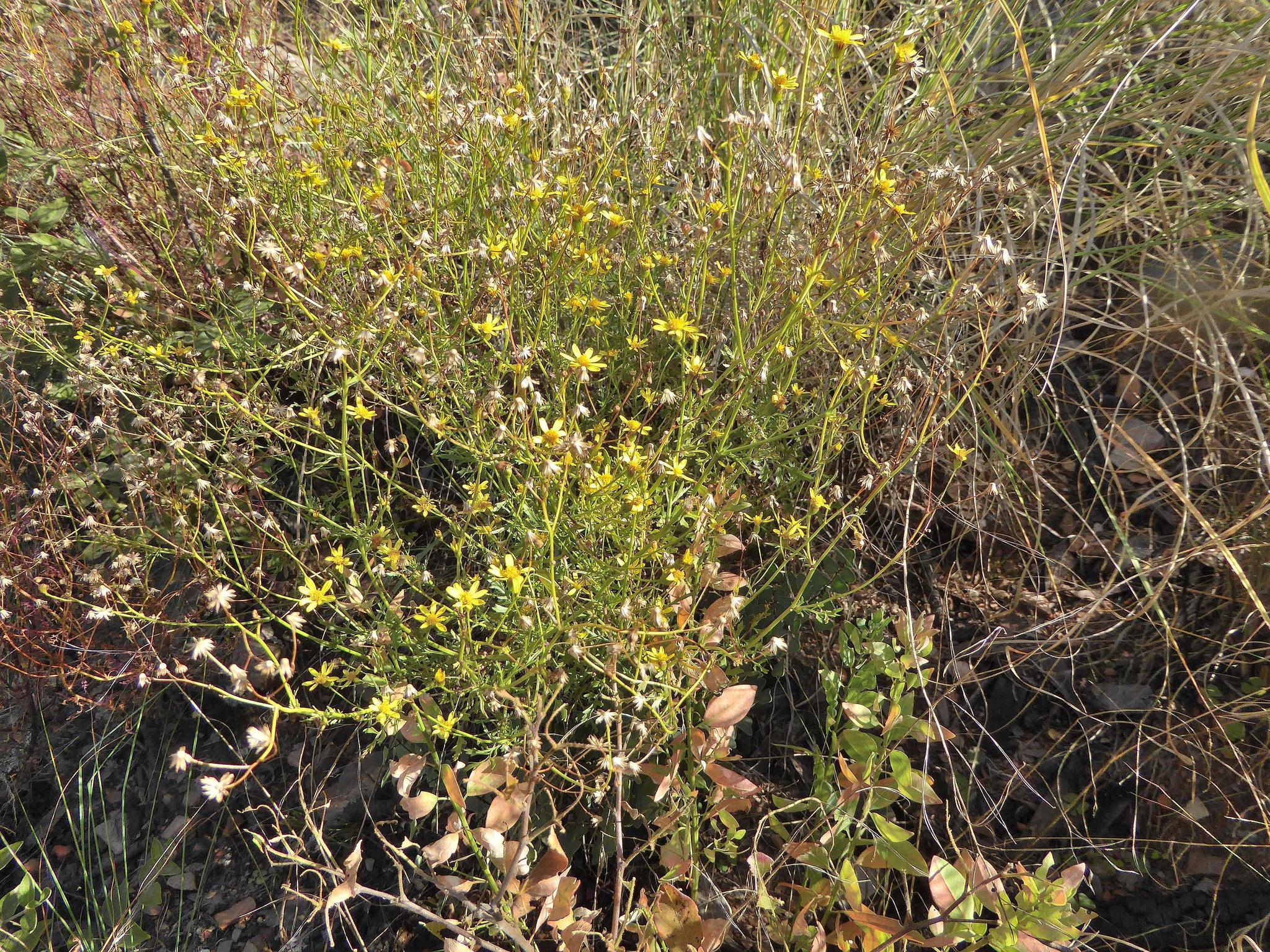

Scientific classification
- Kingdom: Plantae
- Clade: Tracheophytes
- Clade: Angiosperms
- Clade: Eudicots
- Clade: Asterids
- Order: Asterales
- Family: Asteraceae
- Genus: Cineraria
- Species: C. canescens

Binomial name
- Cineraria canescens J.C.Wendl. ex Link

Synonyms
- Cineraria aitoniana Biehler; Cineraria parviflora W.T.Aiton; Senecio aitonianus G.Don; Senecio momordicifolius Dinter & Muschl. ex Dinter

= Cineraria canescens =

Species of flowering plant

Cineraria canescens is a species of flowering plant in the family Asteraceae, native to southern Africa (Namibia and South Africa). It was first described in 1822.
