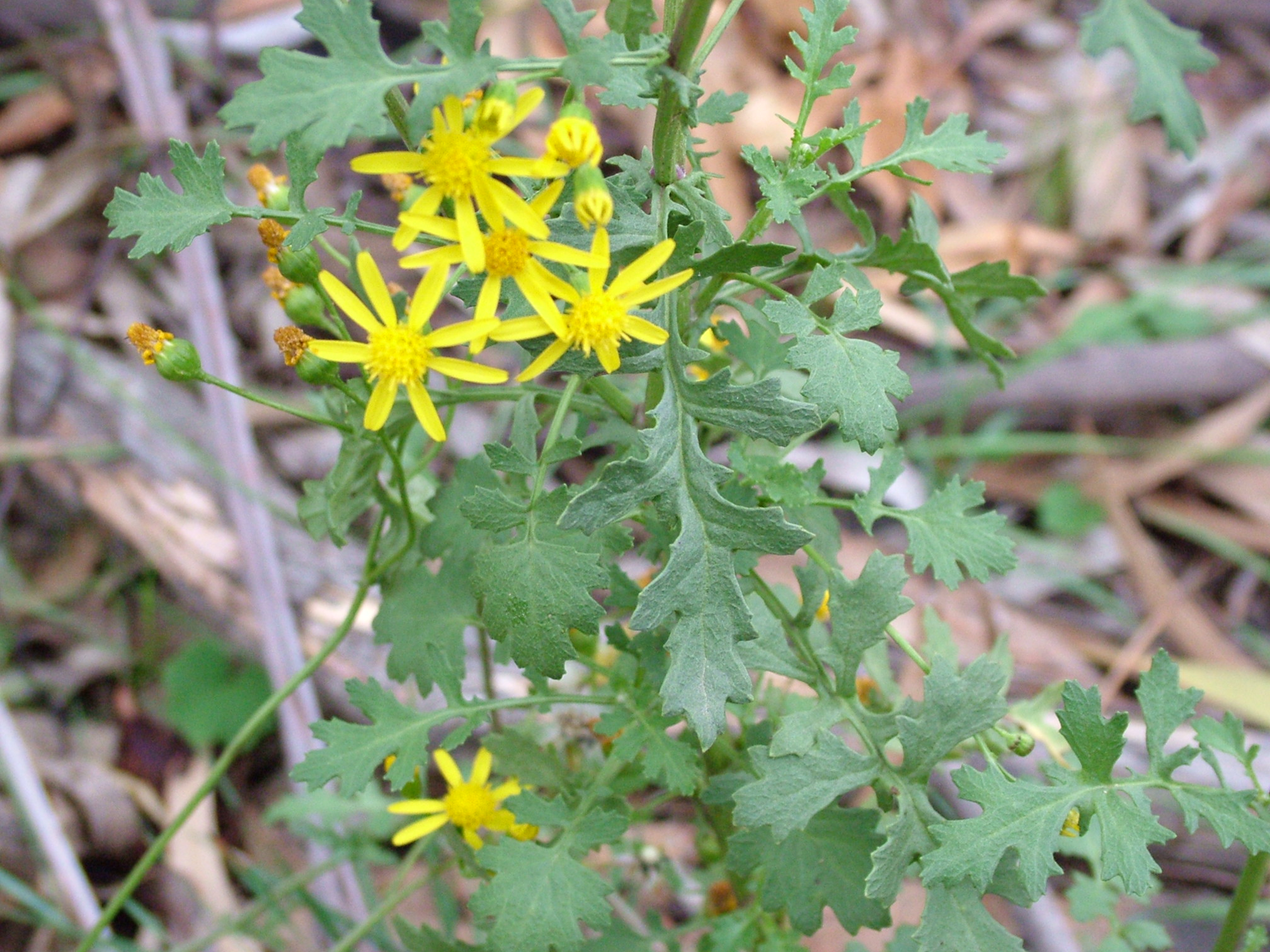

Scientific classification
- Kingdom: Plantae
- Clade: Tracheophytes
- Clade: Angiosperms
- Clade: Eudicots
- Clade: Asterids
- Order: Asterales
- Family: Asteraceae
- Genus: Cineraria
- Species: C. lyratiformis

Binomial name
- Cineraria lyratiformis Cron

Synonyms
- Cineraria lyrata DC. nom. illeg.

= Cineraria lyratiformis =

Species of flowering plant

Cineraria lyratiformis is a species of flowering plant in the family Asteraceae, native to in South Africa and Lesotho. It is a toxic plant that has been declared a noxious weed in New South Wales, Australia.
