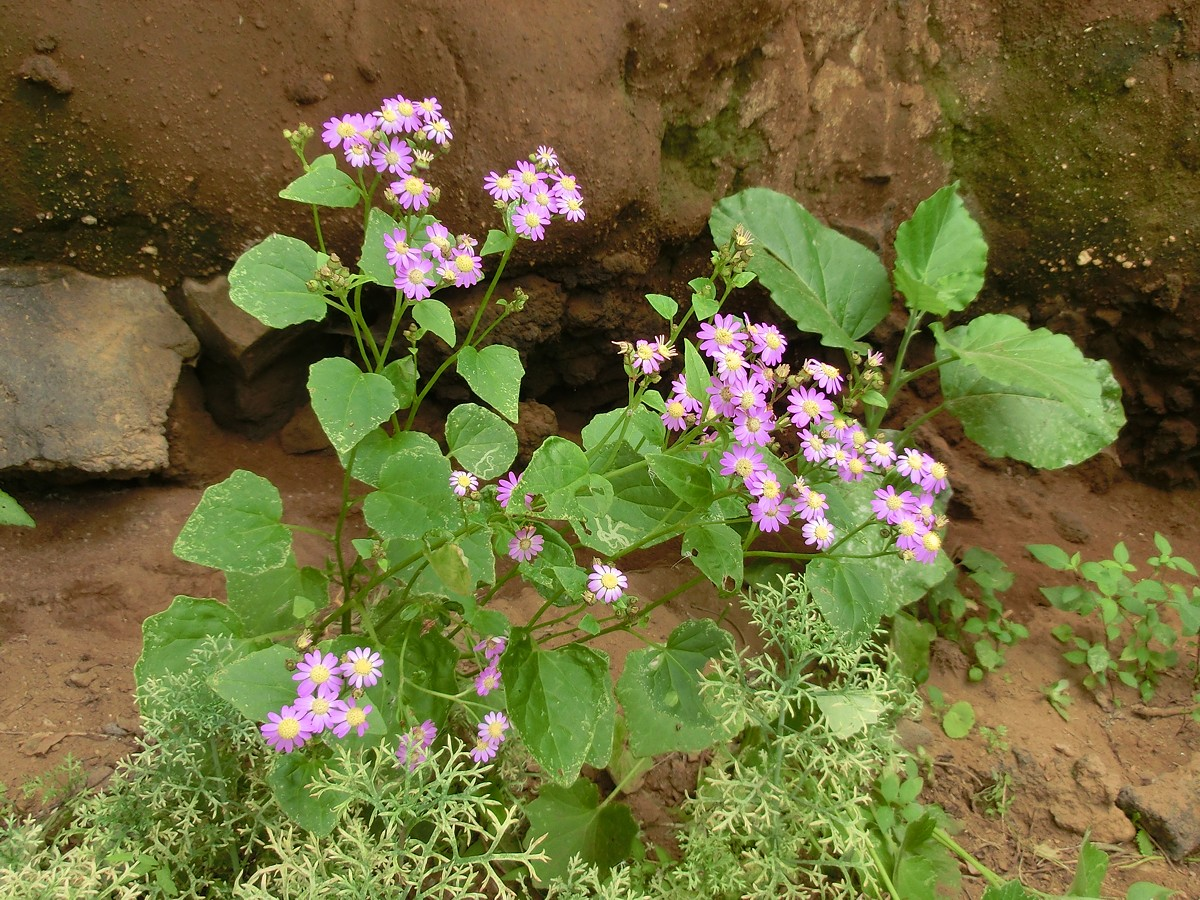

Scientific classification
- Kingdom: Plantae
- Clade: Tracheophytes
- Clade: Angiosperms
- Clade: Eudicots
- Clade: Asterids
- Order: Asterales
- Family: Asteraceae
- Genus: Pericallis
- Species: P. echinata

Binomial name
- Pericallis echinata (L.f.) B.Nord.

Synonyms
- Cacalia echinata L.f.; Cineraria bracteata C.Sm. ex Link; Cineraria ramentosa L'Hér.; Doronicum echinatum (L.f.) Sch.Bip.; Senecio echinatus (L.f.) DC.

= Pericallis echinata =

Species of flowering plant

Pericallis echinata is a species of flowering plant in the family Asteraceae. It is native to Tenerife in the Canary Islands.

== Description ==
Pericallis echinata is an upright herbaceous perennial plant, growing to 30–50 cm (12–20 in). The leaves are rounded in shape, with toothed margins. The inflorescence is composed of 5–15 heads of flowers, each about 2–5 cm (0.79–1.97 in) across, with 11–14 pink ray florets.

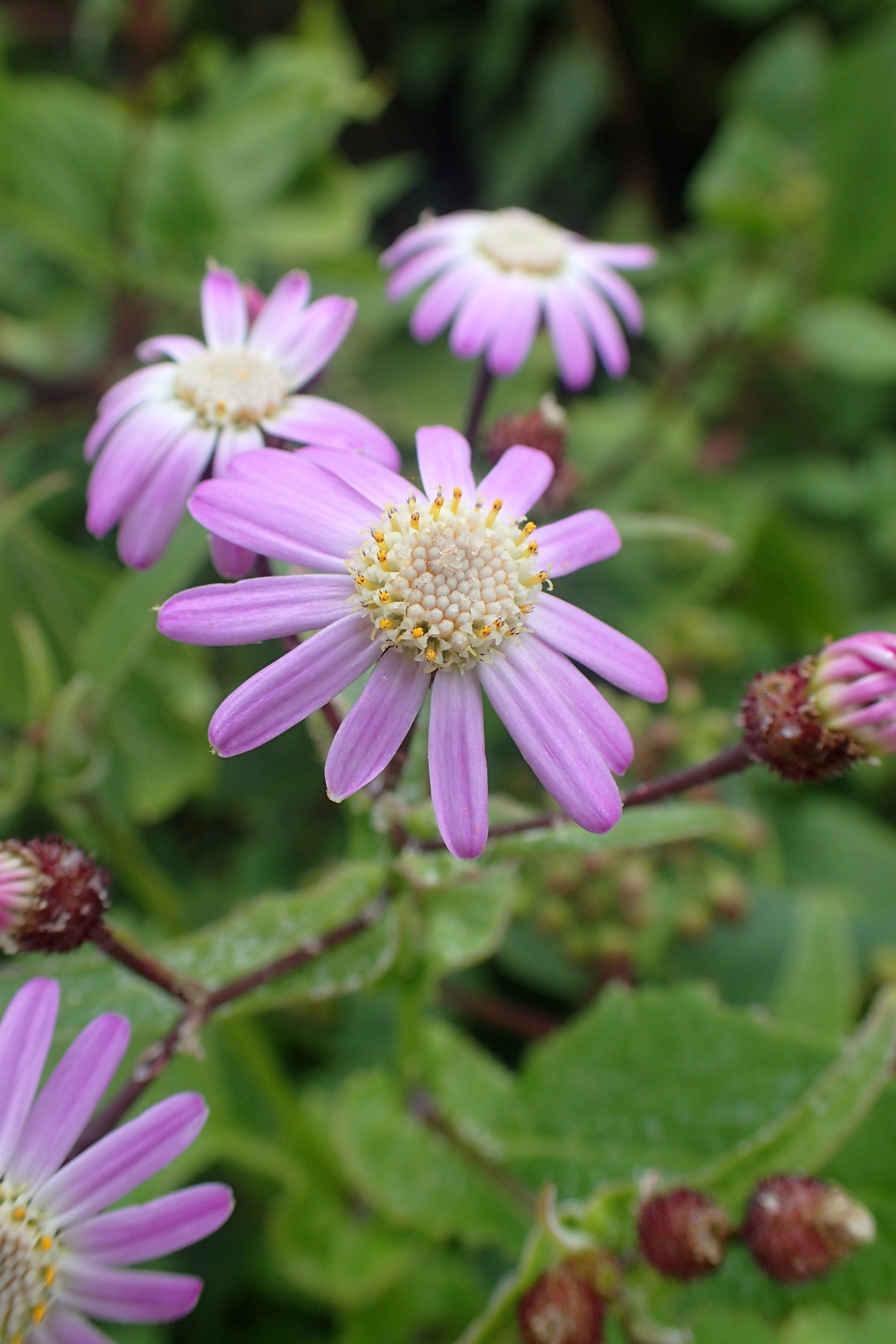
Flowers

== Distribution and habitat ==
Pericallis echinata is endemic to the Canary Islands. It is found in the north-west of Tenerife. On the north coast, large numbers of plants may be found locally in Cistus scrub and on rocky slopes. It is found much less often in the south of the island.
