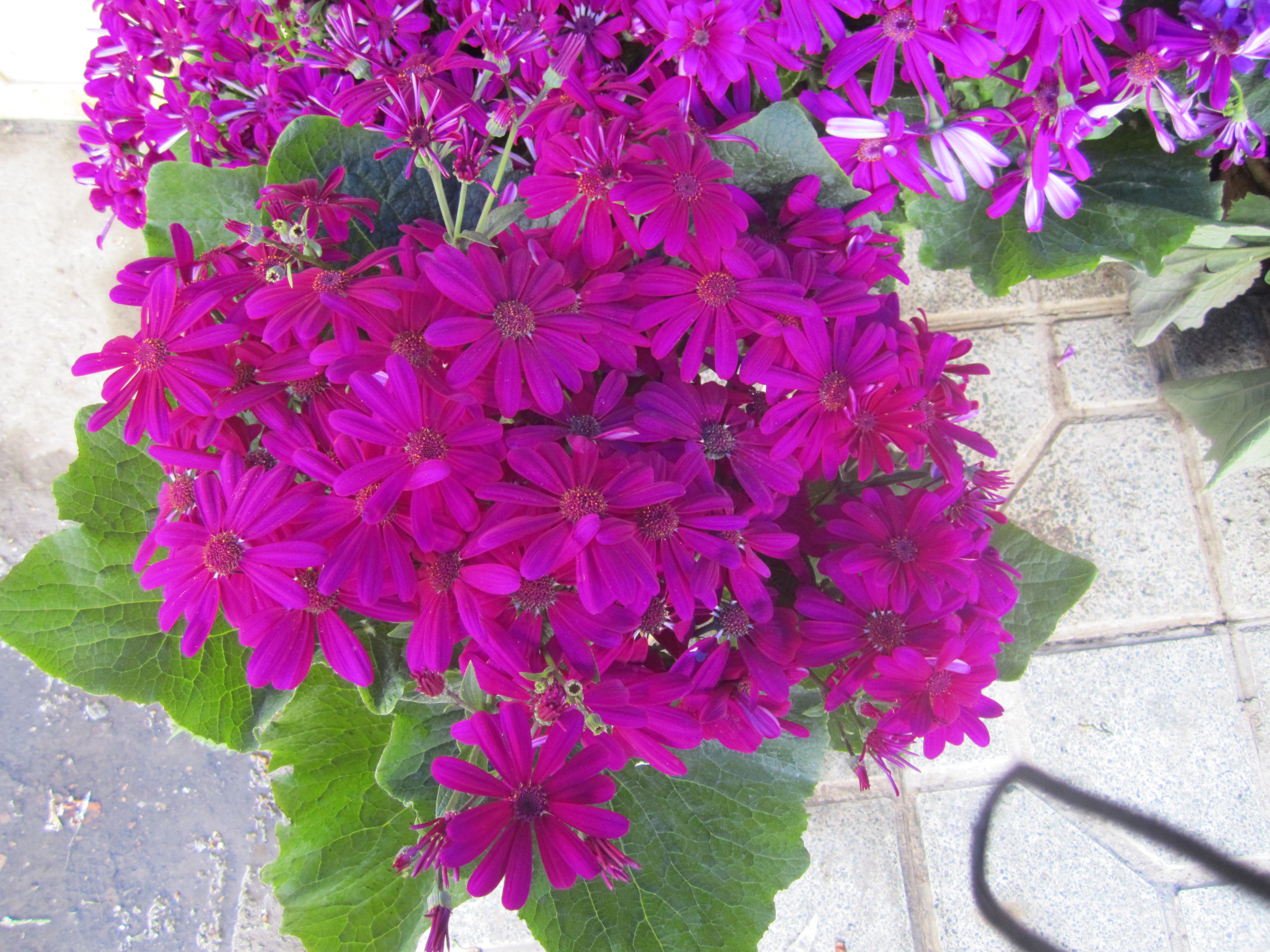
- Cineraria deltoidea

Scientific classification
- Kingdom: Plantae
- Clade: Tracheophytes
- Clade: Angiosperms
- Clade: Eudicots
- Clade: Asterids
- Order: Asterales
- Family: Asteraceae
- Genus: Cineraria
- Species: C. deltoidea

Binomial name
- Cineraria deltoidea Sond.

Synonyms
- Cineraria bequaertii De Wild. Cineraria bracteosa O.Hoffm. ex Engl. Cineraria buchananii S.Moore; Cineraria densiflora R.E.Fr. Cineraria grandiflora Vatke; Cineraria kilimandscharica Engl. Cineraria laxiflora R.E.Fr. Cineraria monticola Hutch. Cineraria prittwitzii O.Hoffm. ex Engl. Senecio kirschsteineanus Muschl. Senecio schubotzianus Muschl.

= Cineraria deltoidea =

Species of flowering plant

Cineraria deltoidea is a perennial flowering plant of the family Asteraceae and the genus Cineraria which is also the closest known relative of the giant Dendrosenecio of East Africa.

== Description ==
Sometimes growing straight upwards but usually more sprawled or trailing, Cineraria deltoidea can achieve heights of 16 to 60 centimeters (6.3 to 23.6 inches) or 15 to 300 centimeters (5.9 to 118.1 inches).

Stems and leaves
Branched stems often purplish, covered with tufts to dense mats of woolly hairs which are thin and cobweb-like or short and soft. The leaves are attached to the stem with leaf stalks except for the leaves at the top. The leaf shape can be egg shaped (wider than it is long) or "narrowly triangular". 1 to 7 centimeters long and 1 to 10 centimeters wide, the base is heart-shaped or seems cut off at the tip or is "interrupted by a notch". Five to eleven lobes, sometimes with teeth on the tips. Leaves are green and hairless except for the main veins or sometimes with tufts of soft hairs on the underside, which might fall off seasonally. The leaf stalk, 1 to 6 centimeters long, often is narrowly winged and occasionally has one to four small oblong lobes.

Flowers
Flower heads can be held straight up or sometimes droopy from their stalks and rarely appear alone, more often appearing together in large quantities forming flat-topped inflorescence in which the central flower opens first. Flower heads each with a cylindrical ring of eight to fourteen pale green with brown to reddish brown tipped bracts, sometimes with hairs but most often without and two to eight bracts simulating a calyx. Four to fourteen golden yellow to lemon yellow ray florets and with yellow disc florets.

Fruits
Dark colored achenes, less than 4 millimeters long; pappus is 3 to 6 millimeters long.

== Distribution ==
Cineraria deltoidea is found between the altitudes of 200 to 1,650 meters (660 to 5,410 ft) and is widespread throughout the mountains of the East African Rift, including the high plateau regions of Malawi and the eastern highlands of Zimbabwe.
