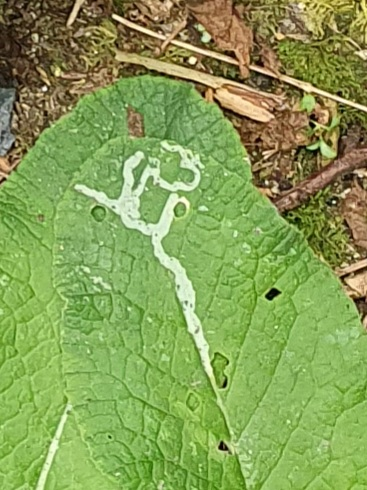

Scientific classification
- Kingdom: Animalia
- Phylum: Arthropoda
- Clade: Pancrustacea
- Class: Insecta
- Order: Diptera
- Family: Agromyzidae
- Genus: Chromatomyia
- Species: C. primulae

Binomial name
- Chromatomyia primulae (Robineau-Desvoidy, 1851)

= Chromatomyia primulae =

Species of fly

Chromatomyia primulae is a species of leaf-mining fly in the family Agromyzidae, of the order Diptera. The larvae mine the leaves of Primula species. The fly was described by the French physician and entomologist, Jean-Baptiste Robineau-Desvoidy in 1851 and is found in Europe.

== Life history ==
Mines are white, long and narrow, with the frass in widely spaced black lumps. Larvae can be found in June and August-September. Mines have been recorded in the following plants: Primula bullesiana, oxlip (Primula elatior), Primula uralensis, cowslip (Primula veris) and primrose (Primula vulgaris). Pupation is within the mine, next to a vein with the anterior spiracles projecting through the epidermis. Adults fly in July
