= Chromatomyia =

Scientific classification
- Domain: Eukaryota
- Kingdom: Animalia
- Phylum: Arthropoda
- Class: Insecta
- Order: Diptera
- Family: Agromyzidae
- Subfamily: Phytomyzinae
- Genus: Chromatomyia; Hardy, 1849

Genus of flies

Chromatomyia is a genus of flies belonging to the family Agromyzidae.

The genus has a cosmopolitan distribution.

== Species ==
Species:

- Chromatomyia actinidiae Sasakawa, 1998
- Chromatomyia aizoon Hering, 1932
- Chromatomyia alopecuri Griffiths, 1980
- Chromatomyia alpigenae
- Chromatomyia aprilina
- Chromatomyia aragonensis
- Chromatomyia asteris
- Chromatomyia beigerae
- Chromatomyia blackstoniae
- Chromatomyia centaurii
- Chromatomyia ciliata
- Chromatomyia dorsata
- Chromatomyia farfarella
- Chromatomyia furcata
- Chromatomyia fuscula
- Chromatomyia gentianae
- Chromatomyia gentianella
- Chromatomyia gentii
- Chromatomyia glacialis
- Chromatomyia griffithsiana
- Chromatomyia hoppiella
- Chromatomyia horticola
- Chromatomyia isicae
- Chromatomyia lindbergi
- Chromatomyia linnaeae
- Chromatomyia lonicerae
- Chromatomyia luzulae
- Chromatomyia milii
- Chromatomyia nervi
- Chromatomyia nigra
- Chromatomyia norwegica
- Chromatomyia obscuriceps
- Chromatomyia ochracea
- Chromatomyia opacella
- Chromatomyia paraciliata
- Chromatomyia periclymeni
- Chromatomyia primulae
- Chromatomyia pseudogentii
- Chromatomyia pseudomilii
- Chromatomyia ramosa
- Chromatomyia rhaetica
- Chromatomyia saxifragae
- Chromatomyia scabiosae
- Chromatomyia scabiosarum
- Chromatomyia scabiosella
- Chromatomyia scolopendri
- Chromatomyia skuratowiczi
- Chromatomyia soldanellae
- Chromatomyia spenceriana
- Chromatomyia styriaca
- Chromatomyia succisae
- Chromatomyia swertiae
- Chromatomyia syngenesiae
- Chromatomyia tschirnhausi
- Chromatomyia vernalis
