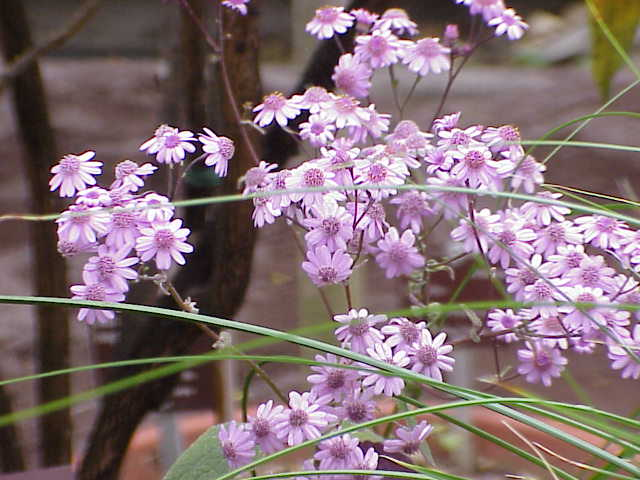
- Pericallis cruenta

Scientific classification
- Kingdom: Plantae
- Clade: Embryophytes
- Clade: Tracheophytes
- Clade: Angiosperms
- Clade: Eudicots
- Clade: Asterids
- Order: Asterales
- Family: Asteraceae
- Subfamily: Asteroideae
- Tribe: Senecioneae
- Genus: Pericallis; D.Don

= Pericallis =

Genus of flowering plants in the daisy family

Pericallis is a small genus of 15 species of flowering plants in the family Asteraceae, native to the Canary Islands, Madeira and Azores. The genus includes herbaceous plants and small subshrubs. In the past, the genus was often included in either Cineraria or Senecio.

The florist's cineraria (Pericallis × hybrida) is a hybrid between P. cruenta and P. lanata.

== Species ==
Species include:

- Pericallis appendiculata (L.f.) B.Nord.
- Pericallis aurita (L'Hér.) B.Nord.
- Pericallis cruenta (L'Hér.) Bolle
- Pericallis echinata (L.f.) B.Nord.
- Pericallis hadrosoma (Svent.) B.Nord.
- Pericallis hansenii (G.Kunkel) Sunding
- Pericallis lanata (L'Hér.) B.Nord.
- Pericallis malvifolia (L'Hér.) B.Nord.
- Pericallis menezesii R. Jardim, K. E. Jones, Carine & M. Seq.
- Pericallis multiflora (L'Hér.) B.Nord.
- Pericallis murrayi (Bornm.) B.Nord.
- Pericallis papyracea (DC.) B.Nord.
- Pericallis steetzii (Bolle) B.Nord.
- Pericallis tussilaginis (L'Hér.) D.Don
- Pericallis webbii (Sch. Bip.) Bolle
