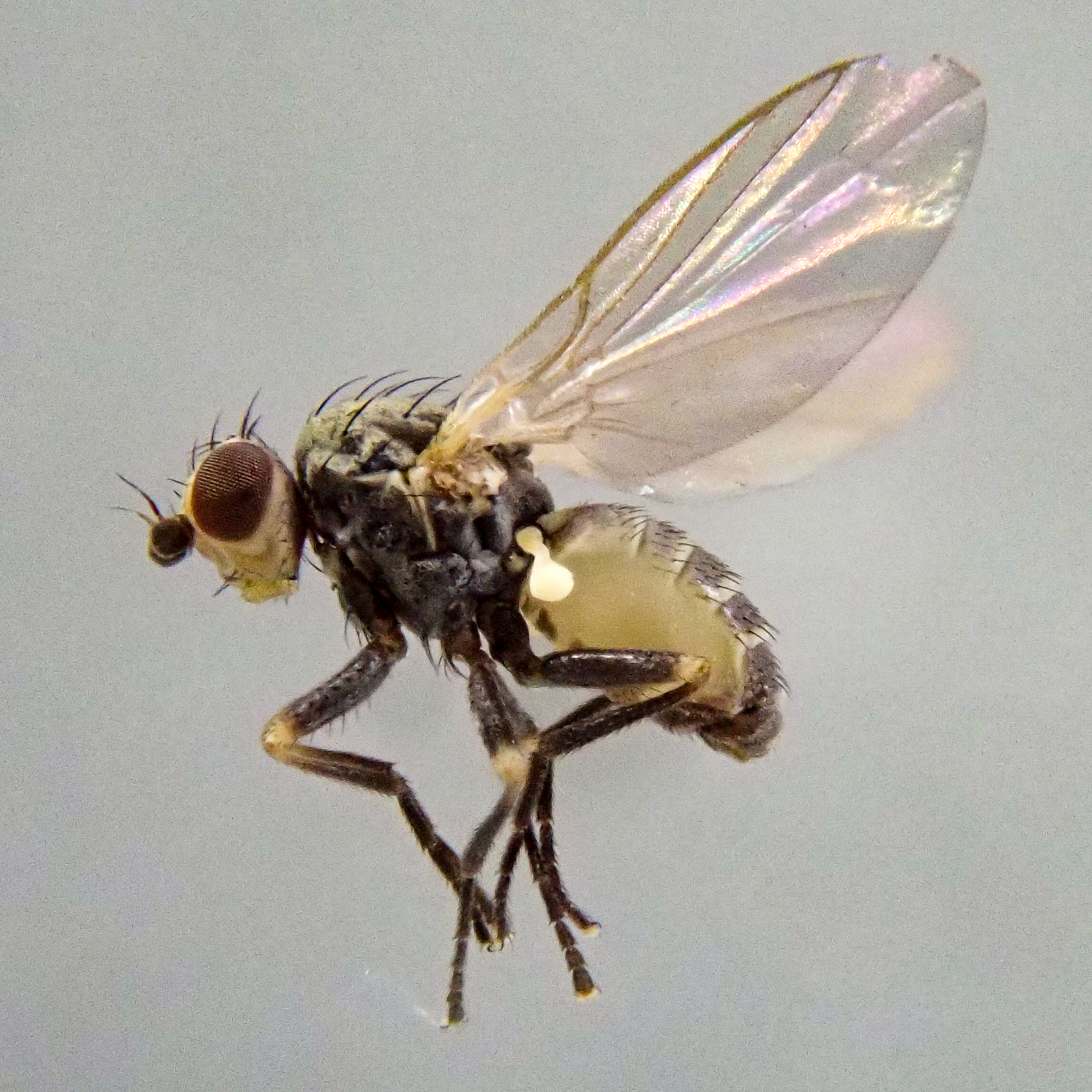

Scientific classification
- Kingdom: Animalia
- Phylum: Arthropoda
- Class: Insecta
- Order: Diptera
- Family: Agromyzidae
- Genus: Chromatomyia
- Species: C. syngenesiae

Binomial name
- Chromatomyia syngenesiae (Hardy, 1849)

Synonyms
- Phytomyza syngenesiae (Hardy, 1849)

= Chromatomyia syngenesiae =

Species of fly

Chromatomyia syngenesiae, the ragwort leaf miner or chrysanthemum leaf miner, also known by the synonym Phytomyza syngenesiae, is a Palaearctic fly, also present in Australia and New Zealand, with larvae that make leaf mines in Senecio species and other related herbaceous daisies.
