= Austrosynotis =

Scientific classification
- Kingdom: Plantae
- Clade: Embryophytes
- Clade: Tracheophytes
- Clade: Angiosperms
- Clade: Eudicots
- Clade: Asterids
- Order: Asterales
- Family: Asteraceae
- Subfamily: Asteroideae
- Tribe: Senecioneae
- Genus: Austrosynotis; C.Jeffrey
- Species: A. rectirama

Binomial name
- Austrosynotis rectirama (Baker) C.Jeffrey

Synonyms
- Senecio rectiramus Baker

Genus of flowering plants

Austrosynotis is a genus of flowering plants in the daisy family.

There is only one known species, Austrosynotis rectirama, native to Malawi and Tanzania.
