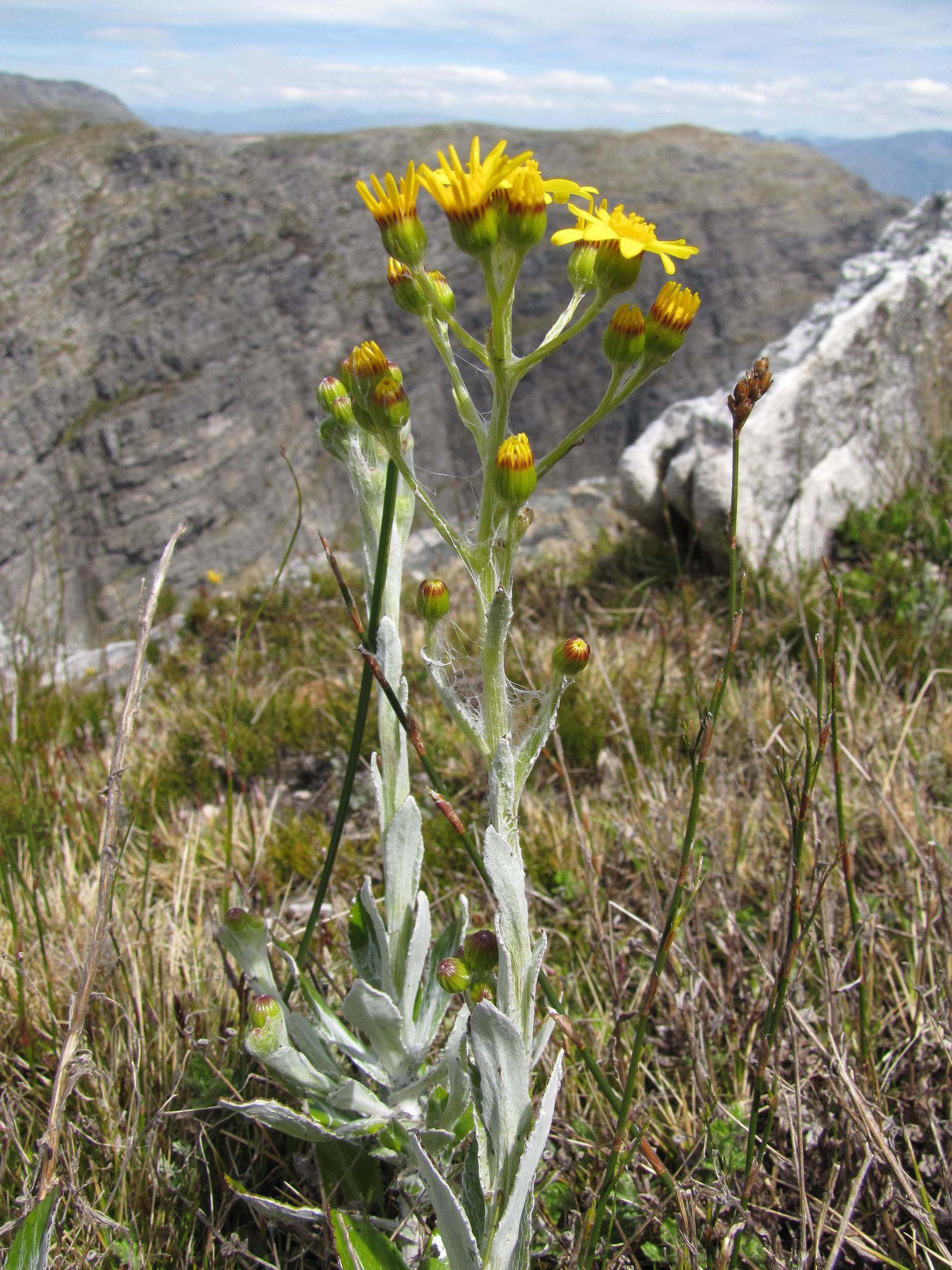

Scientific classification
- Kingdom: Plantae
- Clade: Tracheophytes
- Clade: Angiosperms
- Clade: Eudicots
- Clade: Asterids
- Order: Asterales
- Family: Asteraceae
- Subfamily: Asteroideae
- Tribe: Senecioneae
- Genus: Oresbia; Cron & B.Nord.
- Species: O. heterocarpa

Binomial name
- Oresbia heterocarpa Cron & B.Nord. (2006)

Synonyms
- Cineraria tomentosa Less. Senecio lantus L.f.

= Oresbia =

Genus of flowering plants

Oresbia heterocarpa is the perennial plant that is the only species in the South African native genus Oresbia and member of the tribe Senecioneae in the family Asteraceae.

== Description ==
Leaves are without petiole and directly attached to the stem, smooth margins and with thick hair underneath. Having more than one form of flower starting with a four-winged ray floret which matures into a one-seeded, one-celled, fruits which remain closed at maturity; an achene with the calyx tube remaining attached.
