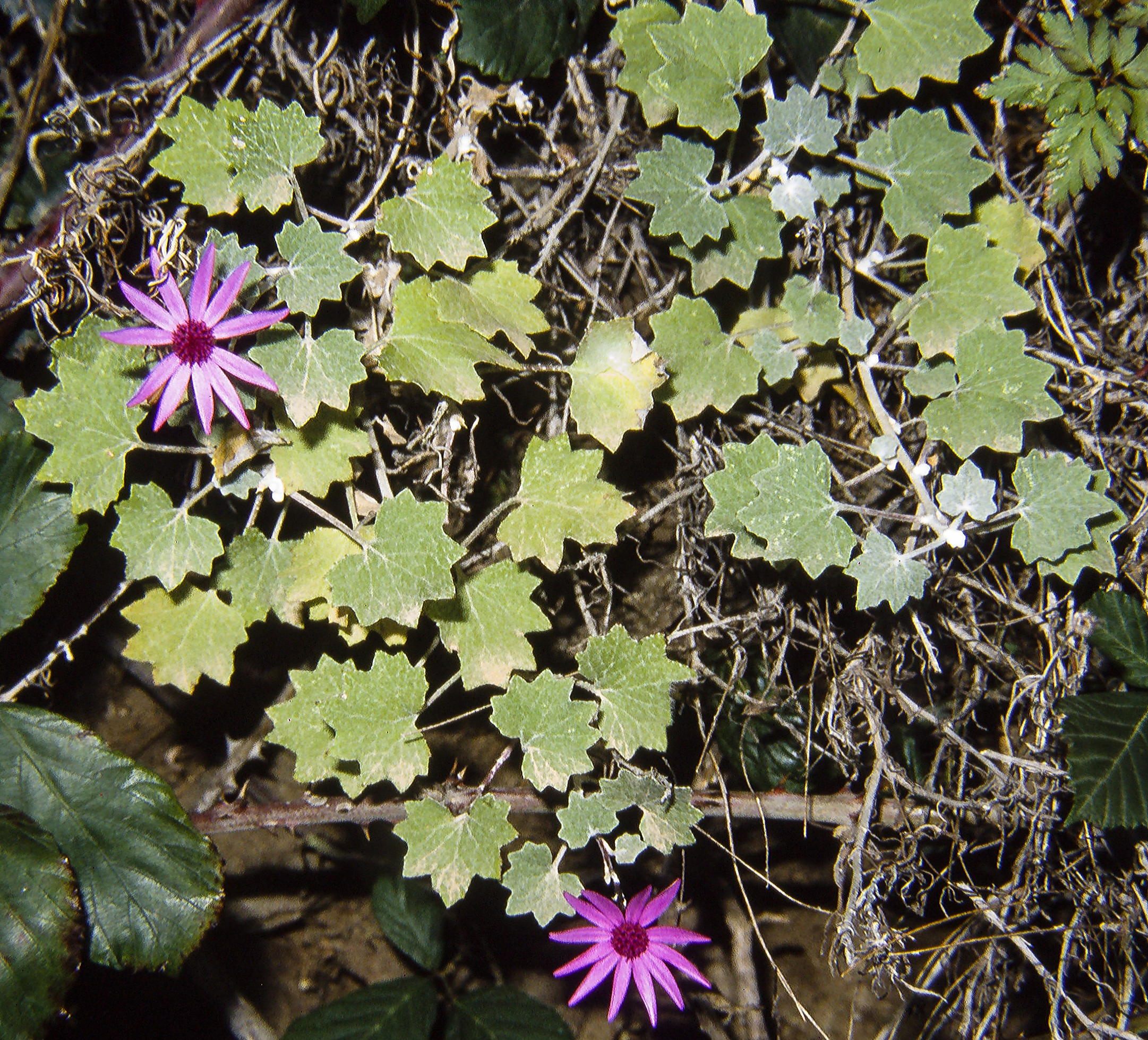
- In habitat, Masca, Tenerife

Scientific classification
- Kingdom: Plantae
- Clade: Tracheophytes
- Clade: Angiosperms
- Clade: Eudicots
- Clade: Asterids
- Order: Asterales
- Family: Asteraceae
- Genus: Pericallis
- Species: P. lanata

Binomial name
- Pericallis lanata (L'Hér.) B.Nord.

Synonyms
- Cineraria aurito Auct.; Cineraria lanata Lam.; Cineraria lanata L'Hér.; Senecio heritieri DC.

= Pericallis lanata =

Species of flowering plant

Pericallis lanata is a species of flowering plant in the family Asteraceae. It is endemic to the Canary Islands.

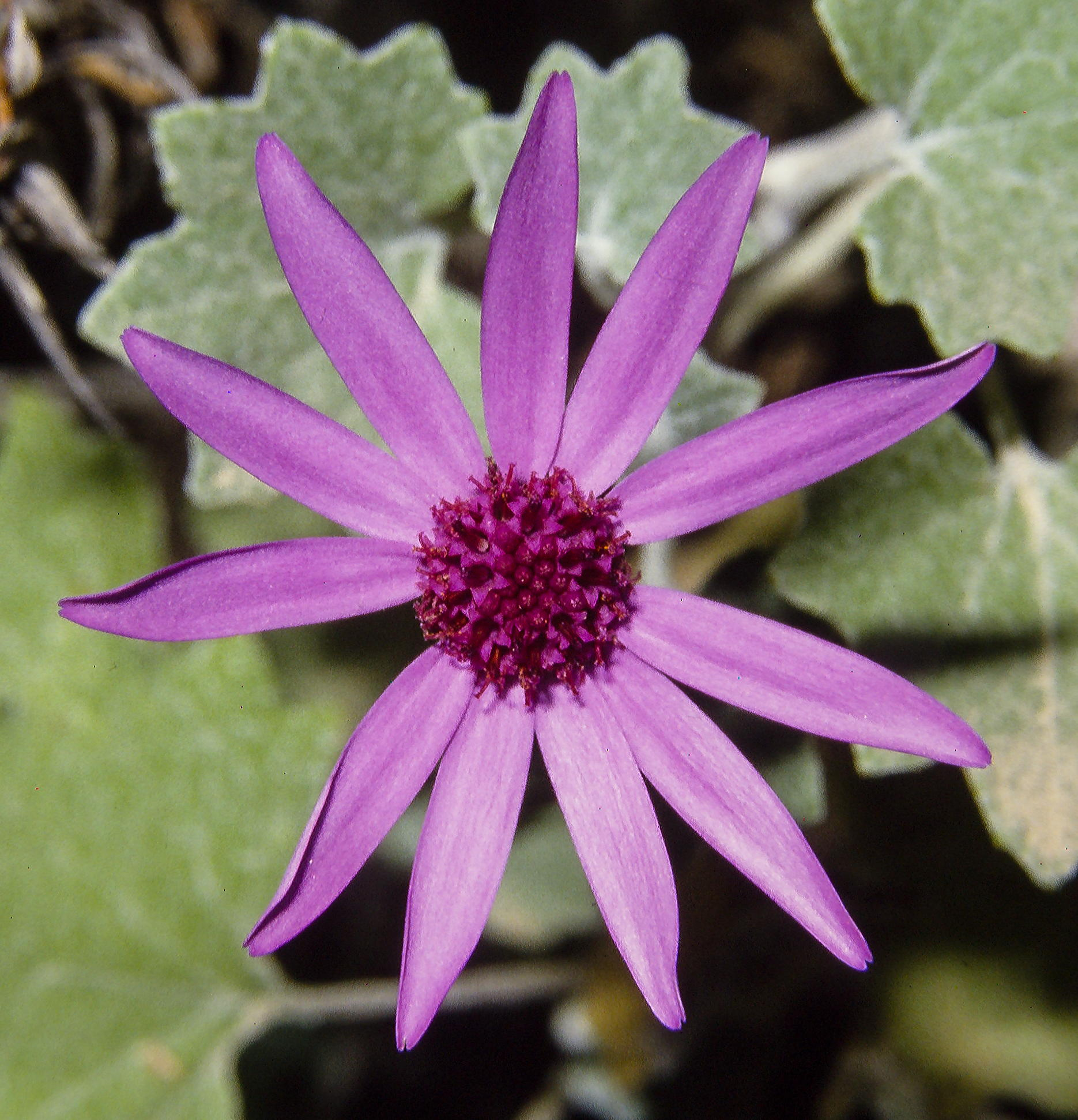
Flower head
