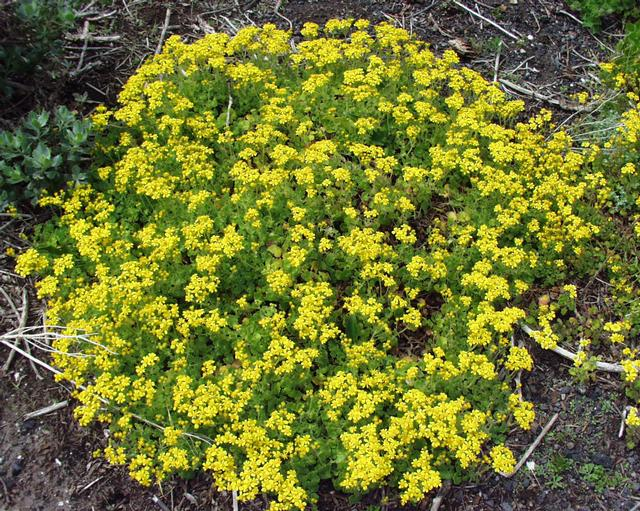
- Cineraria geifolia

Scientific classification
- Kingdom: Plantae
- Clade: Tracheophytes
- Clade: Angiosperms
- Clade: Eudicots
- Clade: Asterids
- Order: Asterales
- Family: Asteraceae
- Subfamily: Asteroideae
- Tribe: Senecioneae
- Genus: Cineraria; L.

Type species
- C. geifolia L.

Synonyms
- Xenocarpus Cass.

= Cineraria =

Genus of flowering plants

Cineraria is a genus of flowering plants in the sunflower family, native primarily to southern Africa with a few species further north. The genus includes herbaceous plants and small subshrubs.

In the past, the genus was commonly viewed in a broader sense including a number of species from the Canary Islands and Madeira which are now transferred to the genus Pericallis, including the florist's cineraria (Pericallis × hybrida).

== Species ==
As of June 2021, Plants of the World Online accepts the following species:

- Cineraria abyssinica Sch.Bip. ex A.Rich.
- Cineraria albicans N.E.Br.
- Cineraria albomontana Hilliard
- Cineraria alchemilloides DC.
- Cineraria anampoza (Baker) Baker
- Cineraria arctotidea DC.
- Cineraria aspera Thunb.
- Cineraria atriplicifolia DC.
- Cineraria austrotransvaalensis Cron
- Cineraria britteniae Hutch. & R.A.Dyer
- Cineraria burkei Burtt Davy
- Cineraria canescens Wendl.Obs. ex Link
- Cineraria cyanomontana Cron
- Cineraria decipiens Harv.
- Cineraria deltoidea Sond.
- Cineraria densiflora R.E.Fr.
- Cineraria dieterlenii E.Phillips
- Cineraria dryogeton Cron
- Cineraria erodioides DC.
- Cineraria erosa Harv.
- Cineraria exilis DC.
- Cineraria geifolia (L.) L.
- Cineraria geraniifolia DC.
- Cineraria glandulosa Cron
- Cineraria grandibracteata Hilliard
- Cineraria huilensis Cron
- Cineraria humifusa L'Hér.
- Cineraria laxiflora R.E.Fr.
- Cineraria lobata L'Hér.
- Cineraria longipes S.Moore
- Cineraria lyratiformis Cron
- Cineraria magnicephala Cron
- Cineraria mazoensis S.Moore
- Cineraria microglossa DC.
- Cineraria mitellifolia L'Hér.
- Cineraria mollis E.Mey. ex DC.
- Cineraria ngwenyensis Cron
- Cineraria parvifolia Burtt Davy
- Cineraria pinnata O.Hoffm. ex Schinz
- Cineraria platycarpa DC.
- Cineraria polycephala DC.
- Cineraria pulchra Cron
- Cineraria saxifraga DC.
- Cineraria sebaldii Cufod.
- Cineraria tomentolanata Govaerts
- Cineraria vagans Hilliard
- Cineraria vallis-pacis Dinter ex Merxm.
