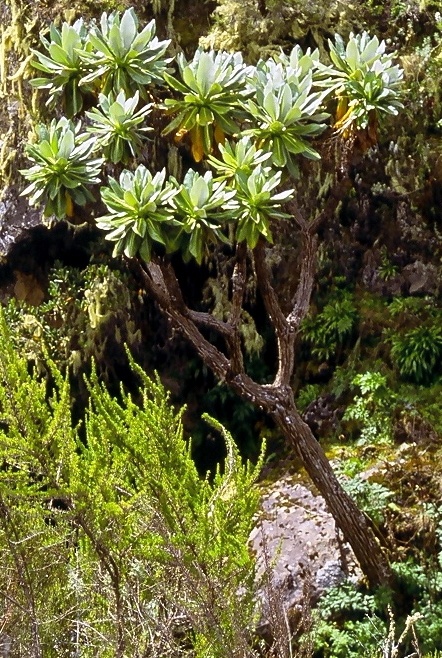

Conservation status
- Least Concern (IUCN 3.1)

Scientific classification
- Kingdom: Plantae
- Clade: Tracheophytes
- Clade: Angiosperms
- Clade: Eudicots
- Clade: Asterids
- Order: Asterales
- Family: Asteraceae
- Genus: Dendrosenecio
- Species: D. battiscombei

Binomial name
- Dendrosenecio battiscombei (R.E.Fr. & T.C.E.Fr.) E.B.Knox

Synonyms
- Senecio battiscombei R.E.Fr. & T.C.E.Fr. Senecio aberdaricus R.E.Fr. & T.C.E.Fr. Source

= Dendrosenecio battiscombei =

Species of flowering plant

Dendrosenecio battiscombei (synonym Senecio battiscombei) is one of the giant groundsels that lives on the slopes of Mount Kenya and the Aberdare Range. Like Dendrosenecio adnivalis on the Ruwenzori Mountains and the Virunga Mountains, Dendrosenecio battiscombei grows in the lower wetter areas of the Afro-Alpine zone.

== Infraspecific name synonymy ==
- Dendrosenecio battiscombei (R.E.Fr. & T.C.E.Fr.) E.B.Knox
  - Dendrosenecio johnstonii (Oliv.) B.Nord. subsp. battiscombei (R.E.Fr. & T.C.E.Fr.) B.Nord.
  - Senecio aberdaricus R.E.Fr. & T.C.E.Fr.
  - Senecio battiscombei R.E.Fr. & T.C.E.Fr.
  - Senecio johnstonii Oliv. var. battiscombei (R.E.Fr. & T.C.E.Fr.) Mabb.
