= Dendrosenecio erici-rosenii =

Conservation status
- Least Concern (IUCN 3.1)

Scientific classification
- Kingdom: Plantae
- Clade: Tracheophytes
- Clade: Angiosperms
- Clade: Eudicots
- Clade: Asterids
- Order: Asterales
- Family: Asteraceae
- Genus: Dendrosenecio
- Species: D. erici-rosenii

Binomial name
- Dendrosenecio erici-rosenii (R.E.Fr. & T.C.E.Fr.) E.B.Knox

Synonyms
- Senecio erici-rosenii R.E.Fr. & T.C.E.Fr.; Senecio johnstonii var. erici-rosenii (R.E.Fr. & T.C.E.Fr.) C.Jeffrey

Species of plant

Dendrosenecio erici-rosenii one of the East African giant groundsel and this one can be found on the Rwenzori Mountains, Virunga Mountains and the Mitumba Mountains. It is a species of the genus Dendrosenecio and is also a collection of reclassified Senecio species.

== Description ==
Dendrosenecio erici-rosenii grows to 6 meters tall. The old leaves drop off and leave a very slender stem. Flower heads have very prominent yellow ray flowers.

== Distribution ==
Dendrosenecio erici-rosenii is found more on sloping, better-drained soils on the Rwenzori, Virunga, and Mitumba mountains between 3,500 and 4,500 meters. It is also found between 4,400 and 5,000 meters but does not produce flowers there.

== Infraspecific name synonymy ==
The names for the giant groundsels have become somewhat confusing:

- Dendrosenecio erici-rosenii (R.E.Fr. & T.C.E.Fr.) E.B.Knox
  - Dendrosenecio erici-rosenii (R.E.Fr. & T.C.E.Fr.) E.B.Knox subsp. alticola (Mildbr.) E.B.Knox
    - Senecio adnivalis Stapf var. alticola (T.C.E.Fr.) Hedberg
    - Senecio adnivalis Stapf var. intermedia Hauman
    - Senecio alticola T.C.E.Fr. var. subcalvescens Hauman
    - Senecio johnstonii Oliv. var. alticola (T.C.E.Fr.) C.Jeffrey
    - Senecio refractisquamatus De Wild. var. intermedia (Hauman) Robyns
  - Dendrosenecio erici-rosenii (R.E.Fr. & T.C.E.Fr.) E.B.Knox subsp. erici-rosenii
    - Senecio erici-rosenii R.E.Fr. & T.C.E.Fr.
    - Senecio johnstonii Oliv. var. erici-rosenii (R.E.Fr. & T.C.E.Fr.) C.Jeffrey
    - Senecio kahuzicus Humb.
    - Senecio longeligulatus De Wild.
