= Dendrosenecio meruensis =

Scientific classification
- Kingdom: Plantae
- Clade: Tracheophytes
- Clade: Angiosperms
- Clade: Eudicots
- Clade: Asterids
- Order: Asterales
- Family: Asteraceae
- Genus: Dendrosenecio
- Species: D. meruensis

Binomial name
- Dendrosenecio meruensis (Cotton & Blakelock) E.B.Knox

Synonyms

Species of flowering plant

Dendrosenecio meruensis is one of the East African giant groundsel, this one is endemic to the slopes of Mount Meru. Once they were considered to be of the genus Senecio but since then have been reclassified into their own genus Dendrosenecio.

== Description ==
Dendrosenecio meruensis an upright plant that can grow to 7 meters tall, with trunks up to 35 centimeters in diameter and pith diameter of 2 centimeters. Leaf-rosettes of 15 to 20 leaves which are somewhat loose around the stem. Leaf bases retained for 1 to 2 meters around the stem and below the leaf-rosette.

"Repeated reproduction and branching yields a sprawling, open canopy with up to 10–30 aerial meristems in mature trees." Leaf surfaces are elliptical, 113 centimeters long and 34 centimeters wide, with cushions of hair cushion weakly to strongly developed on upper leaf surface. The lower leaf surface is hairless or with slight small, soft hairs sometimes cobweb-like along lower mid-vein. Inflorescence broadly flat on the top and can be up to 100 centimeters tall with diameters of 50 centimeters. The flower heads are presented horizontally. 12 to 17 yellow ray florets that can be up to 23 millimeters long and 40 to 65 disc florets.

== Distribution ==
Found between 2850 and 3350 meters up the slopes of Mount Meru.

The following was presented as a first hand view of the flora on Mount Meru:

Mount Meru (2007)
From the Arusha Region, "3400 meters, giving way to alpine Pentameris (syn. Pentaschistis) tussock grassland. In wetter areas, and on the western slopes in deep valleys, giant groundsels (Senecio meruensis) and Lobelia deckenii occur with many other afroalpine species such as Anemone thomsonii, Disa stairsii, Gladiolus watsonioides and Swertia kilimandscharica. On the drier western, northern and eastern slopes Stoebe kilimandscharica (Seriphium kilimandscharicum) bushes replace ericaceous heath, with Artemisia afra, Anthospermum usambarense and Adenocarpus mannii. In absence of fire, both types of subalpine heaths have a gradual transition to forests around 3000 meters altitude with isolated subalpine bush patches in the openings of Hagenia abyssinica forest at 2700-2800 meters altitude and Hagenia abyssinica forest patches in protected valleys at 3240 meters."

== Infraspecific name synonymy ==
The names for the giant groundsels have become somewhat confusing:

- Dendrosenecio meruensis (Cotton & Blakelock) E.B.Knox
  - Senecio johnstonii Oliv. var. meruensis (Cotton & Blakelock) C.Jeffrey
  - Senecio meruensis Cotton & Blakelock
