= Dendrosenecio cheranganiensis =

Conservation status
- Endangered (IUCN 3.1)

Scientific classification
- Kingdom: Plantae
- Clade: Tracheophytes
- Clade: Angiosperms
- Clade: Eudicots
- Clade: Asterids
- Order: Asterales
- Family: Asteraceae
- Genus: Dendrosenecio
- Species: D. cheranganiensis

Binomial name
- Dendrosenecio cheranganiensis (Cotton & Blakelock) E.B.Knox

Synonyms

Extinct species of flowering plant

Dendrosenecio cheranganiensis is one of the East African giant groundsels, this species endemic to the Cherangani Hills of Kenya. Formerly a species of the genus Senecio, it has been reclassified to Dendrosenecio.

== Description ==
Dendrosenecio cheranganiensis can grow to 6 meters tall, with trunks up to 25 centimeters in diameter and pith with diameters of 2 centimeters. Leaf-rosettes of 40–70 leaves. Infrequent reproduction makes these giant plants sparsely branched and columnar. They rarely exceed three reproductive cycles. Leaves can be up to 94 centimeters long and 25 centimeters wide. Inflorescence can be 100 centimeters tall and 70 centimeters in diameter. 10 to 13 ray florets and 25 to 50 disc florets.

== Distribution ==
D. cheranganiensis grows between 2600 and 3400 meters on the slopes of the Cherangani Hills.

== Infraspecific name synonymy ==
The names for the giant groundsels have become somewhat confusing:

- Dendrosenecio cheranganiensis (Cotton & Blakelock) E.B.Knox
  - Dendrosenecio cheranganiensis (Cotton & Blakelock) E.B.Knox subsp. cheranganiensis
    - Dendrosenecio cheranganiensis (Cotton & Blakelock) E.B.Knox subsp. cheranganiensis (2005).
    - Dendrosenecio johnstonii (Oliv.) B.Nord. subsp. cheranganiensis (Cotton & Blakelock) B.Nord.
    - Senecio cheranganiensis Cotton & Blakelock
    - Senecio johnstonii Oliv. subsp. cheranganiensis (Cotton & Blakelock) Mabb.
  - Dendrosenecio cheranganiensis (Cotton & Blakelock) E.B.Knox subsp. dalei
    - Dendrosenecio cheranganiensis (Cotton & Blakelock) E.B.Knox subsp. dalei
    - Dendrosenecio johnstonii (Oliv.) B.Nord. subsp. dalei (Cotton & Blakelock) B.Nord.
    - Senecio dalei Cotton & Blakelock
    - Senecio johnstonii Oliv. subsp. dalei (Cotton & Blakelock) Mabb.
