= Dendrosenecio elgonensis =

Conservation status
- Least Concern (IUCN 3.1)

Scientific classification
- Kingdom: Plantae
- Clade: Tracheophytes
- Clade: Angiosperms
- Clade: Eudicots
- Clade: Asterids
- Order: Asterales
- Family: Asteraceae
- Genus: Dendrosenecio
- Species: D. elgonensis

Binomial name
- Dendrosenecio elgonensis (T.C.E.Fr.) E.B.Knox

Synonyms

Species of flowering plant

Dendrosenecio elgonensis is one of the giant groundsel of East Africa; this one is endemic to Mount Elgon. They used to be considered part of the genus Senecio but recently have been reclassified to their own genus, Dendrosenecio.

== Description ==
Dendrosenecio elgonensis can grow to 7 meters tall, with a trunk to 30 centimeters in diameter and pith 2.5 to 3 centimeters in diameter. D. elgonensis generally keeps its stem cloaked with its withered and decaying foliage (or with retained leaf-bases after fire) but eventually loses them as bark develops. "Periodic reproduction yields sparsely branched, spreading plants that rarely exceed five reproductive cycles."

Leaf surfaces are elliptic or heart-shaped, 97 centimeters long and 32 centimeters wide. The lower portion of the leaves are hairless except for along the mid-vein.

Flower heads are presented horizontally. 11 to 13, 24 millimeter long ray florets and 40 to 70 disc florets.

== Distribution ==
Found on the slopes of Mount Elgon between 2750 and 4200 meters.

== Infraspecific name synonymy ==
The names for the giant groundsels have become somewhat confusing:

- Dendrosenecio elgonensis (T.C.E.Fr.) E.B.Knox
  - Dendrosenecio elgonensis (T.C.E.Fr.) E.B.Knox subsp. barbatipes (Hedberg) E.B.Knox
    - Dendrosenecio johnstonii (Oliv.) B.Nord. subsp. barbatipes (Hedberg) B.Nord.
    - Senecio barbatipes Hedberg
    - Senecio gardneri Cotton - non C.B.Clarke—nom. illegit. (ill.)
    - Senecio gardneri Cotton var. ligulatus Cotton & Blakelock
    - Senecio johnstonii Oliv. subsp. barbatipes (Hedberg) Mabb.
    - Senecio johnstonii Oliv. var. ligulatus (Cotton & Blakelock) C.Jeffrey
  - Dendrosenecio elgonensis (T.C.E.Fr.) E.B.Knox subsp. elgonensis
    - Dendrosenecio johnstonii (Oliv.) B.Nord. subsp. elgonensis (T.C.E.Fr.) B.Nord.
    - Senecio amblyphyllus Cotton
    - Senecio elgonensis T.C.E.Fr.
    - Senecio johnstonii Oliv. var. elgonensis (T.C.E.Fr.) Mabb.
