= Strangospora senecionis =

Scientific classification
- Kingdom: Fungi
- Division: Ascomycota
- Family: Strangosporaceae
- Genus: Strangospora
- Species: S. senecionis

Binomial name
- Strangospora senecionis Lambinon & Vězda (1979)

Species of lichen

Strangospora senecionis is a species of lichen in the family Strangosporaceae. It is found in Africa, where it grows on the bark and wood of the native plant Dendrosenecio johnstonii. The species is distinguished primarily by its cylindrical spores, a characteristic feature within the genus Strangospora.

== Taxonomy ==
Strangospora senecionis was described as a new species in 1979 by Jacques Lambinon and Antonín Vězda. The type specimen was collected from the Ruzizi Plain of the volcanic Mount Karisimbi in the Virunga Mountains, Kivu Province, Zaire (now Democratic Republic of the Congo), at an elevation of 3,550 metres above sea level. Strangospora senecionis grows on the bark and wood of old trunks of Dendrosenecio johnstonii ssp. refractisquamati (then classified in genus Senecio), a giant groundsel plant native to parts of Africa.

== Description ==
The thallus (main body) of S. senecionis is epixylous (growing on wood) or epiphloeodal (growing on bark), extremely thin, whitish, and generally almost indistinct or invisible. Its apothecia (fruiting bodies) are lecideine in form (disc-like with a proper margin), varying in colour from livid (bluish-gray) to livid-brown, but most commonly appearing black and shiny. They are tightly constricted at the base, initially with a thin margin and somewhat flat disc, but quickly becoming hemispherical or somewhat spherical with an indistinct margin. They measure 0.4–0.7 mm in width.

Microscopically, the excipulum (outer layer of the apothecium) is composed of radiating hyphae (fungal filaments) and is sooty black in colour. The hypothecium (tissue beneath the hymenium) is sooty black to blackish-brown on the inside and shows no reaction to potassium hydroxide solution (KOH−). The hymenium (spore-producing layer) is 50–60 μm tall with a sooty upper part.

The paraphyses (sterile filaments among the asci) are branched, with upper branches erect and simple, having thickened, dark-coloured tips. The asci (spore sacs) are cylindrical-clavate with outer walls that are not gelatinous and contain multiple spores (about 30). The spores are simple (without internal divisions), cylindrical, measuring 8–12 μm long and 2 μm thick. Pycnidia (asexual reproductive structures) are sessile, globose, black, with a dot-like opening. The pycnospores (asexual spores) measure 3.3 μm long and 1 μm thick.
