= Marcescence =

Retention of dead plant organs that normally are shed

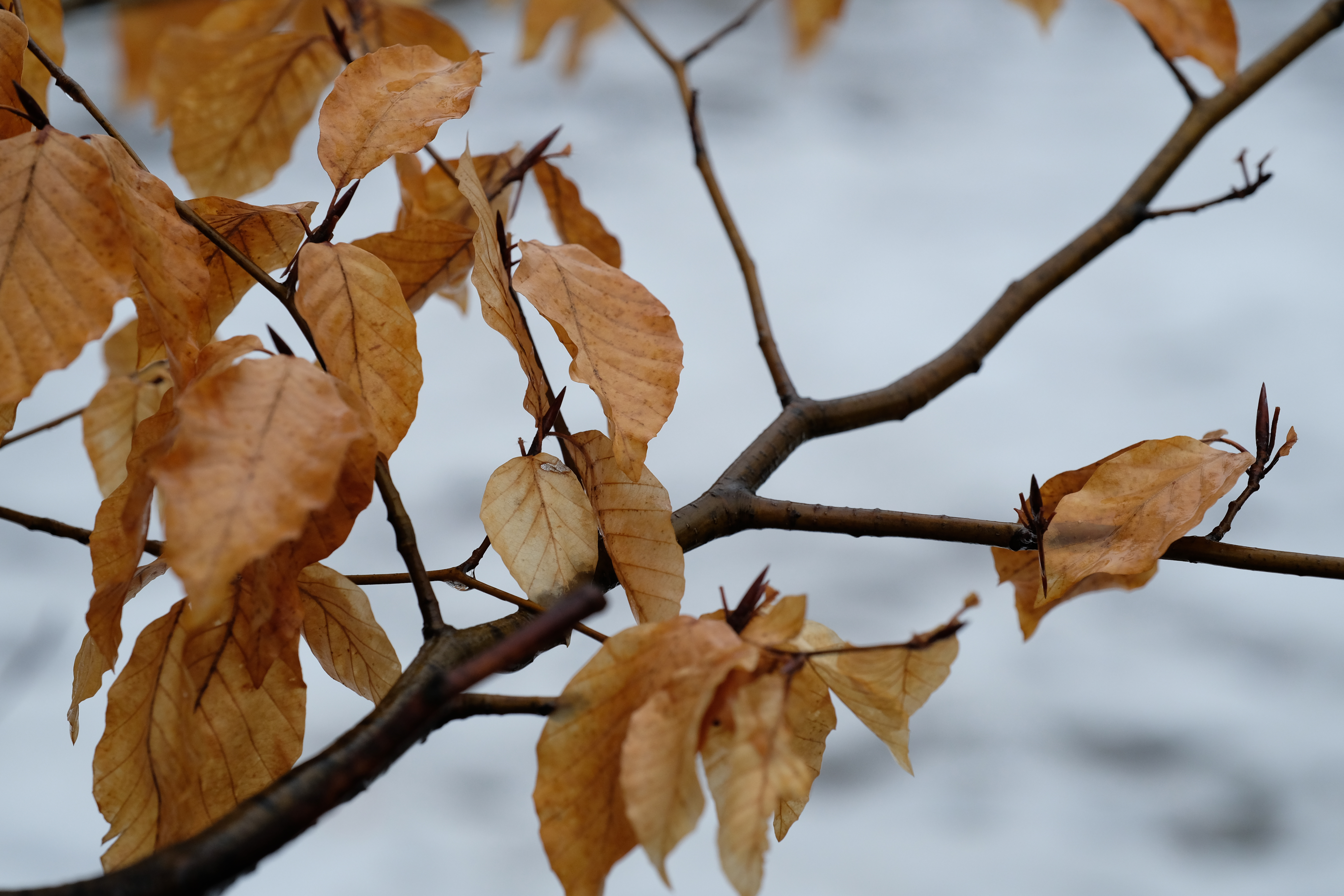
American beech (Fagus grandifolia) in winter

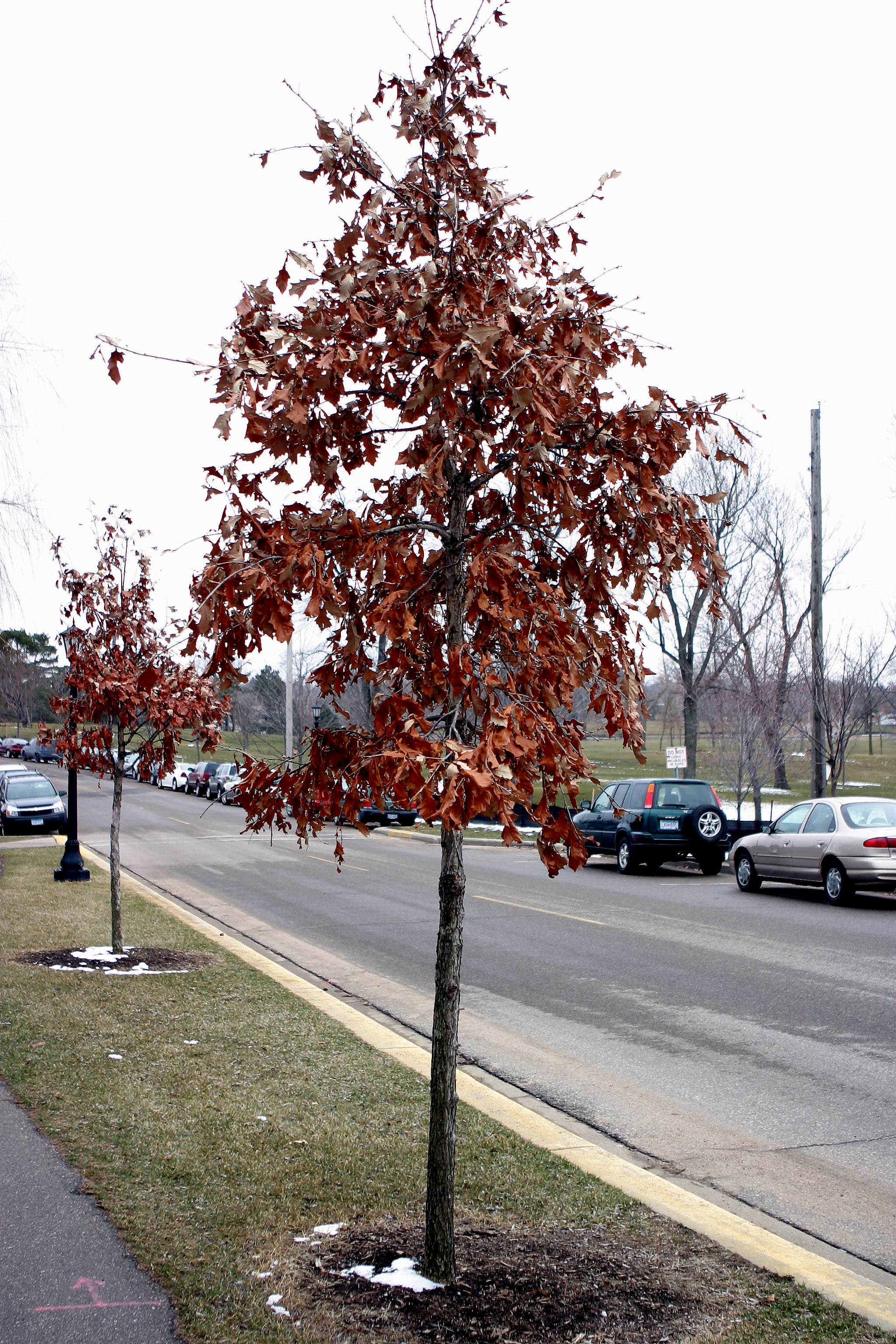
Oak (Quercus) with marcescent foliage

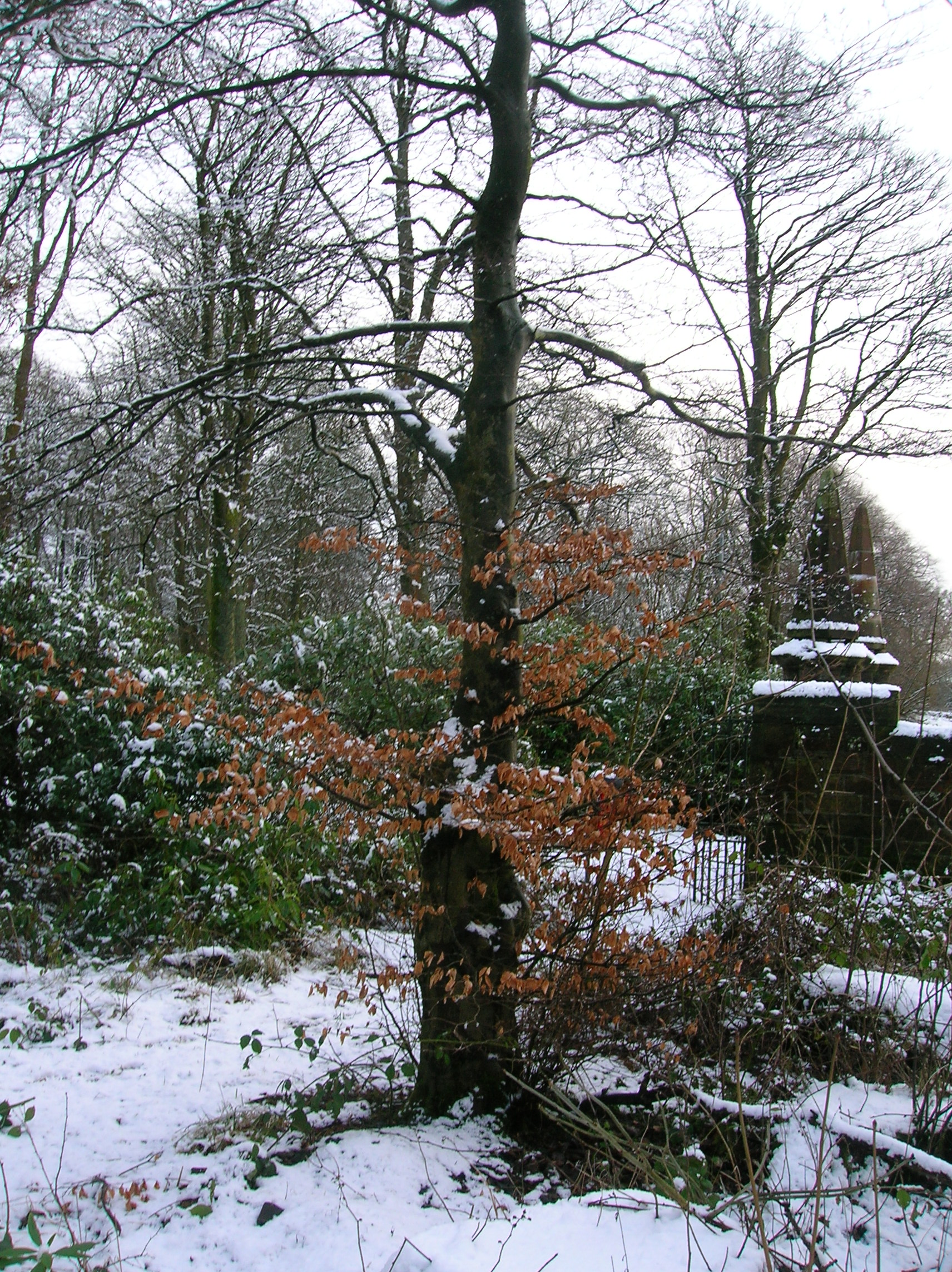
Typical partial marcescence on a mature beech (Fagus sylvatica) tree

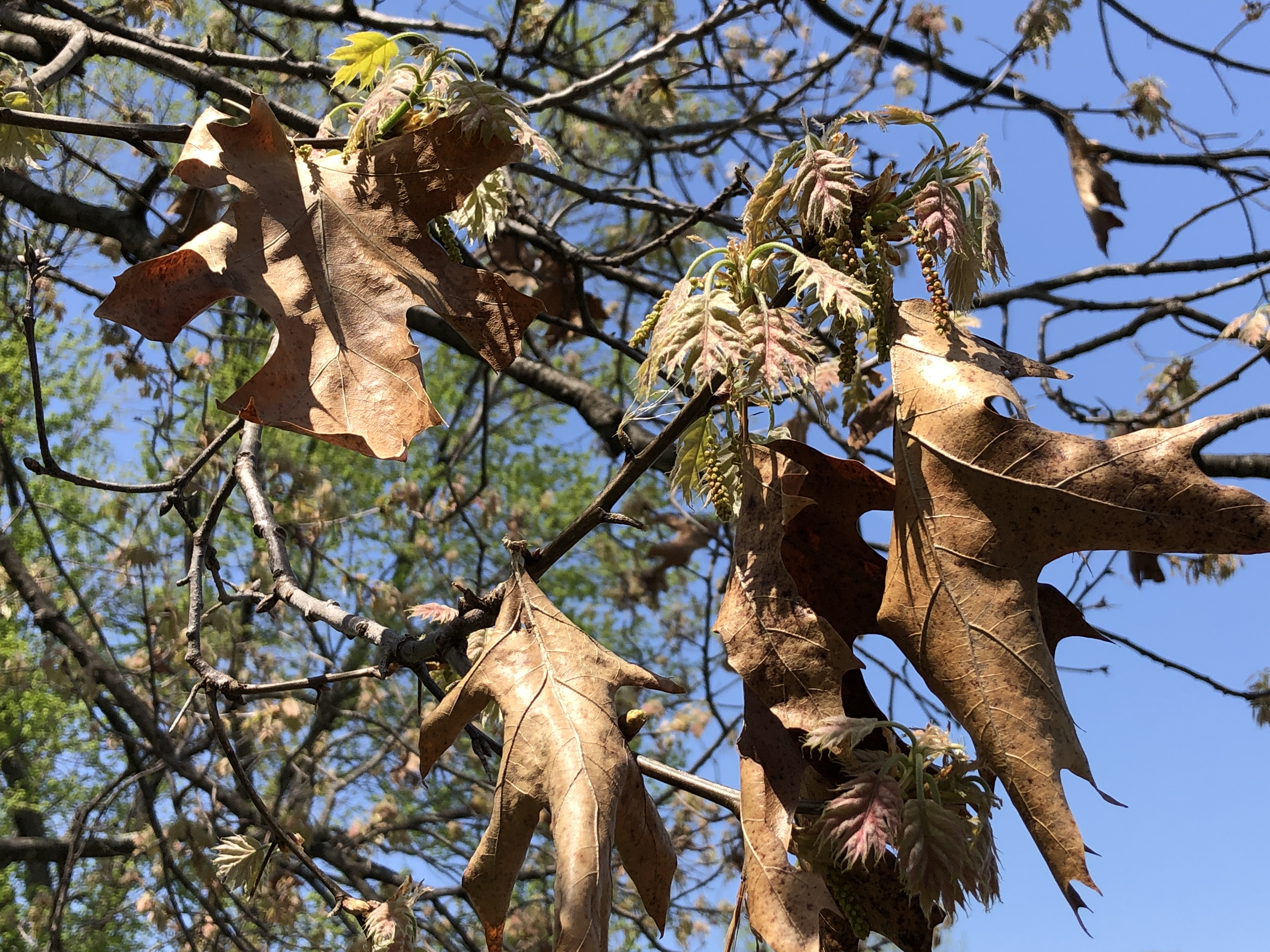
Red oak (Quercus rubra) leafing out before dropping marcescent leaves

Marcescence is the withering and persistence of plant organs that normally are shed, and is a term most commonly applied to plant leaves. The underlying physiological mechanism is that trees transfer water and sap from the roots to the leaves through their vascular cells, but in some trees as autumn begins, the veins carrying the sap slowly close until a layer of cells called the abscission layer completely closes off the vein allowing the tree to rid itself of the leaf. Leaf marcescence is most often seen on juvenile plants and may disappear as the tree matures. It also may not affect the entire tree; sometimes leaves persist only on scattered branches. Marcescence is most obvious in deciduous trees that retain leaves through the winter. Several trees normally have marcescent leaves such as oak (Quercus), beech (Fagus) and hornbeam (Carpinus), or marcescent stipules as in some but not all species of willows (Salix). All oak trees may display foliage marcescence, even species that are known to fully drop leaves when the tree is mature. Marcescent leaves of pin oak (Quercus palustris) complete development of their abscission layer in the spring. The base of the petiole remains alive over the winter. Many other trees may have marcescent leaves in seasons where an early freeze kills the leaves before the abscission layer develops or completes development. Diseases or pests can also kill leaves before they can develop an abscission layer.

Marcescent leaves may be retained indefinitely and do not break off until mechanical forces (wind for instance) cause the dry and brittle petioles to snap. The evolutionary reasons for marcescence are not clear; theories include protection of leaf buds from winter desiccation, and as a delayed source of nutrients or moisture-conserving mulch when the leaves finally fall and decompose in spring.

Many palms form a skirt-like or shuttlecock-like crown of marcescent leaves under new growth that may persist for years before being shed. In some species only juveniles retain dead leaves and marcescence in palms is considered a primitive trait.

The term marcescent is also used in mycology to describe a mushroom which (unlike most species, described as "putrescent") can dry out, but later revive and continue to disperse spores. Genus Marasmius is well known for this feature, which was considered taxonomically important by Elias Magnus Fries in his 1838 classification of fungi.

== Advantages ==
One possible advantage of marcescent leaves is that they may deter feeding of large herbivores, such as deer and moose, which normally eat the twigs and their nutritious buds. Dead, dry leaves make the twigs less nutritious and less palatable. They are also more noisy when browsed, thereby potentially deterring browsers.

Species that display marcescence, such as beech and oak, have adapted to retaining their leaves for prolonged periods to thrive in difficult growing media. When growth is most vulnerable in the early stages of spring, they benefit from the compost provided by the newly dropped and decomposing leaves, allowing them to outcompete species that have already dropped theirs. It is suggested that such variations can significantly impact their success in such conditions.

Some experimentation on plant litter from marcescent trees indicates that keeping the leaves above ground may increase the amount of photodegradation the leaves are exposed to. Because some marcescent species' leaves do not decompose well, the increased photodegradation may allow them to decompose better once they finally fall off the tree.

Others theorize that leaves which remain on a tree due to marcescence allow the tree to trap snow during the winter months. By using their dead leaves to collect additional snow, trees are able to provide themselves more water in spring when the snow begins to melt.

Marcescent leaves may protect some species from water stress or temperature stress. For example, in tropical alpine environments a wide variety of plants in different plant families and different parts of the world have evolved a growth form known as the caulescent rosette, characterized by evergreen rosettes growing above marcescent leaves. Examples of plants for which the marcescent leaves have been confirmed to improve survival, help water balance, or protect the plant from cold injury are Espeletia schultzii and Espeletia timotensis, both from the Andes.

The litter-trapping marcescent leaf crowns of Dypsis palms accumulate detritus thereby enhancing their nutrient supply, but in trapping nutrient-rich detritus, palms with marcescent leaf bases are also more likely to allow the germination of epiphytic figs in the marcescent leaves, with the figs possibly subsequently strangling the palms. Palm genera with taxa having marcescent leaf bases and attracting epiphytic fig growth include Attalea, Butia, Caryota, Copernicia, Elaeis, Hyphaene, Livistona, Phoenix, Sabal, and Syagrus.

== Image gallery ==
Marcescence in various species.

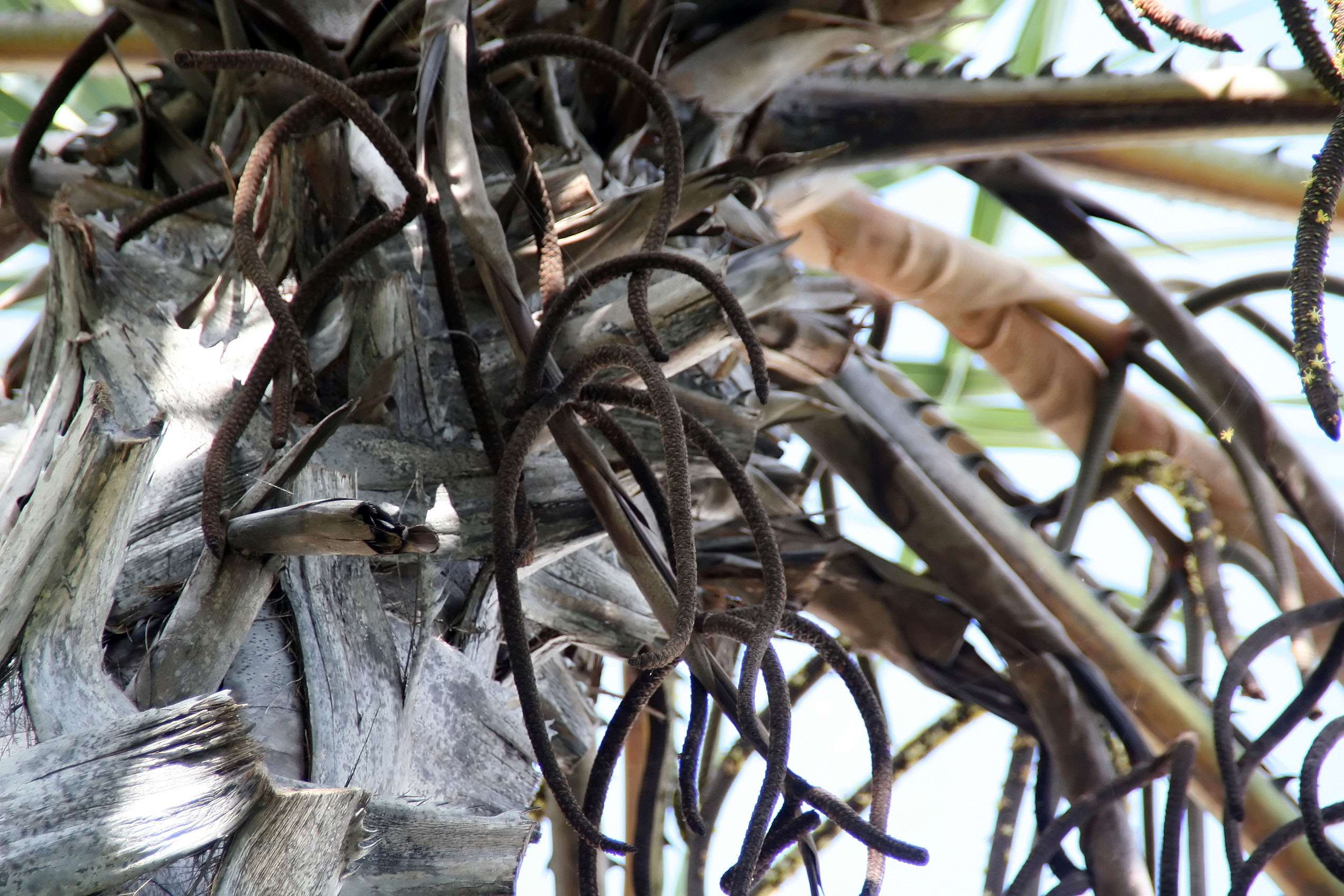
Hyphaene dichotoma (Arecaceae)

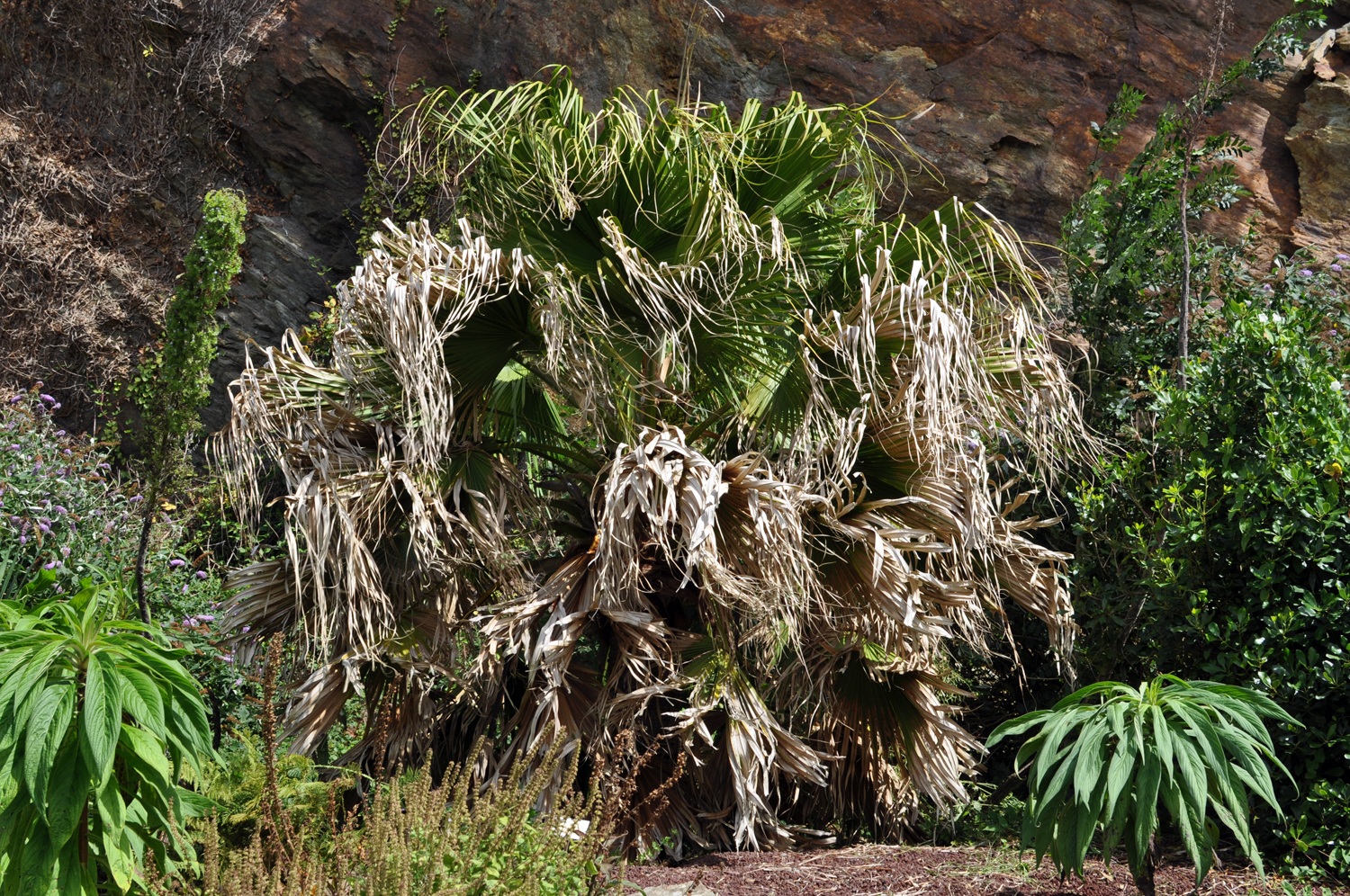
Livistona chinensis (Arecaceae)

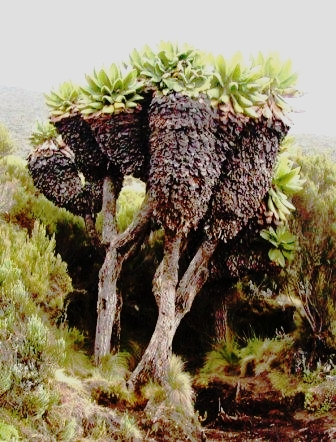
Dendrosenecio kilimanjari (Asteraceae)

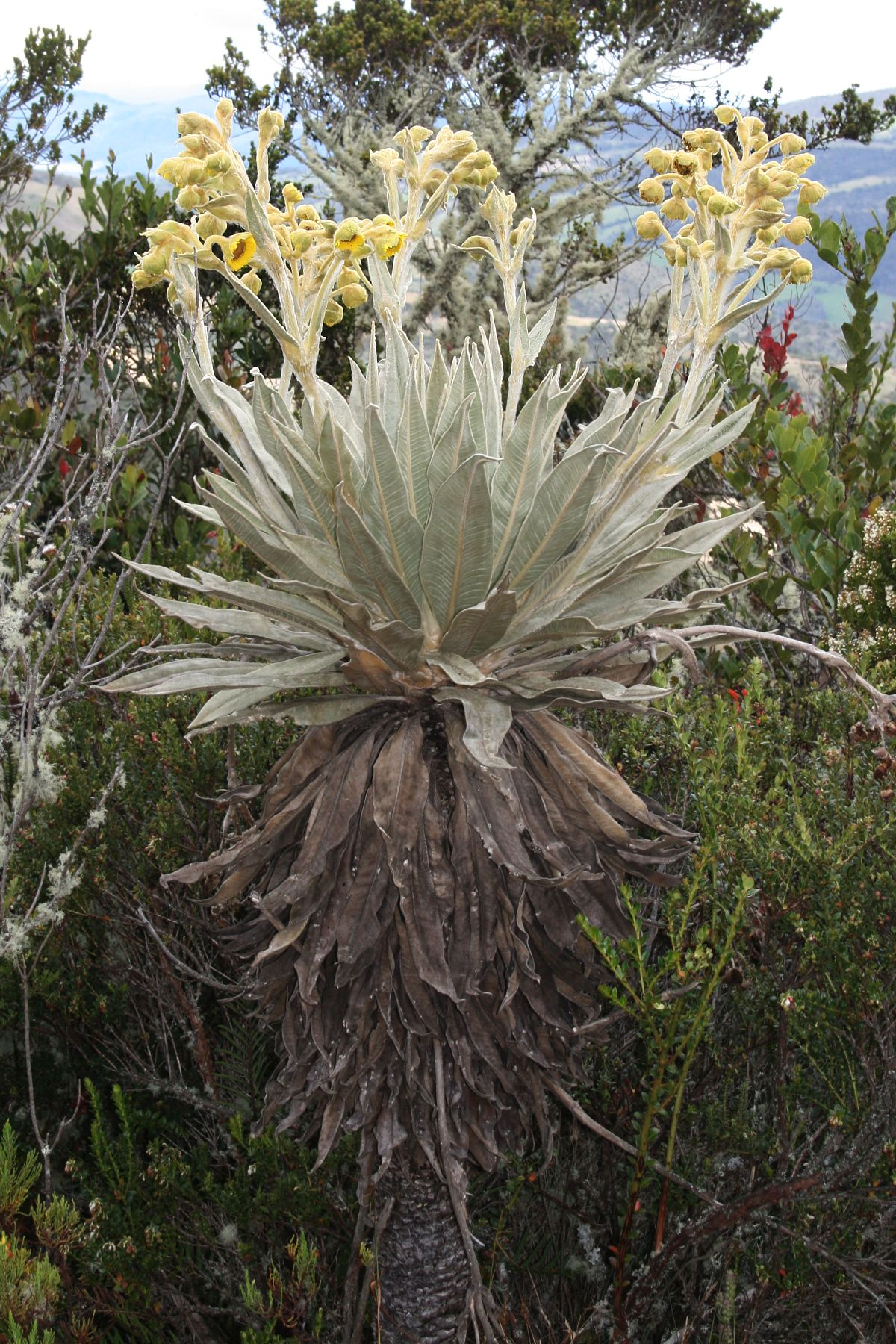
Espeletia grandiflora (Asteraceae)

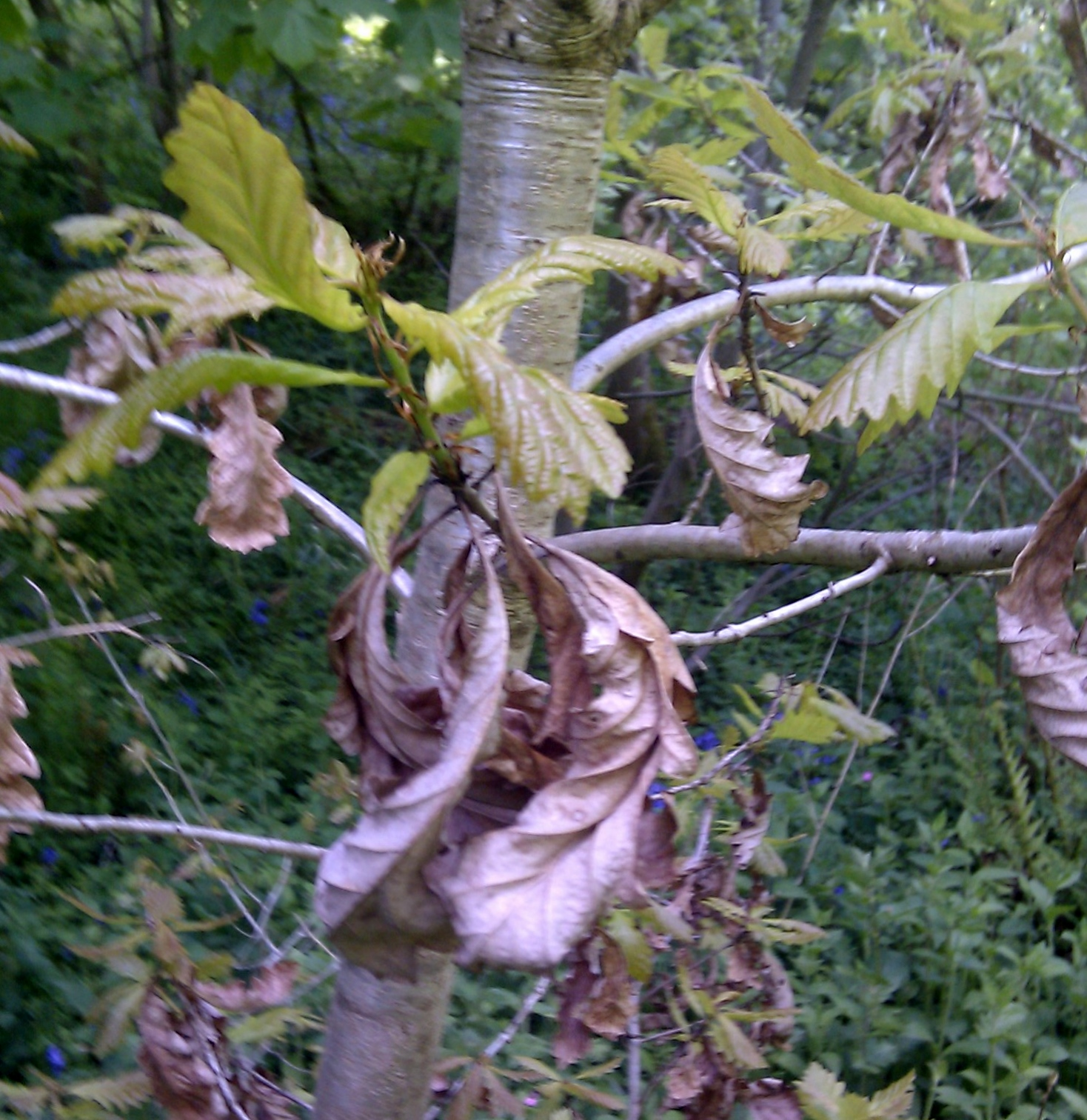
Quercus (Fagaceae)

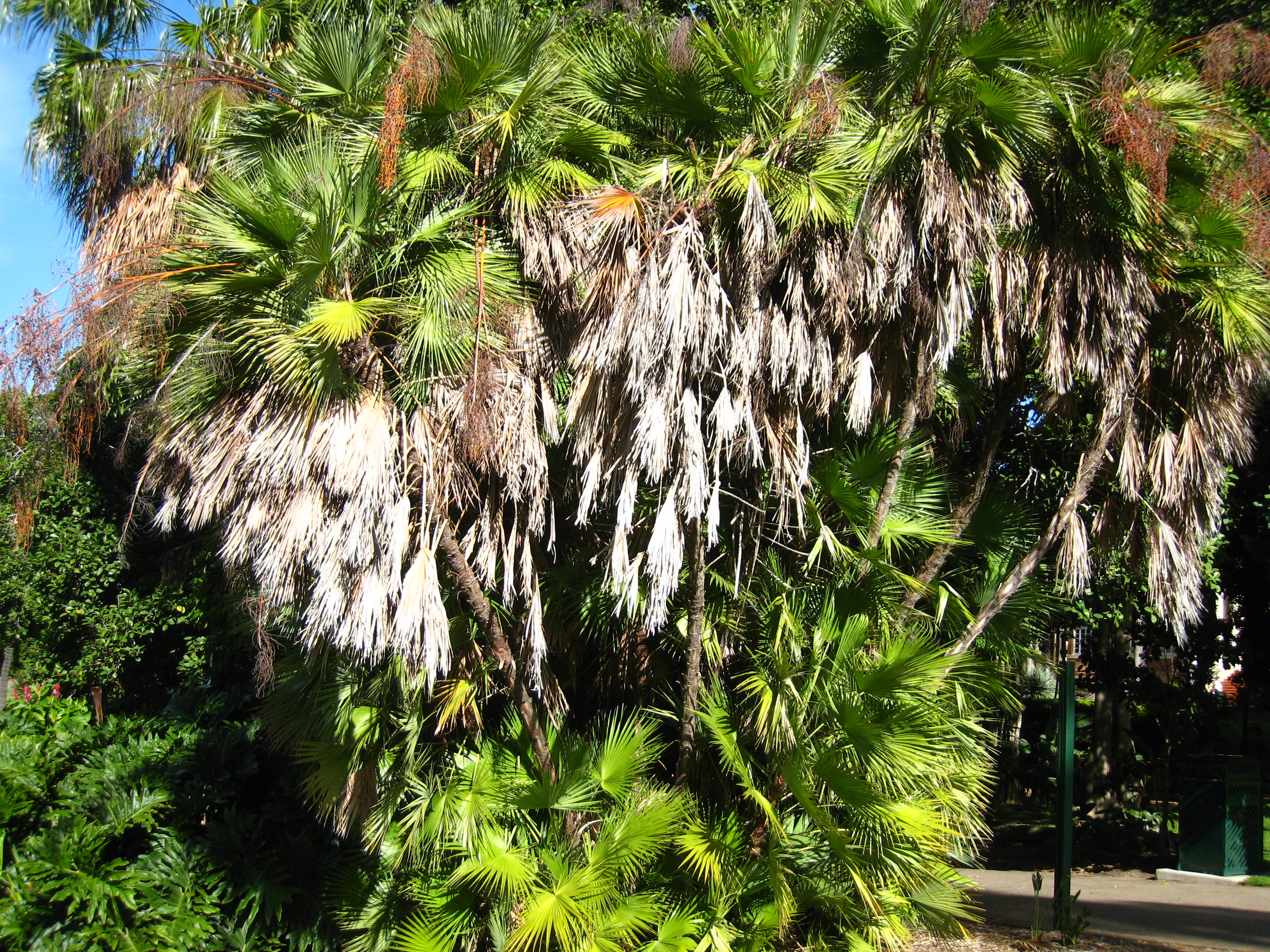
Acoelorraphe wrightii (Arecaceae)

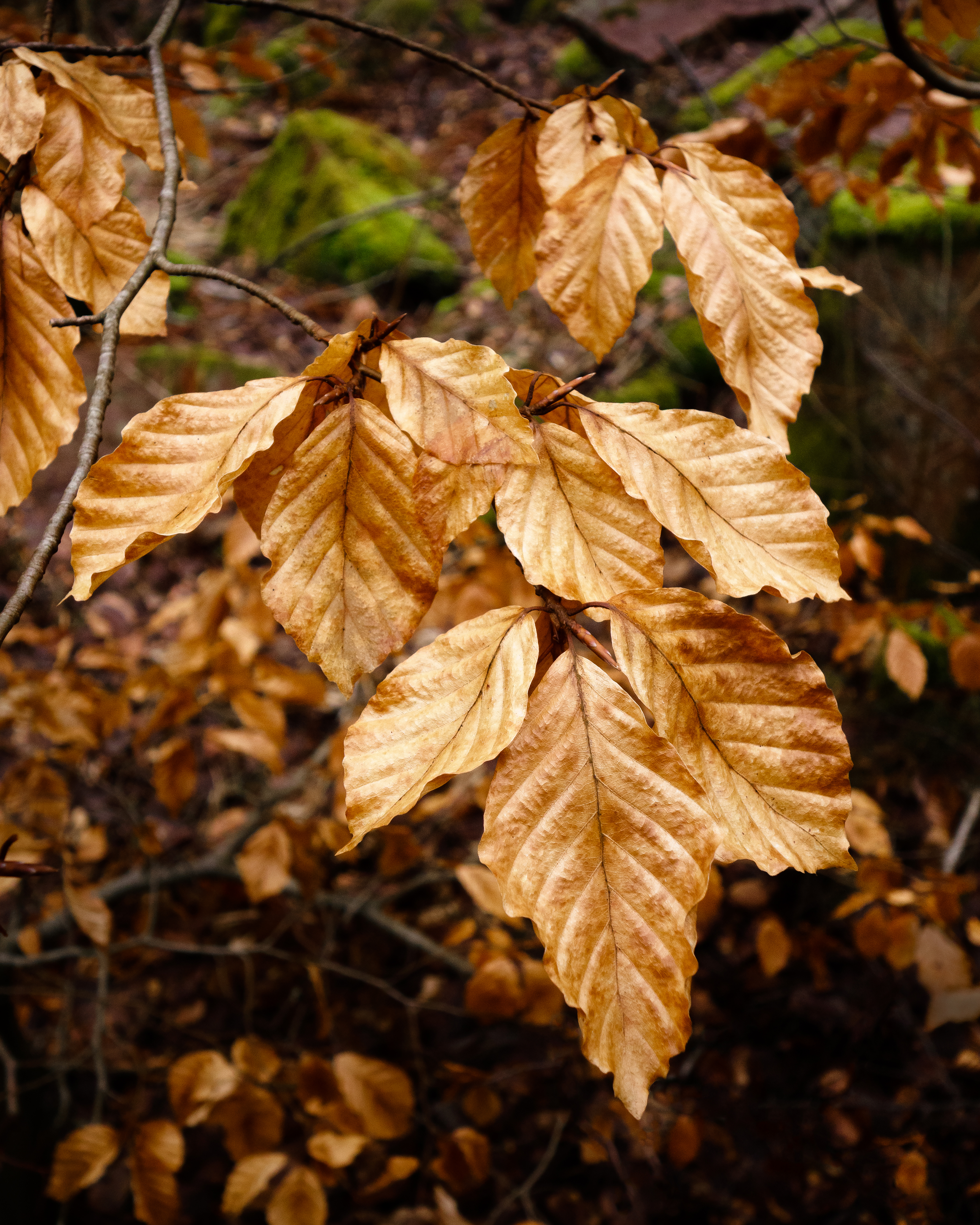
Fagus sylvatica (Fagaceae)

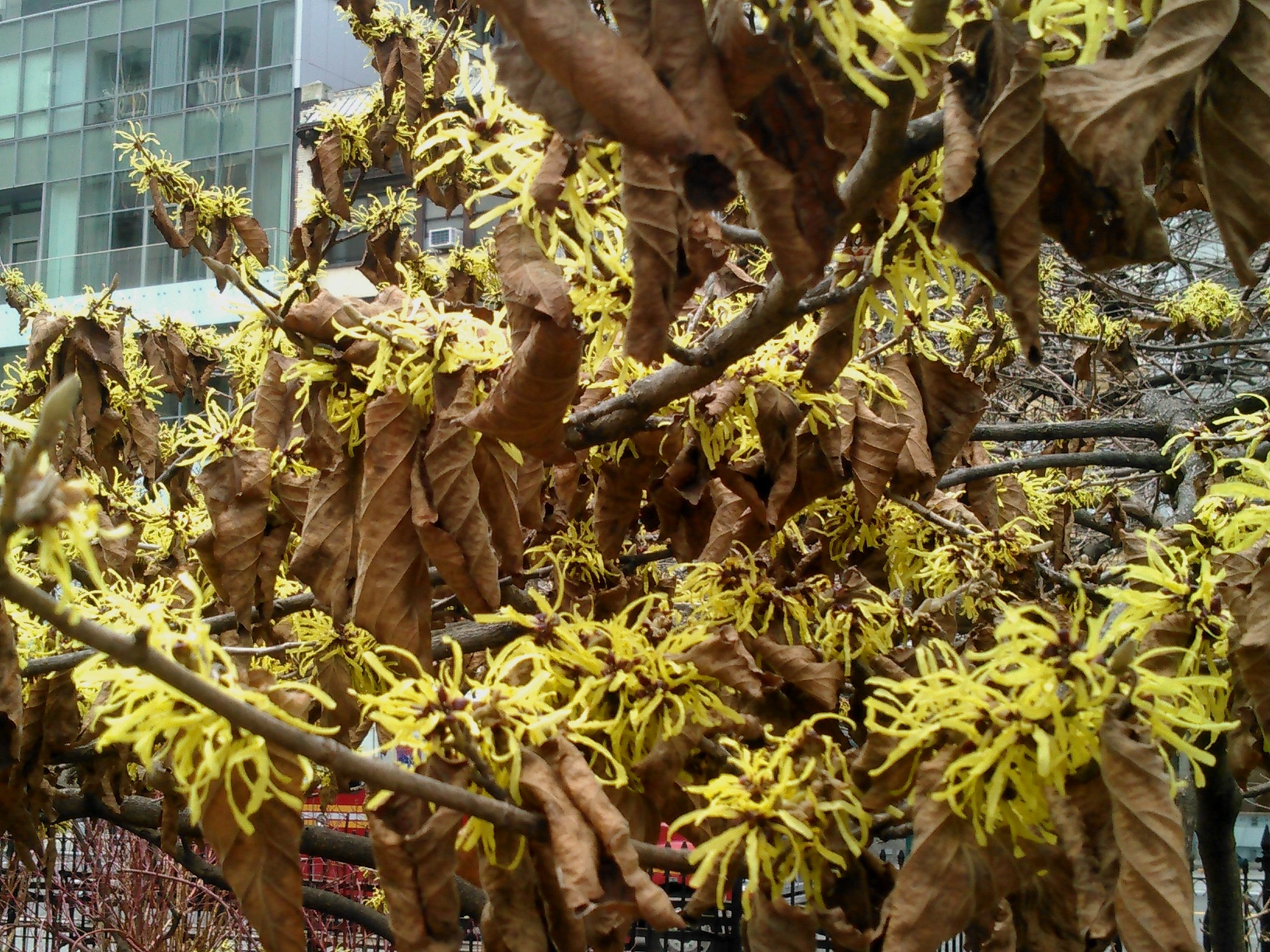
Hamamelis x intermedia cv. (Hamamelidaceae)

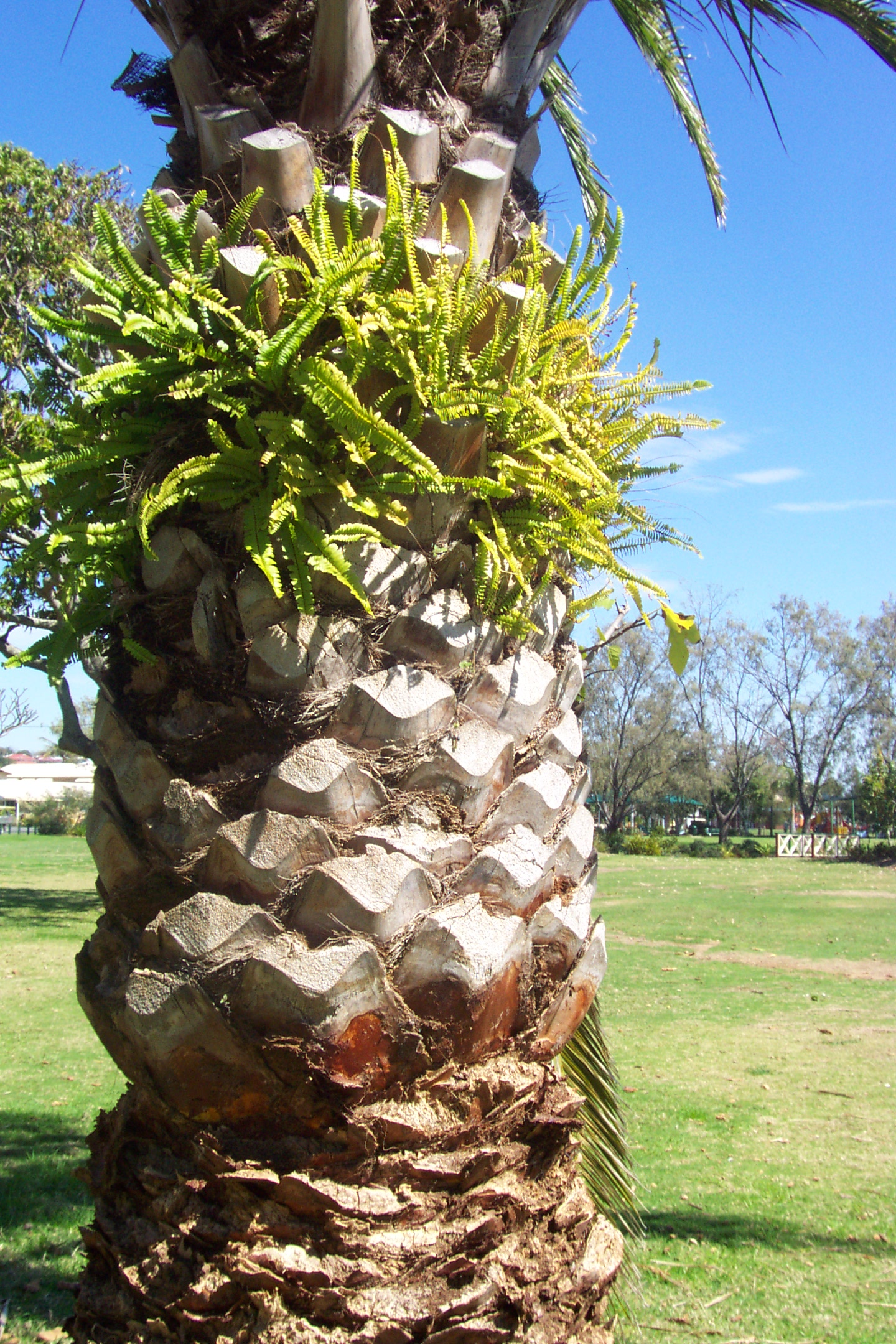
Phoenix canariensis (Arecaceae)

== Marcescent species ==
Marcescent species are found in the following (incomplete) list of plant families and genera:

- Arecaceae
  - see above
- Asparagaceae
  - Agave
  - Yucca
- Asphodelaceae
  - Aloe
- Asteraceae
  - Dendrosenecio
  - Espeletia (frailejones)
- Betulaceae
  - Carpinus (hornbeams)
- Fagaceae
  - Fagus (beeches)
  - Quercus (oaks)
- Hamamelidaceae
  - Hamamelis (witch-hazels)
- Salicaceae
  - Salix

== See also ==
- Persistence
- Evergreen
- Semi-deciduous
