= Dendrosenecio brassiciformis =

Conservation status
- Least Concern (IUCN 3.1)

Scientific classification
- Kingdom: Plantae
- Clade: Tracheophytes
- Clade: Angiosperms
- Clade: Eudicots
- Clade: Asterids
- Order: Asterales
- Family: Asteraceae
- Genus: Dendrosenecio
- Species: D. brassiciformis

Binomial name
- Dendrosenecio brassiciformis (R.E.Fr. & T.C.E.Fr.) Mabb. (1986)

Synonyms
- Dendrosenecio brassica subsp. brassiciformis (R.E.Fr. & T.C.E.Fr.) B.Nord. (1978); Senecio brassica subsp. brassiciformis (R.E.Fr. & T.C.E.Fr.) Mabb. (1973); Senecio brassiciformis R.E.Fr. & T.C.E.Fr. (1922); Senecio keniensis subsp. brassiciformis (R.E.Fr. & T.C.E.Fr.) C. Jeffrey (1986)

Species of flowering plant

Dendrosenecio brassiciformis is a species of East African giant groundsel. It is endemic to the slopes of Aberdare Range and bearing fruit but once, and dying after. Once considered to be of the genus Senecio but since have been reclassified into their own genus Dendrosenecio.

== Distribution ==
Dendrosenecio brassiciformis lives on the Aberdare Range from 2,950 to 3,950 meters (9,680 to 12,960 ft) elevation.

== Infraspecific name synonymy ==
- Dendrosenecio brassica B.Nord. subsp. brassiciformis (R.E.Fr. & T.C.E.Fr.) B.Nord.
- Dendrosenecio brassiciformis (R.E.Fr. & T.C.E.Fr.) Mabb.
- Senecio brassica R.E.Fr. & T.C.E.Fr. subsp. brassiciformis (R.E.Fr. & T.C.E.Fr.) Mabb.
- Senecio brassiciformis R.E.Fr. & T.C.E.Fr.
