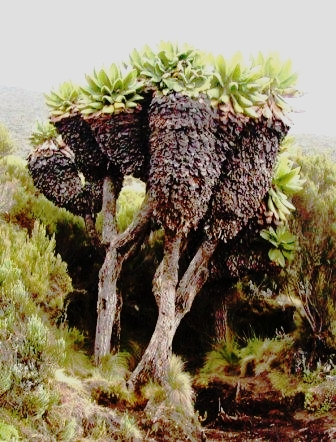
- Dendrosenecio kilimanjari

Scientific classification
- Kingdom: Plantae
- Clade: Tracheophytes
- Clade: Angiosperms
- Clade: Eudicots
- Clade: Asterids
- Order: Asterales
- Family: Asteraceae
- Subfamily: Asteroideae
- Tribe: Senecioneae
- Genus: Dendrosenecio (Hauman ex Hedberg) B.Nord.

Type species
- Dendrosenecio johnstonii (H.H.Johnst.) B.Nord.

Synonyms
- Senecio subg. Dendrosenecio Hauman ex Hedberg

= Dendrosenecio =

Giant groundsels

Genus of flowering plants

Dendrosenecio is a genus of flowering plants in the sunflower family. It is a segregate of the genus Senecio. Its members, the giant groundsels, are native to the higher-altitude zones of ten mountain groups in equatorial East Africa, where they form a conspicuous element of the flora.

== Description ==
They have a giant rosette habit, with a terminal leaf rosette at the apex of a stout woody stem. When they bloom, the flowers form a large terminal inflorescence. Concomitantly, two to four lateral branches are normally initiated. As a result, old plants have the appearance of candelabras the size of telephone poles, each branch with a terminal rosette.

Dendrosenecio genus are characterized by infrequent, periodic reproduction (polycarpic) with long intervals between flowering events and the production of new rosettes that lead to branching after flowering. The specific timing and mechanisms vary by species (D. keniensis flowers every year, D. keniodendron typically flowers synchronously every five or more years, D. cheranganiensis and D. elgonensis reproduce infrequently, rarely exceeding three to five reproductive cycles). Flowering is the only time the plants branch. A reproductive rosette produces a single, large terminal inflorescence. After the seeds mature and the original rosette dies, several new lateral rosettes emerge around the base of the dead inflorescence stalk, forming new branches. The entire population of a mountain often flowers synchronously at irregular intervals of 5 to 29 years. Most species rarely complete more than three to five reproductive cycles before the entire plant dies. Flowers produce plumed achenes that are primarily wind-dispersed.

== Species ==
Dendrosenecio varies geographically between mountain ranges and altitudinally on a single mountain. There has been disagreement among botanists as to which populations of Dendrosenecio warrant recognition as species, and which should be relegated to the status of subspecies or variety. The following list is taken from Knox & Palmer:

- Dendrosenecio adnivalis (Stapf) E.B.Knox
- Dendrosenecio battiscombei (R.E.Fr. & T.C.E.Fr.) E.B.Knox
- Dendrosenecio brassiciformis (R.E.Fr. & T.C.E.Fr.) Mabb.
- Dendrosenecio cheranganiensis (Cotton & Blakelock) E.B.Knox
- Dendrosenecio elgonensis (T.C.E.Fr.) E.B.Knox
- Dendrosenecio erici-rosenii (R.E.Fr. & T.C.E.Fr.) E.B.Knox
- Dendrosenecio johnstonii (Oliv.) B.Nord.
- Dendrosenecio keniensis (Baker f.) Mabb.
- Dendrosenecio keniodendron (R.E.Fr. & T.C.E.Fr.) B.Nord.
- Dendrosenecio kilimanjari (Mildbr.) E.B.Knox
- Dendrosenecio meruensis (Cotton & Blakelock) E.B.Knox

== Distribution ==
Groundsels of several species are found throughout the world as common roadside weeds, but nowhere except in the highlands of Africa do they exhibit such large tree forms.

— Theodore Roosevelt 1914

The giant groundsels are found in the alpine zone of the mountains of equatorial East Africa – Mount Kilimanjaro and Mount Meru in Tanzania, Mount Kenya, the Aberdare Range, and Cherangani Hills in Kenya, Mount Elgon on the Uganda–Kenya border, the Rwenzori Mountains on the Uganda–Democratic Republic of Congo (DRC) border, the Virunga Mountains on the borders of Rwanda, Uganda and the DRC, and Mitumba Mountains (Mount Kahuzi and Mount Muhi) in the east of the DRC.

With the exception of D. eric-rosenii, which occurs on several of the mountains of the Albertine Rift (Rwenzori, Virunga and Mitumba Mountains), and D. battiscombei and D. keniodendron, which are shared by Mount Kenya and the Aberdare Range, the species are individually confined to a single range. In several of the ranges different species, or subspecies, are found at different heights.

=== Distribution chart ===
Chart after Knox & Palmer:

Range	Kilimanjaro	Meru	Kenya	Aberdares	Cherangani	Elgon	Ruwenzori	Virunga	Mitumba
Higher altitude	D. kilimanjari ssp. cottonii		D. keniodendron	D. keniodendron		D. elgonensis ssp. barbatipes			
Intermediate altitude	D. kilimanjari ssp. kilimanjari	D. meruensis	D. keniensis	D. brassiciformis	D. cherangiensis ssp. dalei	D. elgonensis ssp. elgonensis	D. adnivalis (two subspecies)	D. eric-rosenii ssp. alticola	
Lower altitude	D. johnstonii		D. battiscombei	D. battiscombei	D. cherangiensis ssp. cherangiensis		D. eric-rosenii ssp. eric-rosenii	D. eric-rosenii ssp. eric-rosenii	D. eric-rosenii ssp. eric-rosenii

== Evolution and adaptation ==
The mountains of central and eastern Africa are an almost ideal model system for studying speciation and adaptation in plants. The mountains rise far above the surrounding plains and plateaus, tall enough to reach above the tree line and form sky islands. These predominantly volcanic peaks further simplify the model by their age and arrangement around the Lake Victoria basin and proximity to the equator.

The species found on Mount Kenya are by far the best model for altitudinal variation. D. keniodendron is the species which grows at the highest of altitudes, D. keniensis is found at the lower altitudes of the range where the species grows and D. battiscombei grows at the same altitudes as D. keniensis but in the wetter environments. The other mountains which are not tall enough to have a "big one at the top" have the two, one species in the drier land and one in the damper environments, or just one where the environment is not so extreme. This simplification works extremely well as an introduction to the giant groundsel of East Africa with one exception, Kilimanjaro, which has one species that lives at the top and only one species that lives below; subspecies and varieties live in the moister environments.

=== Gridded adaptive speciation studies ===
Each mountain has a vertical gradient of precipitation and temperature fluctuations. Mount Kilimanjaro at 5,895 metres (19,341 ft), Mount Kenya at 5,199 metres (17,057 ft) and Ruwenzori at 5,109 metres (16,762 ft) are the three tallest mountains in Africa; each tall enough to support altitude based layers of vegetative zones. Each mountain providing its own vertically placed array of isolated habitats.

Located from 50 to 1,000 kilometres (31 to 621 mi) around the equator, the environmental fluctuations occur as daily events of warm days and cold nights and are consistent throughout the year or as Hedberg described the situation: "summer every day, winter every night". In addition to the simplified environmental variables, these mountains are easily described for biogeographic analysis as their age and arrangement around the Lake Victoria basin make it easy to disentangle the effects of time and position.

==== Vegetation zones ====
Simplified grid system. Oldest mountain on the left.

In the altitudes between 3,400 and 4,500 meters (11,200 and 14,800 feet) some of the most extreme examples of adaptations can be found, which include:

- Massive leaf rosettes in which leaf development occurs in a large apical bud
- Water storage in the pith of the stem
- Insulation of the stem by retaining withered and dead foliage
- Secretion and impoundment of ice-nucleating polysaccharide fluids (a natural anti-freeze)
- Nyctinastic leaf movement (the leaves close when it gets cold)

At altitudes below 3,400 meters (11,200 feet) the daily temperature fluctuations are less extreme, the average daily temperature steadily increases, and the growth forms and ecology of the Dendrosenecio reflect the increased influence of biotic factors (such as competition for light) over abiotic factors (such as nightly frost).

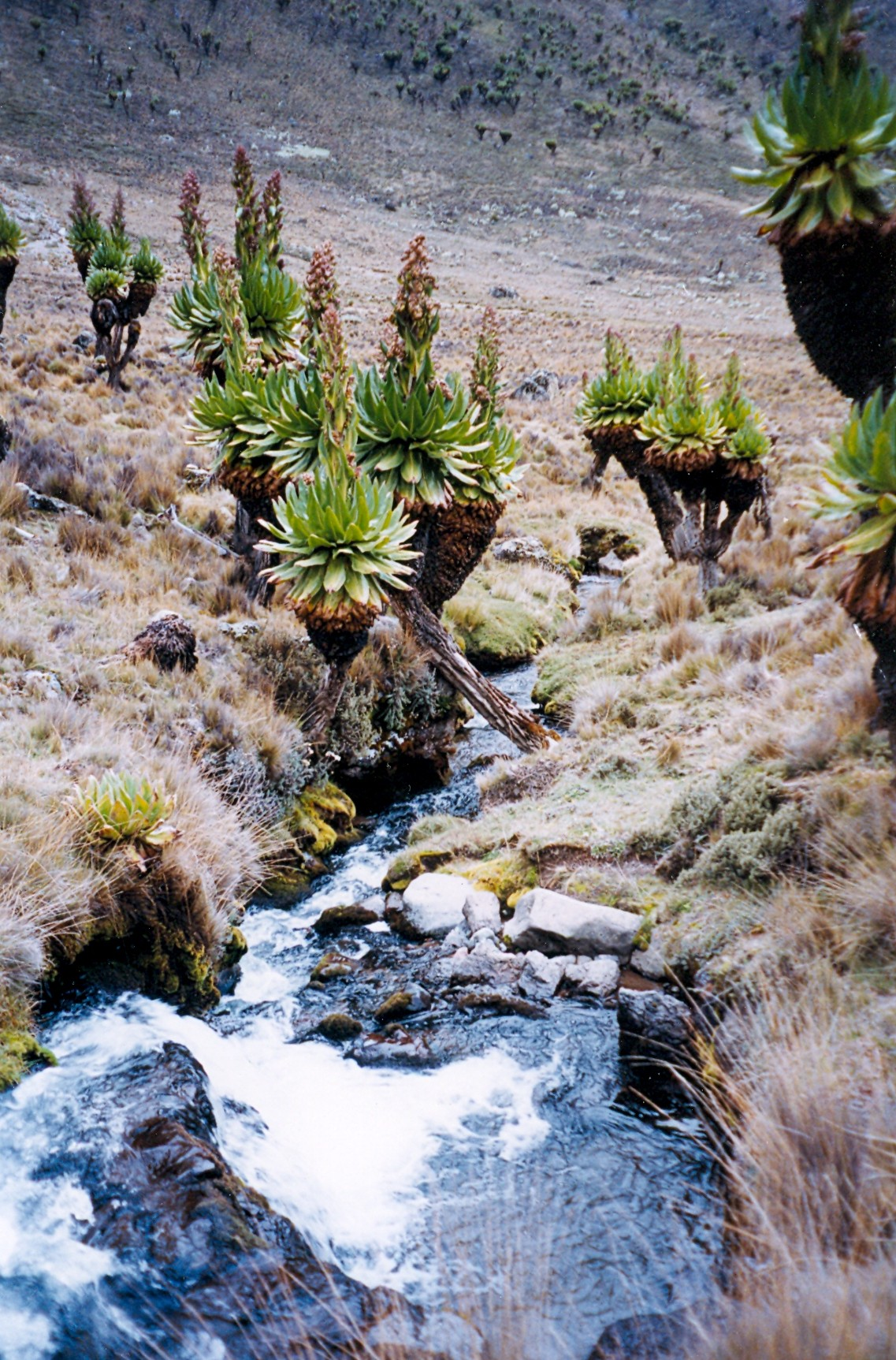
Dendrosenecio keniodendron on Mount Kenya

===== 3,400–3,800 meters (11,200–12,500 feet) =====
Given the name Afroalpine region by Hauman in 1955. There is a sharp boundary at 3,400 meters (3,000 meters on the north side) that separates the forest from the lower alpine zone, the environment is a moorland (low growing vegetation on acidic soils) and it is here that the Dendrosenecio start to grow among the mountain tussocks and sedges. D. keniensis grows in this region on Mount Kenya. A variety or subspecies of D. johnstonii live within this altitude range on all three of the tallest mountains.

===== 3,800–4,500 meters (12,500–14,800 ft) =====
The upper moorlands; this is where most of the D. brassica make their homes on all three of the mountains, living with tough dwarf shrubs.

===== 4,300–5,000 meters (14,100–16,400 ft) =====
Dendrosenecio woodlands, where each mountain has its own special variety. D. keniensis on Mount Kenya, D. kilimanjari on Mount Kilimanjaro and other species each on their own mountain.

===== 4,500 meters–peak (15,000 ft) =====
Populations of Dendrosenecio start to dwindle. Mount Kenya has the least vegetation in its upper parts due to its freezing temperatures.

==== Dispersal and establishment ====
Dispersal and establishment – descending altitude, descending time
Kilimanjaro; Dendrosenecio kilimanjari D. johnstonii
Aberdare Range; D. battiscombei D. brassiciformis			Mount Meru (Tanzania); D. meruensis
Mount Kenya; D. keniodendron D. keniensis D. battiscombei	Cherangani Hills; D. cheranganiensis	Mount Elgon; D. elgonensis	
Aberdare Range; D. keniodendron		Virunga Mountains; D. erici-rosenii	
		Mitumba Mountains; D. erici-rosenii	
Ruwenzori Mountains; D. erici-rosenii D. adnivalis

Biogeographic interpretation of the molecular phylogeny suggests that in the most recent one million years, the first giant senecios established themselves at higher elevations of Mount Kilimanjaro and became the species D. kilimanjari. As they moved down that mountain, adapting to live in the different environment at the lower altitudes of Mount Kilimanjaro, they became a new species, D. johnstonii. Some seeds found a way to Mount Meru and established themselves as the species D. meruensis, others found a way to get from Mount Kilimanjaro to the Aberdare Range and established themselves as D. battiscombei. D. battiscombei migrated into the wet alpine habitat on the Aberdares resulted in the formation of the species D. brassiciformis. Dispersal from the Aberdares to Mount Kenya established a second isolated population of D. battiscombei. Altitudinal speciation on Mount Kenya resulted in the formation of D. keniodendron and the "dwarf" D. keniensis. Dispersal from Mount Kenya back to the Aberdares established a second insular population of D. keniodendron. Dispersal from the Aberdares to the Cherangani Hills established two subspecies of D. cheranganiensis: D. cheranganiensis subsp. cheranganiensis and altitudinal (sub)speciation into the web alpine habitat resulted in D. cheranganiensis subsp. dalei. Dispersal from the Aberdares to Mount Elgon established D. elgonensis which is a point where several subspecies diverge and disperse: from Mount Elgon to the Virunga Mountains established D. erici-rosenii; from Mount Elgon to Mount Kahuzi (Mitumba Mountains) established a second population of D. erici-rosenii and dispersal from the Virunga Mountains to the Ruwenzori Mountains established a third population.

=== Parallel evolution ===
The communities of giant Dendrosenecio and giant lobelias found on these African mountains are an exceptional example of parallel or convergent evolution and repeated convergent evolution between these two groups; providing evidence that the unusual features of these plants are an evolutionary response to a challenging habitat and an environment which can be easily described for biogeographic analysis.

=== Cytological uniformity ===
Little variation was found in molecular phylogeny among the 40 recorded giant senecio collections (40 accessions), yet as a group they differ significantly from Cineraria deltoidea, the closest known relative. The gametophytic chromosome number of Dendrosenecio is n = 50. The polyploid Dendrosenecio is presumed to be decaploid (ten sets; 10x).
