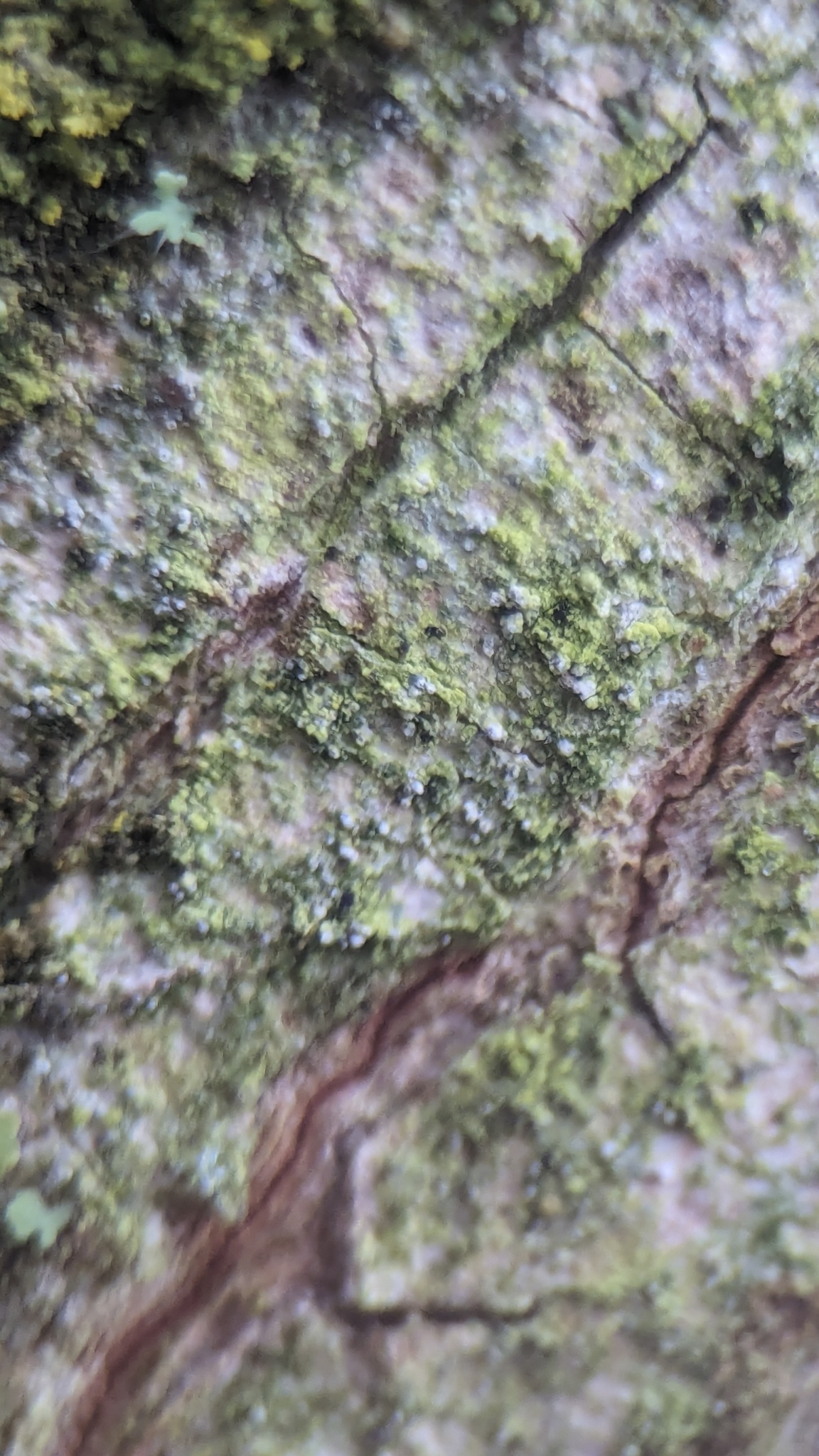
- Strangospora deplanata

Scientific classification
- Kingdom: Fungi
- Division: Ascomycota
- Family: Strangosporaceae; S.Stenroos, Miądl. & Lutzoni (2014)
- Genus: Strangospora; Körb. (1860)

Type species
- Strangospora pinicola (A.Massal.) Körb. (1860)

Synonyms
- Kullhemia P.Karst. (1878)

= Strangospora =

Genus of lichen-forming fungi

Strangospora is a genus of lichen-forming fungi. It is the only genus in the family Strangosporaceae, which itself is of uncertain taxonomic placement in the Ascomycota. It contains 10 species.

== Taxonomy ==
The genus was circumscribed in 1860 by German lichenologist Gustav Wilhelm Körber, with Strangospora pinicola assigned as the type species. The family Strangosporaceae was proposed in 2014 by Soili Stenroos, Jolanta Miadlikowska, and François Lutzoni, who used molecular phylogenetics to demonstrate that Strangospora should be removed from the Lecanorales and placed in its own family.

== Description ==
Species in the Strangosporaceae are crustose lichens, but sometimes have poorly developed thalli. They have a chlorococcoid photobiont (i.e., green algae of the genus Chlorococcum). The apothecia are biatorine – i.e. more or less lecideine in form, but light in colour and with a soft consistency – and have a poorly developed exciple. The asci are club-shaped (clavate) and have a gelatinous outer layer. Strangospora species mostly occur in the Northern Hemisphere, and grow on wood, on bark, or over bryophytes.

== Species ==
- Strangospora almquistii (H.Magn.) Poelt & Vězda (1977)
- Strangospora cyphalea (Tuck.) C.A.Morse & Lendemer (2019)
- Strangospora deplanata (Almq.) Clauzade & Cl.Roux (1985)
- Strangospora microhaema (Norman) R.A.Anderson (1975)
- Strangospora moriformis (Ach.) Stein (1879)
- Strangospora pinicola (A.Massal.) Körb. (1860)
- Strangospora selengensis Makryĭ & N.S.Golubk. (2001)
- Strangospora senecionis Lambinon & Vězda (1979)
- Strangospora torvula (Nyl.) Vitik., Ahti, Kuusinen, Lommi & T.Ulvinen (1997)
- Strangospora trabicola Körb. (1874)

Strangospora ochrophora (Nyl.) R.A.Anderson (1975) is now known as Piccolia ochrophora, while Strangospora delitescens (Arnold) Coppins (1992) is now Biatoridium delitescens.
