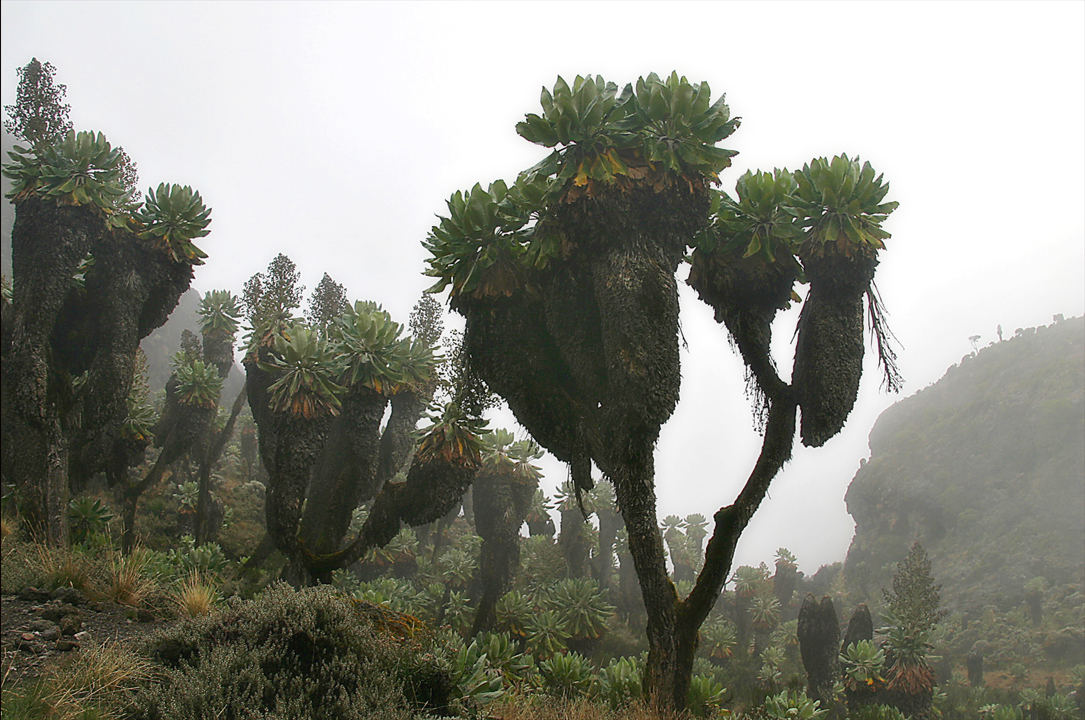

Conservation status
- Least Concern (IUCN 3.1)

Scientific classification
- Kingdom: Plantae
- Clade: Embryophytes
- Clade: Tracheophytes
- Clade: Angiosperms
- Clade: Eudicots
- Clade: Asterids
- Order: Asterales
- Family: Asteraceae
- Genus: Dendrosenecio
- Species: D. kilimanjari

Binomial name
- Dendrosenecio kilimanjari (Mildbr.) E.B.Knox

Synonyms
- Homotypic Synonyms: Senecio johnstonii var. kilimanjari (Mildbr.) C.Jeffrey; Senecio kilimanjari Mildbr.

= Dendrosenecio kilimanjari =

Species of flowering plant

Dendrosenecio kilimanjari is a species of flowering plant in the family Asteraceae. It is a giant groundsel found on Mount Kilimanjaro in Africa, below 4,000 metres (13,000 ft).

== Taxonomy ==
It was originally known as Senecio kilimanjari, but a recent botanical reclassification split off some species formerly in Senecio, putting it and various other species in the new genus Dendrosenecio. Both genera are in the family Asteraceae. The giant groundsels of the genus Dendrosenecio evolved, about a million years ago, from a Senecio that established itself on Mount Kilimanjaro, with those that survived adapting into Dendrosenecio kilimanjari. This later colonised other mountains by some means—a standard distance for wind dispersal of seeds is a few metres—and these isolated populations adapted in ways different from the parent population, creating new species.

== Infraspecific name synonymy ==
The infraspecific names for the giant groundsels have become somewhat confusing:

- Dendrosenecio kilimanjari (Mildbr.) E.B.Knox subsp. cottonii (Hutch. & G.Taylor) E.B.Knox
  - Dendrosenecio johnstonii (Oliv.) B.Nord. subsp. cottonii (Hutch. & G.Taylor) B.Nord.
  - Senecio cottonii Hutch. & G.Taylor
  - Senecio johnstonii Oliv. subsp. cottonii (Hutch. & G.Taylor) Mabb.
  - Senecio johnstonii Oliv. var. cottonii (Hutch. & G.Taylor) C.Jeffrey
- Dendrosenecio kilimanjari (Mildbr.) E.B.Knox subsp. kilimanjari
  - Senecio johnstonii Oliv. var. kilimanjari (Mildbr.) C.Jeffrey
  - Senecio kilimanjari Mildbr.

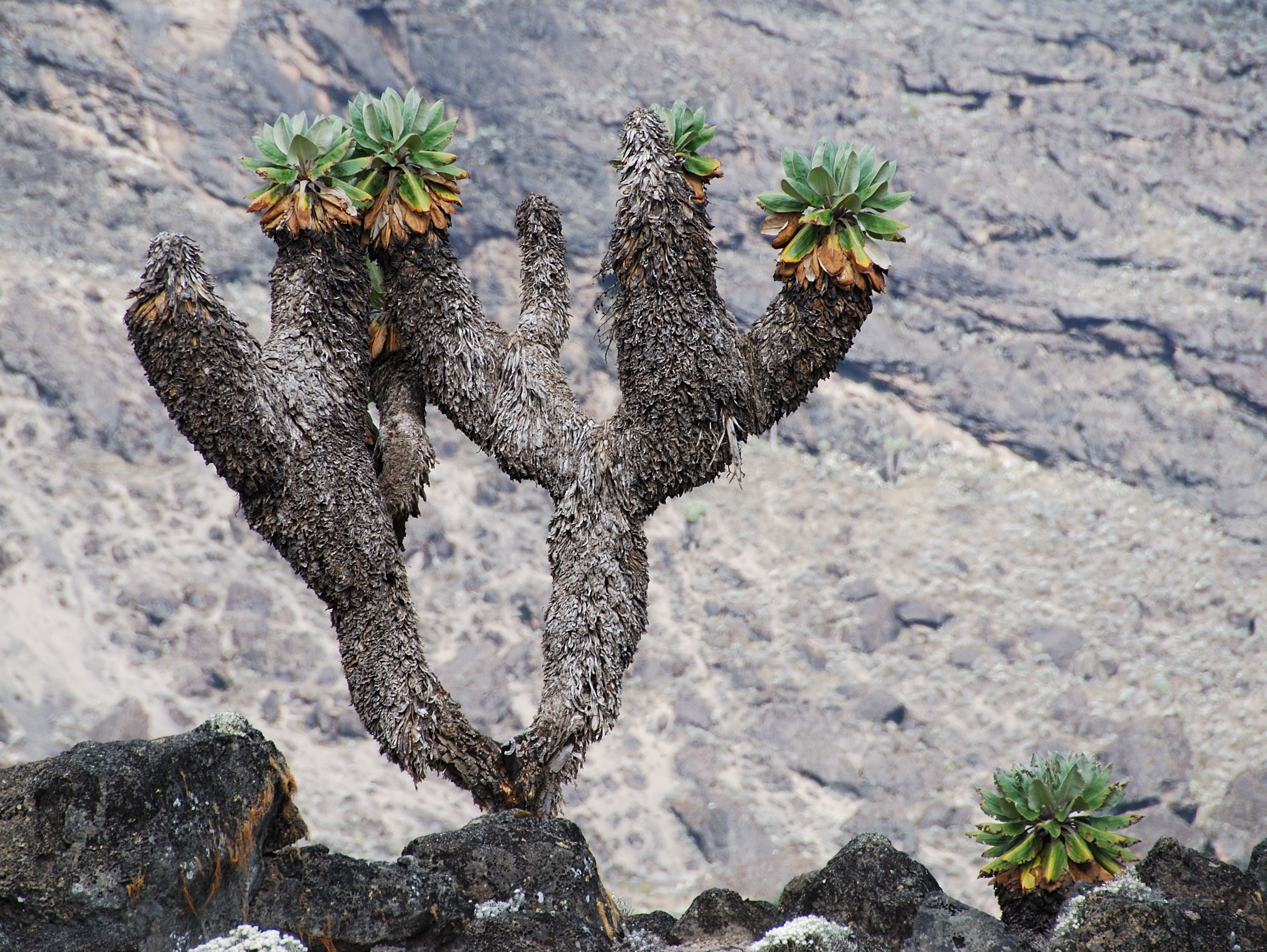
A large Dendrosenecio kilimanjari, near Barranco Camp, Kilimanjaro National Park, Tanzania
