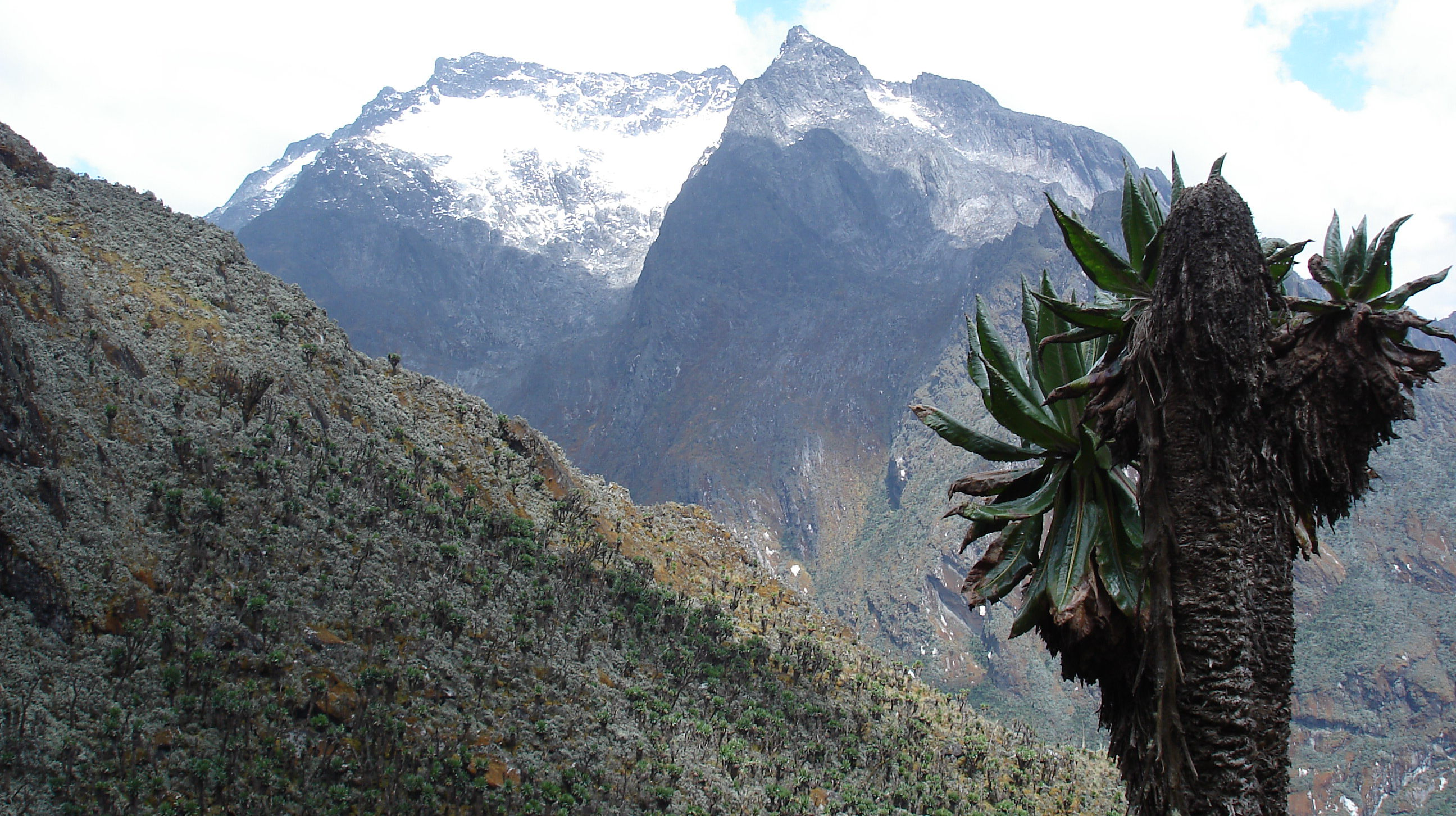
- Near Mount Speke

Conservation status
- Least Concern (IUCN 3.1)

Scientific classification
- Kingdom: Plantae
- Clade: Tracheophytes
- Clade: Angiosperms
- Clade: Eudicots
- Clade: Asterids
- Order: Asterales
- Family: Asteraceae
- Genus: Dendrosenecio
- Species: D. adnivalis

Binomial name
- Dendrosenecio adnivalis (Stapf) E.B.Knox

Synonyms
- Senecio adnivalis Stapf; Senecio erioneuron Cotton; Senecio refractisquamatus De Wild. Source

= Dendrosenecio adnivalis =

Species of flowering plant

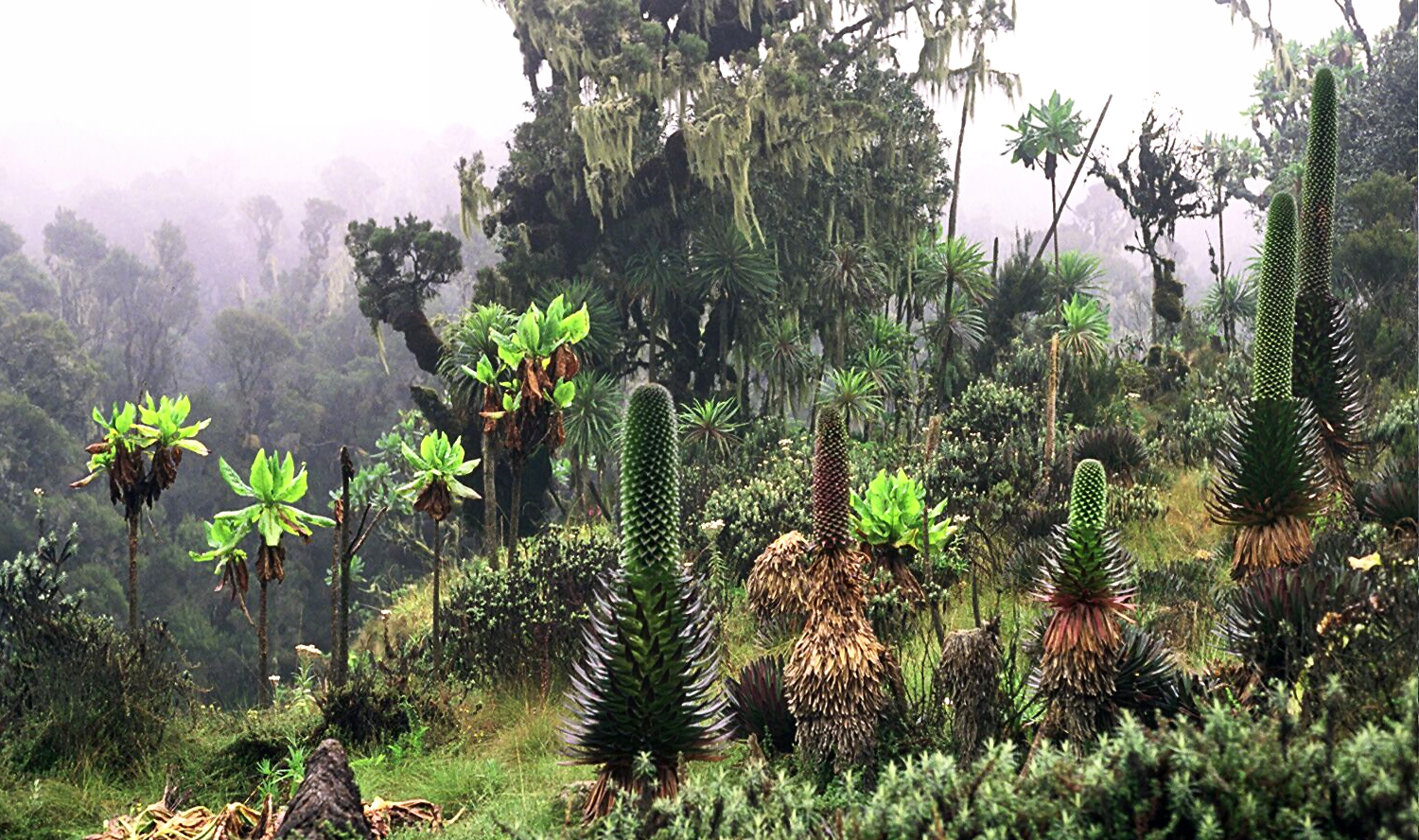
D. adnivalis (left) and lobelia on Rwenzori

Dendrosenecio adnivalis (synonym Senecio adnivalis) is one of the giant groundsels of the mountains of Eastern Africa. D. adnivalis grows on the Rwenzori Mountains and on the Virunga Mountains in Uganda and the Democratic Republic of Congo.

== Description ==
Dendrosenecio adnivalis attains heights of 6–10 m (20–33 ft) tall, trunk can be 40 centimeters diameter and the pith 3–4 cm (1.2–1.6 in) diameter. The stems have 25 to 60 leaves densely packed in a rosette shape at the top. Old leaves are persistent, withered leaf-bases covering the stalk for 1 to 3 meters below the leaf-rosettes. Leaf surfaces are elliptic to heart shaped and can be 96 cm (38 in) long and 26 cm (10 in) wide, hairy on the top and not hairy on the bottom. Branched clusters of flowers to 160 cm (63 in) tall and 60 cm (24 in) wide. The droopy flower heads have 9 to 20 ray florets, 16 millimeters long or no ray florets at all and 90 to 250 disc florets.

== Distribution ==
The Congo Basin is very wet; humid air is trapped by the mountains and rain falls on most days even in the drier months. Above 2,500 meters (8,200 feet) clouds can persist for several days making the Rwenzori and the Virunga a wetter environment than the other East African mountains. Dendrosenecio adnivalis lives at altitudes of 3,000 to 3,800 meters (9,800 to 12,500 ft) on the Rwenzori Mountains with another giant groundsel, Dendrosenecio johnstonii. D. adnivalis more common on the wetter soils.

On the Virunga Mountains groves of Senecio stanleyi (Dendrosenecio adnivalis) grow after the tree heaths (Erica sp.) in clearings along with Lobelia wollastonii until the altitude of 4,300 meters (14,100 feet) when vegetation becomes sparse.

== Synonyms ==
The herbarium has all of the Dendrosenecio adnivalis specimens filed under Senecio johnstonii and indeed, one is probably a variety or subspecies of the other that adapted to live closer to water and on damper ground.

A synonym for Senecio stanleyi is Dendrosenecio adnivalis (Stapf) E.B.Knox var. petiolatus (Hedberg) E.B.Knox; for this article, Senecio stanleyi was considered to be a synonym of Dendrosenecio adnivalis.
