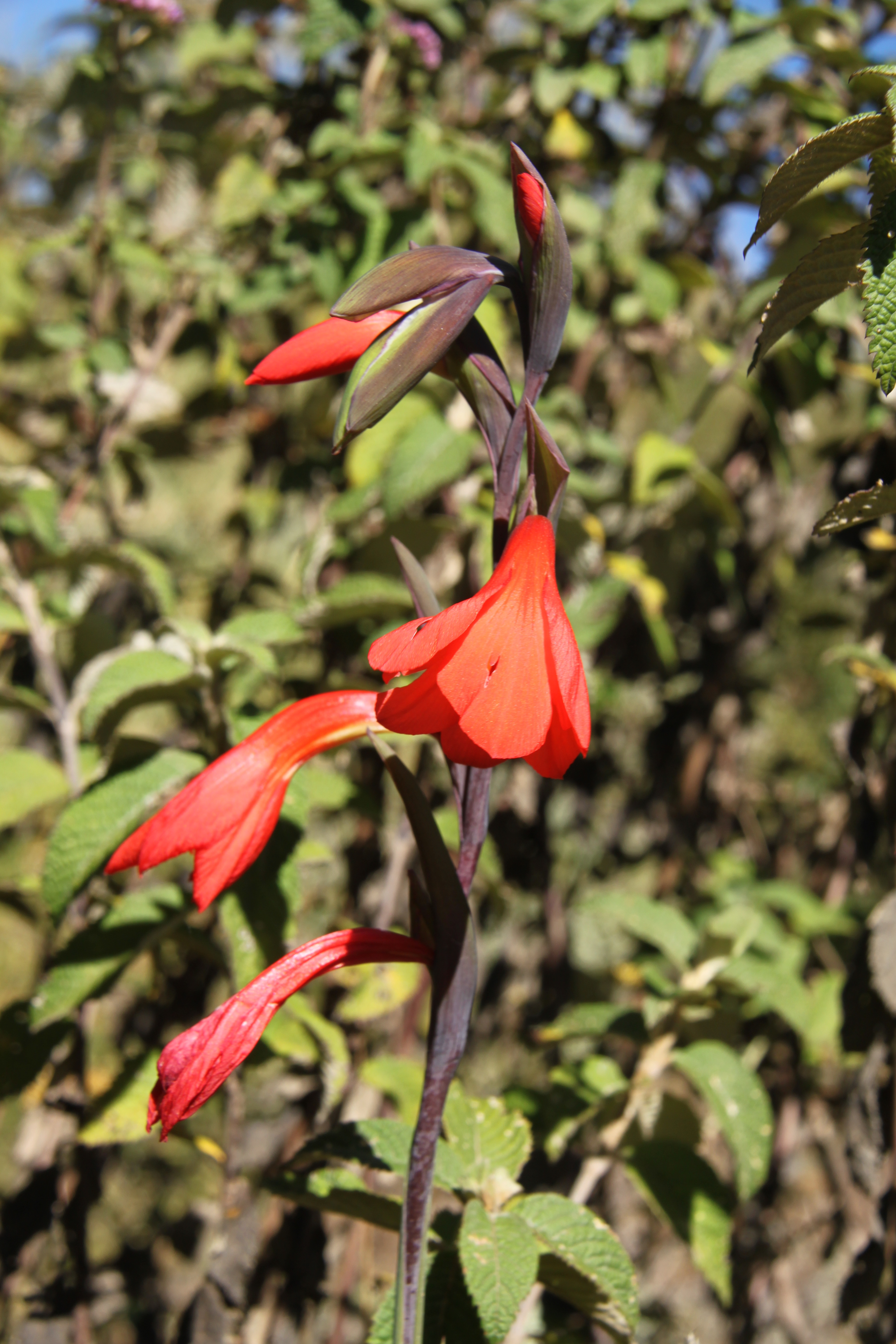

Scientific classification
- Kingdom: Plantae
- Clade: Tracheophytes
- Clade: Angiosperms
- Clade: Monocots
- Order: Asparagales
- Family: Iridaceae
- Genus: Gladiolus
- Species: G. watsonioides

Binomial name
- Gladiolus watsonioides Baker

Synonyms
- Antholyza watsonioides, Homoglossum watsonioides; G. watsonioides var. minor; Antholyza gracilis Pax, non G. gracilis Jaqc., Homoglossum gracile; G. mackinderi; Antholyza speciosa C.H.Wright, non G. speciosus Thunb., G. aberdaricus

= Gladiolus watsonioides =

Species of flowering plant from East Africa

Gladiolus watsonioides is a medium to high (½–1 m), herbaceous geophyte with sword-shaped leaves, flattened in the plain of the stem, and spikes of red funnel-shaped flowers, that is assigned to the iris family. In the wild, the species is restricted to the highlands of central Kenya and northern Tanzania, including on Kilimanjaro, Mount Kenya and the Aberdare Range. It is sometimes called Mackinder's gladiolus.

== Description ==
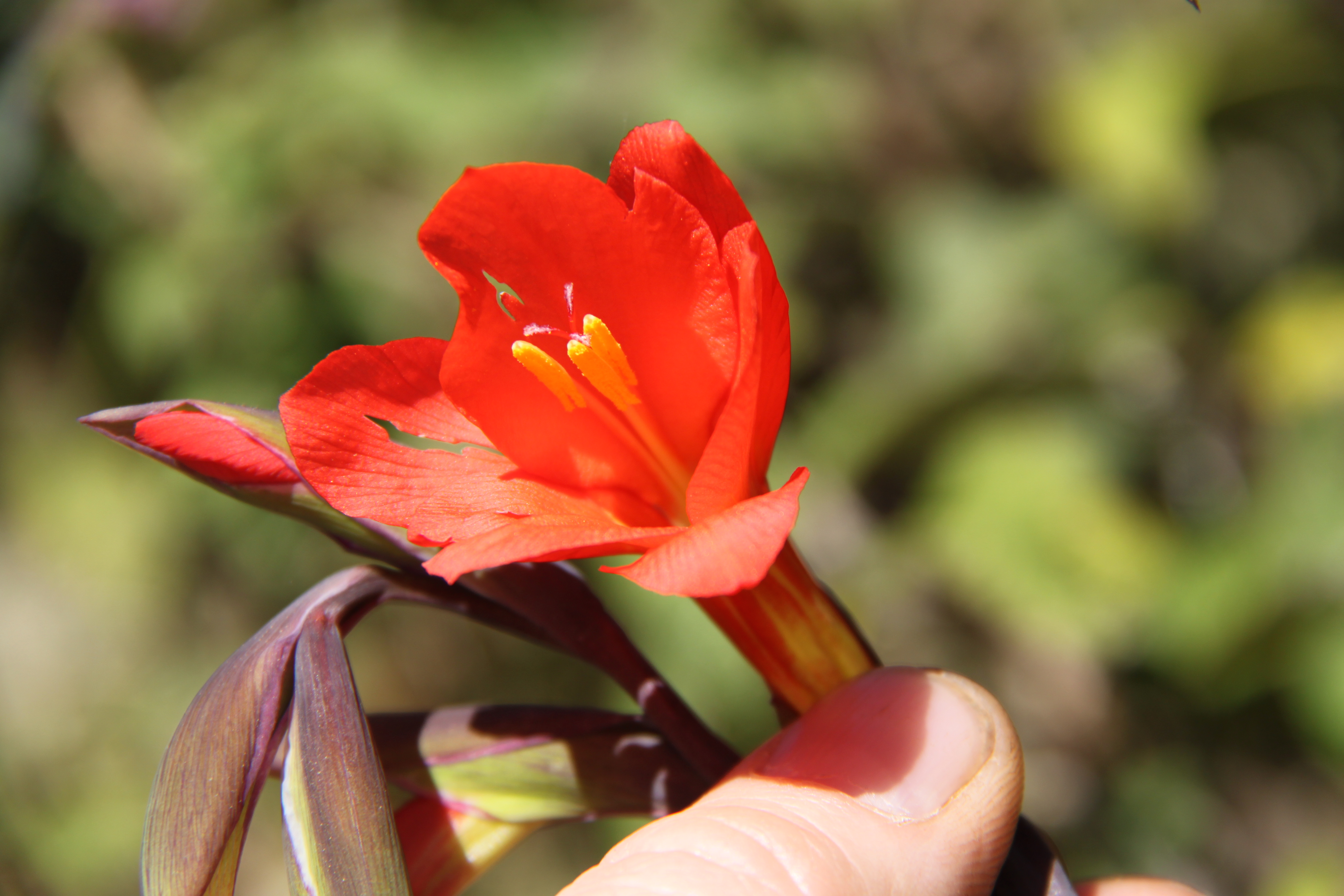
Detail of a flower

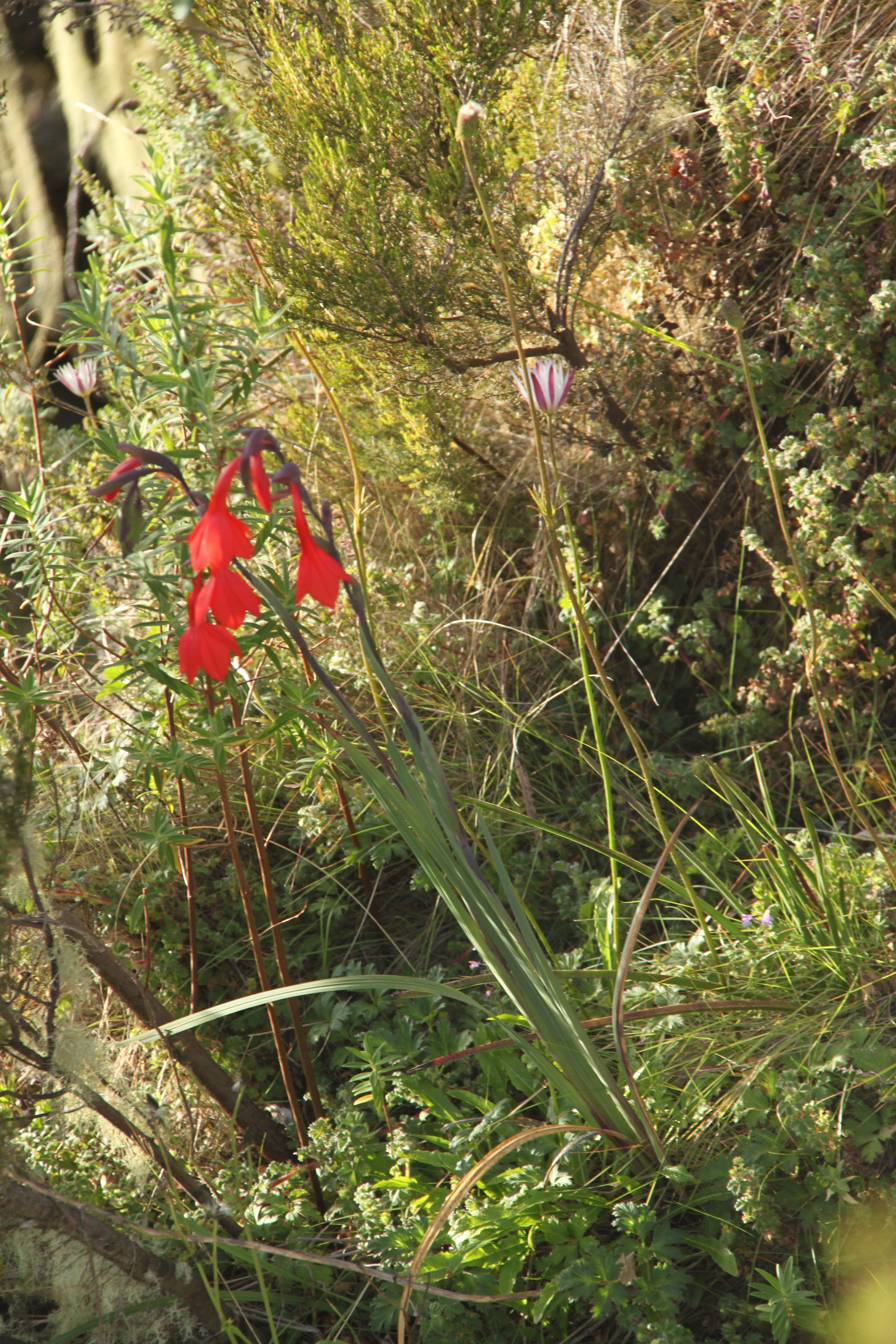
Habit

Gladiolus watsonioides is a medium to high, roughly ½–1 m, herbaceous geophyte with sword-shaped leaves, flattened in the plain of the stem, with spikes of red, curved, funnel-shaped, slightly bilaterally symmetrical flowers. Although G. watsonioides has underground storage, green plants can be seen all year round, due to the very even climate, with warm days and cold or frosty nights all year round.

=== Stems and leaves ===
At the base of the stem is a flattened fleshy corm of 1½–2 cm in diameter, which is surrounded by a reddish brown, firm to soft fibrous and membranous tunic, that eventually disintegrates into irregular fragments. Each stem typically carries five to seven leaves. The three or four leaves at the foot of the stem are linear to linear-lanceolate, mostly ½–1½ cm wide, commonly reaching to lowest flower or slightly beyond. The two or three leaves higher on the stem are shorter. The stem is mostly unbranched (seldom with one or two side-branches) and is 2–4 mm in diameter at the base of the lowest flower.

=== Inflorescence and flowers ===
The mostly six to fourteen flowers are set in a spike, each subtended by two green to dark purple flushed bracts, which are usually 4–7½ cm long at the low end and 1½–5 cm at the tip of the spike. The flowers are scarlet red, with some yellow on the inside, and green on the outside, near the base in a fresh flower. The tube, where the tepals are still merged, is erect, slender and cylindrical at the base where it is enclosed in the bracts, and this part is mostly 1½–2 cm long. It expands rather abruptly into a funnel-shaped upper part at a right angle with the stem of usually 1½–3 cm long and ½–¾ cm wide. The free parts of the tepals are not equal, the one furthest from the stem being slightly longer, ovate in shape, and usually 2½–4¼ cm long and 1¼–2⅓ cm wide. The tepals spread at approximately 45° from the flower axis. The filaments of the stamens are usually 1¾–2½ cm long, the free ends usually 1–1¼ cm, carrying the yellow usually 1–1¼ cm long anthers. The style divides into three whitish branches, each 3½–5 mm long, usually beyond the tip of the anthers. The fruit capsules are spheres to inverted egg-shaped, usually 2½–3 cm long. In its home range, most flowers can be seen from August to November, but flowering occurs throughout the year.

== Taxonomy ==
=== Taxonomic history ===
Gladiolus watsonioides was first described by John Gilbert Baker in 1885, based on a specimen collected by Joseph Thomson from Mount Kilimanjaro in Tanzania, and now housed at Kew. A specimen, differing in having smaller flowers, was described in 1892 by Baker himself as G. watsonioides var. minor. Also in 1892, Ferdinand Albin Pax described Antholyza gracilis, which is different from Gladiolus gracilis, as described by Nikolaus Joseph von Jacquin already in 1792. Baker agreed with the assignment of his species to the genus Antholyza, but had to create the new combination A. watsonioides in 1898, to satisfy the International Code of Nomenclature for algae, fungi, and plants. In 1902, Joseph Dalton Hooker described Gladiolus mackinderi based on a specimen cultivated at Kew Gardens in 1901, which had been collected on Mount Kenya by Halford Mackinder. Charles Henry Wright described a plant from the Aberdare range as Antholyza speciosa in 1935, which is not the same as Gladiolus speciosus that was described by Carl Peter Thunberg back in 1811. Nicholas Edward Brown renamed the same plant to Gladiolus aberdaricus in 1932, and also suggested to call Baker’s species Homoglossum watsonioides, and the species of Pax Homoglossum gracile.

=== Modern classification ===
Species that were assigned to Antholyza and Homoglossum are currently regarded to not diverge sufficiently to justify their separation from Gladiolus. The difference between the typical G. watsonioides and its var. minor is now regarded a result of less favorable growing conditions within the same genotype. All of these names are now considered synonymous.

=== Etymology ===
The species epithet watsonioides refers to a resemblance to another plant in the iris family, Watsonia.

== Distribution ==
Mackinder's gladiolus is restricted to the highlands of central Kenya and northern Tanzania. In Kenya, it is known from Nakuru County, Fort Hall and Nyeri Districts, including Mount Kenya, while in Tanzania it can only be found in the Arusha and Mbulu Districts, including the Kilimanjaro and Meru, and on Mount Hanang.

== Habitat ==
Mackinder's gladiolus can be found on mountain slopes above the forest zone, among the shrubs of the Erica arborea-zone, in lava rubble, and in glades in juniper forest. It can be found at altitudes between 2,000–4,200 m (6,600–13,800 ft).

== Cultivation ==
Gladiolus watsonioides grows well in gritty and humus-rich compost in deep pots if kept in a frost-free greenhouse.
