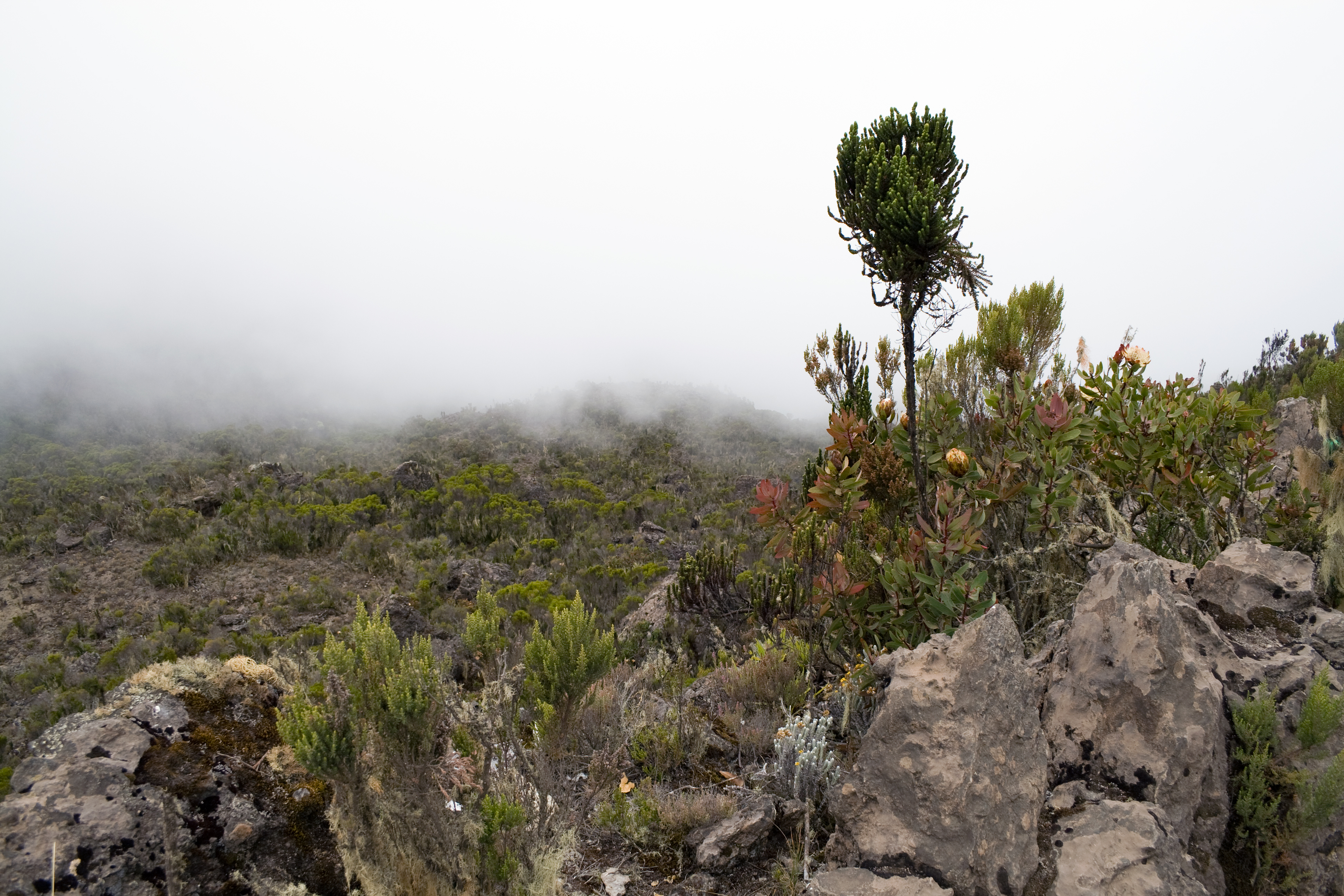

Conservation status
- Least Concern (IUCN 3.1)

Scientific classification
- Kingdom: Plantae
- Clade: Tracheophytes
- Clade: Angiosperms
- Clade: Eudicots
- Clade: Asterids
- Order: Ericales
- Family: Ericaceae
- Genus: Erica
- Species: E. rossii

Binomial name
- Erica rossii Dorr

= Erica rossii =

Species of plant

Erica rossii is a species of plant in the family Ericaceae. The species occurs in a number of Afromontane zones of East Africa.

== Description ==
Like many Erica species, Erica rossii is pyrophyte (fire-resistant). The plant closely resembles the related Erica arborea and grows into a highly branched shrub or small tree, reaching a height of 30 cm to 1500 cm.

The trunk reaches a maximum diameter of 15 centimeters. It has dark brown bark, and the branches are covered with tiny hairs, approximately 0.4 millimeters long. The fleshy, oval leaves grow in whorls of three. They often shine due to the oil-rich resin they secrete.

Red buds grow in clusters of three to nine at the ends of the branches. When in bloom, the branches bear red to greenish-white flowers 1 to 2.5 millimeters long.

== Distribution ==
Erica rossii is widespread in the Afromontane zones of the Rwenzori Mountains, the Virunga Mountains, the Aberdare Mountains, Mount Elgon, Mount Kenya, Mount Hanang, Mount Meru and Kilimanjaro. It also occurs on mountains in the Democratic Republic of the Congo and Rwanda. The species has been found at altitudes of 1800 to 4050 metres.
