= Ralph Anthony Blakelock =

- Born: 1915
- Died: 1963 (aged 47–48)
- Occupation: Botanist

Ralph Anthony Blakelock (1915–1963) was a British botanist. He particularly focused on the research of spermatophites.
