= Thore Christian Elias Fries =

1886–1930, Swedish biologist

Thore Christian Elias Fries (3 November 1886 – 31 December 1930 son of Theodor Magnus Fries and brother of Robert Elias Fries) was Professor of Systematic Botany at Lund University. He specialised in lichenology and plant geography. This botanist is denoted by the author abbreviation T.C.E.Fr. when citing a botanical name. He did his field work and travelled in India and Africa

He was a member of the British Mycological Society and associated with many botanical gardens and other museums.
