= Eric B. Knox =

Eric B. Knox (Ph.D., University of Michigan, 1993) is a Research Scientist at the Indiana University Biology Department and the Director of the Indiana University Herbarium where he optimizes laboratory protocols and studies the flora of Indiana.
