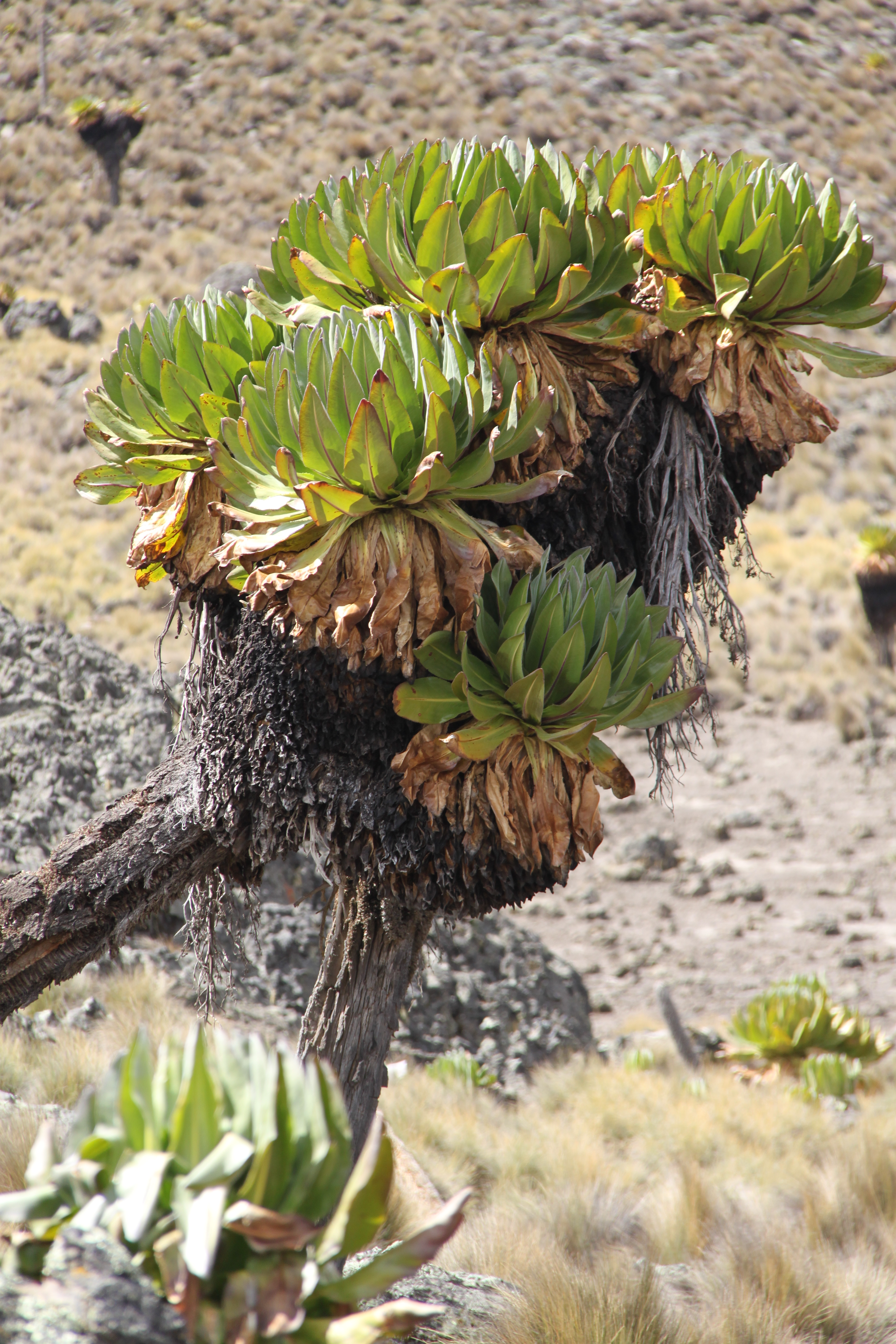

Conservation status
- Least Concern (IUCN 3.1)

Scientific classification
- Kingdom: Plantae
- Clade: Tracheophytes
- Clade: Angiosperms
- Clade: Eudicots
- Clade: Asterids
- Order: Asterales
- Family: Asteraceae
- Genus: Dendrosenecio
- Species: D. keniodendron

Binomial name
- Dendrosenecio keniodendron (R.E.Fr. & T.C.E.Fr.) B.Nord.
- Range of D. keniodendron in the Afrotropics

Synonyms
- Senecio keniodendron R.E.Fr. & T.C.E.Fr.

= Dendrosenecio keniodendron =

Giant groundsel

Species of flowering plant

Dendrosenecio keniodendron or giant groundsel is a species of the genus Dendrosenecio of the large family Asteraceae and is one of the several species of giant groundsels endemic to the high altitudes of the Afrotropics, including Dendrosenecio johnstonii (Senecio battiscombei) occurring on Mount Kilimanjaro, Mount Kenya, and the Aberdare Mountains, Dendrosenecio keniensis occurring the lower alpine zone of Mount Kenya and D. keniodendron occurring in higher and drier sites on Mount Kenya. The giant rosette plants, sometimes 6 metres (20 ft) tall, often grow in even-sized stands (presumably even-aged), with different understory communities under different-aged stands.

== Description ==
Dendrosenecio keniodendron is a giant rosette plant occurring at altitudes between 3,900 metres (12,800 ft) and 4,500 metres (14,800 ft). D. keniensis grows in wetter sites, and therefore at lower altitudes on average, but their ranges abut and they occasionally hybridise.

Leaves and stems: D. keniodendron has woody stems up to 8 metres (26 ft) tall and 50 centimetres (20 in) in diameter with an 8 centimetres (3.1 in) diameter pith. that grow 1 centimetre (0.39 in) to 5 centimetres (2.0 in) per year. Its 1-15 evergreen rosettes which grow from the top of the stout stems are composed of 50–100 leaves each 82 centimetres (32 in) long and 22 centimetres (8.7 in) wide. The upper leaf-base has long, yellowish hairs, sometimes extending along upper midvein; the lower surface hairless or with sparse hairs becoming more dense along lower midvein. Leaf longevity is less than a year.

D. keniodendron protects itself against freezing temperatures by closing its leaves when it becomes cold (at night) and opening them when it is warm (during the day); an adaptive insulation method sometimes called nyctinasty, or a night bud. The older outer leaves freeze while the younger inner meristematic buds remain above the freezing point.

Flowers: A reproductive rosette produces a single terminal flower stalk as much as 2 metres (6.6 ft) tall. Flower clusters are loosely branched below and gradually simpler toward the end to 250 centimetres (98 in) tall, 120 centimetres (47 in) in diameter; with flower heads that bend downwards. Ray florets absent; 80–140 disc florets.

Flowers are predominantly wind pollinated and the original rosette dies after seed maturation, and up to eight new rosettes are produced around the flower stalk base. Up to five of these new lateral rosettes survive (typically 2-3), each producing a new branch. Each flowering episode therefore results in new forks in the stem. Branching occurs only after flowering, and so provides a record of past reproduction. These branching patterns suggest that plants seldom reproduce more than 4 times before dying.

Fruits: Flowers produce plumed achenes which are wind-dispersed. Reproduction occurs synchronously over the entire population on Mount Kenya, at intervals of 5 to 29 years, making D. keniodendron a mast year species.

Communities: In the alpine zone of Mount Kenya, Dendrosenecio keniodendron is the dominant woody species, forming evenly sized and evenly aged dense stands with nearly closed canopies. The taller stands tend to support a community of the shrubs from the genus Alchemilla: Alchemilla argyrophylla and Alchemilla johnstonii and shorter stands supporting grasses from the genus Festuca and Carex: Festuca pilgeri and Carex monostachya which resemble each other and have perhaps been often misidentified. Also found in these communities are the species pairs: from Poa: Poa schimperi and Poa leptoclada, Cerastium: Cerastium octandrum and Cerastium afromontanum, and the pair of Ericas: Erica timera and Erica arborea.

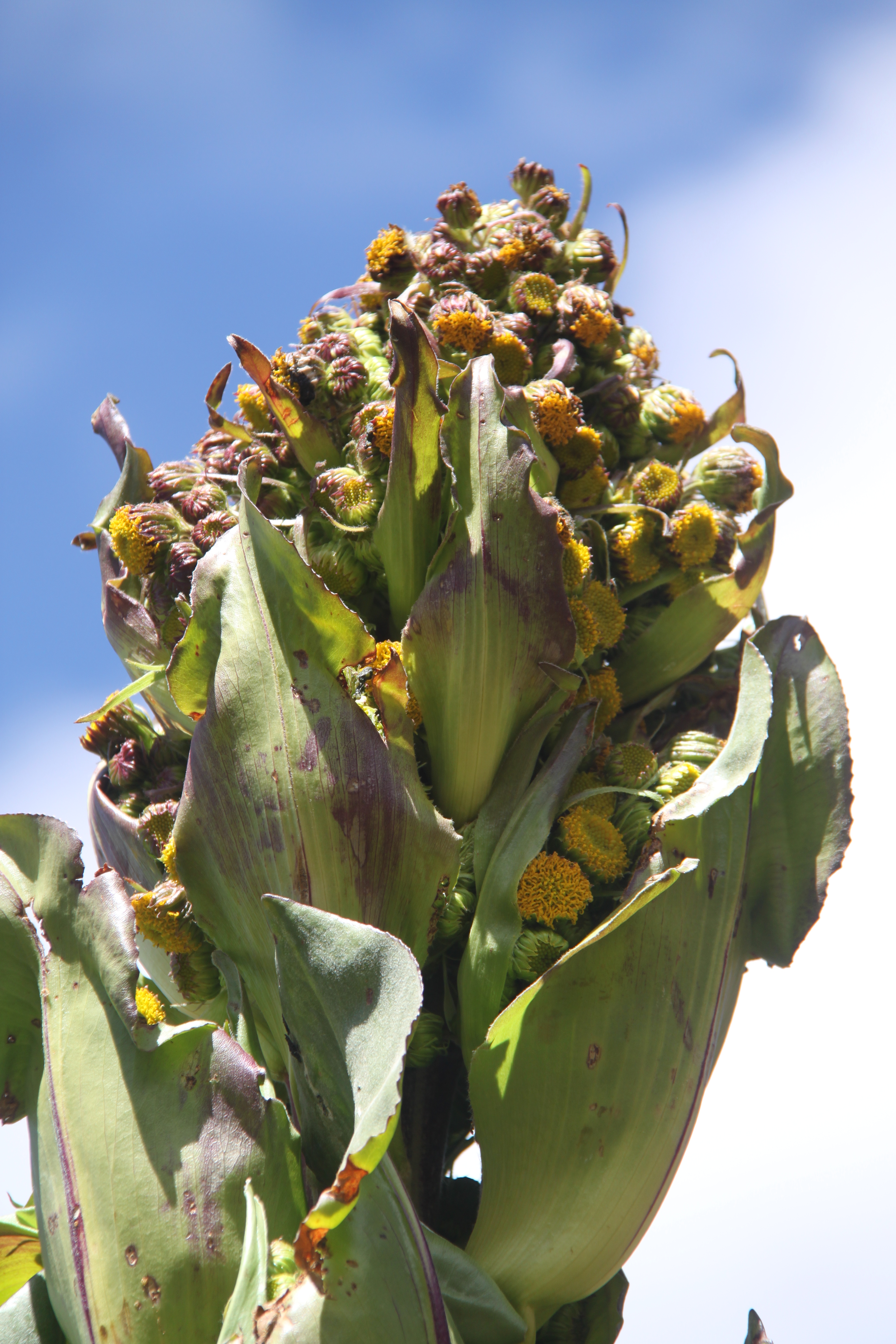
detail of inflorescence, just starting to flower

== Distribution ==
Found in the higher altitudes of Mount Kenya.

D. keniodendron is endemic to valley slopes and ridges in the alpine zone of Mount Kenya. 0 degrees latitude at altitudes of 3,700 metres (12,100 ft) and 4,500 metres (14,800 ft).

== Predators ==
- Cape hyrax or rock hyrax (Procavia capensis) or (Procavia johnstoni mackinderi)
- African bush elephant (Loxodonta africana)

== Other giant rosette plants endemic to Mount Kenya ==
- Lobelia keniensis or Lobelia deckenii
- Dendrosenecio keniensis
- Lobelia telekii
- Carduus keniensis
