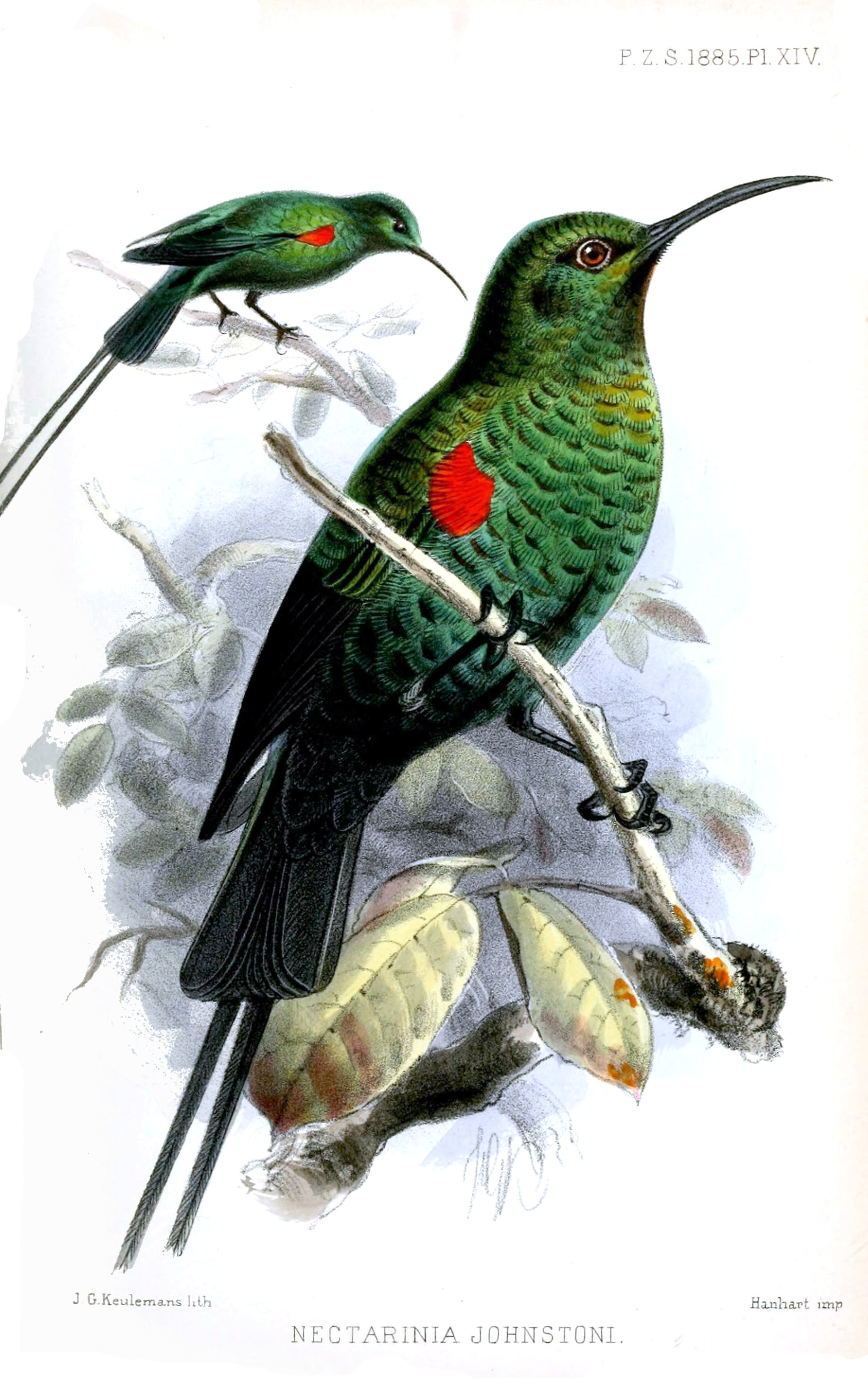

Conservation status
- Least Concern (IUCN 3.1)

Scientific classification
- Kingdom: Animalia
- Phylum: Chordata
- Class: Aves
- Order: Passeriformes
- Family: Nectariniidae
- Genus: Nectarinia
- Species: N. johnstoni

Binomial name
- Nectarinia johnstoni Shelley, 1885

= Scarlet-tufted sunbird =

Species of bird

The scarlet-tufted sunbird (Nectarinia johnstoni) is a species of bird in the Nectarinia of the family Nectariniidae. It is found in Democratic Republic of the Congo, Kenya, Malawi, Rwanda, Tanzania, Uganda, and Zambia. It is also known as the red-tufted sunbird and the scarlet-tufted malachite sunbird.

== Description ==
The scarlet-tufted sunbird is a large sunbird. Adult males have long tails, up to about 20 centimetres (7.9 in) in length, and scarlet pectoral tufts up to about 10 millimetres (0.39 in) wide. These tufts can be seen in flight and when the wings are rearranged, but not in perched birds. The head is black and the upper parts are metallic green, appearing almost black from a distance. The rump is bluish and the wings and tail black, the latter having elongated central feathers. The underparts are iridescent green, fading to bluish-violet on the upper belly and black on the lower belly. The female has brownish-grey upper parts, brownish-black wings and a dark brown tail. The underparts are whitish with dark mottling. The pectoral tufts are smaller than those of the male and may be rather more orangey-red. The juvenile is similar to the adult female but lacks the pectoral tufts.

== Distribution and habitat ==
The scarlet-tufted sunbird is found at very high altitudes in the Afroalpine Rwenzori-Virunga montane moorlands, East African montane moorlands and Viphya Mountains. Its normal range is on several disjunct areas of montane forest and moorland between 3,000 and 4,500 m (9,843 and 14,764 ft) in altitude, which encompasses a number of zones of vegetation. It is especially associated with giant lobelia, feeding on the nectar and insects on the plants, and using the tall flowerheads as song-posts. At lower altitudes it feeds on Protea and other plants.

== Status ==
The scarlet-tufted sunbird is a common species with a small range, and the population trend is thought to be steady. No particular threats have been identified and the International Union for Conservation of Nature has assessed the bird's conservation status as being of "least concern".

== Gallery ==
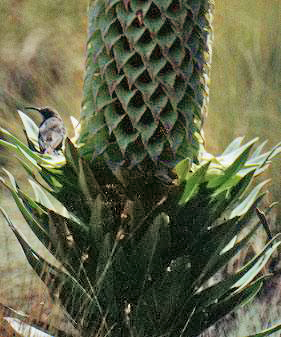
On a Lobelia deckenii plant

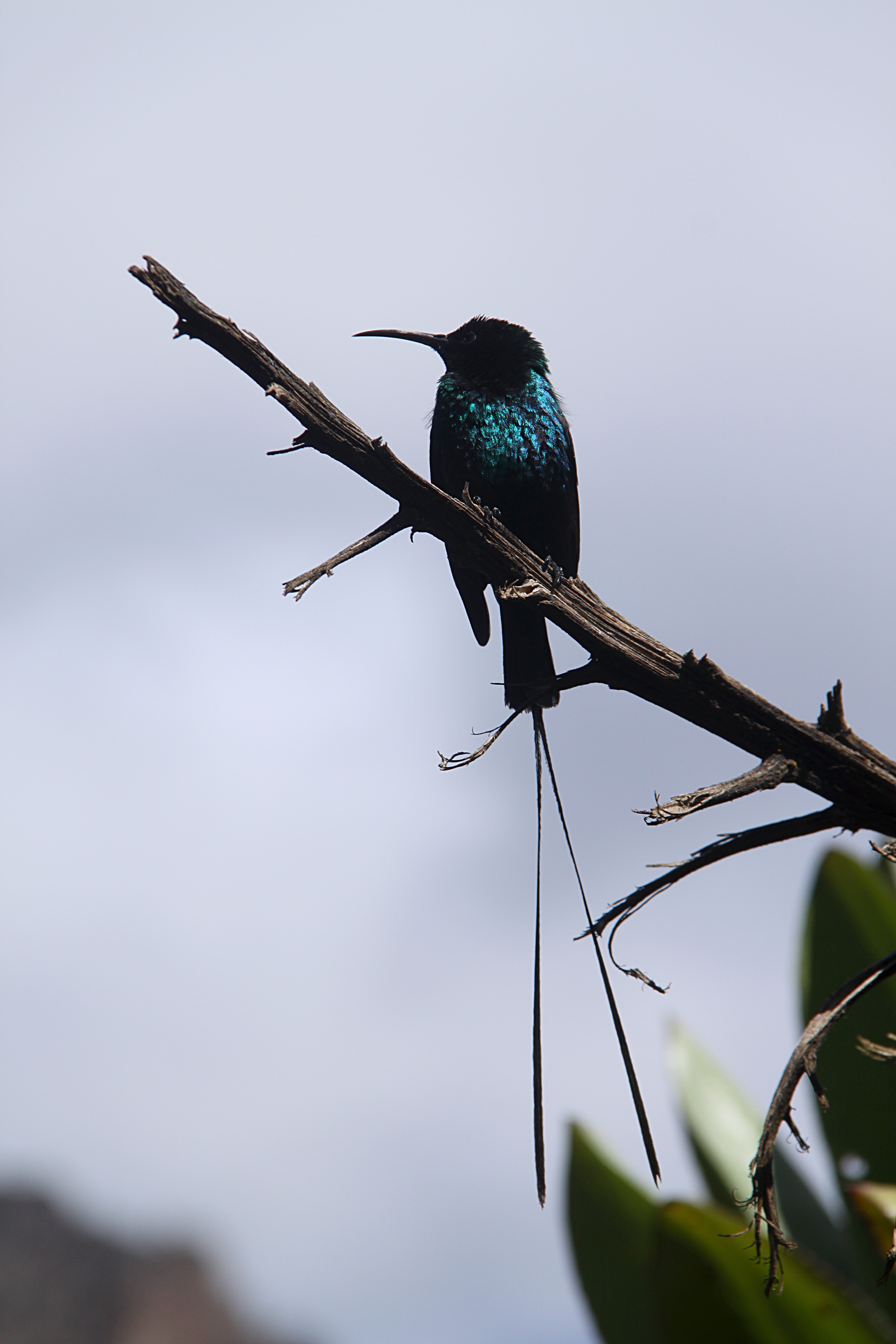

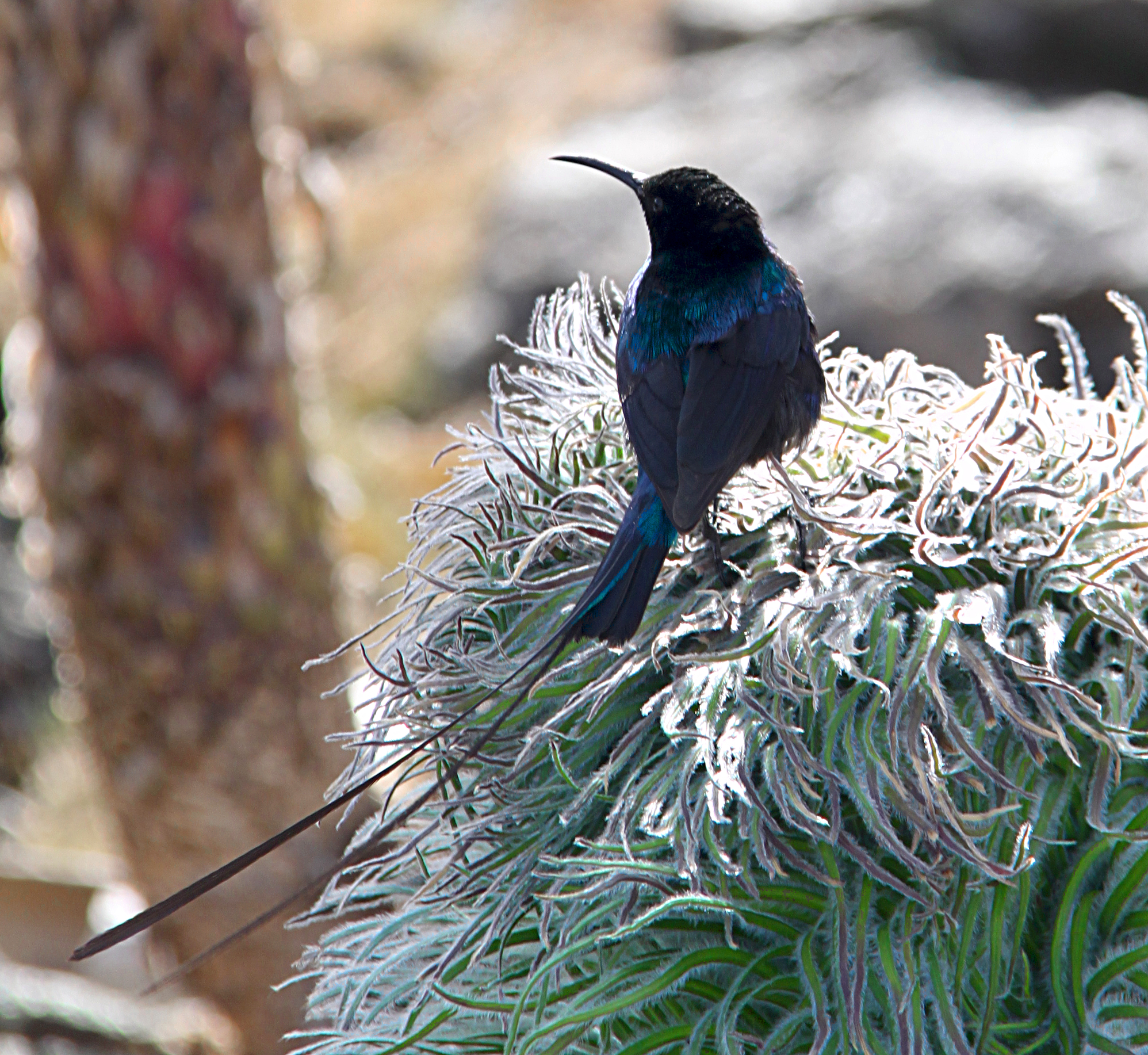

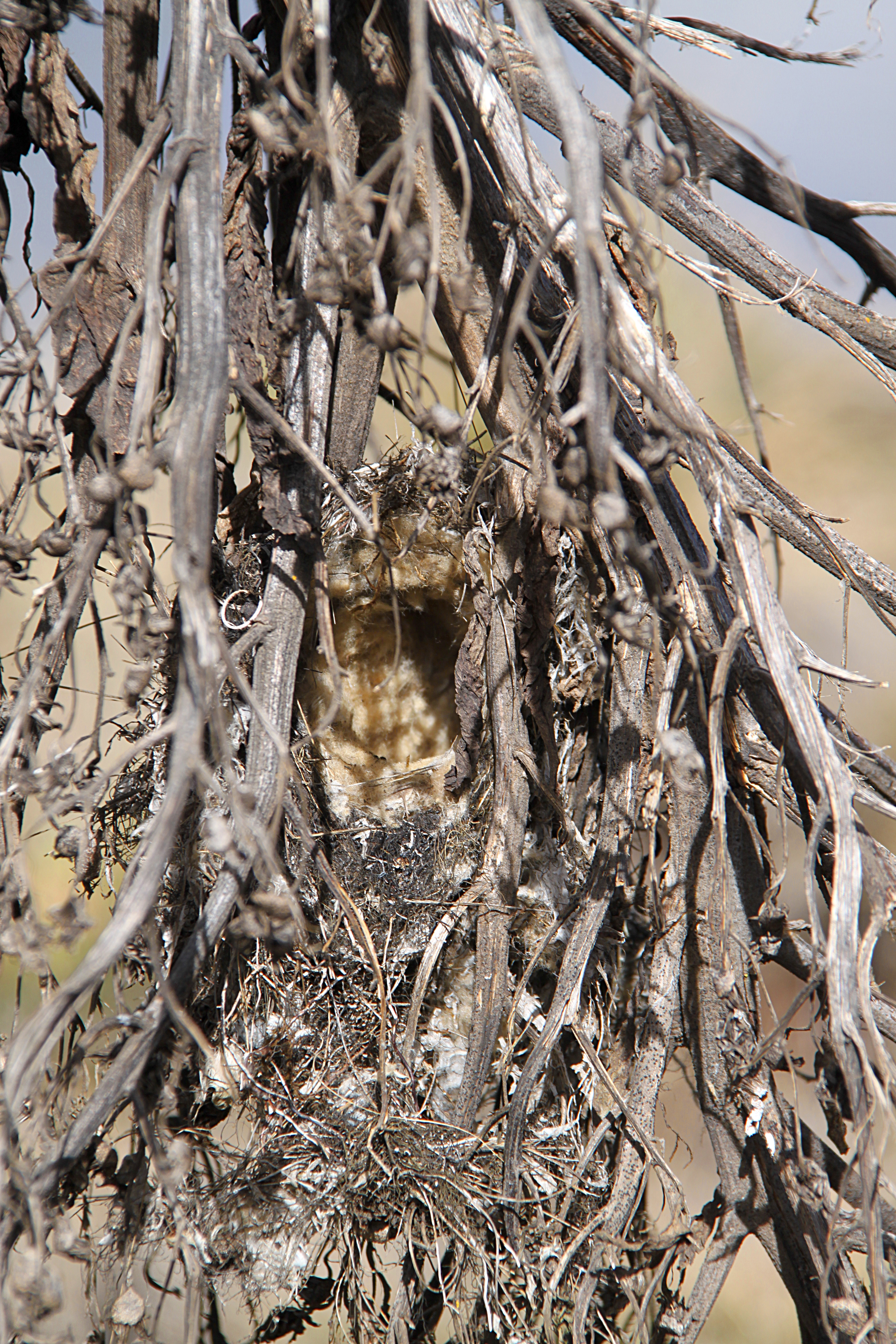
Nest
