= Cherangani Hills Forest =

Set of forest reserve blocks in western Kenya

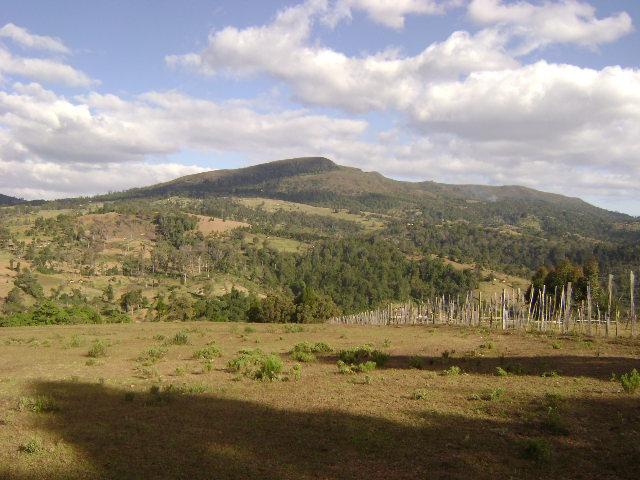
View of the hills

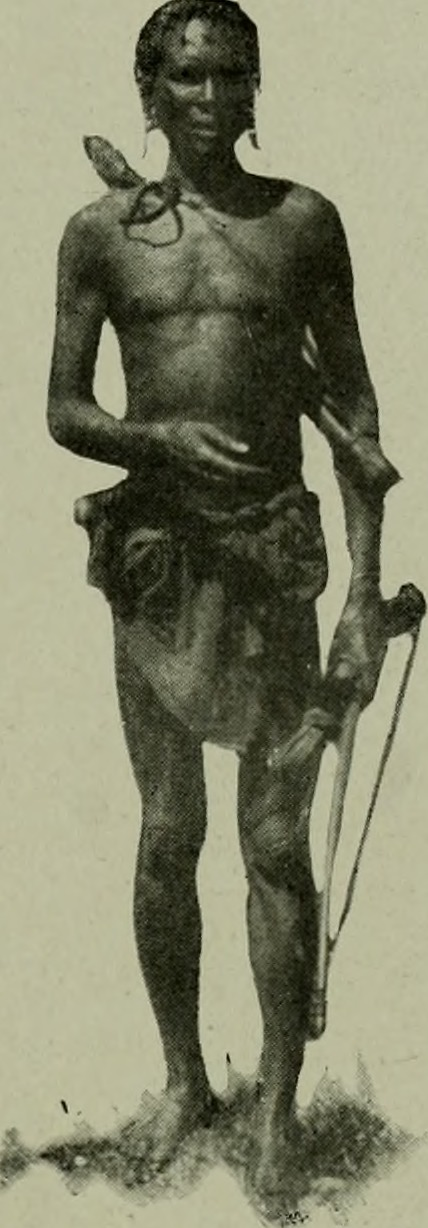
A member of the Dorobo, c. 1913, poison-hunters who inhabited small hill villages.

Cherangani Hills Forest (Cherangany Hills Forest) is a collection of thirteen forest reserve blocks in western Kenya, located in the Cherangani Hills on the western ridge of the East African Rift. The forested area is about 1,200 square kilometres (463 sq mi), 956 square kilometres (369 sq mi) of which has been gazetted into forest reserves. These forest reserves form the upper catchments of the Kerio and Nzoia and Turkwel rivers.

== Forest types ==
The three western blocks, Kapkanyar, Kapolet and Kiptaberr, are larger and more consolidated and constitute about 20% of the Cherangani Hills Forest. Most of the rest of the forests are fragmented, cut by grasslands, bushlands, and croplands. The forests themselves are quite varied in composition. To the west, the lower elevations are "Aningeria-Strombosia-Drypetes" forest, grading into mixed Podocarpus milanjianus forest on the higher elevations. To the east are "Juniperus–Nuxia–Afrocarpus falcatus" forest, particularly on south facing slopes. On the eastern slopes these are interspersed with Afrocarpus falcatus forest, much disturbed by human activities. sizeable remnants of "Juniperus–Maytenus undata–Rapanea–Hagenia" forest can be found in the high valleys. In some of the stream valleys tree ferns such as Cyathea manniana can be found as well as small patches of the bamboo Yushania alpina.

== Forest blocks ==
- Kapkanyar Forest Reserve, 01°11′N 35°16′E
- Kapolet Forest Reserve, 01°10′N 35°10′E
- Kiptaberr Forest Reserve, 01°05′N 35°18′E
- Lelan Forest Reserve, 01°17′N 35°27′E
- Embobut Forest Reserve, 01°15′N 35°35′E
- Kerrer Forest Reserve,
- Kaisungurr Forest Reserve, 01°03′N 35°26′E
- Toropket Forest Reserve, 01°01′N 35°26′E
- Chemurokoi Forest Reserve,
- Kupkunurr Forest Reserve,
- Cheboit Forest Reserve,
- Sogotio Forest Reserve, 00°56′01″N 35°32′13″E and
- Kapchemutwa Forest Reserve 00°50′31″N 35°32′14″E

== Flora and fauna ==
In total, 1296 species, including 17 endemic species have been documented found in the Cherangani Hills Forest, belonging to 130 families and 608 genera. This flora represents 18.50% of the Kenyan species, 43.83% of the Kenyan genera and 54.17% of the Kenyan families. Threatened plants include; Peucedanum aculeolatum Engl., Pimpinella lindblomii H. Wolff, Polyscias kikuyuensis Summerh., Ethulia vernonioides (Schweinf.) M.G. Gilbert, Euryops brownei S. Moore, Gutenbergia rueppellii Sch. Bip., Senecio pseudosubsessilis C. Jeffrey, S. rhammatophyllus Mattf., Helichrysum meyeri-johannis Engl., Guizotia jacksonii (S. Moore) J. Baagøe., Impatiens hoehnelii T.C.E. Fr., Impatiens meruensis Gilg, I. pseudoviola Gilg, I. tinctoria A. Rich., Cynoglossum cheranganiense Verdc., Lobelia aberdarica R.E. Fr. & T.C.E. Fr., L. cheranganiensis Thulin, Lobelia deckenii (Asch.) Hemsl., L. duriprati T.C.E. Fr., Wahlenbergia scottii Thulin, Euphorbia brevicornu Pax, Trifolium cheranganiense J.B. Gillett, Hypericum kiboense Oliv., Galega lindblomii (Harms) J.B. Gillett, Abutilon mauritianum (Jacq.) Medik., Diaphananthe montana (Piers) P.J. Cribb & J. Stewart, Habenaria altior Rendle, Polystachya bella Summerh., Calamagrostis hedbergii Melderis, Delphinium macrocentrum Oliv., Rubus scheffleri Engl., Galium kenyanum Verdc. Spermacoce minutiflora (K. Schum.) Verdc. and Cyphostemma cyphopetalum (Fresen.) Desc. ex Wild & R.B. Drumm.

== Conservation ==
The Cherangani Hills Forest is threatened by increased pressures from a growing local population, as well as by pressure from downstream inhabitants. The problems range from overgrazing, to conversion of the forest to cropland, to excessive use of forest products in making charcoal and providing local lumber.

== Gallery ==
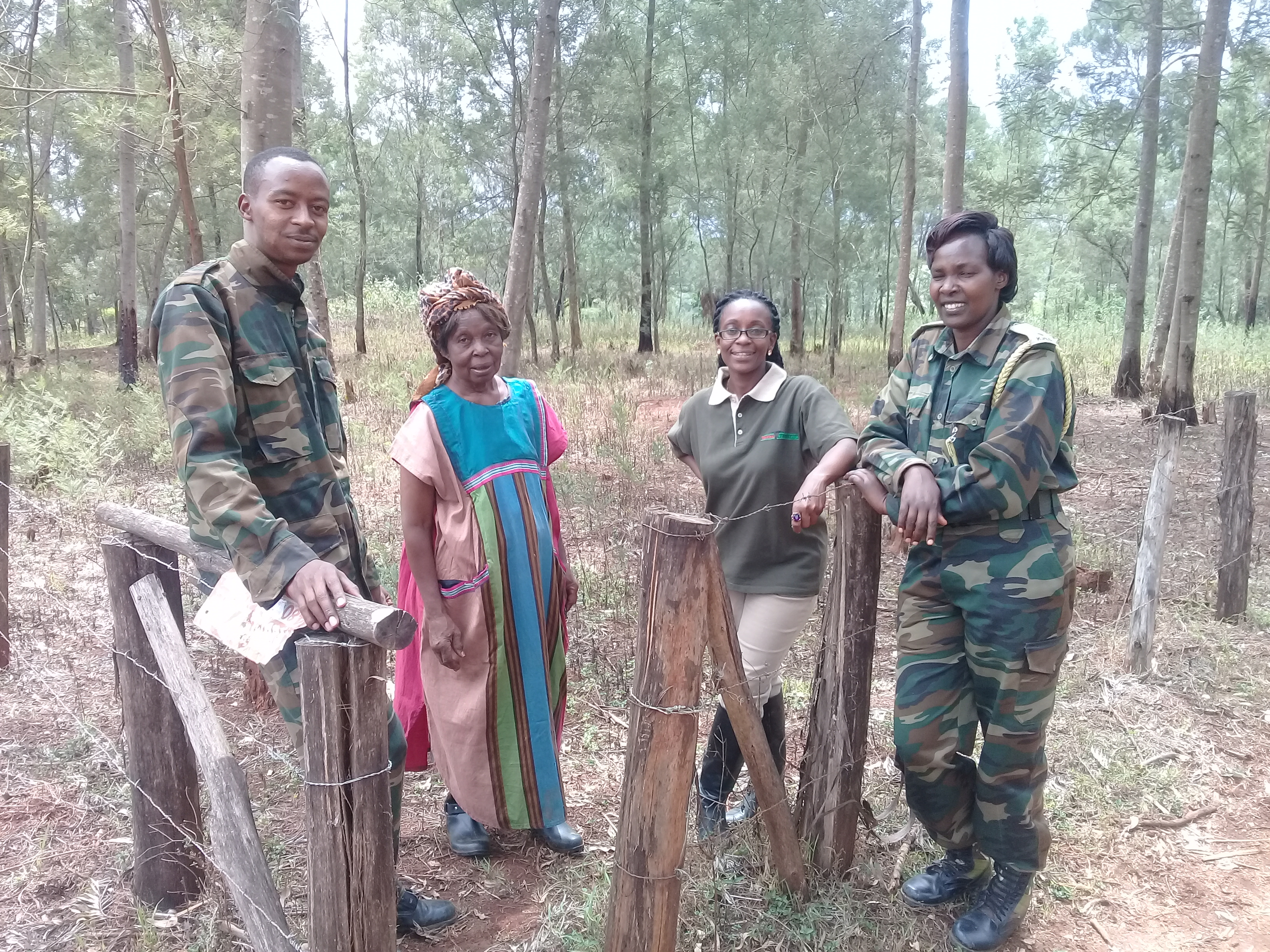
Environmentalist Rachel Nyakeri and Wildlife Society officials identify invasive vegetation

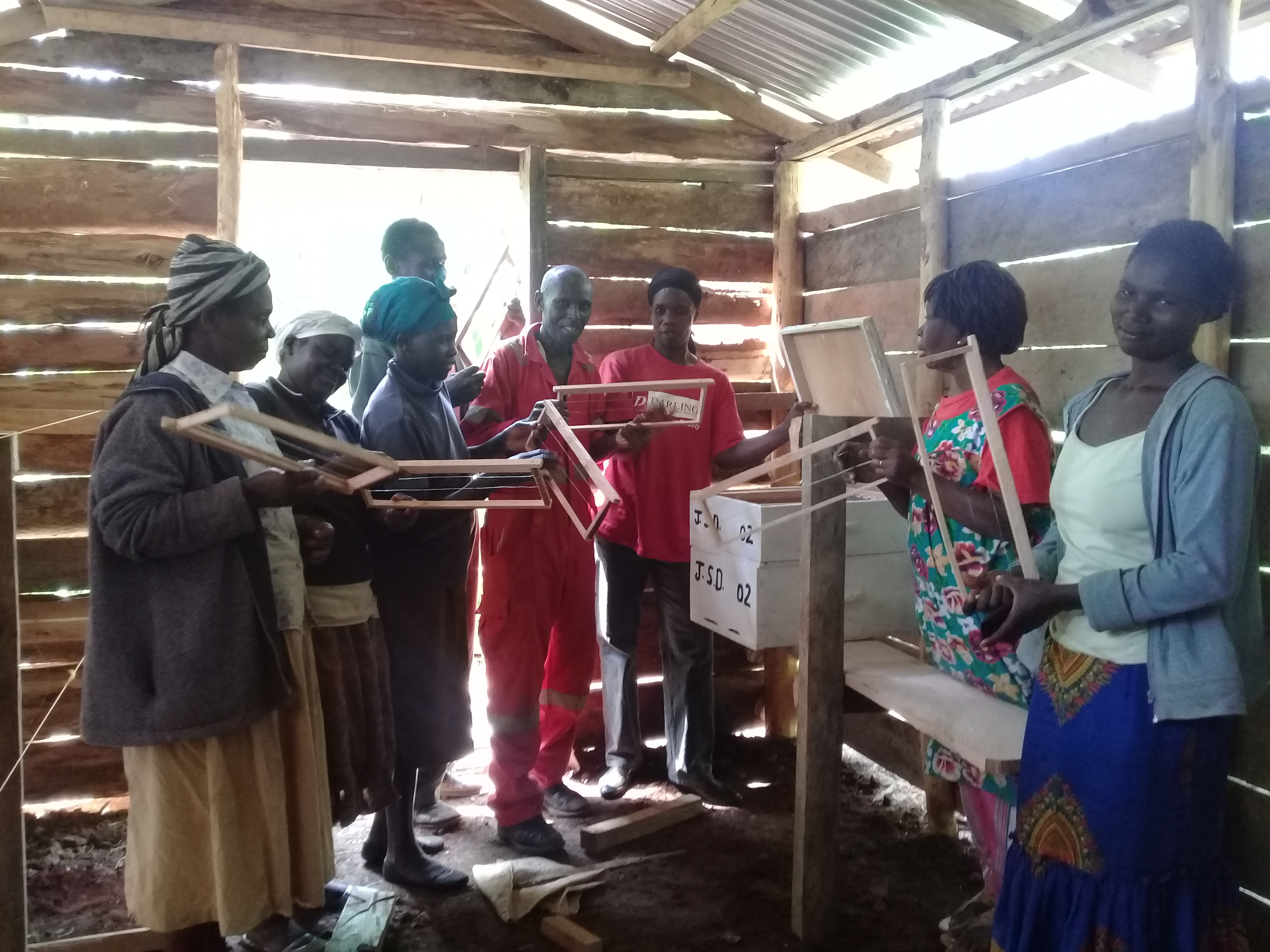
Bee-keeping project to curb deforestation

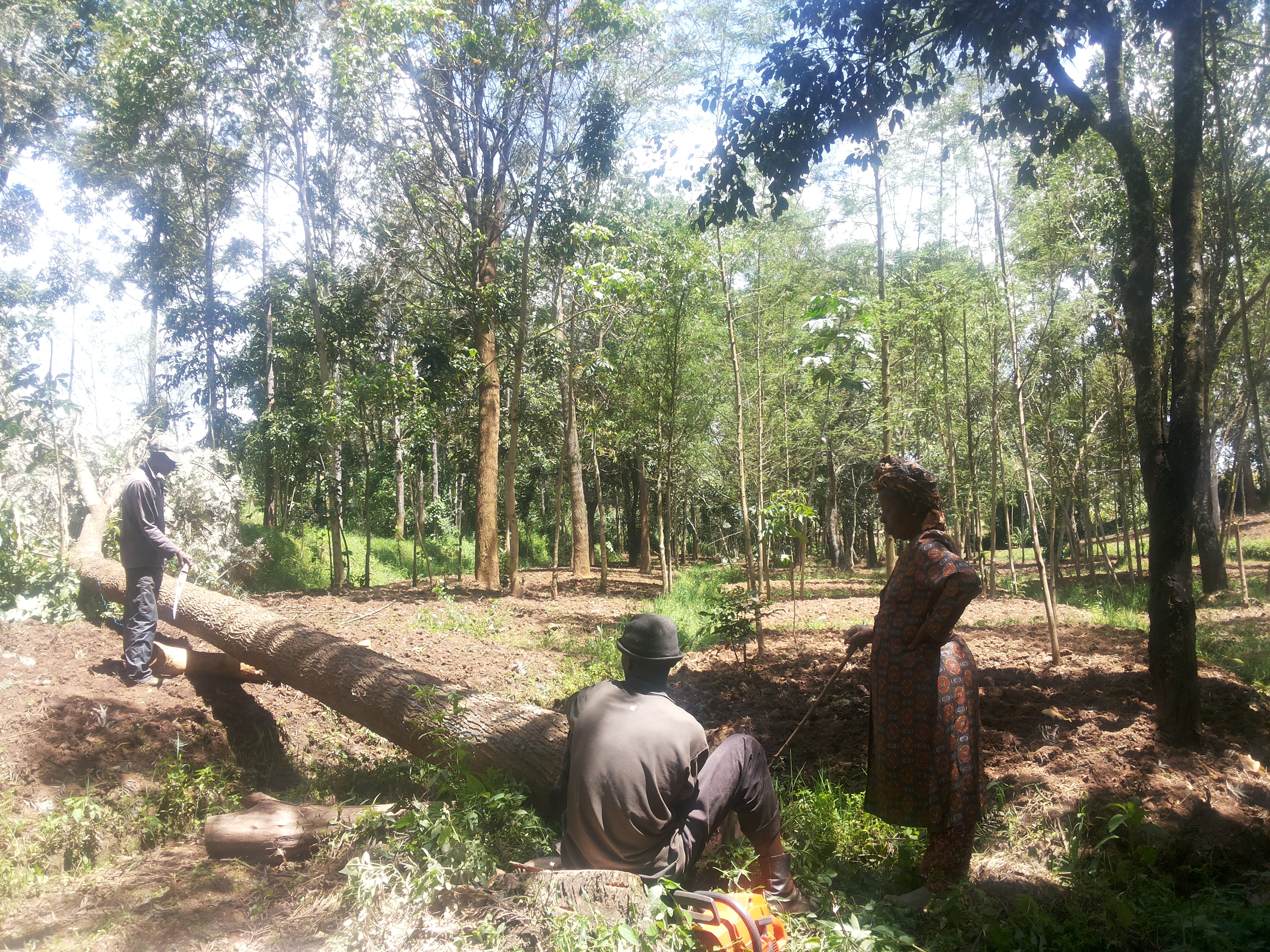
A planted woodlot of exotics which relieves collection pressure on the forest

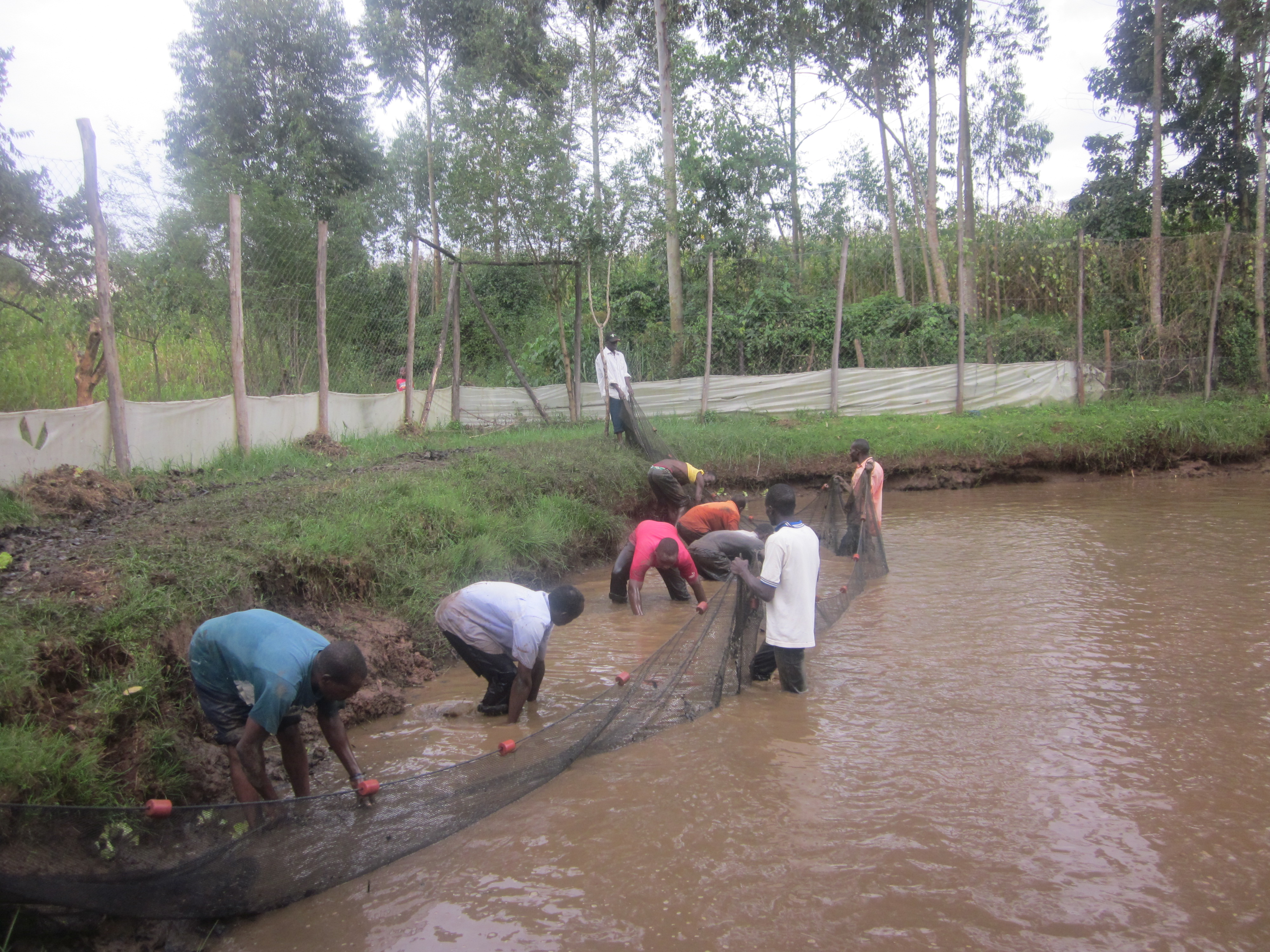
A tilapia fish farming project
