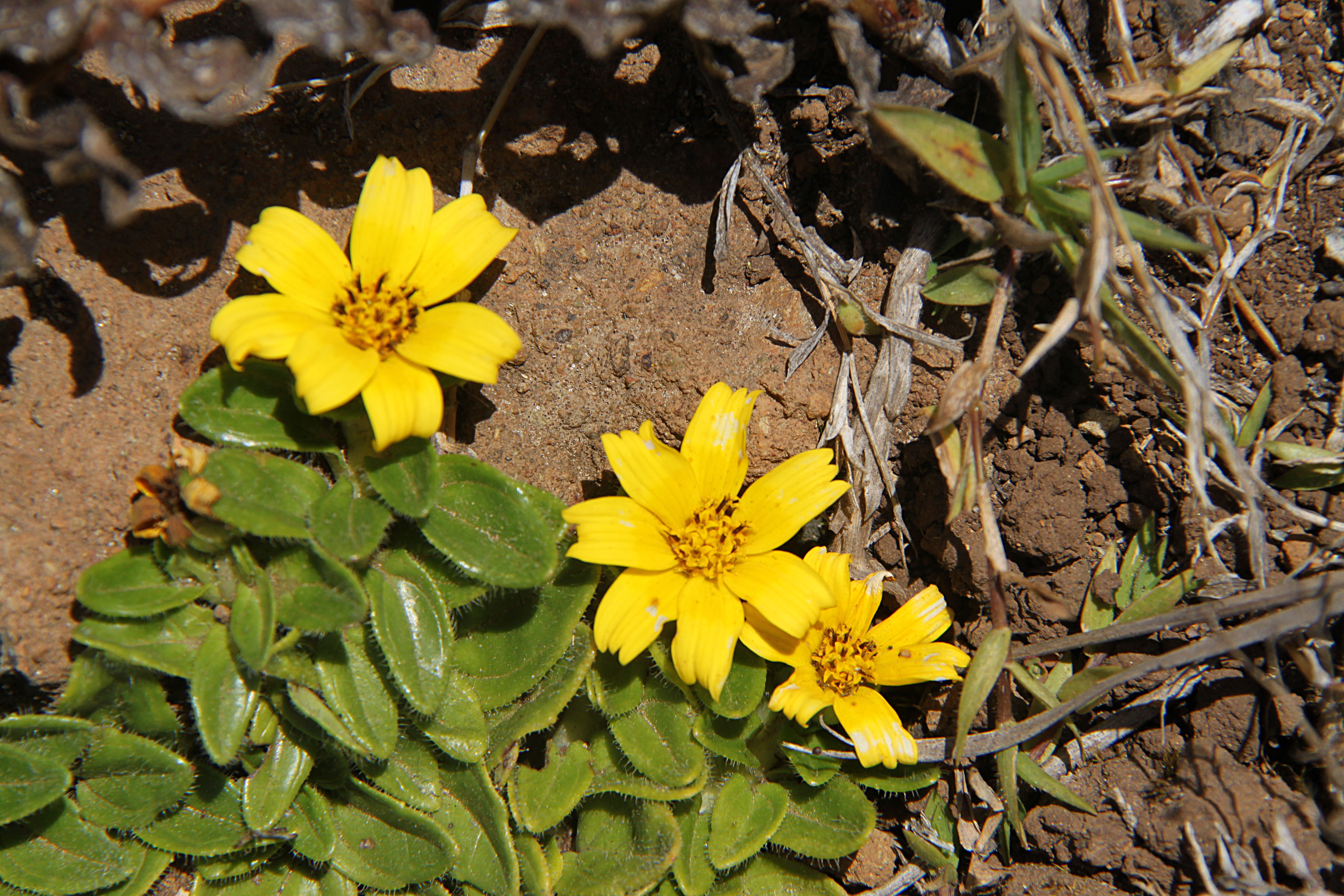

Scientific classification
- Kingdom: Plantae
- Clade: Tracheophytes
- Clade: Angiosperms
- Clade: Eudicots
- Clade: Asterids
- Order: Asterales
- Family: Asteraceae
- Genus: Guizotia
- Species: G. jacksonii

Binomial name
- Guizotia jacksonii (S.Moore) J.Baagøe

Synonyms
- Coreopsis jacksonii, Bidens jacksonii; Coreopsis jacksonii var. arthrochaeta; Guizotia reptans; Guizotia reptans var. keniensis; Bidens spathulata

= Guizotia jacksonii =

Species of flowering plant

Guizotia jacksonii is a low, creeping, perennial plant with ovate leaves and yellow flowerheads belonging to the family Asteraceae. This species is endemic to Kenya, and grows along roads and other open places in the forest zones the central highlands of Kenya.

== Taxonomy ==
In 1902, Spencer Le Marchant Moore was the first to describe this species of sunfleck as Coreopsis jacksonii, based on a specimen collected by Frederick John Jackson from the Kiambu County in Kenya in 1899. John Hutchinson assigned a plant collected by Battiscombe from the Aberdare Range in Nyandarua County to the genus Guizotia and called it G. reptans. Earl Edward Sherff described in 1923 a plant from the western slopes of Mount Kenya, found by Mearns, as Bidens spathulata. By 1926 he had realised it was identical to Moore's species, but as he thought it better placed in Bidens, he made the new combination B. jacksonii. Robert Elias Fries collected a slightly different specimen in 1928 that he called Guizotia reptans var. keniensis, while Sherff also had a plant he regarded as sufficiently divergent and called it Coreopsis jacksonii var. arthrochaeta in 1929. It wasn't until 1974 that J. Baagøe synonymised all of these names, and had to create the new combination Guizotia jacksonii to satisfy the International Code of Nomenclature for algae, fungi, and plants.

== Description ==
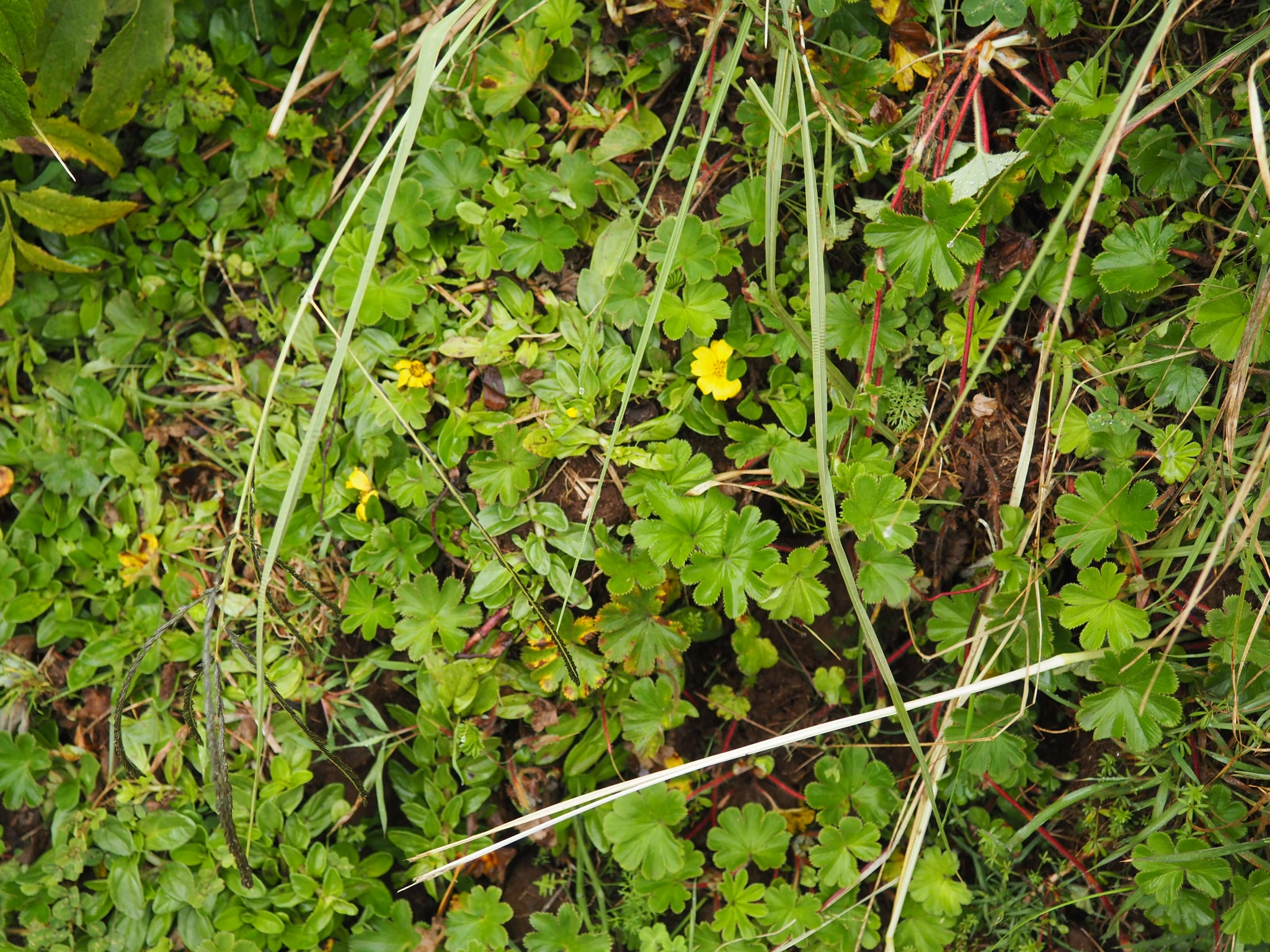
Flowering on a slopy bank, Aberdare National Park

Guizotia jacksonii is a low (about 1 cm high) perennial, herbaceous, creeping plant, which branches sparingly, each hairless stem 3–30 cm long, that makes roots at the nodes and sometimes forms clumps. The leaves are set opposite along the stem and may be unequal to each other, lacking a leaf stalk, oval in shape 1–6¼ cm long and ½–2½ cm wide, merged at the narrowed foot with the opposing leaf. The edge of the leaf has distanced and very small teeth ending in a gland, and are often rolled back. There may be some hairs on the leaf or only on the veins. The flowerheads sit individually in the axil of the leaves near the tip and stand on a stalk of ½–3 cm long. The involucre is ¾–1¼ cm long, the individual bract with a row of hairs along the rim. The scales (or paleas) set on the common base of the florets (called receptacle) at the foot of each floret are yellowish and up to 3 mm long. Each flowerhead has four to nine yellow ray florets on the outside with a tube of 2 mm long, and a strap of ¾–1½ cm long, tipped with three teeth. In the middle are seven to thirteen disc florets, each 3¾–5 mm long. The ripe indehiscent and one-seeded fruits (called cypselas) are brown in color and 3½ mm long. There is no hairy or scaly pappus present. The species has thirty chromosomes (2n=30).

== Distribution ==
Guizotia jacksonii is an endemic of Mount Elgon, Cherangani Hills Forest, the Aberdare Range, Mau Forest and Mount Kenya, where it occurs between 2350–3900 m altitude.
