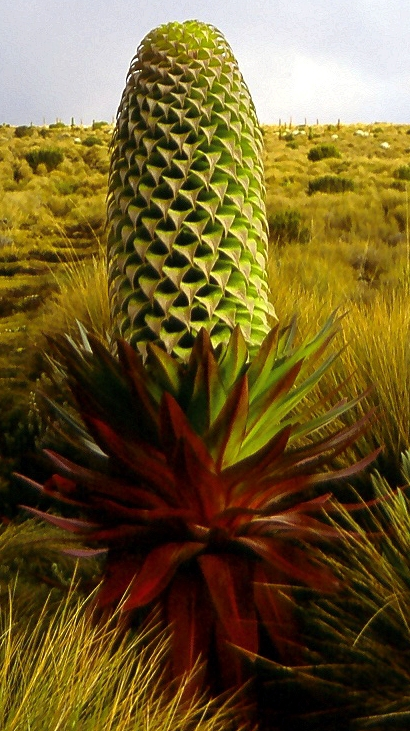

Scientific classification
- Kingdom: Plantae
- Clade: Embryophytes
- Clade: Tracheophytes
- Clade: Spermatophytes
- Clade: Angiosperms
- Clade: Eudicots
- Clade: Asterids
- Order: Asterales
- Family: Campanulaceae
- Genus: Lobelia
- Species: L. deckenii

Binomial name
- Lobelia deckenii (Asch.) Hemsl.

Synonyms
- Dortmanna deckenii (Asch.) Kuntze; Tupa deckenii Asch. Tupa kerstenii Vatke

= Lobelia deckenii =

Species of flowering plant

Lobelia deckenii is a species of flowering plant in the family Campanulaceae. It is a giant lobelia endemic to the mountains of Tanzania. It is listed as a threatened plant of the forests of Cherangani hills, Kenya. It grows in moist areas, such as valley bottoms and moorland, in contrast to Lobelia telekii which grows in a similar but drier habitat. These two species produce occasional hybrids. Lobelia deckenii plants usually produce multiple rosettes. Each rosette grows for several decades, produces a single large inflorescence and hundreds of thousands of seeds, then dies. This is called monocarpy. Because individual plants have multiple rosettes, they survive to reproduce repeatedly, and plants with more rosettes flower more frequently. Each rosette of yucca-like leaves with its inflorescence can reach a maximum height of 3.7 m (12 ft). The flowers are pollinated by sunbirds (Nectariniidae). It is iteroparous.

Lobelia deckenii plants usually form between one and eighteen rosettes which are connected underground. The individual rosettes grow slowly in the alpine environment, and may take decades to reach reproductive size. The rosette that produces an inflorescence dies after flowering, but the remaining connected rosettes live on.

Lobelia deckenii is the only alpine species of lobelia that is native to Kilimanjaro, occurring between 3,800 and 4,300 m (12,500 and 14,100 ft).

Lobelia gregoriana which was formerly treated as Lobelia deckenii subsp. keniensis occurs on Mount Kenya, between 3,300 and 4,600 m (10,800 and 15,100 ft). It is eaten less by rock hyrax than Lobelia telekii, which occurs more often in hyrax habitat. The lobelia species on Mount Kenya are both pollinated by birds, especially the scarlet-tufted sunbird and the alpine chat.

This species of giant lobelia is known for the reservoirs of water held in its rosettes, which freeze at night and protect the apical meristem which is contained in a dense central leaf bud. When this reservoir is drained, the temperature of the inner meristem drops below freezing, which does not occur when the fluid is left intact. The crescent-shaped ice cubes formed in these rosettes gave rise to the nickname, "gin and tonic lobelia".

== Gallery ==
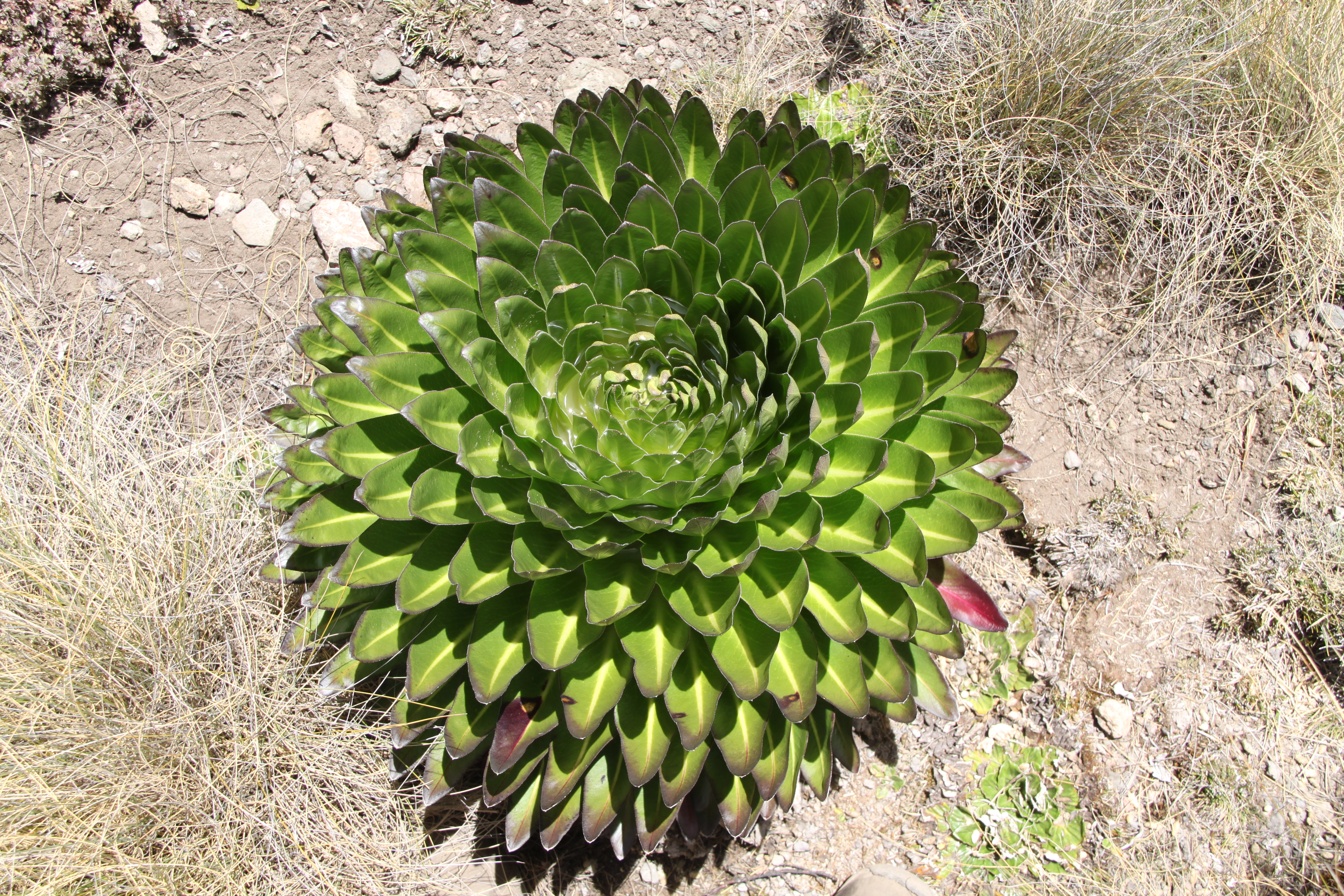
A water-holding giant lobelia seen from above

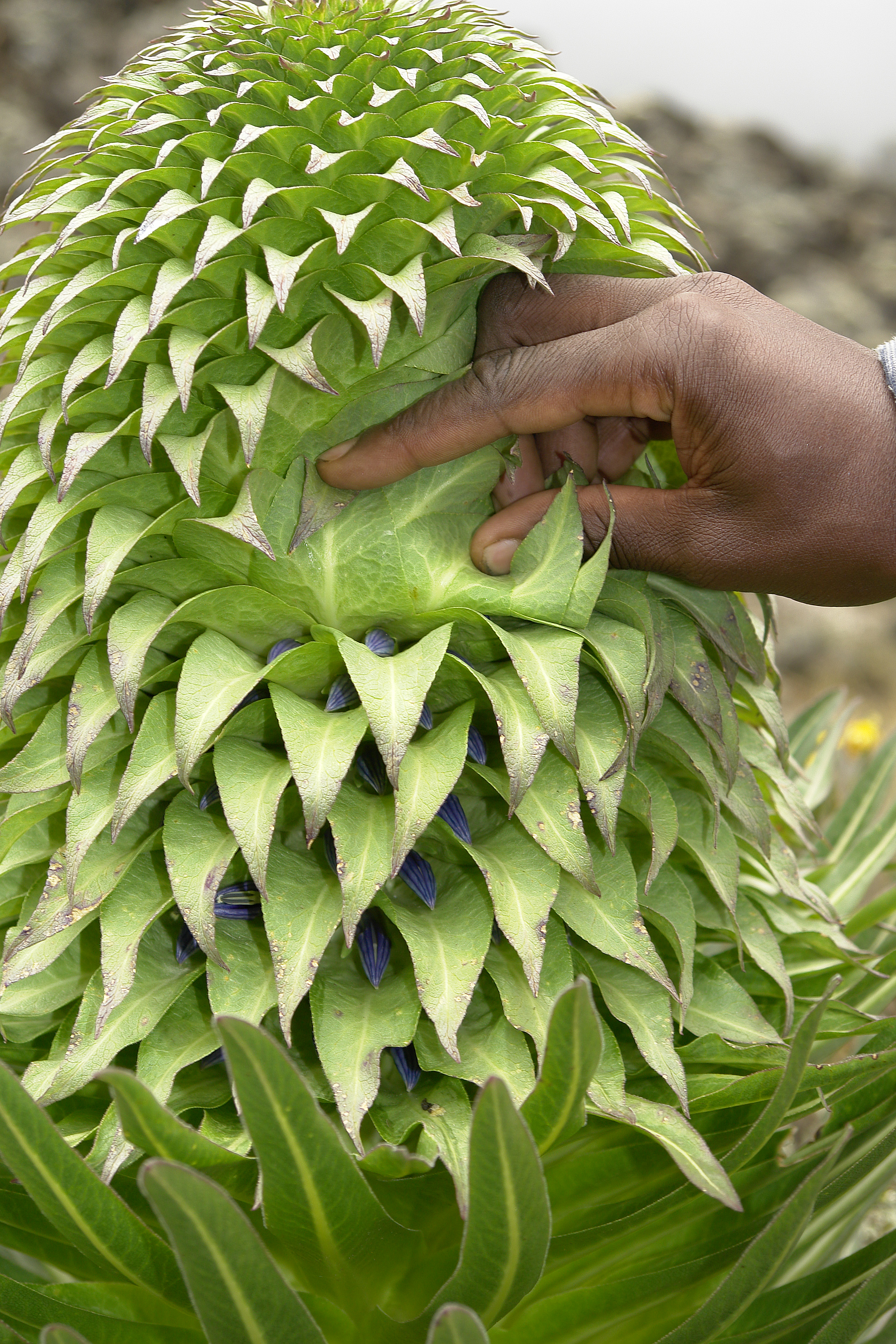
A young inflorescence, its floral bracts still intact

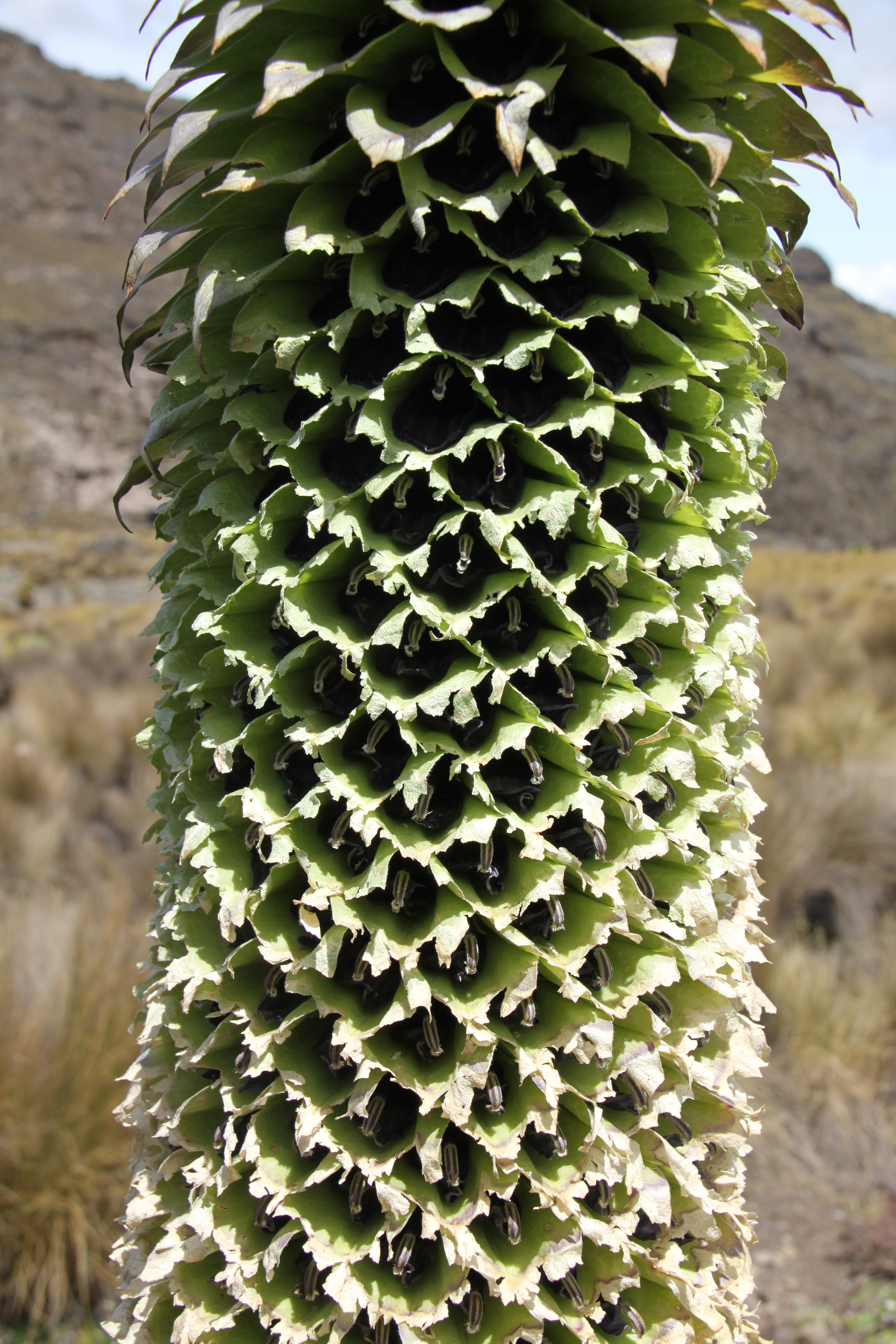
Inflorescence of the giant lobelia, its floral bracts shredded by the feet of perching bird pollinators
