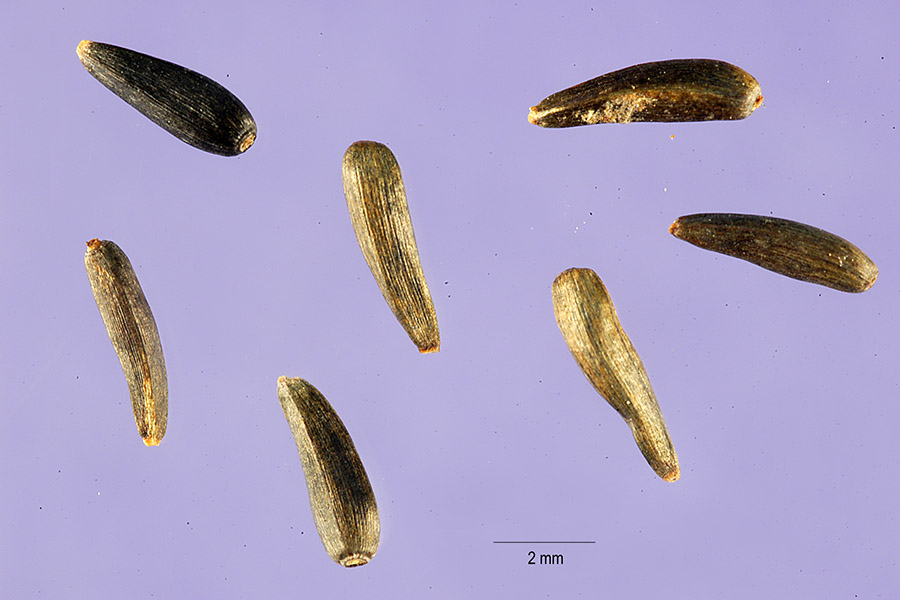
- Guizotia abyssinica achenes

Scientific classification
- Kingdom: Plantae
- Clade: Embryophytes
- Clade: Tracheophytes
- Clade: Spermatophytes
- Clade: Angiosperms
- Clade: Eudicots
- Clade: Asterids
- Order: Asterales
- Family: Asteraceae
- Subfamily: Asteroideae
- Tribe: Millerieae
- Subtribe: Milleriinae
- Genus: Guizotia; Cass. 1829

Synonyms
- Veslingia Vis.; Ramtilla DC.; Werrinuwa B.Heyne

= Guizotia =

Genus of flowering plants

Guizotia is a genus of African herbs in the family Asteraceae. They are often known as sunflecks. The species Guizotia abyssinica is occasionally found outside of cultivation in Europe, North America and Asia.

Species

- Guizotia abyssinica (L.f.) Cass.
- Guizotia arborescens Friis
- Guizotia candussioi Cif.
- Guizotia jacksonii (S.Moore) J.Baagøe
- Guizotia scabra (Vis.) Chiov.
- Guizotia schimperi Sch.Bip. ex Walp.
- Guizotia villosa Sch.Bip. ex A.Rich.
- Guizotia villosula Cif.
- Guizotia zavattarii Lanza
