= Giant lobelia =

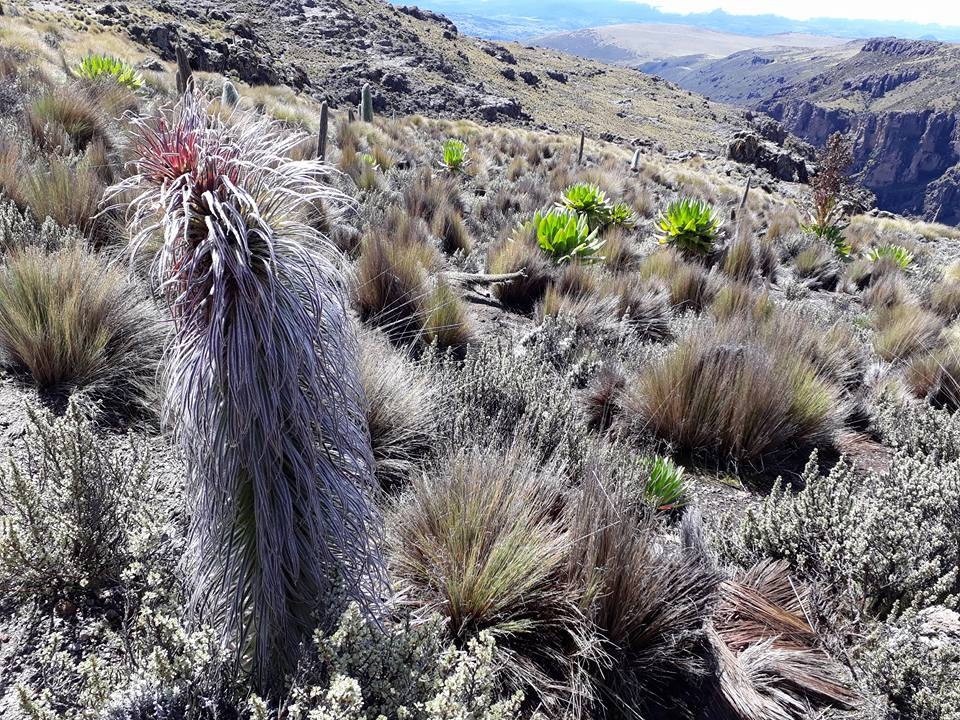
Giant lobelia and Senecio plants in Mt Kenya.

Giant lobelia is a common name for several plants in the genus Lobelia; many of these species are restricted to high altitude, alpine ecosystems. In East African highlands as many as 20 species were listed in 1934 (Bruce). A selection of species names is below. Locations where given are from 1934 (Bruce) which also provides a key to these species.

- Lobelia aberdarica East Africa: Aberdare Mountains and Mt. Kenya, Kenya; Mt Elgon, Uganda/Kenya
- Lobelia bambuseti East Africa: Aberdare Mountains and Mt. Kenya, Kenya
- Lobelia bequaertii East Africa: Rwenzori Mountains
- Lobelia deckenii East Africa: Kilimanjaro, Tanzania
- Lobelia fenniae East Africa
- Lobelia giberroa East Africa: Rwenzori Mountains, Eastern Sudan and Aberdare Mountains, Kenya
- Lobelia gregoriana (syn. L. deckenii subsp. keniensis, L. keniensis)
- Lobelia lanuriensis East Africa
- Lobelia morogoroensis
- Lobelia rhynchopetalum Abysinnia/Ethiopia
- Lobelia stuhlmannii East Africa: Rwenzori Mountains
- Lobelia telekii East Africa: Mt Elgon, Uganda/Kenya
- Lobelia wollastonii East Africa: Rwenzori and Virunga

The giant lobelia span Africa, Hawaii, South America, the Himalayas, and Southeast Asia. Phylogenetic analysis strongly supports that this is a monophyletic group. The group is thought to have originated in the Chinese region. While many of the East African species have a basal rosette, representatives in Hawai'i, for example, exhibit a diversity of forms.

== Other sources ==
- E. A. Bruce. “The Giant Lobelias of East Africa.” Bulletin of Miscellaneous Information (Royal Botanic Gardens, Kew), vol. 1934, no. 2, 1934, pp. 61–88. JSTOR, https://doi.org/10.2307/4118226. Accessed 14 June 2024.
