= Hypericum kiboense =

Scientific classification
- Kingdom: Plantae
- Clade: Tracheophytes
- Clade: Angiosperms
- Clade: Eudicots
- Clade: Rosids
- Order: Malpighiales
- Family: Hypericaceae
- Genus: Hypericum
- Section: Hypericum sect. Adenosepalum
- Species: H. kiboense

Binomial name
- Hypericum kiboense Oliv.

Synonyms
- Hypericum conjunctum sensu Agnew; Hypericum kiloense sensu H.H.; Hypericum sp. A sensu Milne-Redh.

Species of flowering plant in the St John's wort family

Hypericum kiboense is a flowering plant the family Hypericaceae, section Adenosepalum, subsection Adenosepalum.

== Description ==
The species is a shrub that grows to be 2.5 m (8 ft 2 in) tall with orange or red stems. Its flowers are golden and tinged red and are 15–20 mm in diameter.

== Distribution ==
Hypericum kiboense is found in Uganda, Kenya (including the forests of Cherangani hills), and North Tanzania.
