= Rwenzori–Virunga montane moorlands =

Montane ecoregion in central Africa

Rwenzori-Virunga montane moorlands
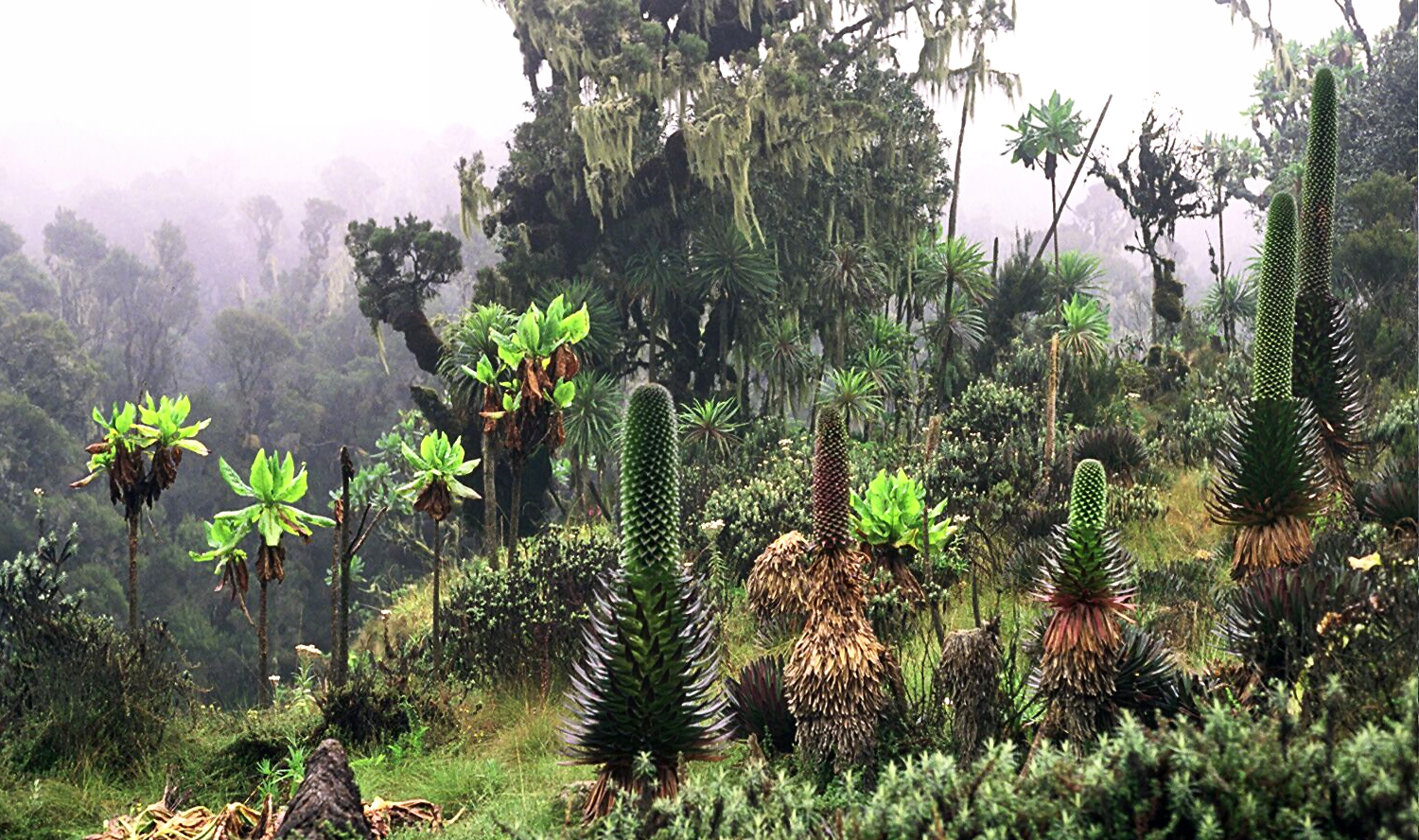
- Lower Bigo Bog at 3400m in the Rwenzori Mountains with giant lobelia in foreground.

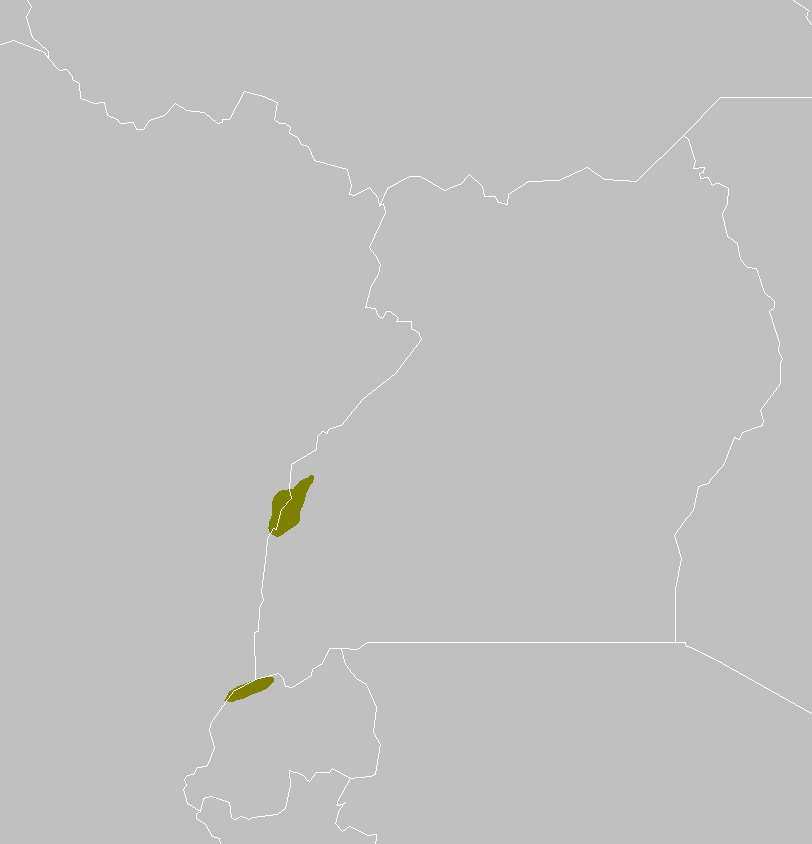
- Boundaries of Rwenzori-Virunga Montane Moorlands

Ecology
- Realm: Afrotropical
- Biome: montane grasslands and shrublands
- Borders: Albertine Rift montane forests

Geography
- Area: 516 km^{2} (199 mi^{2})
- Countries: Democratic Republic of the Congo; Rwanda, Uganda

Conservation
- Conservation status: Relatively stable/intact
- Protected: 513 km² (99%)

The Ruwenzori-Virunga montane moorlands is a montane grasslands and shrublands ecoregion of the Rwenzori Mountains and Virunga Mountains in central Africa.

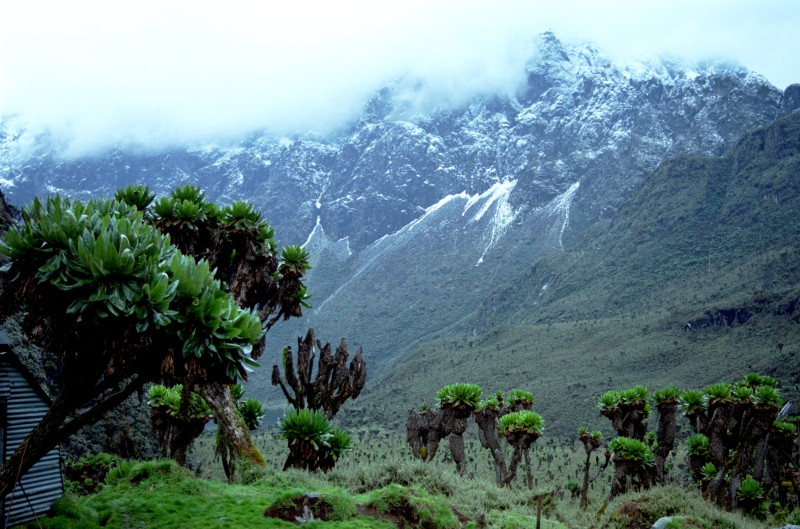
View of the Rwenzori peaks, with giant groundsel plants (Dendrosenecio) in the foreground

== Setting ==
The ecoregion lies above 3000 meters elevation, and is divided into two areas: the Rwenzori Mountains on the border of Uganda and the Democratic Republic of the Congo, and the volcanic Virunga Mountains to the south, where the Democratic Republic of the Congo, Rwanda, and Uganda meet. It is surrounded at lower elevations by the Albertine Rift montane forests ecoregion.

The Afroalpine flora of the higher altitudes have much in common with the East African montane moorlands of Mount Kilimanjaro, Mount Kenya and Mount Meru.

== Flora and fauna ==
The ecoregion is home to a distinctive Afroalpine vegetation. Habitat types include lakes, marshy deltas and peat bogs, open montane grasslands, shrublands, enclaves of high elevation forest, snow fields, and glaciers. Giant rosette plants, including various species of lobelias and senecios, are characteristic of the ecoregion. Vegetation varies with elevation, soils, and exposure.

The upper montane forest of the Albertine Rift montane forests, composed of cloud forests with Hagenia abyssinica and Hypericum revolutum, or bamboo forests of Sinarundinaria alpina, extends up to 3,000–3,300 m (9,800–10,800 ft).

Ericaceous forests form a transition zone between the montane forests and alpine moorlands, extending up to 3,800 m (12,500 ft). Erica arborea is the dominant species. The ericaceous vegetation varies in growth habit, in places forming a dense forest of single-trunked trees, thickets of multi-trunked shrubs, or open shrubland reaching only 1 meter high. The ericaceous forest supports many epiphytes.

Alpine grasslands and alpine shrublands extend up to 4,500 m (14,800 ft) altitude. Tussock grasslands include Festuca abyssinica and Carex runssoroensis. The giant rosette plants Lobelia wollastonii and Dendrosenecio johnstonii are found on both the Rwenzoris and the Virungas, while Lobelia stuhlmannii grows only on the Virungas.

In the portion of the Rwenzoris above 4,500 m (14,800 ft) altitude, the alpine grasslands and shrublands yield to upper alpine dwarf scrub, also known as subnival shrub, where Helichrysum stuhlmanii forms isolated thickets.

The Virunga Mountains provide habitat for the endangered mountain gorilla (Gorilla beringei beringei), although these spend most of their time in lower zones.

== Protected areas ==
A 2017 assessment found that 513 km^{2} (198 sq mi), or 99%, of the ecoregion is in protected areas. Virunga National Park protects the Congolese portion of moorlands in both the Rwenzori and Virunga ranges. Uganda's Rwenzori Mountains National Park protects the Ugandan portion of the Rwenzori moorlands, and Rwanda's Volcans National Park protects the Rwandan portion of the Virunga moorlands.
