= Impatiens meruensis =

Conservation status
- Least Concern (IUCN 3.1)

Scientific classification
- Kingdom: Plantae
- Clade: Tracheophytes
- Clade: Angiosperms
- Clade: Eudicots
- Clade: Asterids
- Order: Ericales
- Family: Balsaminaceae
- Genus: Impatiens
- Species: I. meruensis

Binomial name
- Impatiens meruensis Gilg

Species of flowering plant

Impatiens meruensis is a species of flowering plant in the family Balsaminaceae. It is found in Kenya, Sudan, Tanzania, and Uganda. Its natural habitats include mountain forests, streambanks, and swamps. It may grow in the spray zones of waterfalls. It is generally a widespread species in its range, at least in the uplands of Kenya. Including the forests of Cherangani hills.
