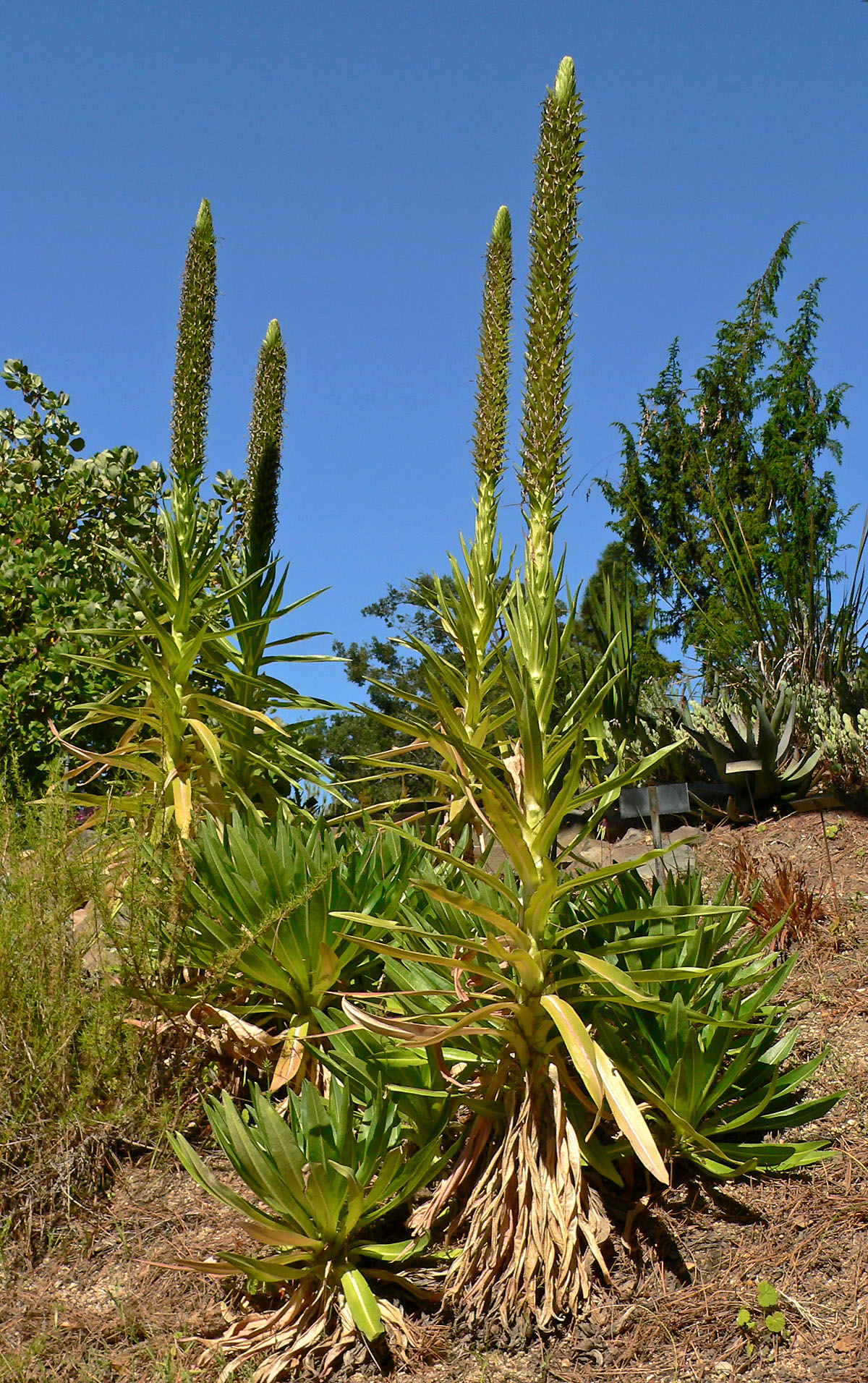

Conservation status
- Least Concern (IUCN 3.1)

Scientific classification
- Kingdom: Plantae
- Clade: Tracheophytes
- Clade: Angiosperms
- Clade: Eudicots
- Clade: Asterids
- Order: Asterales
- Family: Campanulaceae
- Genus: Lobelia
- Species: L. aberdarica

Binomial name
- Lobelia aberdarica R.E.Fr. & T.C.E.Fr.

= Lobelia aberdarica =

Species of flowering plant

Lobelia aberdarica is a species of plant in the family Campanulaceae. It is restricted to the uplands of Kenya and Uganda (1860-3350m). It has been found in the forests of Cherangani hills, Kenya. Its natural habitats are lower and upper montane and subalpine swamps and meadows. It has been brought into cultivation.
