= Festuca pilgeri =

Scientific classification
- Kingdom: Plantae
- Clade: Tracheophytes
- Clade: Angiosperms
- Clade: Monocots
- Clade: Commelinids
- Order: Poales
- Family: Poaceae
- Subfamily: Pooideae
- Genus: Festuca
- Species: F. pilgeri

Binomial name
- Festuca pilgeri St.-Yves

Species of grass

Festuca pilgeri is a species of grass which is endemic to East Africa.

== Description ==
The plant is perennial and caespitose with 40–60 centimetres (16–24 in) long culms that are clumped. The ligule is going around the eciliate membrane while the leaf-sheaths are smooth and have a hairy surface. Leaf-blades are filiform and are 10–30 centimetres (3.9–11.8 in) by 0.75 millimetres (0.030 in) with hairy surface. The panicle is linear, contracted, inflorescenced and is 8–20 centimetres (3.1–7.9 in) long.

Spikelets are oblong and solitary with pedicelled fertile spikelets that carry 3–5 fertile florets. The glumes are chartaceous and keelless, have acute apexes, with only difference is in size. The upper one is lanceolate and is 4–6.5 millimetres (0.16–0.26 in) long while the other one is linear and is 3–6 millimetres (0.12–0.24 in). Fertile lemma is 5.5–7.5 millimetres (0.22–0.30 in) long and are elliptic, coriaceous and keelless. The lemma itself have an asperulous surface and acute apex while the main lemma have an awn that is 1–3 millimetres (0.039–0.118 in) long. The palea have two veins and scaberulous keels. Flowers have three stamens and hairy ovary while the fruits are caryopses with an additional pericarp and linear hilum. Both flowers and fruits have hairy apexes as well.
