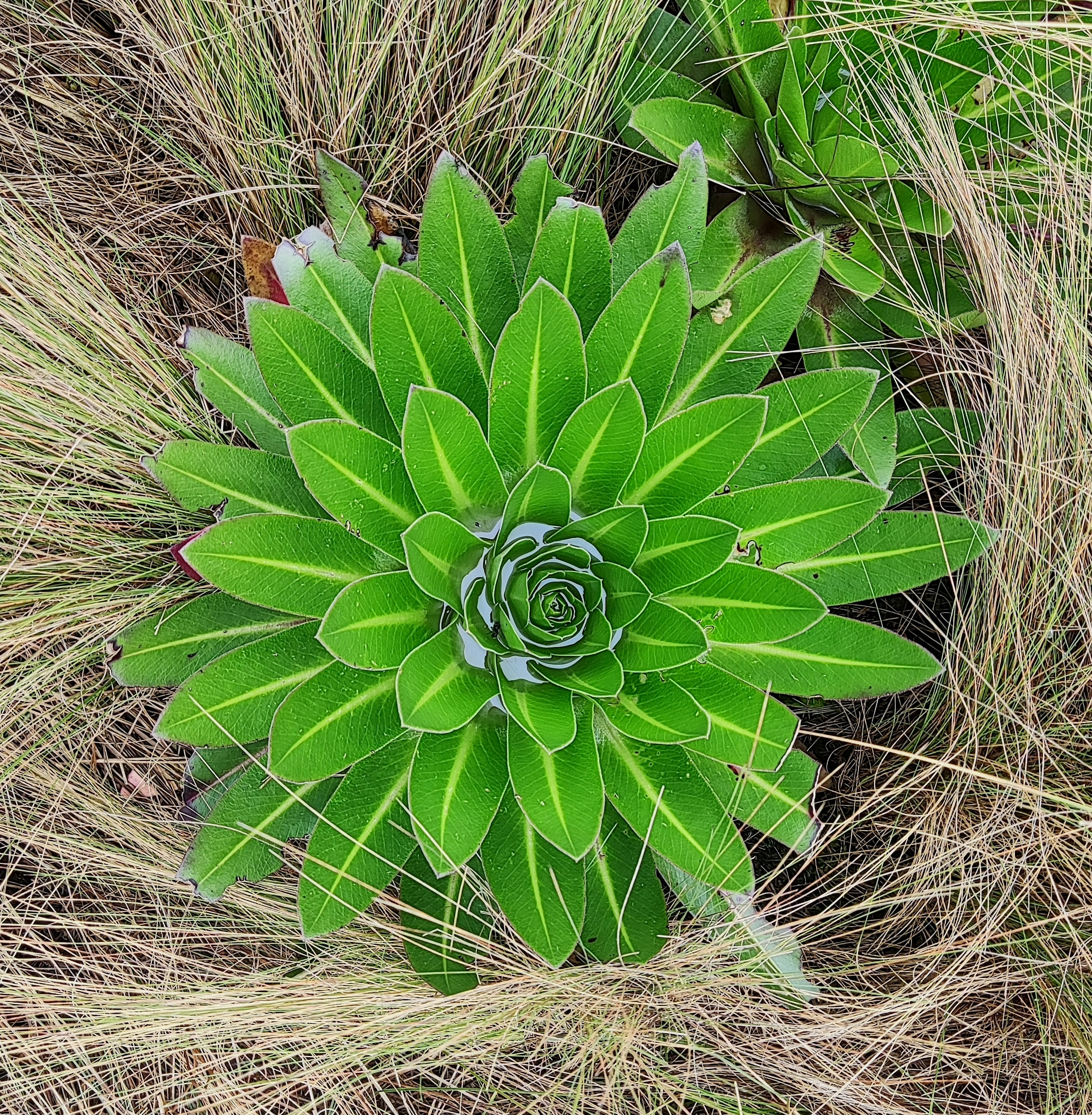
- Rosette of leaves holding liquid, Mount Kenya

Scientific classification
- Kingdom: Plantae
- Clade: Tracheophytes
- Clade: Angiosperms
- Clade: Eudicots
- Clade: Asterids
- Order: Asterales
- Family: Campanulaceae
- Genus: Lobelia
- Species: L. gregoriana

Binomial name
- Lobelia gregoriana Baker f.

Subspecies
- Lobelia gregoriana subsp. gregoriana; Lobelia gregoriana subsp. elgonensis (R.E.Fr. & T.C.E.Fr.) E.B.Knox; Lobelia gregoriana subsp. sattimae (R.E.Fr. & T.C.E.Fr.) E.B.Knox

= Lobelia gregoriana =

Species of plant

Lobelia gregoriana is a species of giant lobelia found in the Afro-montane region of East Africa. The type is from Mount Kenya. Subspecies sattimae is known from Sattima peak in Aberdare and elgonensis from Mount Elgon and Cherangani. It grows at an altitude of 3200–4500 m. Like some other giant lobelias it produces ice-nucleating polysachharides in the central rosette that holds water and is thought to protect the plant from cold injury.

The name honours John Walter Gregory whose original material included a mix of the leaves of this plant and the inflorescence of Dendrosenecio keniodendron.
