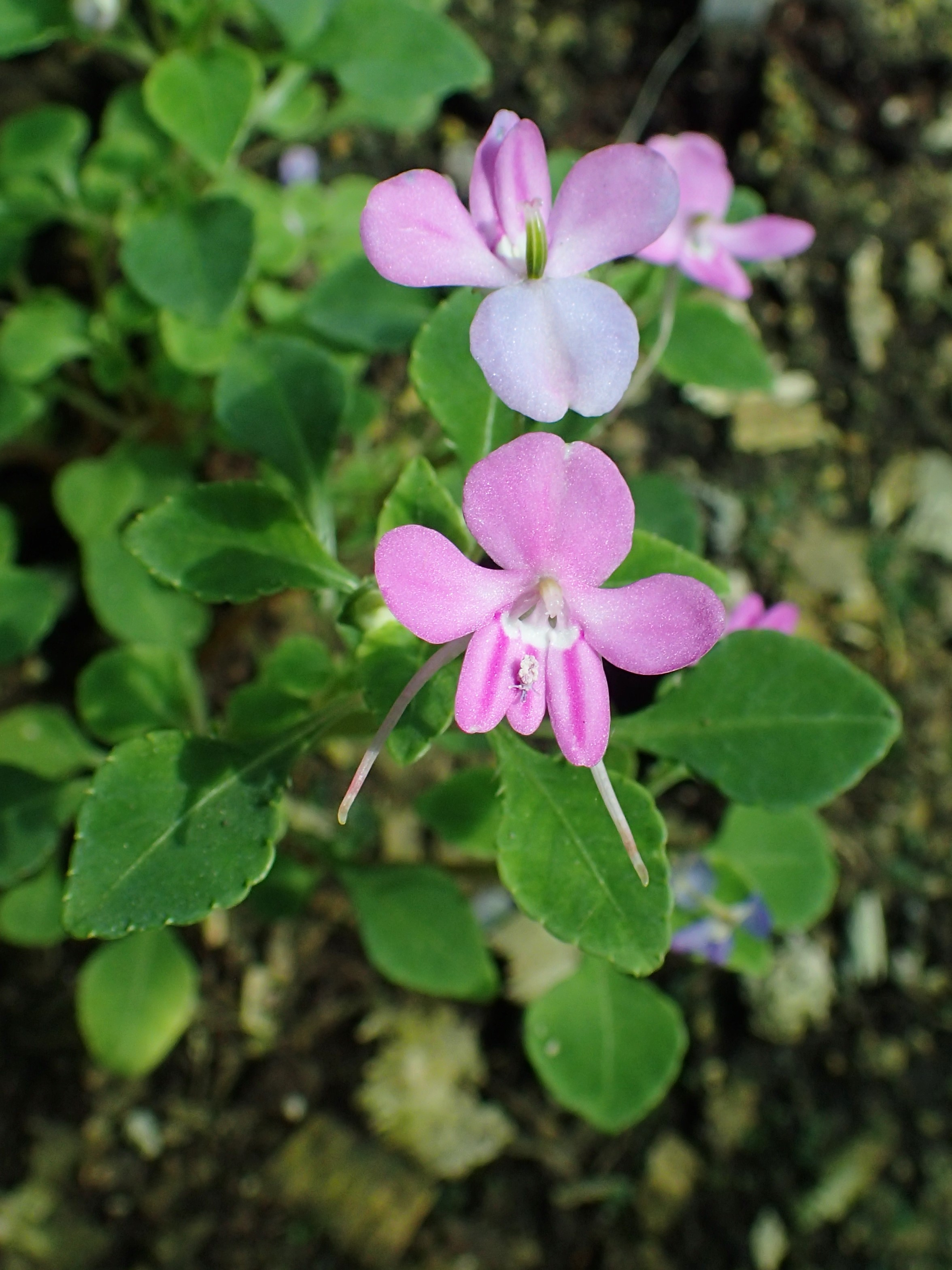

Scientific classification
- Kingdom: Plantae
- Clade: Embryophytes
- Clade: Tracheophytes
- Clade: Angiosperms
- Clade: Eudicots
- Clade: Asterids
- Order: Ericales
- Family: Balsaminaceae
- Genus: Impatiens
- Species: I. pseudoviola

Binomial name
- Impatiens pseudoviola Gilg

Synonyms
- List: Impatiens filicetorum T.C.E.Fr.; Impatiens hemrichii G.M.Schulze; Impatiens kwaiensis Gilg; Impatiens pseudoviola var. alba G.W.Hu & Q.F.Wang

= Impatiens pseudoviola =

Species of flowering plant

Impatiens pseudoviola, commonly known as the jewelweed and touch me not, is a species of flowering plant in the family Balsaminaceae, native to Kenya and Tanzania.

== Description ==
This plant grows between 6–12 cm (2.4–4.7 in). It flowers bright pink between summer and autumn.

This perennial species has ovate, alternate toothed leaves.

== Cultivation ==
It has gained the Royal Horticultural Society's Award of Garden Merit.

This species prefers to be grown in a semi-shade environment. It can be propagated with stem cuttings during the spring or summer months. However, it is not hardy and it is recommended that it is kept indoors during the winter months.

== Pests and diseases ==
This plant is susceptible to red spider mites, aphids, downy mildew, and whiteflies.
