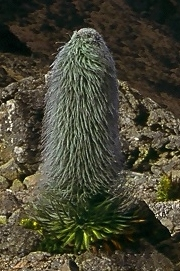

Scientific classification
- Kingdom: Plantae
- Clade: Embryophytes
- Clade: Tracheophytes
- Clade: Spermatophytes
- Clade: Angiosperms
- Clade: Eudicots
- Clade: Asterids
- Order: Asterales
- Family: Campanulaceae
- Genus: Lobelia
- Species: L. telekii

Binomial name
- Lobelia telekii Scwheinf.

= Lobelia telekii =

Species of flowering plant

Lobelia telekii is a species of flowering plant in the family Campanulaceae, that is found only in the alpine zones of Mount Kenya, Mount Elgon, and the Aberdare Mountains of East Africa. It occurs at higher altitudes on well-drained sloped hillsides. It is a semelparous species, growing vegetatively for about 40 years and puts all its reproductive effort into producing single large inflorescence up to 3 metres (10 ft) tall before dying. Inflorescences of L. telekii also possesses a large pith-volume for internal water storage and marcescent foliage which could provide insulation. It secretes a polysaccharide into this reservoir, which may be useful for its survival in the cold climate. The plant is named after the Austro-Hungarian explorer, Count Sámuel Teleki.

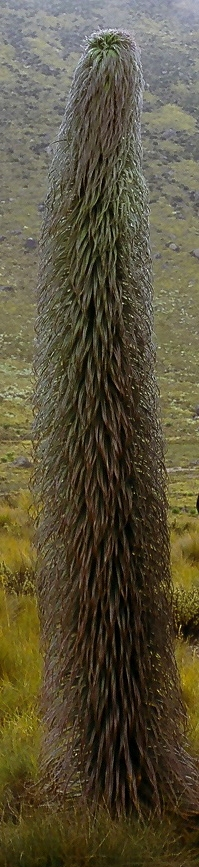
The inflorescence of Lobelia telekii can grow up to 3 metres (10 ft) tall

L. telekii plants usually consist of a single rosette, which grows for several decades, flowers once, and then dies (a strategy termed as semelparity). However, a very small number of plants have multiple rosettes connected by an underground stem. Each flower is subtended by a long hairy bract, and the overall appearance has led to the nickname "Cousin Itt lobelia".

The bird-pollinated flowers of L. telekii are hidden among the large bracts within the inflorescence. The leaves and bracts are blue-green, and the flowers purple. Each flower can produce up to several hundred small (<1mm diameter) dark seeds, which are passively dispersed.

On Mount Kenya, Lobelia telekii occurs at elevations of 3,500–5,000 metres (11,500–16,400 ft). It inhabits the drier hill slopes, while its close relative Lobelia keniensis prefers the moister valley bottoms. Partially fertile hybrids do occur. The hill slopes often have rocky moraines that are home to Mount Kenya rock hyrax, which sometimes eat lobelia leaves and inflorescences, but herbivores are generally deterred by the lobelia's bitter toxic sap, which contains alkaloids, probably including lobeline.

== Ecology ==
Lobelia telekii is pollinated mainly by birds, especially the scarlet-tufted malachite sunbird (Nectarinia johnstoni) which visits the inflorescence for nectar. It often visits the male flowers at the apex which are produced first (protandrous) and have more sugar than the female flowers that appear later at the base of the inflorescence. The birds defend their favourite stands of plants from other individuals of their species. The plants are eaten by rock hyrax (Procavia capensis johnstoni) in the dry season. The plant is protected by a latex and few other animals eat the plant. The rosettes of leaves hold water in the centre into which polysaccharides are exuded by the plant which are thought to cause ice-nucleation, preventing the plant tissue itself from freezing. They also hold fluid inside the inflorescences. This material has inspired the design of protection mechanisms for solar panels and other structures from ice.

== Taxonomy ==
Lobelia telekii was previously classified under the Rhynchopetalum section within the Tupa subgenus. The genus has since been reconfigured so that Tupa and Rhynchopetalum are separate sections, with L. telekii falling into the latter. Tupa and Rhynchopetalum are separated by their difference in chromosome count and geographic distribution, supported by morphological differences.
