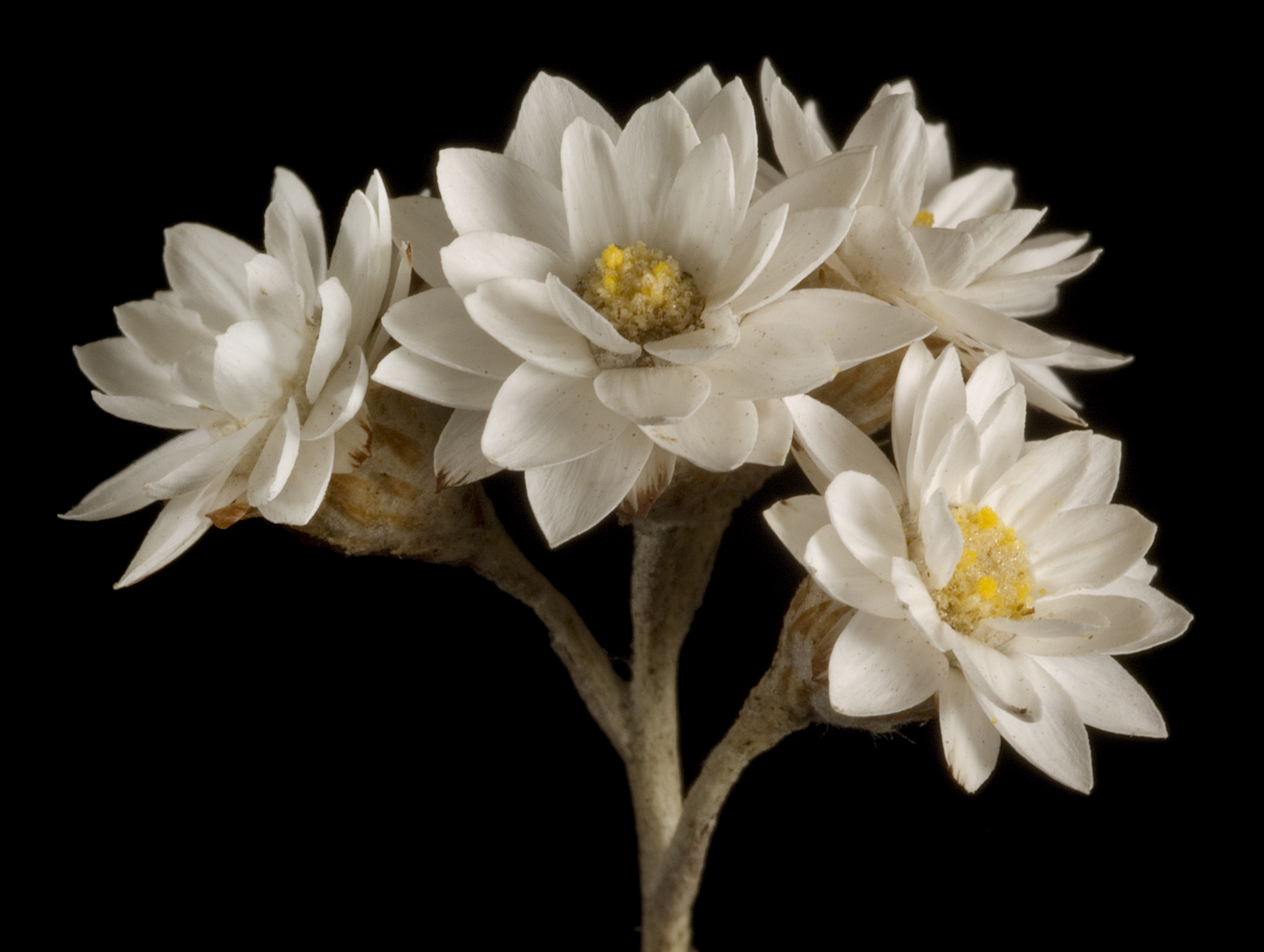

Scientific classification
- Kingdom: Plantae
- Clade: Tracheophytes
- Clade: Angiosperms
- Clade: Eudicots
- Clade: Asterids
- Order: Asterales
- Family: Asteraceae
- Genus: Pithocarpa
- Species: P. pulchella

Binomial name
- Pithocarpa pulchella Lindl.

= Pithocarpa pulchella =

Species of plant

Pithocarpa pulchella (common name - beautiful pithocarpa) is an erect, rigid, perennial herb in the Asteraceae family, which is endemic to the south-west of Western Australia.

It was first described in 1839 by John Lindley. There are no synonyms.
