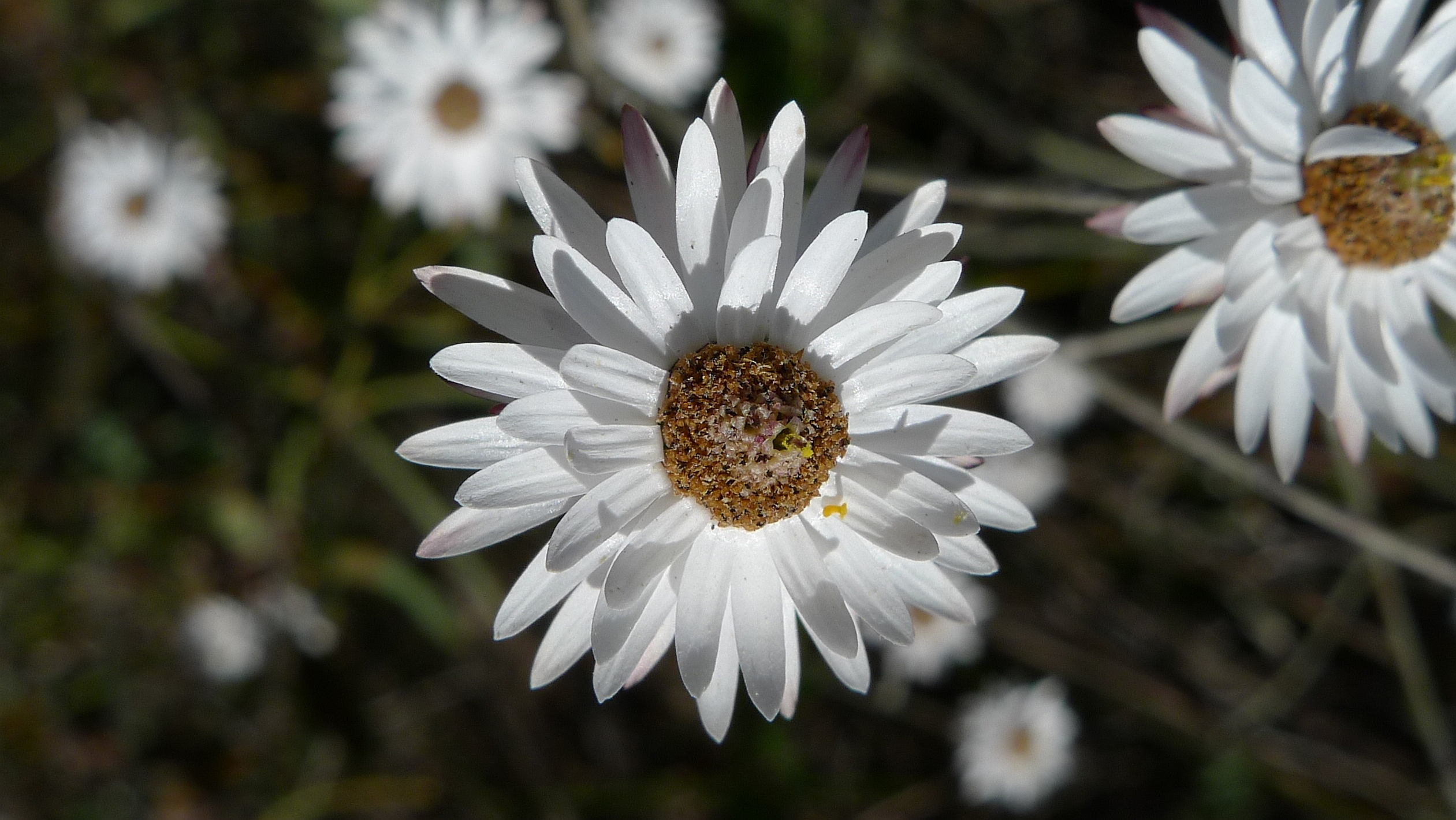
- Pithocarpa pulchella

Scientific classification
- Kingdom: Plantae
- Clade: Tracheophytes
- Clade: Angiosperms
- Clade: Eudicots
- Clade: Asterids
- Order: Asterales
- Family: Asteraceae
- Subfamily: Asteroideae
- Tribe: Gnaphalieae
- Genus: Pithocarpa; Lindl.

Type species
- Pithocarpa pulchella Lindl.

= Pithocarpa =

Genus of plants

Pithocarpa is a genus of Australian plants in the pussy's-toes tribe within the daisy family.

Species

- Pithocarpa corymbulosa Lindl. - Western Australia
- Pithocarpa pulchella Lindl. - Western Australia
