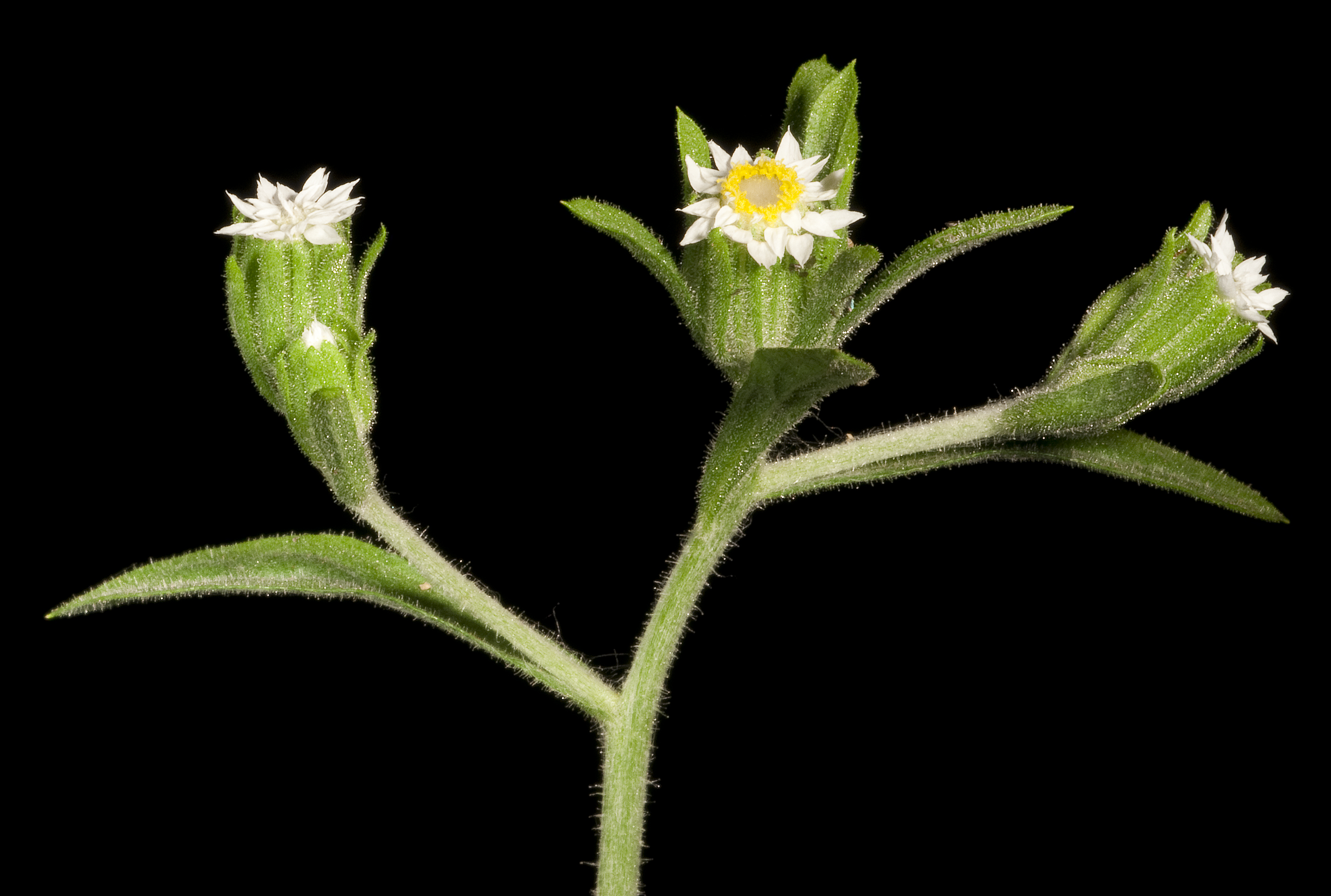

Scientific classification
- Kingdom: Plantae
- Clade: Tracheophytes
- Clade: Angiosperms
- Clade: Eudicots
- Clade: Asterids
- Order: Asterales
- Family: Asteraceae
- Genus: Ixiolaena
- Species: I. viscosa

Binomial name
- Ixiolaena viscosa Benth.

Synonyms
- Helichrysum asteroides DC.

= Ixiolaena viscosa =

Species of flowering plant

Ixiolaena viscosa is a species of flowering plant in the family Asteraceae, native to Western Australia. It was first described by George Bentham in 1837.
