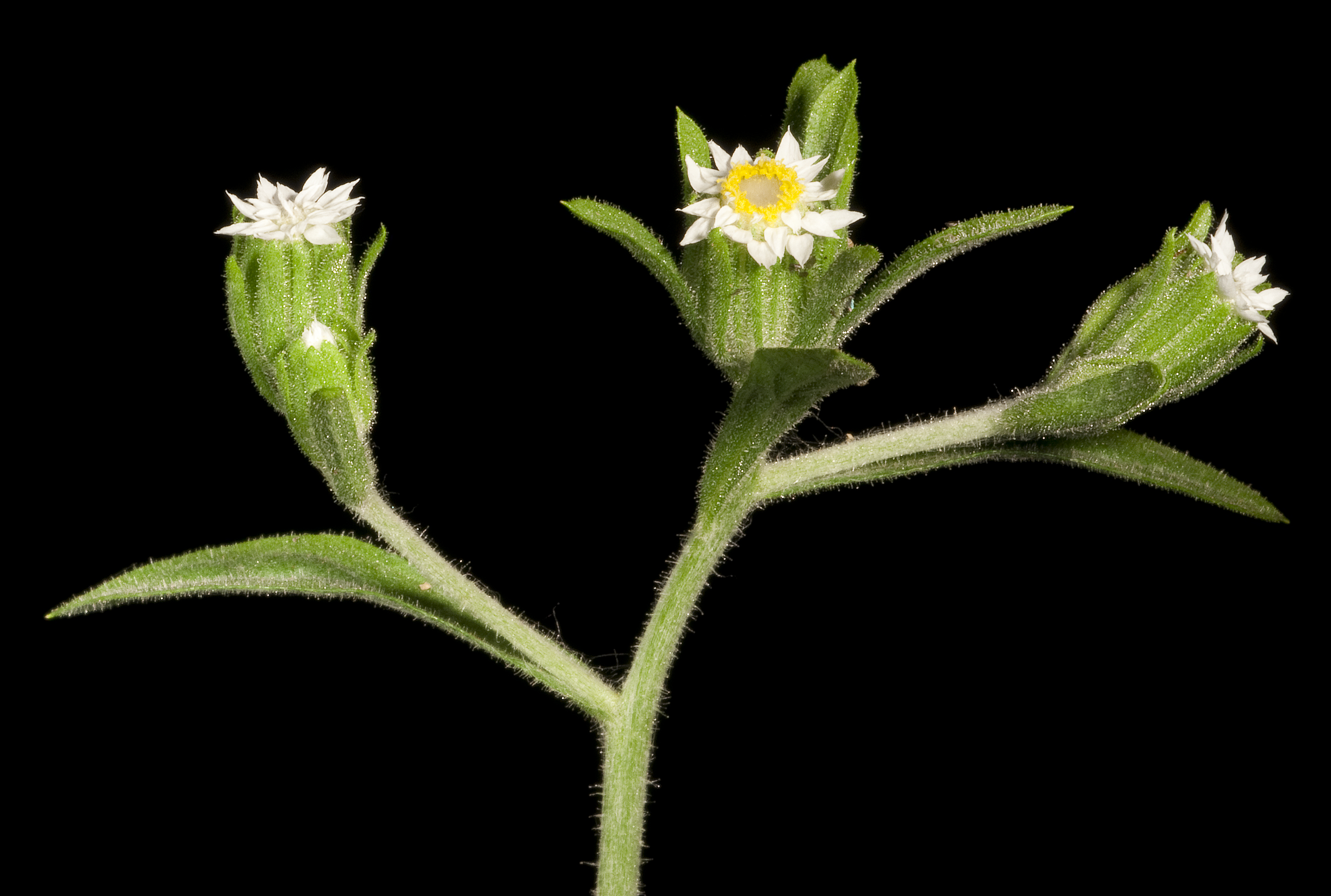
- Ixiolaena viscosa

Scientific classification
- Kingdom: Plantae
- Clade: Tracheophytes
- Clade: Angiosperms
- Clade: Eudicots
- Clade: Asterids
- Order: Asterales
- Family: Asteraceae
- Subfamily: Asteroideae
- Tribe: Gnaphalieae
- Genus: Ixiolaena; Benth.

Synonyms
- Gnaphalium sect. Ixiolaena (Benth.) Kuntze; Podotheca sect. Ixiolaena (Benth.) Baill.

= Ixiolaena =

Genus of flowering plants

Ixiolaena is a genus of flowering plants in the daisy family. The genus is native to Australia.

== Species ==
As of May 2024, Plants of the World Online accepted two species:

- Ixiolaena chloroleuca Haegi
- Ixiolaena viscosa Benth.
