= Syncephalum =

Scientific classification
- Kingdom: Plantae
- Clade: Tracheophytes
- Clade: Angiosperms
- Clade: Eudicots
- Clade: Asterids
- Order: Asterales
- Family: Asteraceae
- Subfamily: Asteroideae
- Tribe: Gnaphalieae
- Genus: Syncephalum; DC.

Type species
- Syncephalum bojeri DC.

Synonyms
- Astephanocarpa Baker

Genus of plants

Syncephalum is a genus of flowering plants in the pussy's-toes tribe within the family Asteraceae.

== Species ==
As of April 2023, Plants of the World Online accepted five species:

- Syncephalum arbutifolium Humbert
- Syncephalum candidum Humbert
- Syncephalum stenoclinoides Humbert
- Syncephalum suborbiculare Humbert
- Syncephalum tsinjoarivense Humbert
