= Syncephalum arbutifolium =

Scientific classification
- Kingdom: Plantae
- Clade: Tracheophytes
- Clade: Angiosperms
- Clade: Eudicots
- Clade: Asterids
- Order: Asterales
- Family: Asteraceae
- Genus: Syncephalum
- Species: S. arbutifolium

Binomial name
- Syncephalum arbutifolium (Baker) Humbert

Synonyms
- Astephanocarpa arbutifolia Baker; Syncephalum bojeri DC.; Syncephalum perrieri Humbert

Species of plant

Syncephalum arbutifolium is a species of flowering plant in the family Asteraceae, native to Madagascar. It was first described by John Gilbert Baker in 1887 as Astephanocarpa arbutifolia.
