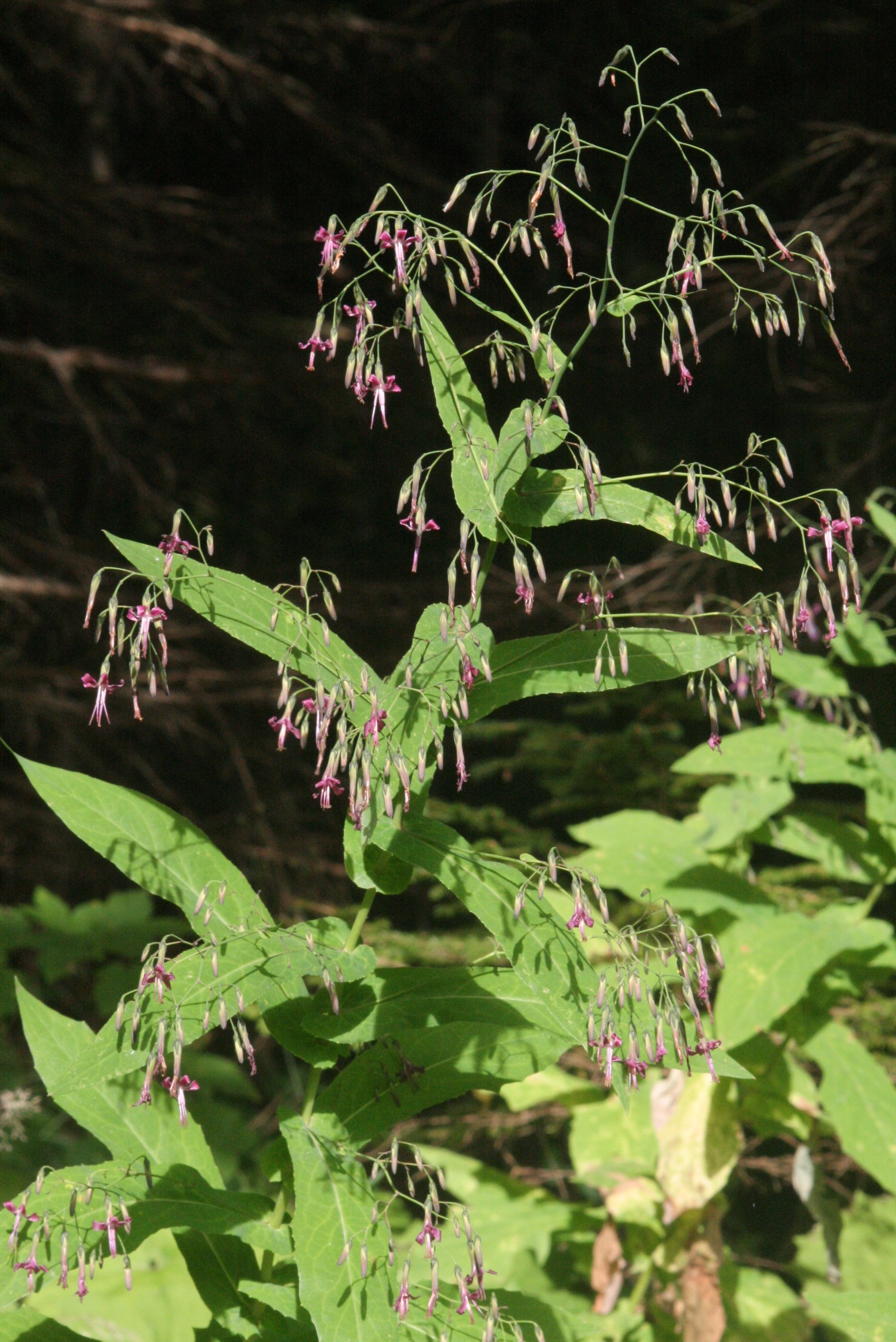
- Prenanthes purpurea

Scientific classification
- Kingdom: Plantae
- Clade: Tracheophytes
- Clade: Angiosperms
- Clade: Eudicots
- Clade: Asterids
- Order: Asterales
- Family: Asteraceae
- Subfamily: Cichorioideae
- Tribe: Cichorieae
- Subtribe: Hypochaeridinae
- Genus: Prenanthes; L.

= Prenanthes =

Genus of plants

Prenanthes is a genus of plant in the family Asteraceae, often referred to as rattlesnake root.

Molecular analysis in 2009 revealed that the genus as traditionally envisioned was polyphyletic, meaning that it is a conglomeration of species not closely related to one another. The genus formerly included species now placed in Aetheorhiza, Askellia, Brickellia, Chondrilla, Crepidiastrum, Crepis, Emilia, Erythroseris, Faberia, Hololeion, Hypochaeris, Ixeris, Lactuca, Lapsanastrum, Launaea, Lygodesmia, Nabalus, Notoseris, Paraprenanthes, Parasenecio, Picrosia, Sonchella, Sonchus, Soroseris, Stephanomeria, Trixis, and Youngia.

== Species ==
As of May 2024, Plants of the World Online accepted nine species:

- Prenanthes hookeri C.B.Clarke ex Hook.f.
- Prenanthes mira (Pavlov) Kamelin
- Prenanthes nothae Kurz
- Prenanthes petiolata (K.Koch) Sennikov
- Prenanthes purpurea L.
- Prenanthes steenisii Tjitr.
- Prenanthes stenolimba Steenis
- Prenanthes subpeltata Stebbins
- Prenanthes sumatrana Tjitr.
