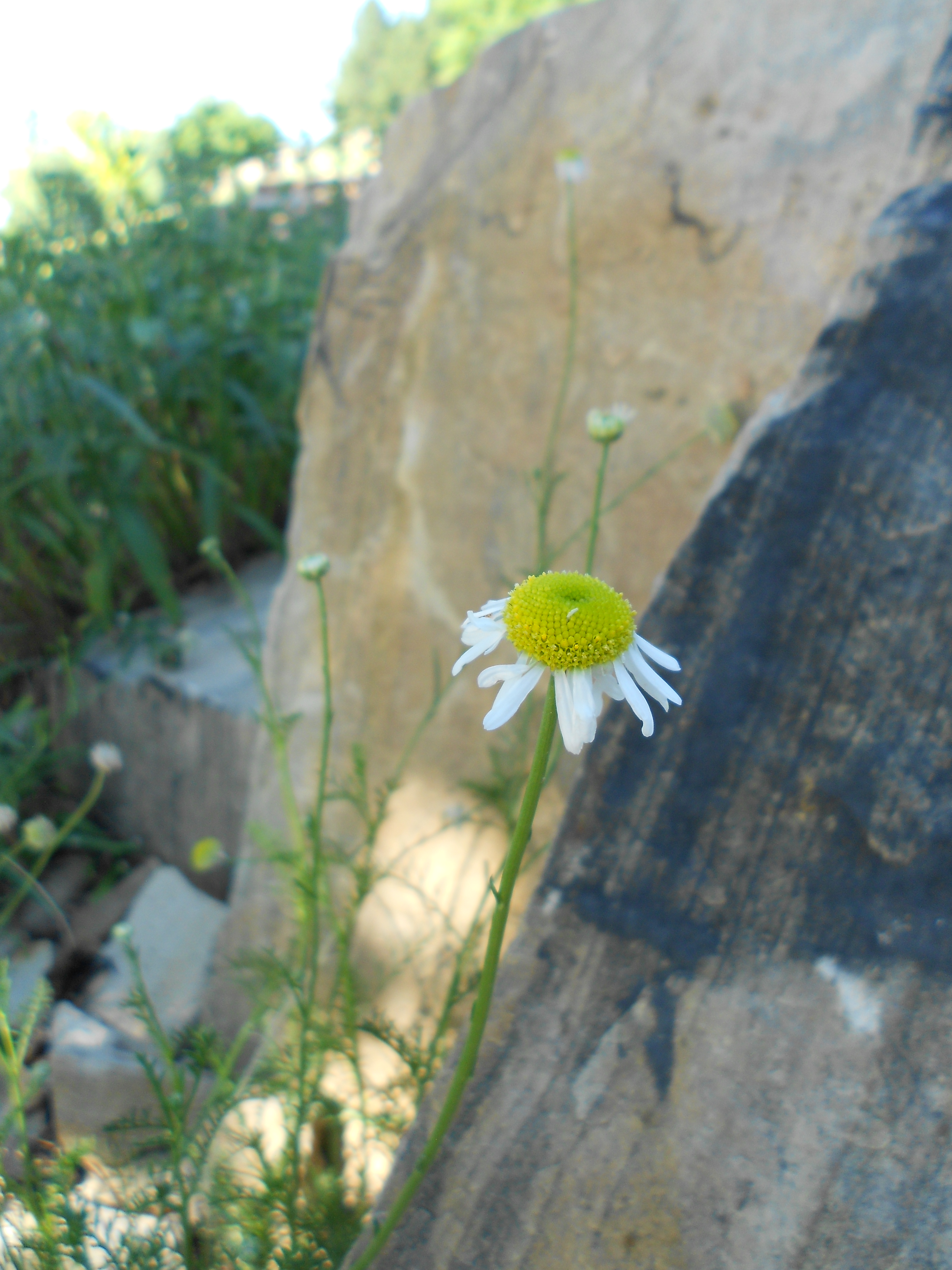
- Lasiospermum bipinnatum

Scientific classification
- Kingdom: Plantae
- Clade: Tracheophytes
- Clade: Angiosperms
- Clade: Eudicots
- Clade: Asterids
- Order: Asterales
- Family: Asteraceae
- Subfamily: Asteroideae
- Tribe: Anthemideae
- Genus: Lasiospermum; Lag. 1816, conserved name not Fisch. 1812

Type species
- Lasiospermum pedunculare Lag.

Synonyms
- Eriocarpha Lag. ex DC.; Eriosphaera F.Dietr.

= Lasiospermum =

Genus of flowering plants

Lasiospermum (cocoonhead) is a genus of flowering plants in the daisy family.

Species

- Lasiospermum bipinnatum (Thunb.) Druce - Lesotho; introduced in Australia, California
- Lasiospermum brachyglossum DC. - Saudi Arabia, Sinai, Palestine
- Lasiospermum pedunculare Lag. - South Africa
- Lasiospermum poterioides Hutch. - South Africa

Species in homonymic genus

Species included in Lasiospermum Fisch. 1812, now assigned to Lasiospora and Scorzonera

- Lasiospermum angustifolium Fisch. - Scorzonera biebersteinii Lipsch.
- Lasiospermum ensifolium (M.Bieb.) Fisch. - Scorzonera ensifolia M.Bieb.
- Lasiospermum hirtum Fisch. - Lasiospora hirsuta (Gouan) Cass.
