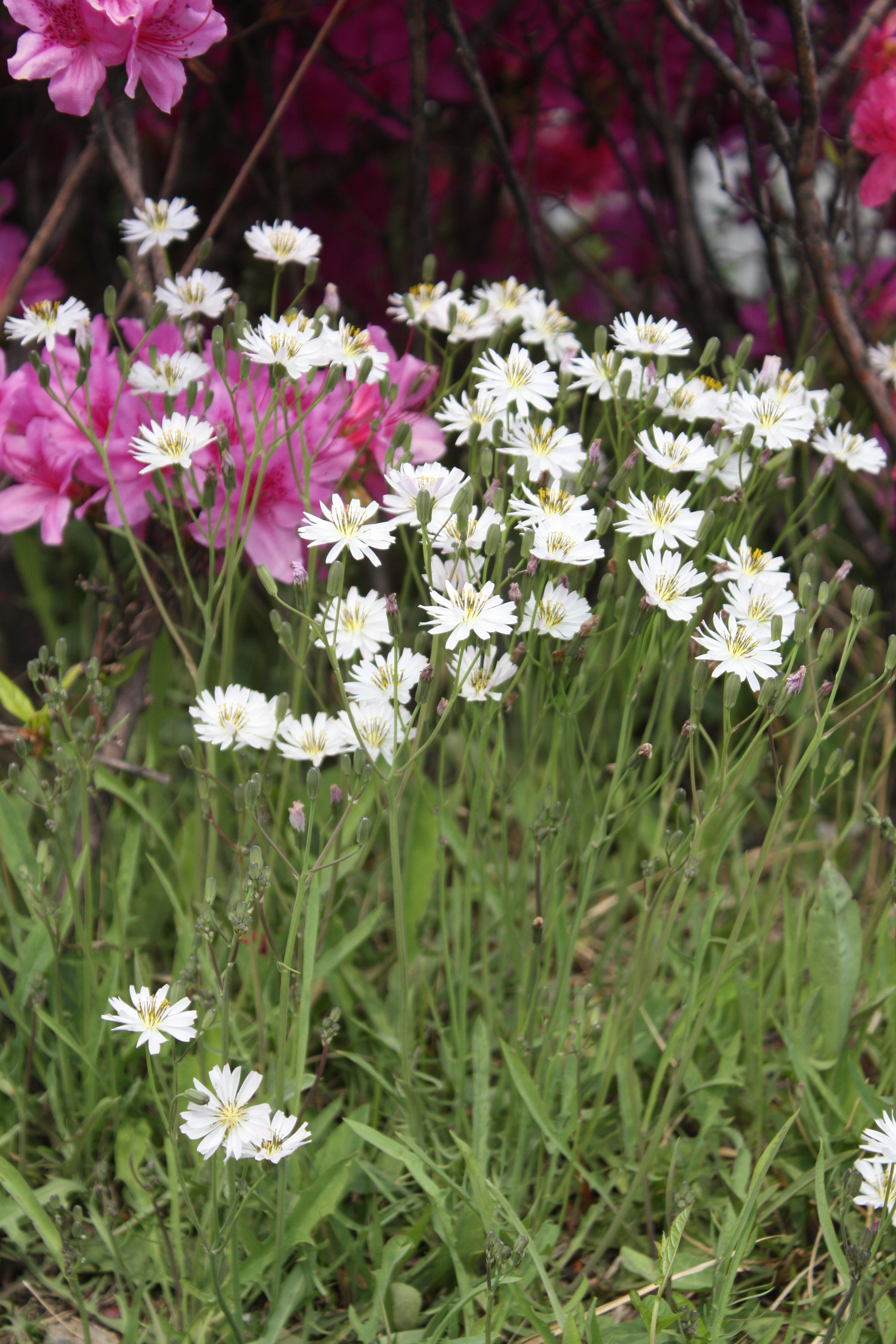
- Ixeris strigosa

Scientific classification
- Kingdom: Plantae
- Clade: Tracheophytes
- Clade: Angiosperms
- Clade: Eudicots
- Clade: Asterids
- Order: Asterales
- Family: Asteraceae
- Subfamily: Cichorioideae
- Tribe: Cichorieae
- Subtribe: Crepidinae
- Genus: Ixeris (Cass.) Cass.

Type species
- Ixeris polycephala Cass. ex DC.

Synonyms
- Taraxacum subg. Ixeris Cass.; Chorisma D.Don; Ixeris subg. Euixeris Stebbins; Chorisis DC.; Lactuca sect. Ixeris (Cass.) Benth.

= Ixeris =

Genus of flowering plants

Ixeris is a genus of Asian flowering plants in the family Asteraceae.

Concepts of which species should be included in the genus have changed in recent years because of the use of molecular investigations. Numerous species formerly regarded as members of Ixeris have been moved to other genera; (Agoseris, Crepidiastrum, Ixeridium, Lactuca, Paraixeris, Paraprenanthes, Sonchella or Youngia). Species remaining in Ixeris or of uncertain affiliations are listed below.

Species

- Ixeris chinensis (Thunb. ex Thunb.) Nakai
- Ixeris × chinodebilis Kitam.
- Ixeris debilis (Thunb. ex Thunb.) A.Gray
- Ixeris gracilis (DC.) Stebbins
- Ixeris graminifolia (Ledeb.) Kitag.
- Ixeris gregorii Hance
- Ixeris integra (Merr.) Stebbins
- Ixeris japonica (Burm.f.) Nakai
- Ixeris keiskeana (Maxim.) Stebbins
- Ixeris kimurana Kitam.
- Ixeris lanceolata Chang
- Ixeris litoralis Kitam.
- Ixeris longirostra Nakai
- Ixeris longirostrata (Hayata) Nakai
- Ixeris microcephala Nakai
- Ixeris musashensis Makino & Hisauti ex Makino & Hisauti
- Ixeris × nakazonei (Kitam.) Kitam.
- Ixeris nikoensis Nakai
- Ixeris podlechii Rech.f.
- Ixeris polycephala Cass.
- Ixeris repens (L.) A.Gray
- Ixeris retrorsidens (Merr.) Stebbins
- Ixeris riparia (Kerr) Stebbins
- Ixeris × sekimotoi Kitam.
- Ixeris sonchifolia (Maxim.) Hance
- Ixeris stolonifera A.Gray
- Ixeris strigosa (Lév. & Vaniot) J.H.Pak & Kawano
- Ixeris tamagawaensis (Makino) Kitam.
- Ixeris tapetodes (Boiss.) Rech.f.
- Ixeris trifida Kitam.
- Ixeris versicolor (Fisch. ex Link) Kitam.
