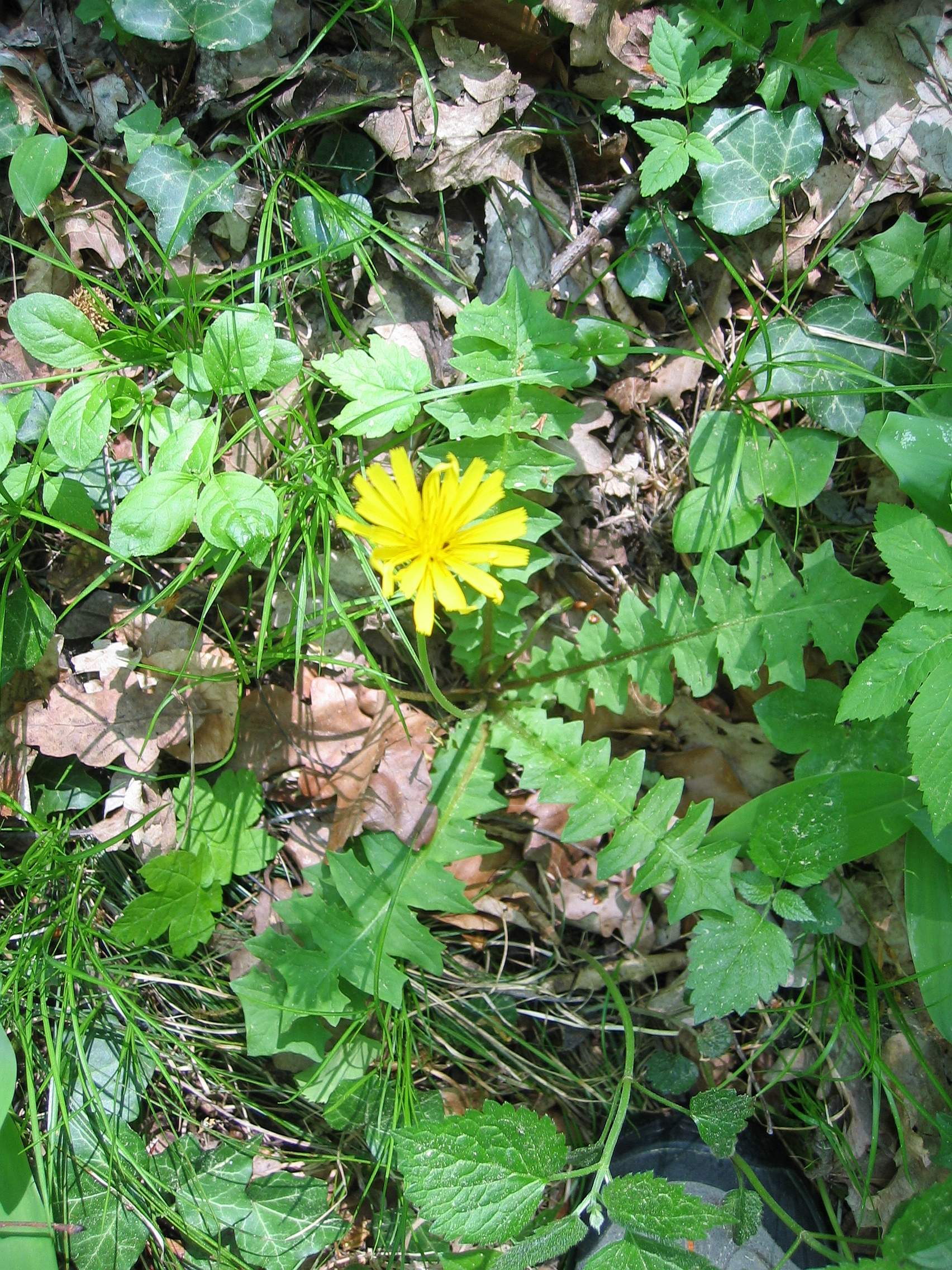

Scientific classification
- Kingdom: Plantae
- Clade: Embryophytes
- Clade: Tracheophytes
- Clade: Angiosperms
- Clade: Eudicots
- Clade: Asterids
- Order: Asterales
- Family: Asteraceae
- Subfamily: Cichorioideae
- Tribe: Cichorieae
- Subtribe: Hyoseridinae
- Genus: Aposeris; Neck. ex Cass.
- Species: A. foetida

Binomial name
- Aposeris foetida (L.) Cass. ex Less.

Synonyms
- Aposeris Neck. 1790, rejected name; Ageratum glanduliferum Sch.Bip. ex Benth. & Hook.f.; Broteroa DC.; Cichorium aposeris E.H.L.Krause, illegitimate name; Achyrocoma Cass.; Aposeris foetida Cass., not validly published; Adenimesa Nieuwl.

= Aposeris =

Genus of flowering plants

Aposeris is a genus of flowering plants in the family Asteraceae.

There is only one known species, Aposeris foetida, widespread across much of Europe.

The name was coined by Necker in 1790, but all names in that publication have been declared rejected. Therefore Cassini's 1827 usage is considered the validation of the name. Cassini did not, however, did not validly republish Necker's species name, so Lessing is credited with the formal recombination
