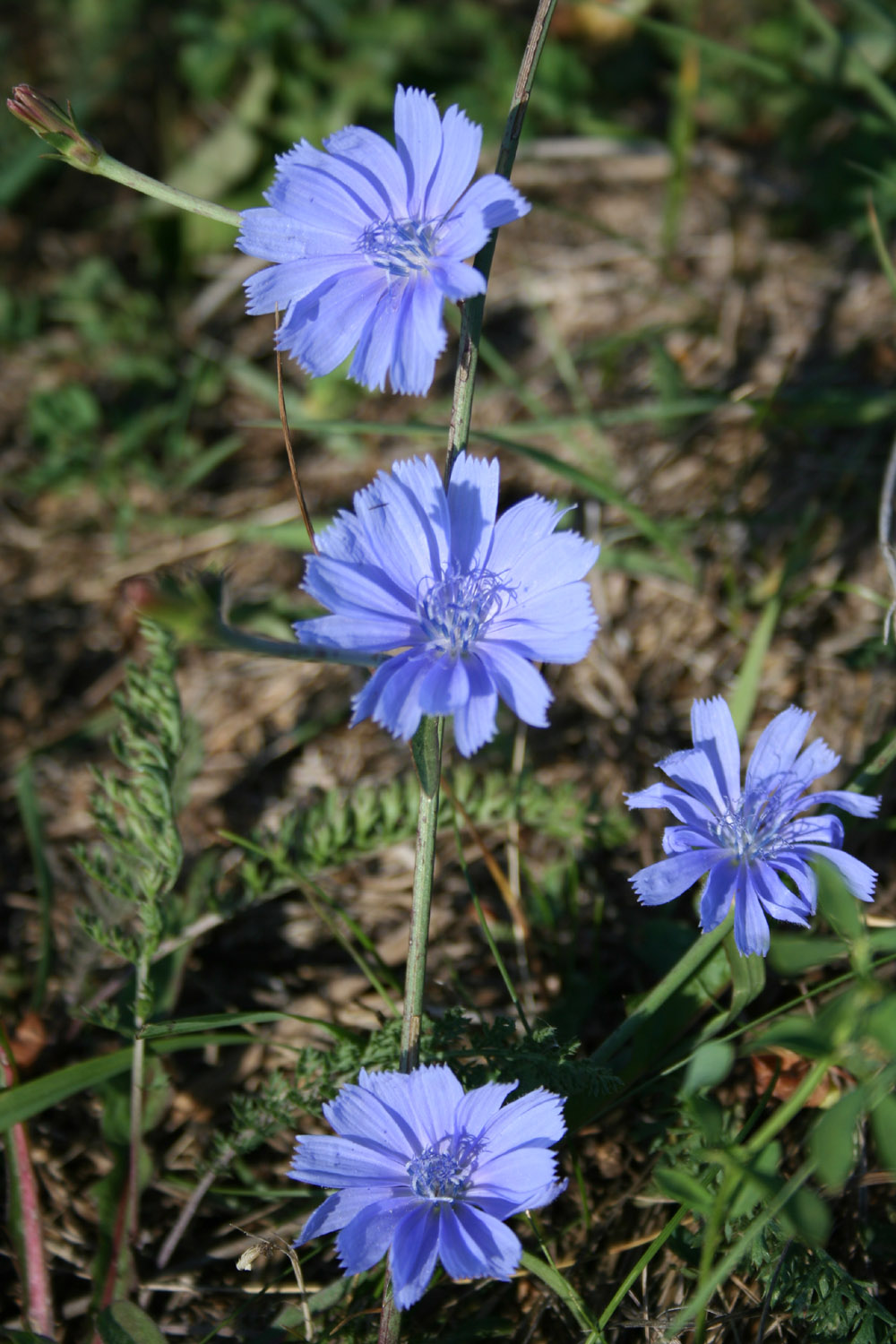
- Cichorium intybus (chicory)

Scientific classification
- Kingdom: Plantae
- Clade: Embryophytes
- Clade: Tracheophytes
- Clade: Angiosperms
- Clade: Eudicots
- Clade: Asterids
- Order: Asterales
- Family: Asteraceae
- Subfamily: Cichorioideae
- Tribe: Cichorieae (Lam. & DC. 1806)

Subtribes
- Chondrillinae; Cichoriinae; Crepidinae; Hieraciinae; Hyoseridinae; Hypochaeridinae; Lactucinae; Microseridinae; Scolyminae; Scorzonerinae; Warioniinae

Synonyms
- Lactuceae Cassini

= Cichorieae =

Tribe of flowering plants

The Cichorieae (also called Lactuceae) are a tribe in the plant family Asteraceae that includes 93 genera, more than 1,600 sexually reproductive species and more than 7,000 apomictic species. They are found primarily in temperate regions of the Eastern Hemisphere. Cichorieae all have milky latex and flowerheads that only contain one type of floret. The genera Gundelia and Warionia only have disk florets, while all other genera only have ligulate florets. The genera that contain most species are Taraxacum (Crepidinae subtribe) with about 1,600 apomictic species, Hieracium with about 770 sexually reproducing and 5,200 apomictic species, and Pilosella with 110 sexually reproducing and 700 apomictic species (both Hieraciinae). Well-known members include lettuce, chicory, dandelion, and salsify.

== Description ==
Most species are herbaceous, perennial, short-lived or annual plants, rarely subshrubs, shrubs or vines. All Cichorieae-species have latex canals in both the roots, stems and leaves, and this occurs to be a unique character among the Asteraceae, although latex as such occurs rather widespread in this family. The leaves are in a rosette or alternately set along the stem, but this is the dominant situation in the Asteraceae. The only exception in the Cichorieae are the opposite lower leaves of Shinnersoseris. Traditionally, the Cichorieae consisted of taxa with flowerheads only containing bisexual ligulate florets (having a strap-shaped corolla with five teeth at its tip), a rare character that is further present only in the genera Catamixis, Glossarion, Hyaloseris (Mutisieae), and Fitchia (Heliantheae). However, recently the genera Gundelia and Warionia have been included in the Cichorieae, and those two genera have heads containing only disk flowers.

== Taxonomy ==
In his Elemens de botanique ou methode pour connoître les plantes of 1694, Joseph Pitton de Tournefort first described this group as a taxonomic unit, calling it the "13th class of the plant kingdom". He only assigned taxa to it that are still regarded part of the Cichorieae today. Sébastien Vaillant gave this group the name "Cichoracées" in 1723. Since the name predates the start of the Linnean nomenclature in 1753, it is not valid, but Jean-Baptiste Lamarck and Augustin Pyramus de Candolle used the name Cichorieae in the Synopsis Plantarium in Flora Gallica Descriptarum, published in 1806. The name Lactuceae that was cioned by Henri Cassini in 1819, comprises the same group of taxa and is thus a synonym. Obviously, over the centuries since the group was first identified, numerous new taxa have been described that are now included in the Cichorieae, and the group has been divided in different subgroups using various morphological character states by authors such as Cassini, David Don, Christian Friedrich Lessing, A.P. De Candolle, George Bentham and Karl August Otto Hoffmann.

=== Phylogeny ===
Genetic analysis has increased the insight in the phylogenetic relationships between the Cichorieae. The following trees together represent those insights.

==== Subtribes ====
- tribe Cichorieae
  - - - - - - subtribe Cichoriinae
            - subtribe Microseridinae
          - subtribe Hieraciinae
        - - - - - subtribe Crepidinae
                - subtribe Chondrillinae
              - subtribe Hypochaeridinae
            - subtribe Hyoseridinae
          - subtribe Lactucinae
      - subtribe Scolyminae
    - subtribe Scorzonerinae
  - subtribe Warioniinae

==== Basal subtribes ====
- tribe Cichorieae
  - - - - subtribes Cichoriinae, Hieraciinae
          and Microseridinae
        - subtribes Chondrillinae, Crepidinae,
          Hyoseridinae, Hypochaeridinae and Lactucinae
      - subtribe Scolyminae
        - Gundelia tournefortii
        - - Catananche
          - - Scolymus
            - Hymenonema
    - subtribe Scorzonerinae
      - - - - Epilasia
            - Tragopogon
          - - Koelpinia
            - Pterachaenia stewartii
        - - - Geropogon hybridus
            - Podospermum
          - - Scorzonera
            - Takhtajaniantha pusilla
      - - Tourneuxia
        - Lasiospora
  - subtribe Warioniinae
    Warionia saharae

==== Chondrillinae, Crepidinae, Hyoseridinae, Hypochaeridinae, Lactucinae ====
- - - subtribe Hyoseridinae
      - Aposeris foetida
      - - Hyoseris
        - - Reichardia
          - - Launaea
            - Sonchus
    - - - subtribe Crepidinae
          - - - Garhadiolus
              - - Lagoseriopsis
                - - Heteracia szovitsii
                  - Heteroderis pusilla
            - - Syncalathium
              - - Hololeion
                - - Nabalus
                  - Soroseris
          - - - Acanthocephalus
              - - Ixeris
                - Taraxacum
            - - - Youngia
                - Crepidiastrum
              - - Askellia
                - - Crepis
                  - - Lagoseris
                    - - Rhagadiolus
                      - Lapsana
        - subtribe Chondrillinae
          - - - Chondrilla
              - Willemetia
            - Phitosia crocifolia
      - subtribe Hypochaeridinae
        - Urospermum
        - - Prenanthes purpurea
          - - Scorzoneroides
            - - Hypochaeris
              - - - Helminthotheca
                  - Picris
                - - Hedypnois
                  - Leontodon
  - subtribe Lactucinae
    - Notoseris
    - - Cicerbita
      - Lactuca

==== Cichoriinae, Hieraciinae and Microseridinae ====
- - subtribe Hieraciinae
    - Schlagintweitia
    - - Andryala
      - - Hieracium
        - - Hispidella hispanica
          - Pilosella
  - - subtribe Cichoriinae
      - - Phalacroseris bolanderi
        - - Erythroseris
          - Cichorium
      - - Rothmaleria granatensis
        - - Arnoseris minima
          - Tolpis
    - subtribe Microseridinae
      - - - - Picrosia
            - Pyrrhopappus
          - - - Chaetadelpha wheeleri
              - Lygodesmia
            - Shinnersoseris rostrata
        - - Krigia
          - - Marshalljohnstonia gypsophila
            - Pinaropappus
      - - - - - Agoseris
              - Nothocalais
            - - Microseris
              - Uropappus
          - - - Atrichoseris platyphylla
              - Malacothrix
            - - Munzothamnus blairii
              - - Stephanomeria
                - - Rafinesquia
                  - - Pleiacanthus spinosus
                    - Prenanthella exigua
        - Glyptopleura

=== Alphabetic list of genera ===
- Acanthocephalus
- Actites
- Agoseris
- Andryala
- Anisocoma
- Aposeris
- Arnoseris
- Atrichoseris
- Calycoseris
- Catananche
- Chaetadelpha
- Chlorocrepis
- Chondrilla
- Chorisis
- Cicerbita
- Cichorium
- Crepidiastrum
- Crepis
- Dubyaea
- Embergeria
- Epilasia
- Erythroseris
- Faberia
- Faberiopsis
- Garhadiolus
- Geropogon
- Glyptopleura
- Gundelia
- Hedypnois
- Helminthotheca
- Heteracia
- Heteroderis
- Hexinia
- Hieracium
- Hispidella
- Hymenonema
- Hyoseris
- Hypochaeris
- Ixeridium
- Ixeris
- Kirkianella
- Koelpinia
- Krigia
- Lactuca
- Lagedium
- Lapsana
- Lapsanastrum
- Lasiospora
- Launaea
- Leontodon
- Lygodesmia
- Malacothrix
- Marshalljohnstonia
- Microseris
- Munzothamnus
- Mycelis
- Nabalus
- Nothocalais
- Notoseris
- Paraixeris
- Paramicrorhynchus
- Paraprenanthes
- Phalacroseris
- Phitosia
- Picris
- Pilosella
- Pinaropappus
- Pleiacanthus
- Podospermum
- Prenanthella
- Prenanthes
- Pterachaenia
- Pterocypsela
- Pyrrhopappus
- Rafinesquia
- Reichardia
- Rhagadiolus
- Rothmaleria
- Scolymus
- Scorzonera
- Scorzoneroides
- Shinnersoseris
- Sonchus
- Soroseris
- Stebbinsia
- Stebbinsoseris
- Stenoseris
- Stephanomeria
- Steptorhamphus
- Syncalathium
- Takhtajaniantha
- Taraxacum
- Tolpis
- Tourneuxia
- Tragopogon
- Uropappus
- Urospermum
- Warionia
- Willemetia
- Youngia
