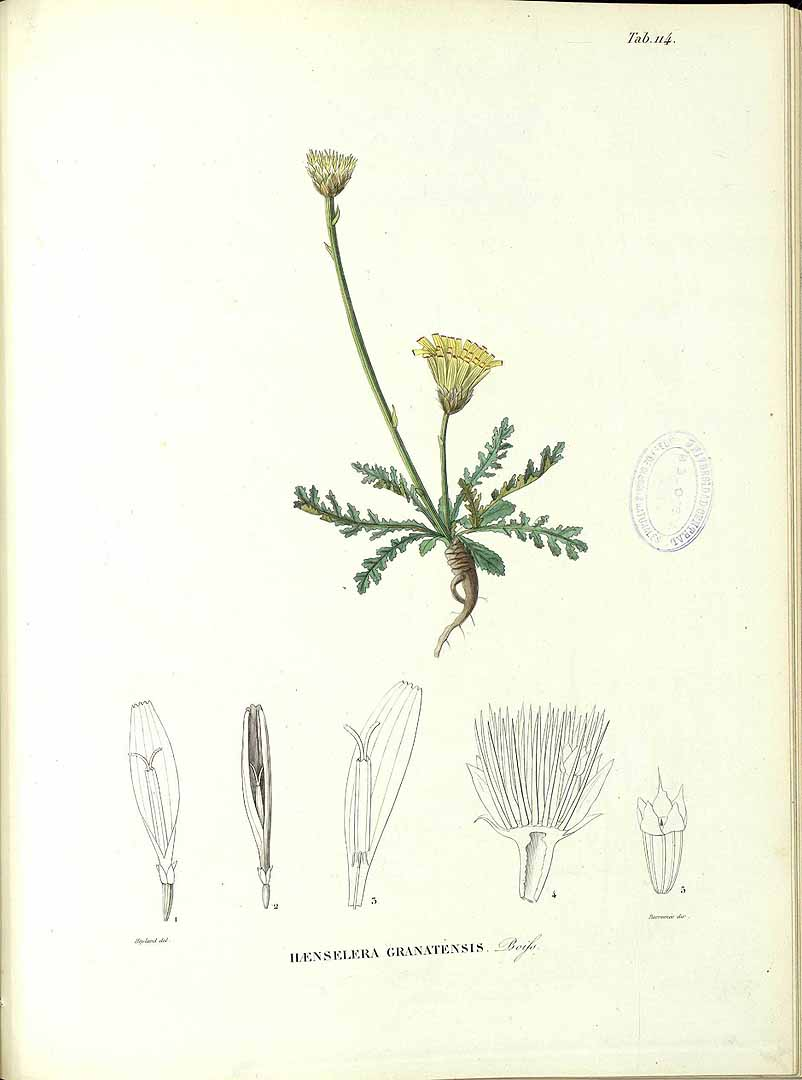

Scientific classification
- Kingdom: Plantae
- Clade: Embryophytes
- Clade: Tracheophytes
- Clade: Angiosperms
- Clade: Eudicots
- Clade: Asterids
- Order: Asterales
- Family: Asteraceae
- Subfamily: Cichorioideae
- Tribe: Cichorieae
- Subtribe: Cichoriinae
- Genus: Rothmaleria; Font Quer
- Species: R. granatensis

Binomial name
- Rothmaleria granatensis (Boiss. ex DC.) Font Quer

Synonyms
- Haenselera Boiss. ex DC. 1838, illegitimate homonym not Lag. 1816 (Apiaceae); Haenselera granatensis Boiss. ex DC.; Haenselera elatior Willk.

= Rothmaleria =

Genus of flowering plants

Rothmaleria is a genus of flowering plants in the family Asteraceae.

Species

There is only one known species, Rothmaleria granatensis, native to Spain.
