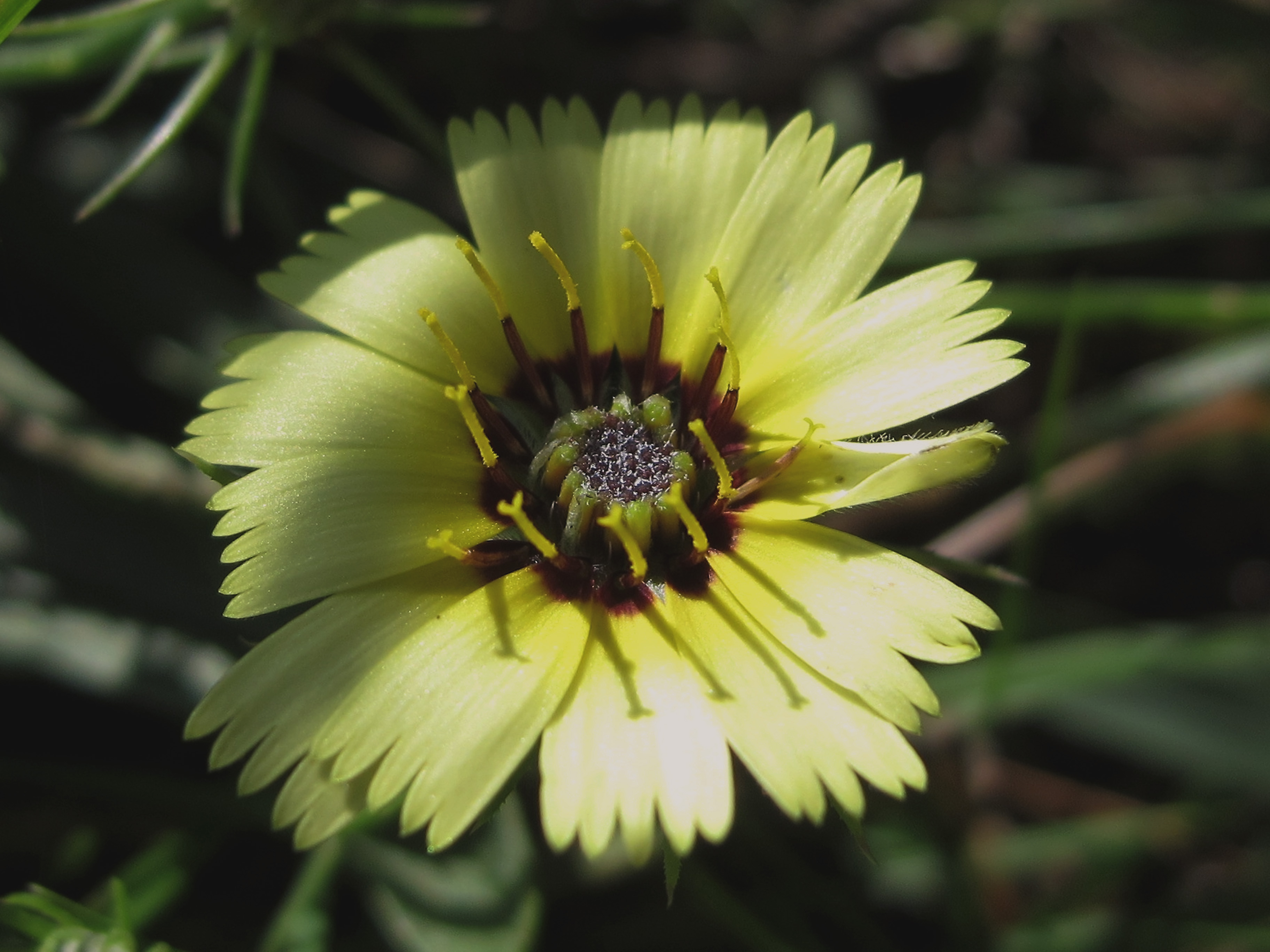
- Hispidella hispanica

Scientific classification
- Kingdom: Plantae
- Clade: Tracheophytes
- Clade: Angiosperms
- Clade: Eudicots
- Clade: Asterids
- Order: Asterales
- Family: Asteraceae
- Subfamily: Cichorioideae
- Tribe: Cichorieae
- Subtribe: Hieraciinae
- Genus: Hispidella; Barnadez ex Lam.
- Species: H. hispanica

Binomial name
- Hispidella hispanica Lam.

Synonyms
- Bolosia piloselloides Pourr. ex Willk.; Hispidella welwitschii Rupr.; Arctotis hispidella Juss. ex DC.; Hispidella barnardesii Cass.

= Hispidella =

Genus of flowering plants

Hispidella is a genus of flowering plants in the family Asteraceae. The genus is monotypic with only one known species, Hispidella hispanica, native to the Iberian Peninsula (Portugal and Spain).
