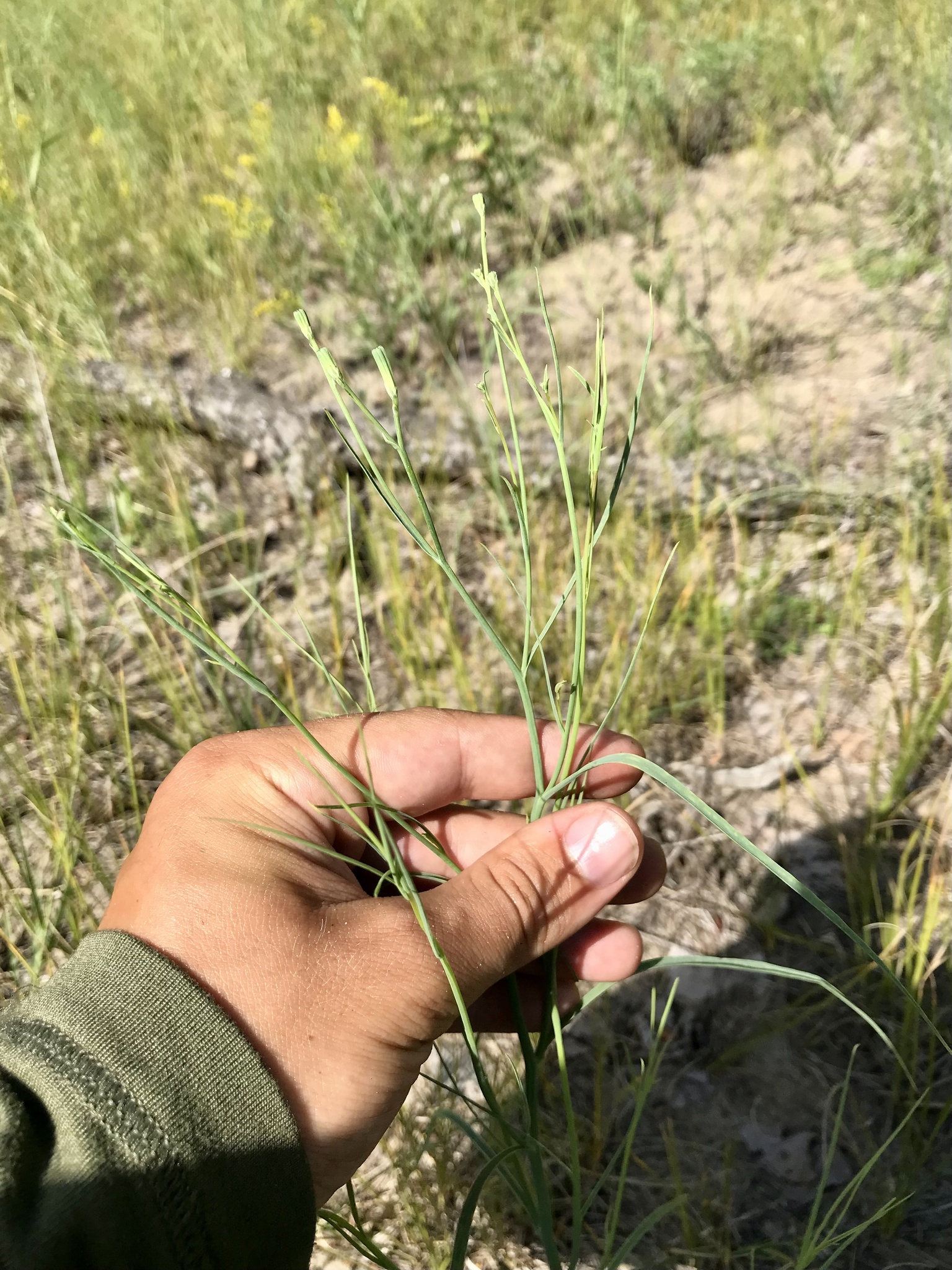
- Shinnersoseris rostrata

Conservation status
- Secure (NatureServe)

Scientific classification
- Kingdom: Plantae
- Clade: Tracheophytes
- Clade: Angiosperms
- Clade: Eudicots
- Clade: Asterids
- Order: Asterales
- Family: Asteraceae
- Subfamily: Cichorioideae
- Tribe: Cichorieae
- Subtribe: Microseridinae
- Genus: Shinnersoseris; Tomb
- Species: S. rostrata

Binomial name
- Shinnersoseris rostrata (A.Gray) Tomb

Synonyms
- Lygodesmia juncea var. rostrata A.Gray; Lygodesmia rostrata (A.Gray) A.Gray

= Shinnersoseris =

Genus of plants

Shinnersoseris is a genus of flowering plants in the family Asteraceae.

There is only one known species, Shinnersoseris rostrata, with the common names of beaked skeletonweed and annual skeleton-weed. It is native to the Great Plains of central North America (Alberta, Saskatchewan, Manitoba, United States (ND SD MN IA NE KS OK TX CO WY UT)).

It was formerly in the genus Lygodesmia.

== Description ==
Shinnersoseris rostrata is an annual with long branches with long linear leaves, the branches end with five or more pink flowers. Plants are uncommon and populations are local being generally restricted to sand dunes of the Great Plains. It is a threatened species in Minnesota, where it exists naturally on one sand dune complex in the extreme western part of the state. In Minnesota it is found on unstable sand dunes where wind blowouts produce shifting sand, the colonies are threatened by the suppression of fire which allows grasses and woody plants to take over the habitat.
