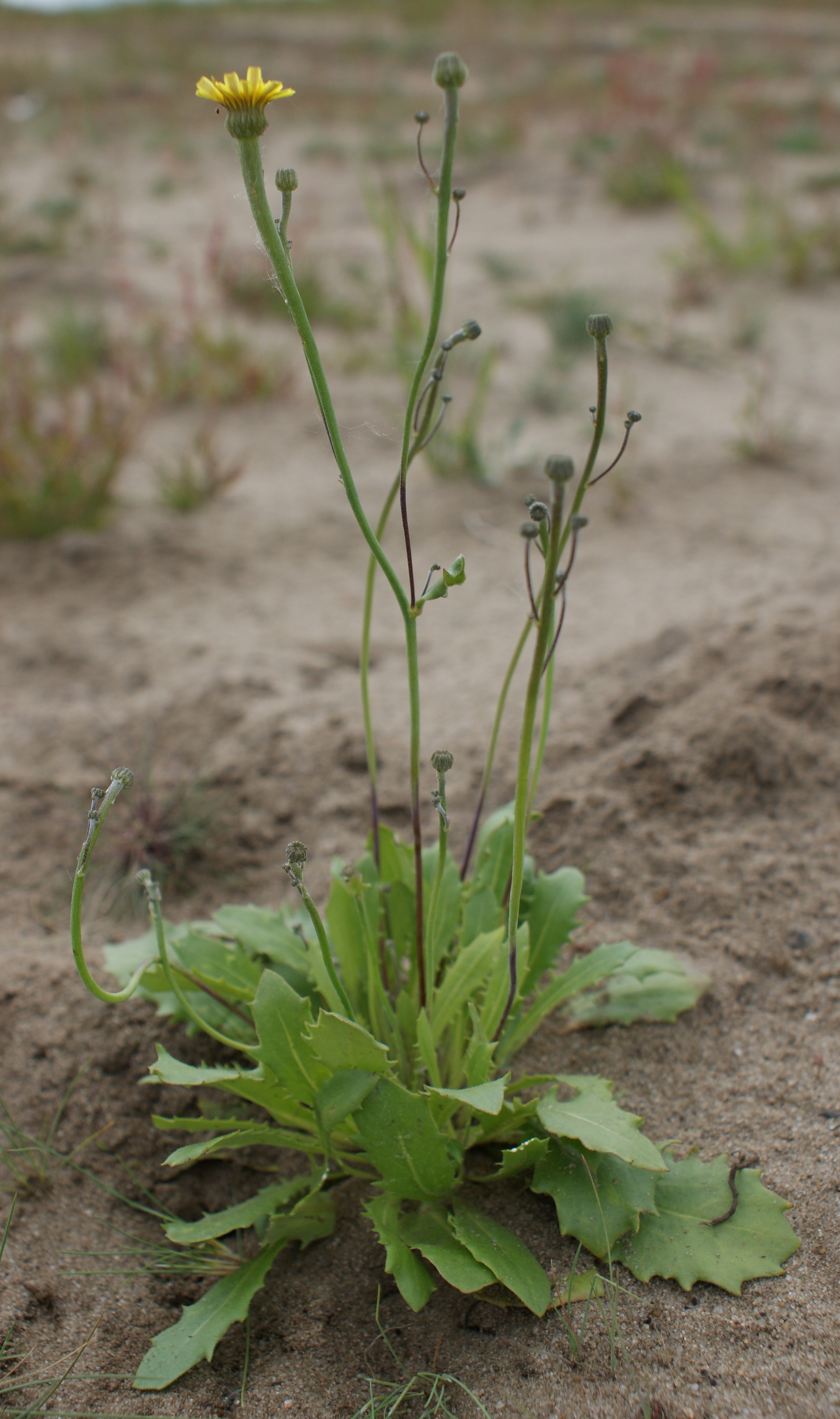

Scientific classification
- Kingdom: Plantae
- Clade: Tracheophytes
- Clade: Angiosperms
- Clade: Eudicots
- Clade: Asterids
- Order: Asterales
- Family: Asteraceae
- Subfamily: Cichorioideae
- Tribe: Cichorieae
- Subtribe: Cichoriinae
- Genus: Arnoseris; Gaertn.
- Species: A. minima

Binomial name
- Arnoseris minima (L.) Schweigg. & Korte

Synonyms
- Hyoseris minima L.; Hyoseris sprengelii Steud.; Lapsana gracilis Lam.; Arnoseris clavata Bubani; Hyoseris exigua Salisb.; Lapsana pusilla Willd.; Arnoseris pusilla Gaertn.; Lapsana minima (L.) All.; Cichorium arnoseris E.H.L.Krause

= Arnoseris =

Genus of plants

Arnoseris is a monotypic genus of flowering plants in the family Asteraceae.

The only known species is Arnoseris minima, native to Europe, Morocco, and the Middle East; naturalized in parts of northeastern North America (Nova Scotia, New Brunswick, Prince Edward Island, Maine, New Hampshire, Pennsylvania, Ohio, Michigan). Common names in the United States: dwarf nipplewort or lamb-succory. Common names in the British Isles: lamb's succory.

It has a maximum height of 30 cm (12 in), is herbaceous and does not spread vegetatively.

The species became extinct across the British Isles in 1971. There was an attempt to reintroduce the species, and there has been one recent sighting in England.

Arnoseris minima is an annual weed of cornfields and fallow fields, favouring infertile, sandy, acidic soils.

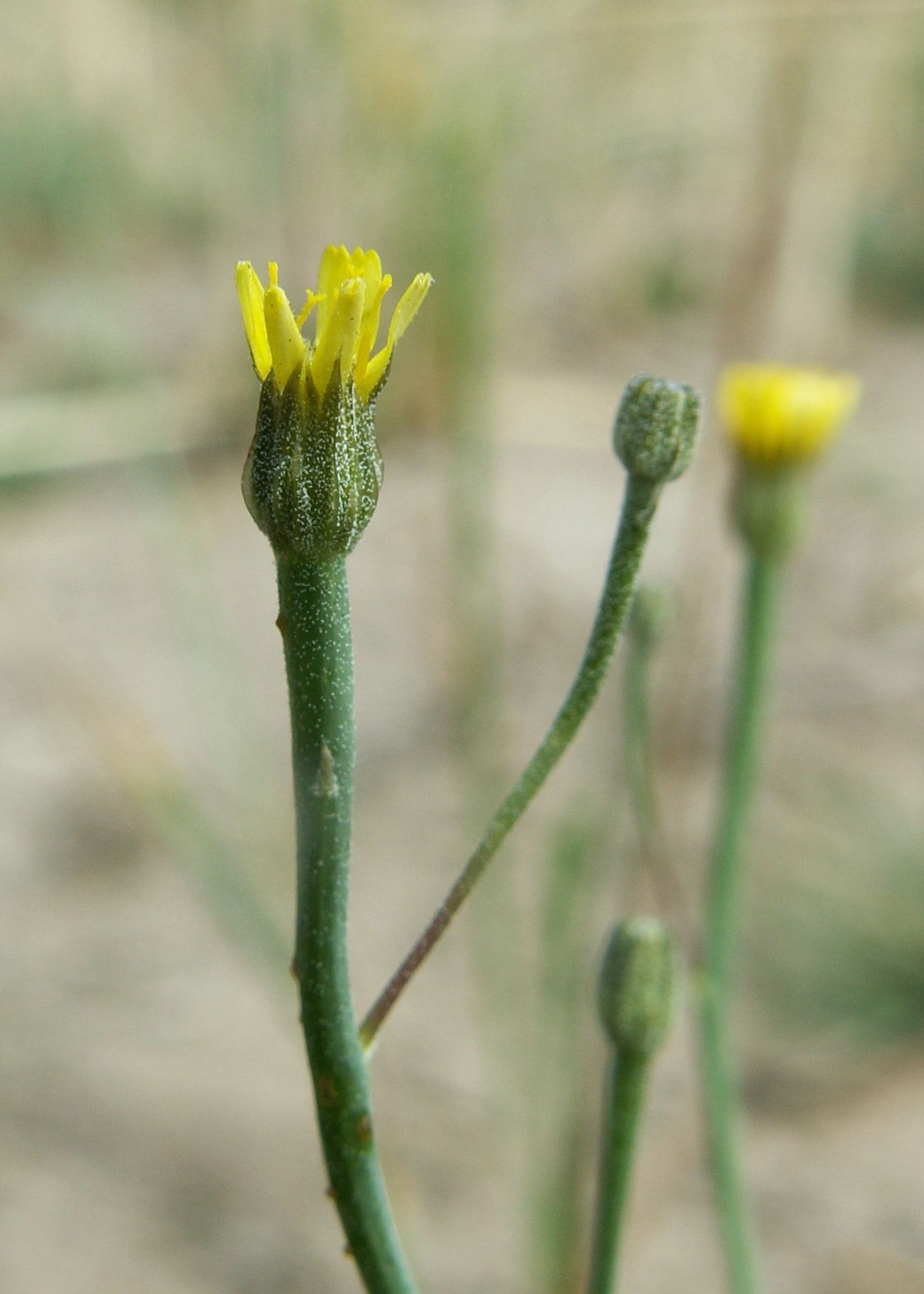
Arnoseris minima photographed in Poland in 2008

The word 'succory' is an anglicization of the French 'cichorie' (chicory). The 'lamb' in the name denotes that it is a chicory only suitable for animal consumption. The genus Arnoseris comes from the Ancient Greek 'arnos seris' meaning 'sheep's endive'. The species epithet minima means 'small'.

== Secondary metabolites ==
Arnoseris minima is a source of the simple coumarin aesculetin and the flavonoids luteolin, luteolin 7-O-β-D-glucoside, luteolin 4'-O-β-D-glucoside, and 3-O-methylquercetin.
