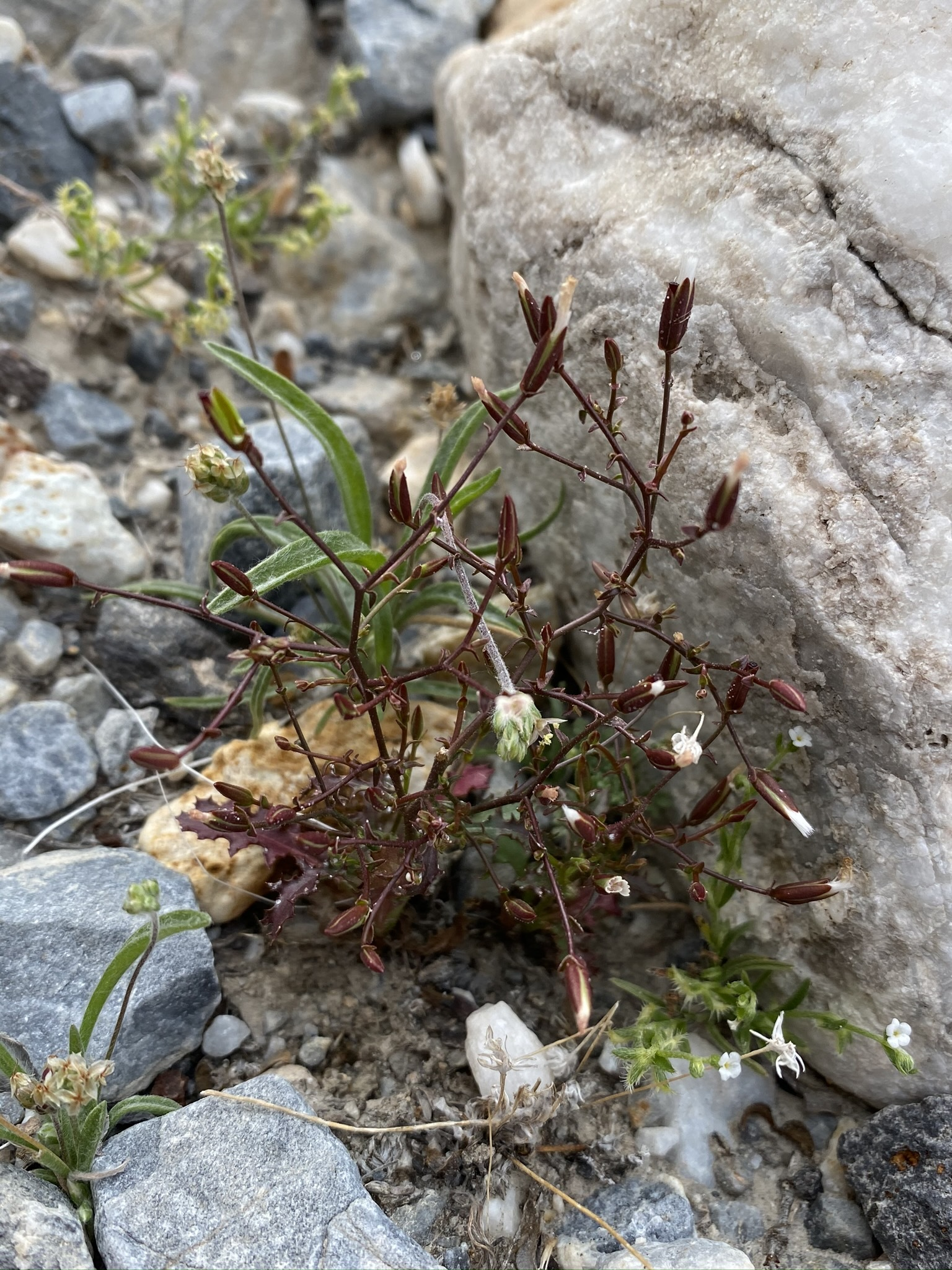

Scientific classification
- Kingdom: Plantae
- Clade: Tracheophytes
- Clade: Angiosperms
- Clade: Eudicots
- Clade: Asterids
- Order: Asterales
- Family: Asteraceae
- Subfamily: Cichorioideae
- Tribe: Cichorieae
- Subtribe: Microseridinae
- Genus: Prenanthella; Rydb.
- Species: P. exigua

Binomial name
- Prenanthella exigua (A.Gray) Rydb.

Synonyms
- Lygodesmia exigua

= Prenanthella =

Genus of flowering plants

Prenanthella is a monotypic genus of flowering plants in the family Asteraceae. It contains the single species Prenanthella exigua, which is known by the common name brightwhite. It is native to the southwestern United States from California to Texas and it is known as far north as Idaho. Its habitat includes desert and woodlands. This annual herb produces a slender, branching stem reaching a maximum height near 40 centimeters. It has a sparse coating of glandular hairs and contains a milky juice. Most of the leaves are located near the base of the stem. They are widely lance-shaped and sometimes divided into segments. Smaller leaves occur higher on the stem; these may be reduced to scale-like structures, leaving the stem mostly bare. The inflorescence is a wide open panicle of several flower heads. Each small head is cylindrical and narrow, its base wrapped in lance-shaped phyllaries. At the tip of the head bloom 3 or 4 flowers, which are ray florets; there are no disc florets. Each floret has is white to pale pink and has a toothed tip. The fruit is a white achene with a pappus of white bristles.
