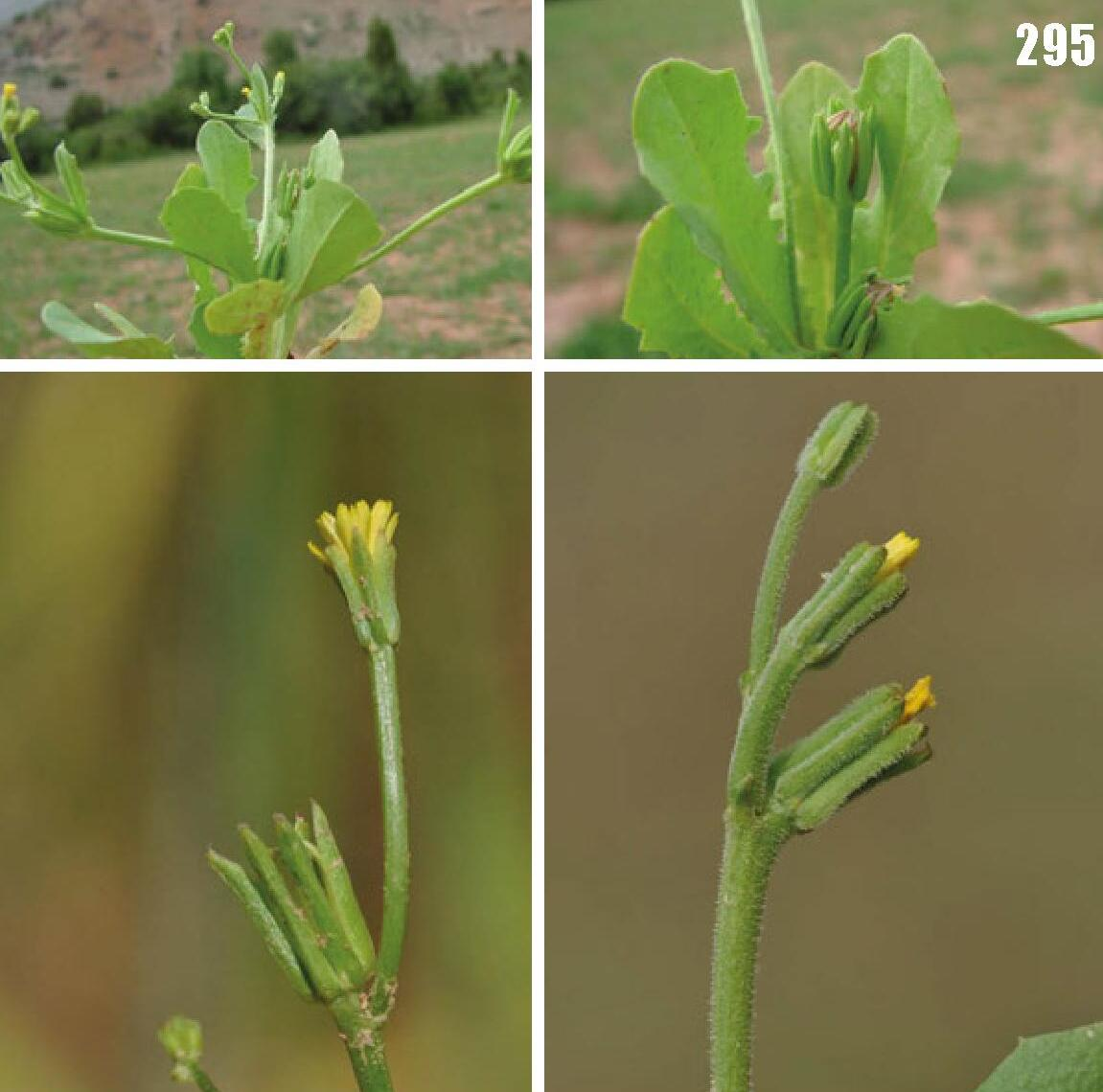
- Garhadiolus hedypnois

Scientific classification
- Kingdom: Plantae
- Clade: Embryophytes
- Clade: Tracheophytes
- Clade: Angiosperms
- Clade: Eudicots
- Clade: Asterids
- Order: Asterales
- Family: Asteraceae
- Subfamily: Cichorioideae
- Tribe: Cichorieae
- Subtribe: Crepidinae
- Genus: Garhadiolus; Jaub. & Spach

= Garhadiolus =

Genus of flowering plants

Garhadiolus is a genus of Asian plants in the tribe Cichorieae within the family Asteraceae.

Species

- Garhadiolus hamosus Boiss. & Hausskn. ex Boiss. & Hausskn. - Turkey, Iraq, Lebanon, Syria
- Garhadiolus hedypnois Jaub. & Spach - Egypt, Arabian Peninsula, Middle East, Caucasus, Cyprus, Iran, Afghanistan, Central Asia
- Garhadiolus minutissimus (Bunge) Kitam. - Jammu-Kashmir, Afghanistan, Iran
- Garhadiolus papposus Boiss. & Buhse - Xinjiang, Kazakhstan, Kyrgyzstan, Tajikistan, Turkmenistan, Uzbekistan, Afghanistan, Dagestan, Armenia, Azerbaijan, Iran, Pakistan, Iraq, Syria

Formerly included

see Crepis

- Garhadiolus acaulis O.Schwarz - Crepis pusilla (Sommier) Merxm.
