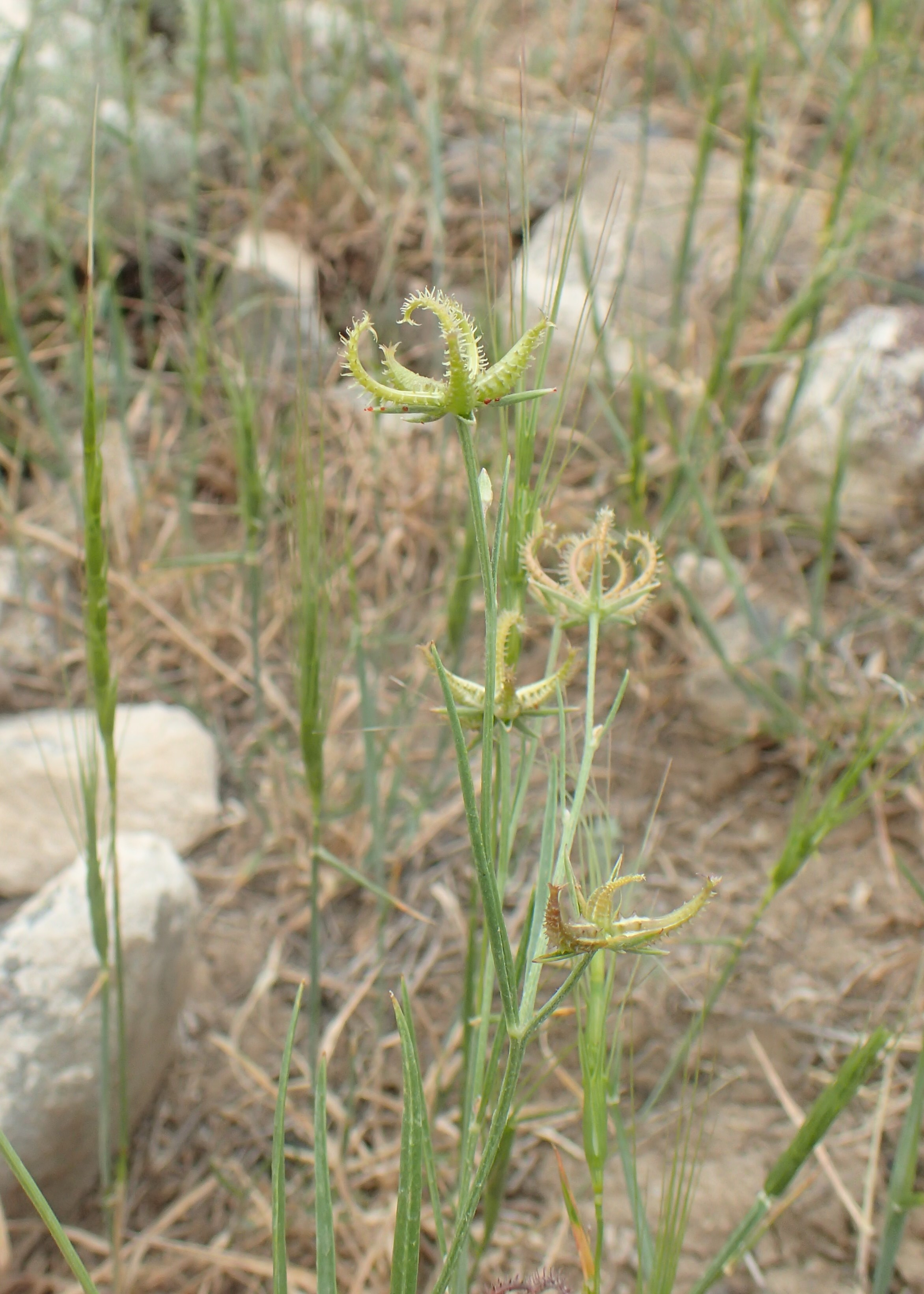
- Koelpinia linearis

Scientific classification
- Kingdom: Plantae
- Clade: Tracheophytes
- Clade: Angiosperms
- Clade: Eudicots
- Clade: Asterids
- Order: Asterales
- Family: Asteraceae
- Subfamily: Cichorioideae
- Tribe: Cichorieae
- Subtribe: Scorzonerinae
- Genus: Koelpinia; Pall.

Type species
- Koelpinia linearis Pall.

= Koelpinia =

Genus of flowering plants

Koelpinia is a genus of flowering plants in the family Asteraceae.

The genus Koelpinia, authored by Peter Simon Pallas, was named after Pallas friend Alexander Bernhard Koelpin (1739–1801), who was a German physician and botanist, and director of the Greifswald Botanic Garden and Arboretum from 1765 to 1767, after which he became professor at Marienstiftsgymnasium in Stettin.

Species

- Koelpinia chrysoglochis Rech.f. - Iran, Iraq
- Koelpinia deflexa Stschegl. - Central Asia
- Koelpinia linearis Pall. - from Morocco to Xinjiang
- Koelpinia macrantha C.Winkl. - Iran, Afghanistan, Central Asia
- Koelpinia sessilis Boiss. - Iran
- Koelpinia tenuissima Pavlov & Lipsch. - Iran, Afghanistan, Pakistan, Central Asia
- Koelpinia turanica Vassilcz. - Central Asia
