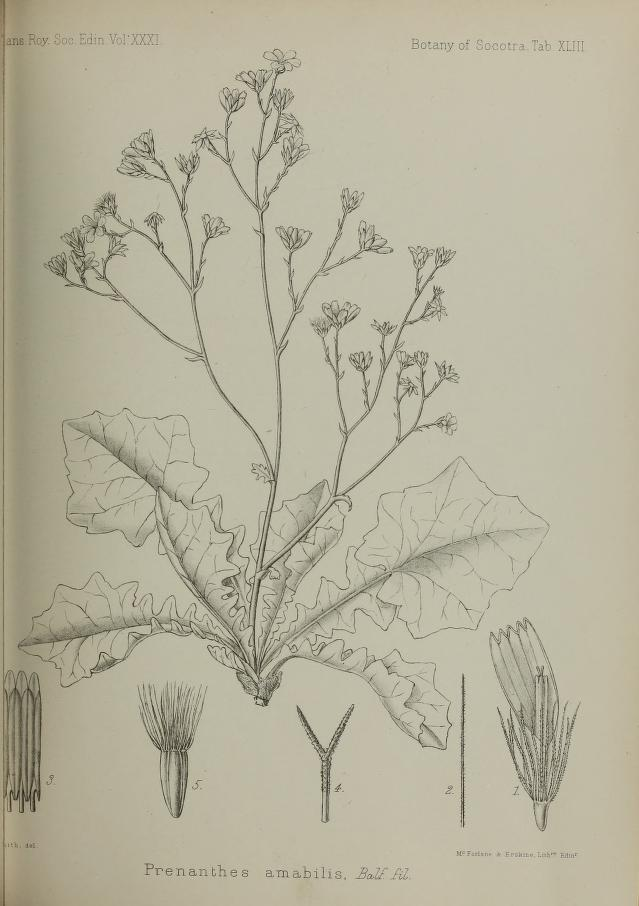

Conservation status
- Endangered (IUCN 3.1)

Scientific classification
- Kingdom: Plantae
- Clade: Tracheophytes
- Clade: Angiosperms
- Clade: Eudicots
- Clade: Asterids
- Order: Asterales
- Family: Asteraceae
- Genus: Erythroseris
- Species: E. amabilis

Binomial name
- Erythroseris amabilis (Balf.f.) N.Kilian & Gemeinholzer

Synonyms
- Prenanthes amabilis Balf.f.

= Erythroseris amabilis =

Species of plant

Erythroseris amabilis is a species of flowering plant in the family Asteraceae. It is found only in the Socotra Islands, part of the Republic of Yemen. Its natural habitats are subtropical or tropical dry forests and rocky areas. It is listed as an endangered species by the IUCN under the basionym Prenanthes amabilis.
