= Heteroderis =

Scientific classification
- Kingdom: Plantae
- Clade: Tracheophytes
- Clade: Angiosperms
- Clade: Eudicots
- Clade: Asterids
- Order: Asterales
- Family: Asteraceae
- Subfamily: Cichorioideae
- Tribe: Cichorieae
- Subtribe: Crepidinae
- Genus: Heteroderis (Bunge) Boiss.
- Species: H. pusilla

Binomial name
- Heteroderis pusilla (Boiss.) Boiss.

Synonyms
- Barkhausia sect. Heteroderis Bunge; Chondrilla pusilla Boiss.; Heteroderis pusilla var. chaetocephala (Bunge) Bornm.; Heteroderis pusilla var. leucocephala (Bunge) Rech.f.; Heteroderis leucocephala (Bunge) Leonova; Barkhausia chaetocephala Bunge; Heteroderis stocksiana Boiss.; Crepis stocksiana (Boiss.) Aitch. & Hemsl.; Crepis aegyptiaca (Schweinf.) Täckh. & Boulos; Heteroderis pusilla var. khorassanica Nasseh; Heteroderis pusilla var. gymnocephala Rech.f.; Barkhausia melanocephala Bunge; Heteroderis aegyptiaca Schweinf. ex Schweinf.; Barkhausia leucocephala Bunge

Genus of flowering plants

Heteroderis is a genus of flowering plants in the family Asteraceae.

Species

There is only one known species, Heteroderis pusilla, native to Egypt, Saudi Arabia, Iraq, Iran, Afghanistan, Pakistan, Turkmenistan, Kyrgyzstan, Uzbekistan, Tajikistan, and Kazakhstan.
