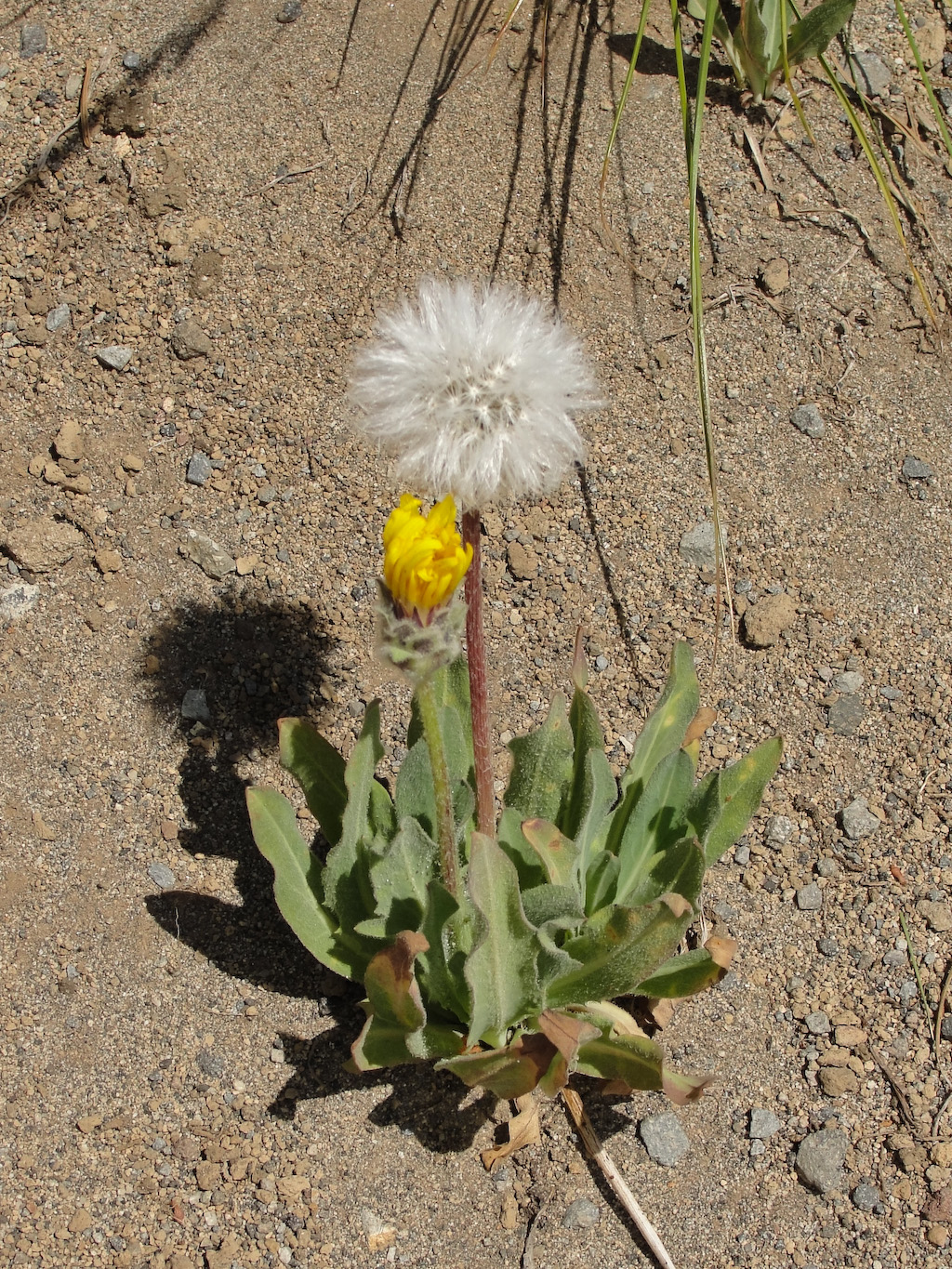
- Agoseris monticola

Scientific classification
- Kingdom: Plantae
- Clade: Tracheophytes
- Clade: Angiosperms
- Clade: Eudicots
- Clade: Asterids
- Order: Asterales
- Family: Asteraceae
- Tribe: Cichorieae
- Subtribe: Microseridinae; Stebbins

Genera
- See text

= Microseridinae =

Subtribe of flowering plants

Microseridinae is a subtribe of Cichorieae in the sunflower family Asteraceae.

Microseridinae genera recognized by the Global Compositae Database as of June 2022:

- Agoseris
- Anisocoma
- Atrichoseris
- Calycoseris
- Chaetadelpha
- Glyptopleura
- Krigia
- Lygodesmia
- Malacothrix
- Marshalljohnstonia
- Microseris
- Munzothamnus
- Nothocalais
- Picrosia
- Pinaropappus
- Pleiacanthus
- Prenanthella
- Pyrrhopappus
- Rafinesquia
- Shinnersoseris
- Stephanomeria
- Uropappus
