= Phitosia =

Conservation status
- Endangered (IUCN 3.1)

Scientific classification
- Kingdom: Plantae
- Clade: Embryophytes
- Clade: Tracheophytes
- Clade: Angiosperms
- Clade: Eudicots
- Clade: Asterids
- Order: Asterales
- Family: Asteraceae
- Subfamily: Cichorioideae
- Tribe: Cichorieae
- Subtribe: Chondrillinae
- Genus: Phitosia; Kamari & Greuter
- Species: P. crocifolia

Binomial name
- Phitosia crocifolia (Boiss. & Heldr.) Kamari & Greuter

Synonyms
- Crepis crocifolia Boiss. & Heldr.; Hieracioides crocifolium (Boiss. & Heldr.) Kuntze; Soyeria crocifolia (Boiss. & Heldr.) Sch.Bip.

Genus of flowering plants

Phitosia is a genus of Greek plants in the tribe Cichorieae within the family Asteraceae.

The only known species is Phitosia crocifolia, found only in the Taigetos Range on the Peloponnese Peninsula in Greece. It is listed as an endangered species on the International Union for Conservation of Nature's Red List under the synonymous name Crepis crocifolia.
