= Marshalljohnstonia =

Scientific classification
- Kingdom: Plantae
- Clade: Tracheophytes
- Clade: Angiosperms
- Clade: Eudicots
- Clade: Asterids
- Order: Asterales
- Family: Asteraceae
- Subfamily: Cichorioideae
- Tribe: Cichorieae
- Subtribe: Microseridinae
- Genus: Marshalljohnstonia; Henrickson
- Species: M. gypsophila

Binomial name
- Marshalljohnstonia gypsophila Henrickson

Genus of flowering plants

Marshalljohnstonia is a genus of Mexican flowering plants in the tribe Cichorieae within the family Asteraceae.

Species

There is only one known species, Marshalljohnstonia gypsophila, native to the State of Coahuila in northern Mexico.
