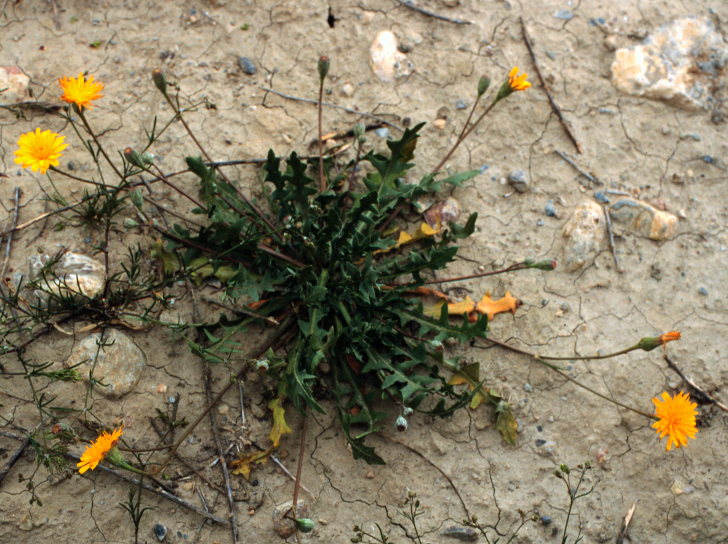
- Scorzoneroides muelleri

Scientific classification
- Kingdom: Plantae
- Clade: Tracheophytes
- Clade: Angiosperms
- Clade: Eudicots
- Clade: Asterids
- Order: Asterales
- Family: Asteraceae
- Subfamily: Cichorioideae
- Tribe: Cichorieae
- Subtribe: Hypochaeridinae
- Genus: Scorzoneroides; Moench

Synonyms
- Leontodon subgenus Oporinia; Fidelia Sch.Bip.; Kalbfussia Sch.Bip.; Oporinia D.Don; Oporina D.Don, alternate spelling; Deloderium Cass.; Millina Cass.

= Scorzoneroides =

Genus of plants

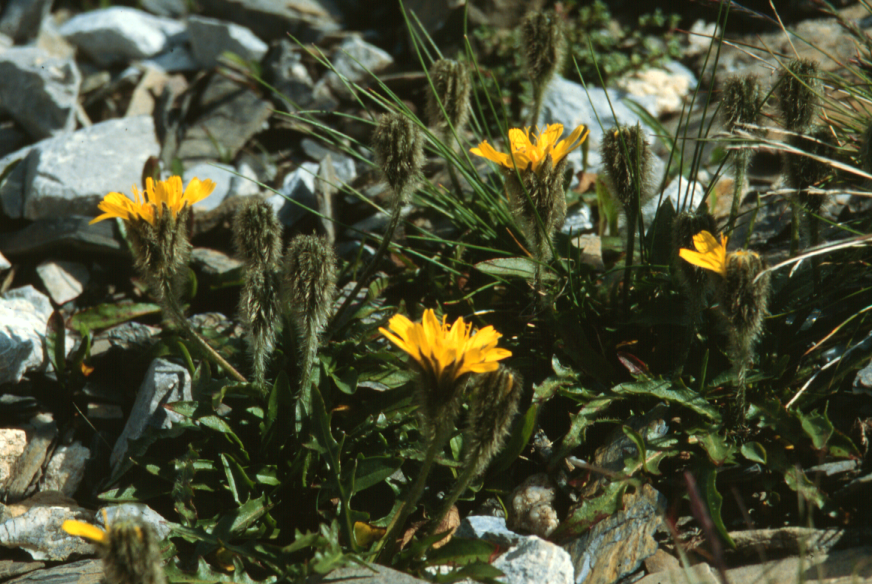
Scorzoneroides montana subsp. montana

Scorzoneroides or hawkbits is a genus of plants of the tribe Cichorieae within the family Asteraceae.

Scorzoneroides used to be included in the genus Leontodon. Recent molecular studies revealed that Leontodon in the older, broader sense is an unnatural adhesion of two separate groupings. Therefore, the former subgenus Oporinia of the genus Leontodon had to be resurrected as a separate genus.

== Secondary metabolites ==
In some members of the genus Scorzoneroides, germacranolides and costus lactone-type guaianolides were detected. The genus is a rich source of hieracin-type and lactucin-type guaianolides.

Phenolics found in flowering heads of Scorzoneroides taxa include luteolin type flavonoids and caffeoyl quinic acid derivatives such as chlorogenic acid and 3,5-dicaffeoylquinic acid. Moreover, Scorzoneroides are source species of caffeoyl tartaric acid derivatives caffeoyl tartaric acid and cichoric acid.

== Species ==
accepted species

- Scorzoneroides atlantica - Morocco
- Scorzoneroides autumnalis - Europe, Morocco, Russia, Kazakhstan, Caucasus; introduced in North America
- Scorzoneroides cantabrica - Spain, Portugal
- Scorzoneroides carpetana - Spain
- Scorzoneroides cichoracea - Mediterranean
- Scorzoneroides crocea - Italy, Austria, Romania, Ukraine, Crimea
- Scorzoneroides duboisii - Spain, France
- Scorzoneroides garnironii - Morocco
- Scorzoneroides helvetica - France, Germany, Austria, Switzerland, Slovenia, Italy
- Scorzoneroides hispidula - Mediterranean
- Scorzoneroides keretina - Ukraine, Finland
- Scorzoneroides kralikii - Tunisia. Libya
- Scorzoneroides laciniata - from Egypt to Iran
- Scorzoneroides microcephala - Spain
- Scorzoneroides montana - from Germany to Montenegro
- Scorzoneroides montaniformis - Austria, Italy, Albania
- Scorzoneroides muelleri - western Mediterranean
- Scorzoneroides nevadensis - Spain
- Scorzoneroides oraria - Morocco, Libya
- Scorzoneroides palisiae - Morocco, Canary Islands, Spain
- Scorzoneroides pseudotaraxaci - Poland, Slovakia, Romania, Ukraine, Crimea
- Scorzoneroides pyrenaica - Spain, France
- Scorzoneroides rilaensis - Bulgaria, Romania, Serbia
- Scorzoneroides salzmannii - Morocco, Canary Islands
- Scorzoneroides simplex - Egypt, Libya
