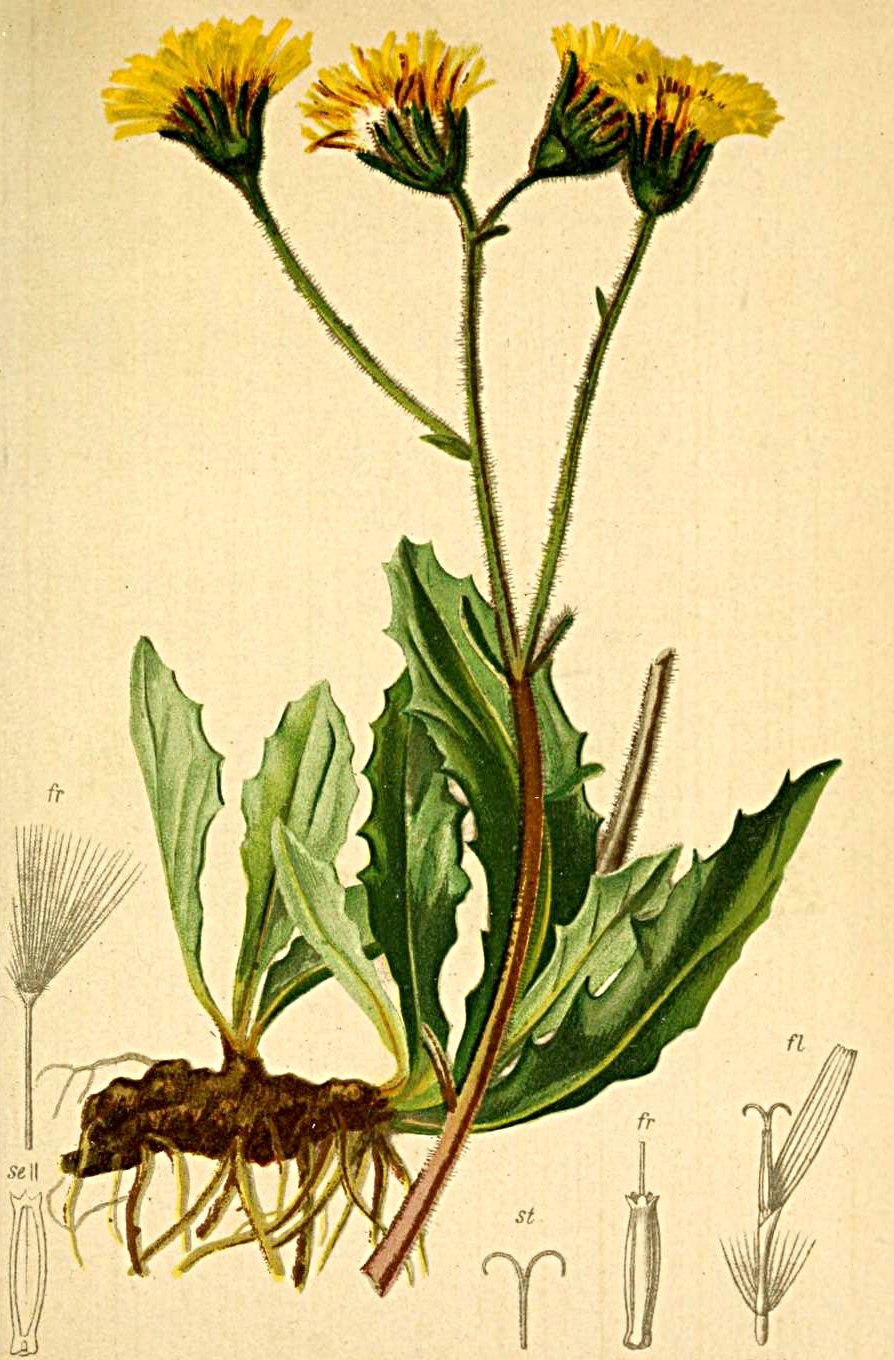
- Willemetia stipitata
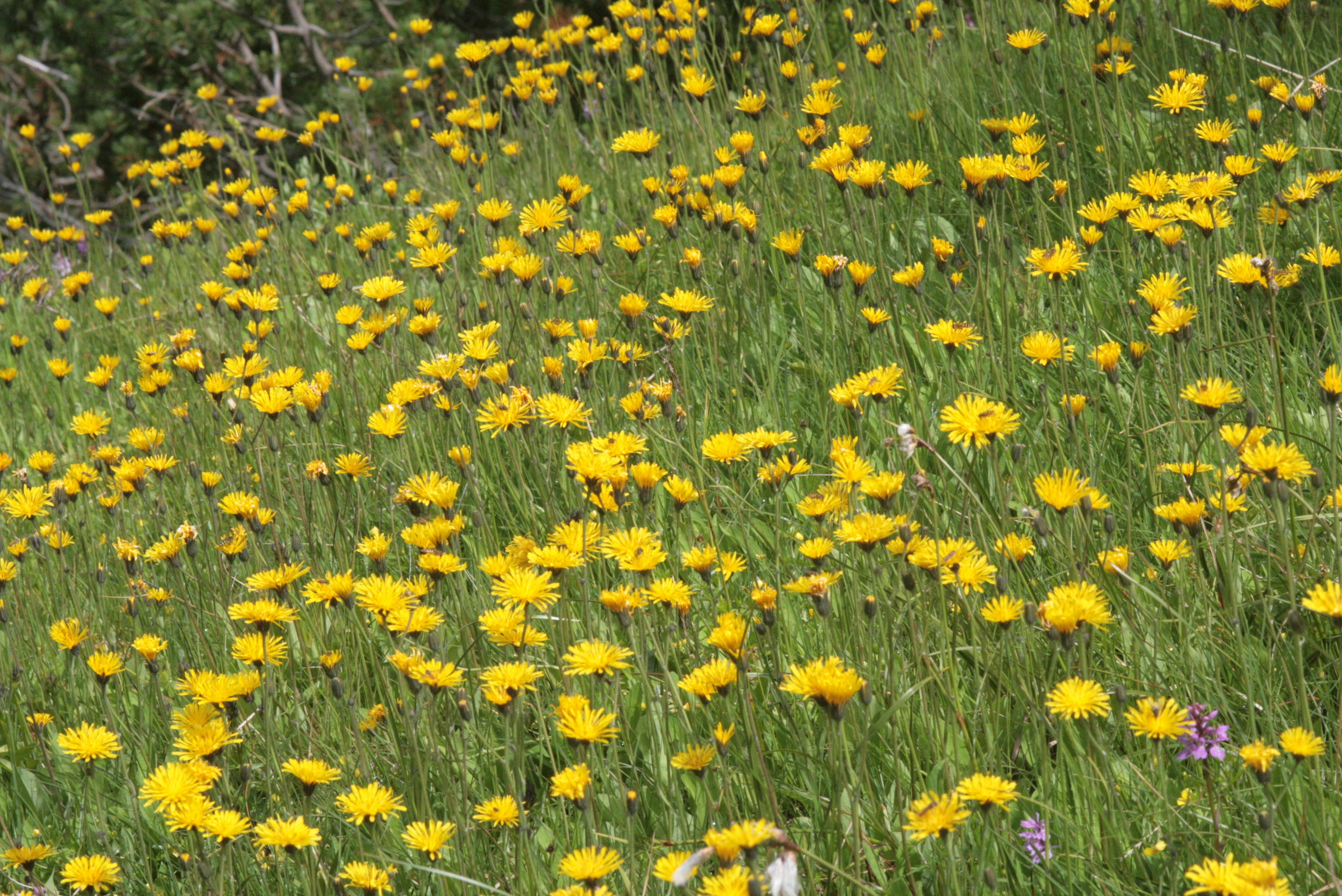
- Willemetia stipitata

Scientific classification
- Kingdom: Plantae
- Clade: Tracheophytes
- Clade: Angiosperms
- Clade: Eudicots
- Clade: Asterids
- Order: Asterales
- Family: Asteraceae
- Subfamily: Cichorioideae
- Tribe: Cichorieae
- Subtribe: Chondrillinae
- Genus: Willemetia; Neck. ex Neck. 1777 not Maerkl. 1801 (Amaranthaceae) nor Brongn. 1827 (Rhamnaceae) nor Necker ex Cassini 1827

Type species
- Willemetia hieracioides Neck.

Synonyms
- Calycocorsus F.W.Schmidt

= Willemetia =

Genus of flowering plants

Willemetia is a genus of flowering plants in the family Asteraceae. It is native to Europe, Iran and the Caucasus.

Species

- Willemetia stipitata (Jacq.) Dalla Torre - Central Europe (France, Germany, Italy, Serbia, etc.)
- Willemetia tuberosa Fisch. & C.A.Mey. ex DC. - Iran, Caucasus
