= Lasiospora =

Scientific classification
- Kingdom: Plantae
- Clade: Tracheophytes
- Clade: Angiosperms
- Clade: Eudicots
- Clade: Asterids
- Order: Asterales
- Family: Asteraceae
- Subfamily: Cichorioideae
- Tribe: Cichorieae
- Subtribe: Scorzonerinae
- Genus: Lasiospora; Cass.

Genus of flowering plants

Lasiospora is a genus of plants in the family Asteraceae, native to the Mediterranean region.

Species

- Lasiospora eriolaena P.Candargy - Lesbos
- Lasiospora hirsuta (Gouan) Cass. - France, Italy, Spain, Croatia
