= Munzothamnus =

Conservation status
- Imperiled (NatureServe)

Scientific classification
- Kingdom: Plantae
- Clade: Tracheophytes
- Clade: Angiosperms
- Clade: Eudicots
- Clade: Asterids
- Order: Asterales
- Family: Asteraceae
- Subfamily: Cichorioideae
- Tribe: Cichorieae
- Subtribe: Microseridinae
- Genus: Munzothamnus; P.H.Raven
- Species: M. blairii

Binomial name
- Munzothamnus blairii (Munz & I.M.Johnst.) P.H.Raven

Synonyms
- Malacothrix blairii Stephanomeria blairii

Genus of flowering plants

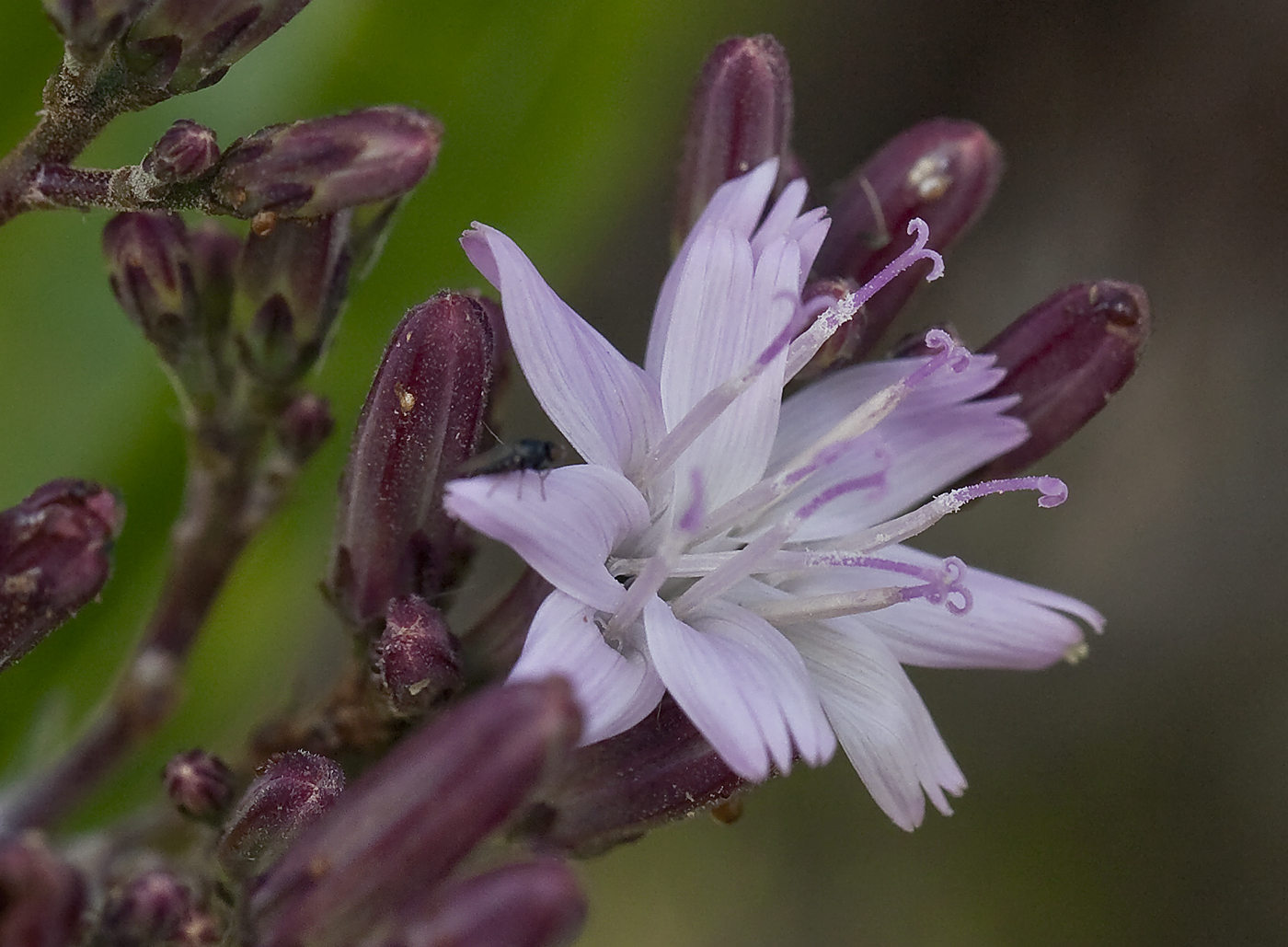
Munzothamnus blairii (Blair's wirelettuce).

Munzothamnus is a monotypic genus of flowering plants in the family Asteraceae containing the single species Munzothamnus blairii, which is known by the common name Blair's wirelettuce, or Blair's munzothamnus. It is endemic to San Clemente Island, one of the Channel Islands of California. It grows along steep, rocky cliffsides and canyons on the island. It is a shrub producing a fleshy, woolly stem usually over a meter in height, often approaching two meters. Leaves occur in tufts at the ends of the stem branches. They are up to 15 centimeters long, oblong in shape, and sometimes very shallowly lobed. They are woolly when new but lose their hairs and become shiny green with age. The inflorescence is a large array of up to 35 flower heads. Each head has a cylindrical base under a centimetre long and contains 9 to 12 light lavender or pinkish flowers. Each flower is a ray floret with an erect tube and a strap-shaped ligule with a toothed tip. The ligule is just under a centimetre long. The fruit is a cylindrical, ribbed achene with a white pappus.

Like many Channel Islands endemics, this plant was reduced to rarity by the presence of feral goats on the islands; the goats have been removed.

The Latin name of Munzothamnus refers to the American botanist Philip A. Munz.
