= Tourneuxia =

Scientific classification
- Kingdom: Plantae
- Clade: Tracheophytes
- Clade: Angiosperms
- Clade: Eudicots
- Clade: Asterids
- Order: Asterales
- Family: Asteraceae
- Subfamily: Cichorioideae
- Tribe: Cichorieae
- Subtribe: Scorzonerinae
- Genus: Tourneuxia; E.Coss.
- Species: T. variifolia

Binomial name
- Tourneuxia variifolia E.Coss.

Synonyms
- Tourneuxia variifolia var. bellidifolia Sauvage

Genus of plants

Tourneuxia is a genus of flowering plants in the tribe Cichorieae within the family Asteraceae.

Species

The only known species is Tourneuxia variifolia, native to North Africa (Morocco, Algeria, Tunisia, Libya).
