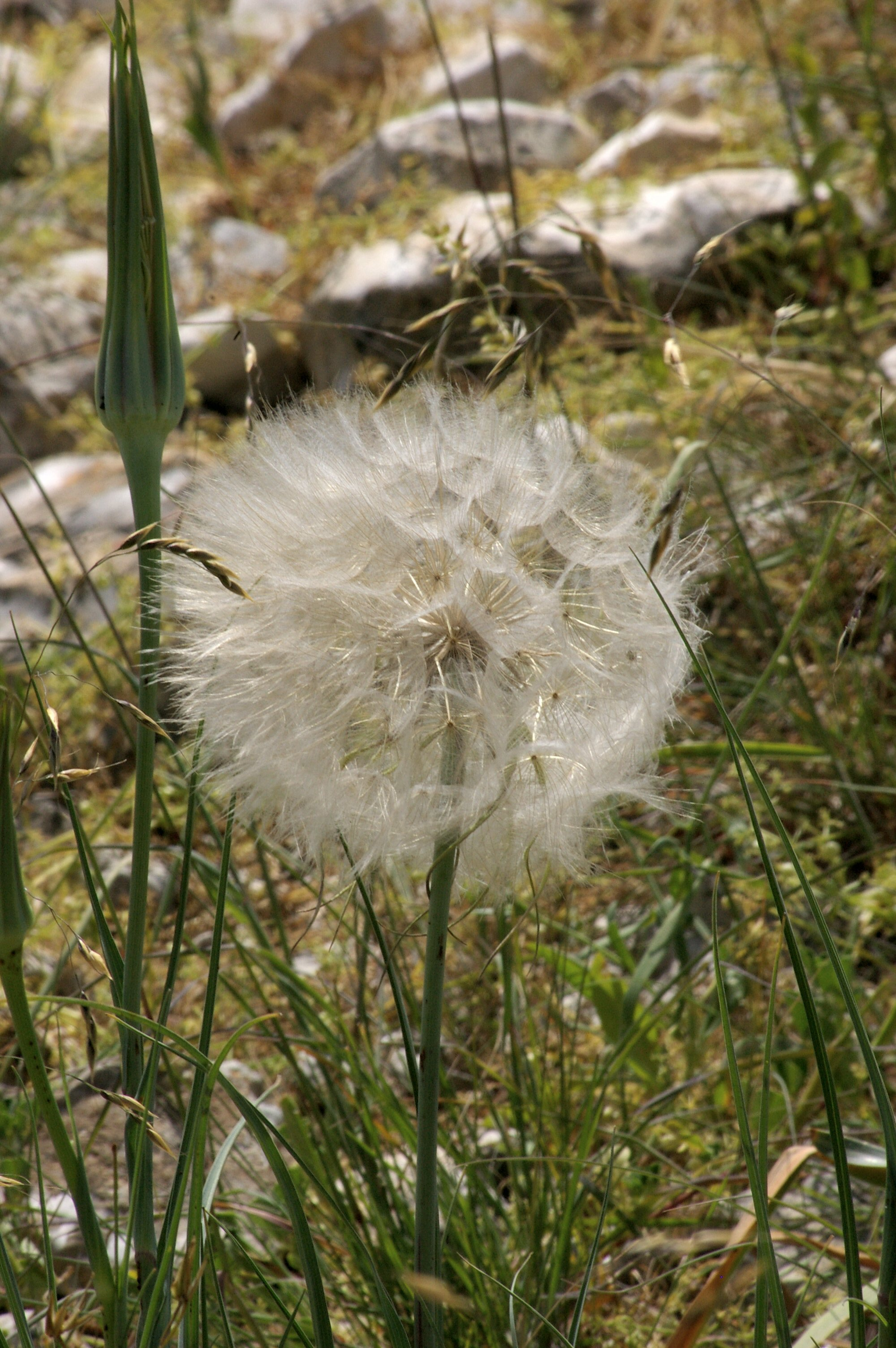

Scientific classification
- Kingdom: Plantae
- Clade: Embryophytes
- Clade: Tracheophytes
- Clade: Angiosperms
- Clade: Eudicots
- Clade: Asterids
- Order: Asterales
- Family: Asteraceae
- Subfamily: Cichorioideae
- Tribe: Cichorieae
- Subtribe: Scorzonerinae
- Genus: Geropogon; L.
- Species: G. hybridus

Binomial name
- Geropogon hybridus (L. Sch.Bip.

Synonyms
- Tragopogon hybridus L.; Tragopogon glaber (L.) Hill; Tragopogon glaber (L.) DC.; Geropogon australe Spreng.; Geropogon glabrum L.; Geropogon hirsutum L.; Geropogon hirsutus L.; Geropogon australis Spreng.; Tragopogon hirsutus (L.) Hill; Geropogon glaber L.; Tragopogon geropogon Rouy

= Geropogon =

Genus of plants

Geropogon is a genus of flowering plants in the family Asteraceae.

== Species ==
Several species names have been published in the genus, but only one is recognized. Geropogon hybridus, the pasture goatsbeard or slender salsify, is native to the Mediterranean and adjacent areas, from the Canary Islands to Iran.
