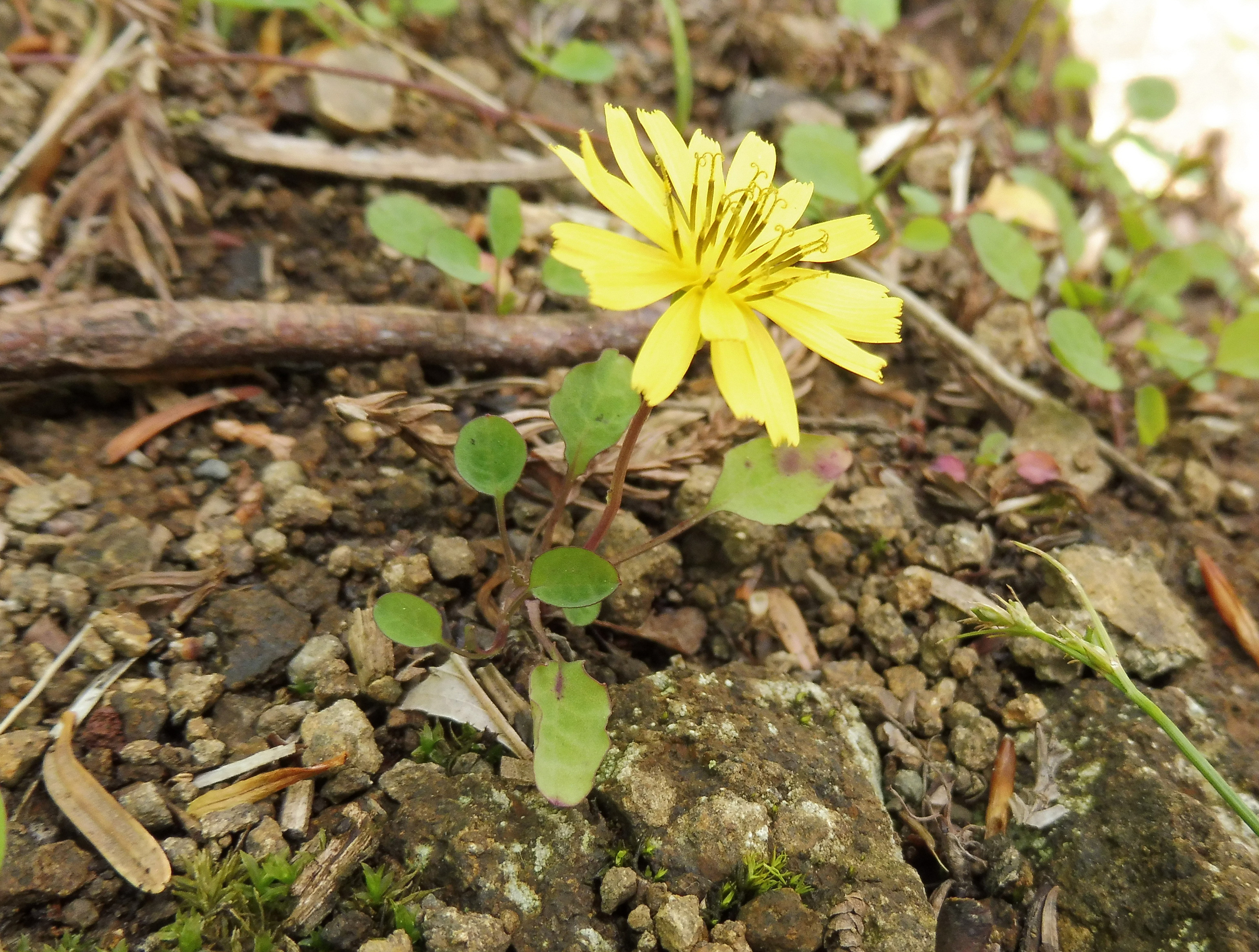

Scientific classification
- Kingdom: Plantae
- Clade: Tracheophytes
- Clade: Angiosperms
- Clade: Eudicots
- Clade: Asterids
- Order: Asterales
- Family: Asteraceae
- Genus: Ixeris
- Species: I. stolonifera

Binomial name
- Ixeris stolonifera A.Gray

= Ixeris stolonifera =

Species of flowering plant

Ixeris stolonifera, commonly called creeping lettuce, is a species of flowering plant in the family Asteraceae. It is native to east Asia, where it is found in China, Japan, and Korea. It is a common and widespread species in Japan.

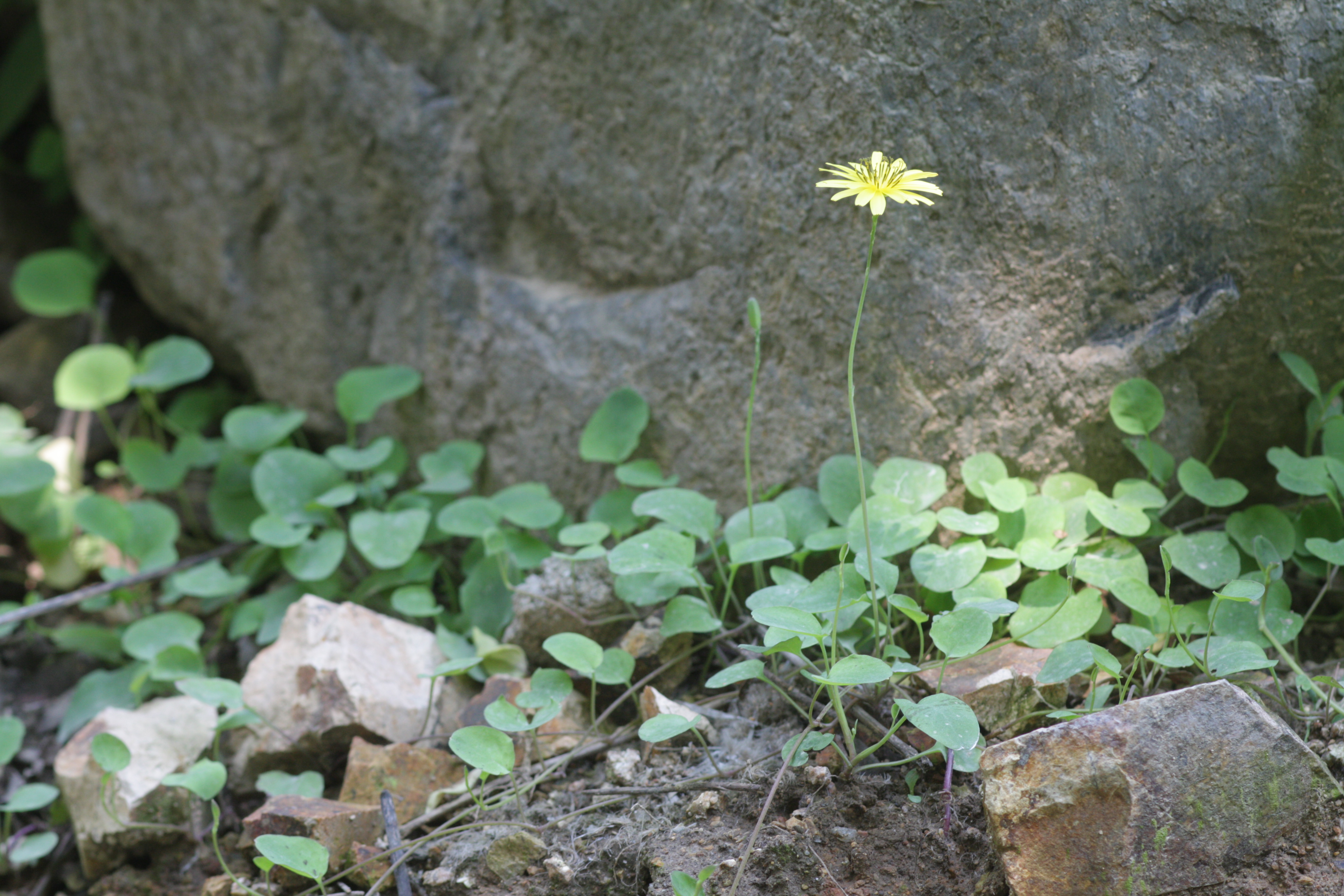
Ixeris stolonifera

Its natural habitat is on open mountain slopes, often is rocky areas with shallow soil. However, it is also found in disturbed areas such as cultivated fields and abandoned ground. It has naturalized locally in the northeastern United States.

Ixeris stolonifera is a low, stoloniferous perennial, with flowering scapes growing to approximately 15 cm (5.9 in) tall. It produces yellow heads of flowers in spring. It can be confused with the similar-looking Ixeris japonica, but I. stolonifera is distinguished by its smaller inflorescences, smaller fruits, and more ovate-orbicular leaves.
