= Phalacroseris =

Scientific classification
- Kingdom: Plantae
- Clade: Tracheophytes
- Clade: Angiosperms
- Clade: Eudicots
- Clade: Asterids
- Order: Asterales
- Family: Asteraceae
- Subfamily: Cichorioideae
- Tribe: Cichorieae
- Subtribe: Cichoriinae
- Genus: Phalacroseris; A.Gray
- Species: P. bolanderi

Binomial name
- Phalacroseris bolanderi A.Gray

Genus of flowering plants

Phalacroseris is a monotypic genus of flowering plants in the family Asteraceae containing the single species Phalacroseris bolanderi, which is known by the common name Bolander's mock dandelion.

== Description ==
Phalacroseris is a perennial herb with fleshy herbage growing from a woody caudex. The leaves are located around the base of the plant, growing up to 20 centimeters long and linear to somewhat lance-shaped. The inflorescence reaches up to 35 centimeters tall and is topped with a head filled with many golden ray florets. There are no disc florets. The fruit is a hairless, speckled, four-angled achene about 3 millimeters long. There is usually no pappus, but some achenes have vestigial pappus structures on their flat tops.

== Distribution ==
It is endemic to the Sierra Nevada of California, where it grows in wet habitat such as moist meadows, bogs, and clearings in subalpine coniferous forest.
