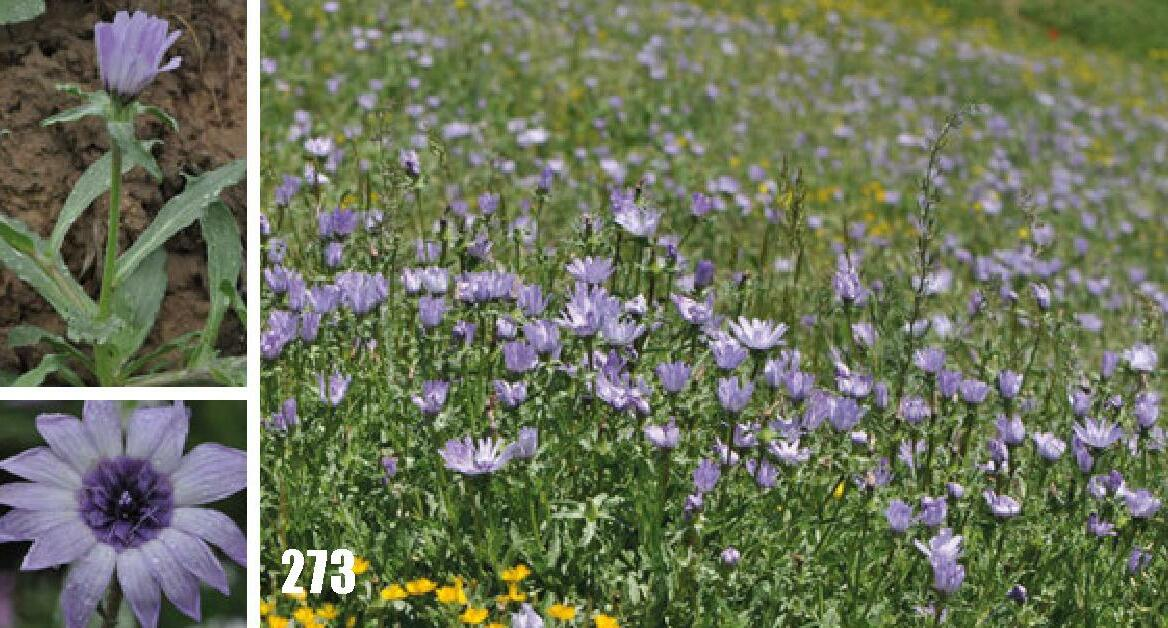
- Epilasia mirabilis

Scientific classification
- Kingdom: Plantae
- Clade: Tracheophytes
- Clade: Angiosperms
- Clade: Eudicots
- Clade: Asterids
- Order: Asterales
- Family: Asteraceae
- Subfamily: Cichorioideae
- Tribe: Cichorieae
- Subtribe: Scorzonerinae
- Genus: Epilasia (Bunge) Benth. & Hook.f.

Synonyms
- Scorzonera sect. Epilasia Bunge

= Epilasia =

Genus of flowering plants

Epilasia is a genus of flowering plants in the family Asteraceae.

Species

- Epilasia acrolasia (Bunge) Lipsch. - Xinjiang, Kazakhstan, Uzbekistan, Tajikistan, Kyrgyzstan, Turkmenistan, Pakistan, Afghanistan, Iran, Iraq, Syria, Lebanon
- Epilasia hemilasia (Bunge) C.B.Clarke - Xinjiang, Kazakhstan, Tajikistan, Kyrgyzstan, Uzbekistan, Turkmenistan, Pakistan, Afghanistan, Iran, Iraq, Armenia, Azerbaijan
- Epilasia mirabilis Lipsch. - Uzbekistan, Tajikistan, Kyrgyzstan, Turkmenistan, Afghanistan, Iran
