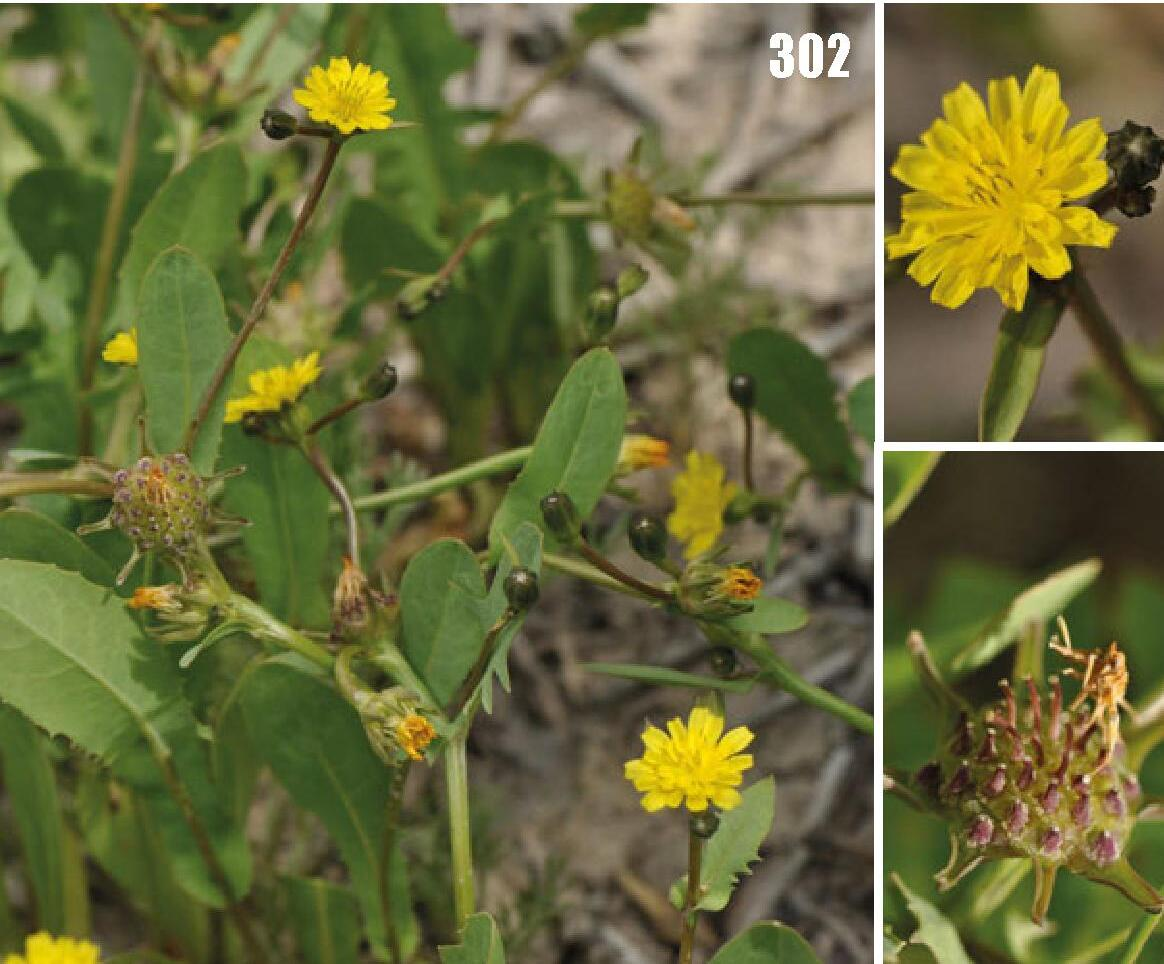

Scientific classification
- Kingdom: Plantae
- Clade: Tracheophytes
- Clade: Angiosperms
- Clade: Eudicots
- Clade: Asterids
- Order: Asterales
- Family: Asteraceae
- Subfamily: Cichorioideae
- Tribe: Cichorieae
- Subtribe: Crepidinae
- Genus: Heteracia; Fisch. & C.A. Mey.
- Species: H. szovitsii

Binomial name
- Heteracia szovitsii Fisch. & C.A. Mey.

Synonyms
- Heteracea Steud., alternate spelling; Heteracia epapposa (Regel & Schmalh.) Popov; Heteracia szovitsii var. epapposa Regel & Schmalh

= Heteracia =

Genus of flowering plants

Heteracia is a genus of flowering plants in the family Asteraceae. There is only one known species, Heteracia szovitsii, native to the Balkan Peninsula, Crimea, Caucasus, Iran, Central Asia, Afghanistan, Pakistan, and Xinjiang.
