= Pterachaenia =

Scientific classification
- Kingdom: Plantae
- Clade: Embryophytes
- Clade: Tracheophytes
- Clade: Angiosperms
- Clade: Eudicots
- Clade: Asterids
- Order: Asterales
- Family: Asteraceae
- Subfamily: Cichorioideae
- Tribe: Cichorieae
- Subtribe: Scorzonerinae
- Genus: Pterachaenia (Benth.) Lipsch.

Synonyms
- Scorzonera sect. Pterachaenia Benth. & Hook.f.

Genus of flowering plants

Pterachaenia is a genus of flowering plants in the tribe Cichorieae within the family Asteraceae.

Species

Species accepted by Plants of the World Online as of March 2024:

- Pterachaenia codringtonii (Rech.f.) Zaika, Sukhor. & N.Kilian
- Pterachaenia stewartii (Hook.f.) R.R.Stewart

Pterachaenia stewartii is native to Afghanistan and Pakistan.
