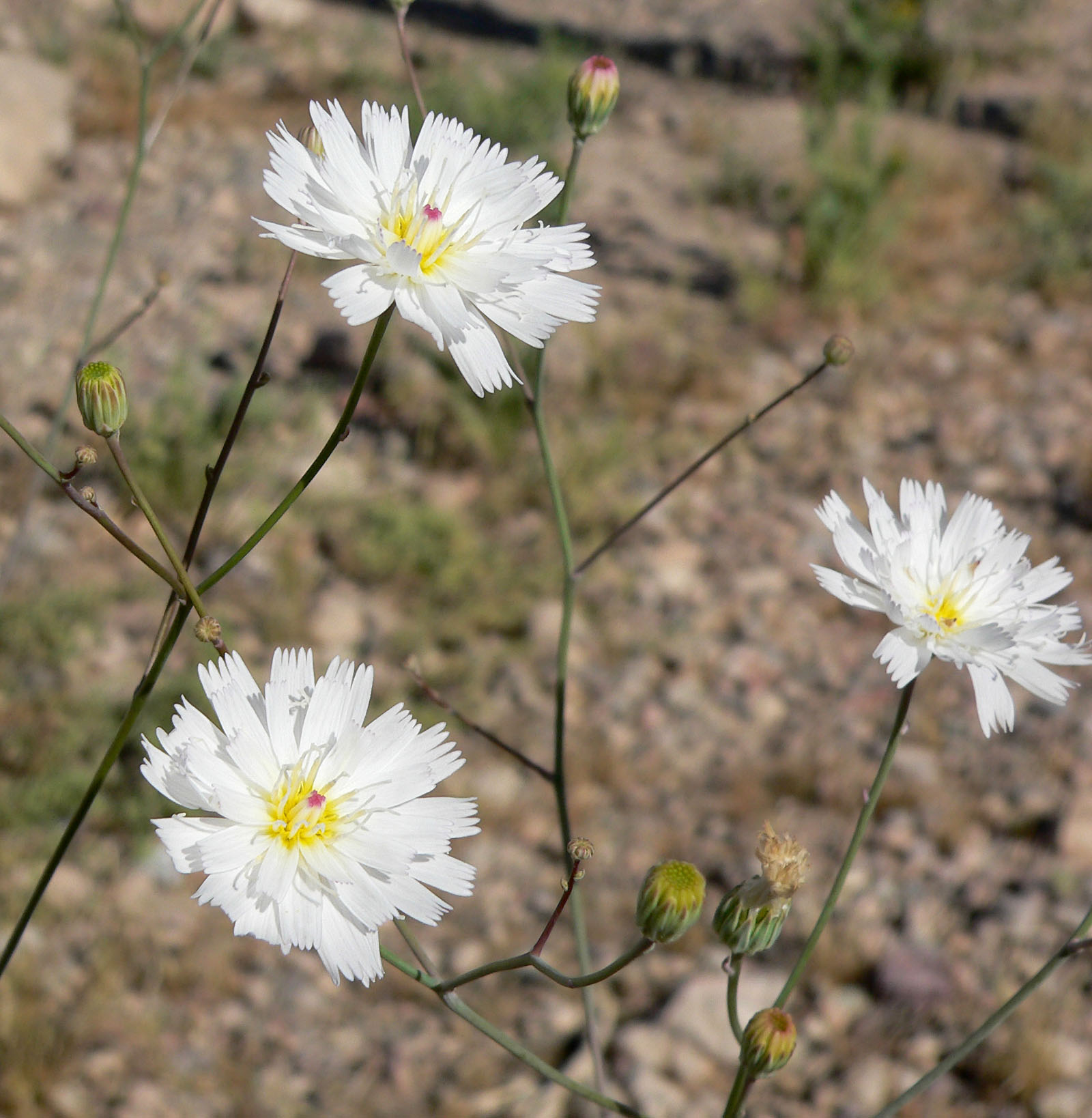
- Atrichoseris platyphylla at Lake Mead

Scientific classification
- Kingdom: Plantae
- Clade: Tracheophytes
- Clade: Angiosperms
- Clade: Eudicots
- Clade: Asterids
- Order: Asterales
- Family: Asteraceae
- Subfamily: Cichorioideae
- Tribe: Cichorieae
- Subtribe: Microseridinae
- Genus: Atrichoseris; A.Gray
- Species: A. platyphylla

Binomial name
- Atrichoseris platyphylla A. Gray

Synonyms
- Anathrix A.Gray; Malacothrix unranked Anathrix A. Gray; Malacothrix platyphylla A.Gray

= Atrichoseris =

Genus of flowering plants

Atrichoseris is a genus of plants in the family Asteraceae. It contains only one known species, Atrichoseris platyphylla, known by the common names tobacco weed, parachute plant, and gravel ghost.

A. platyphylla is native to the deserts of the southwestern United States (southern California, Arizona, Nevada and the southwestern corner of Utah) and northwestern Mexico (Sonora, Baja California).

The plant produces a low basal rosette of rounded leaves patterned with gray-green and purple patches at ground level. It sends up a weedy-looking thin branching stem up to 70 centimetres (28 inches) tall, topped with a number of attractive, fragrant white or pink-tinged flowers, about 2.5–5 cm (1–2 in) wide, the layered ray florets rectangular and toothed. The flowers bloom between February and May. The hairless fruit has the shape of a five-sided club.

The genus name, Atrichoseris, means 'chicory plant without hairs', referring to the fruit, and the specific epithet, platyphylla, means 'flat-leaved'.

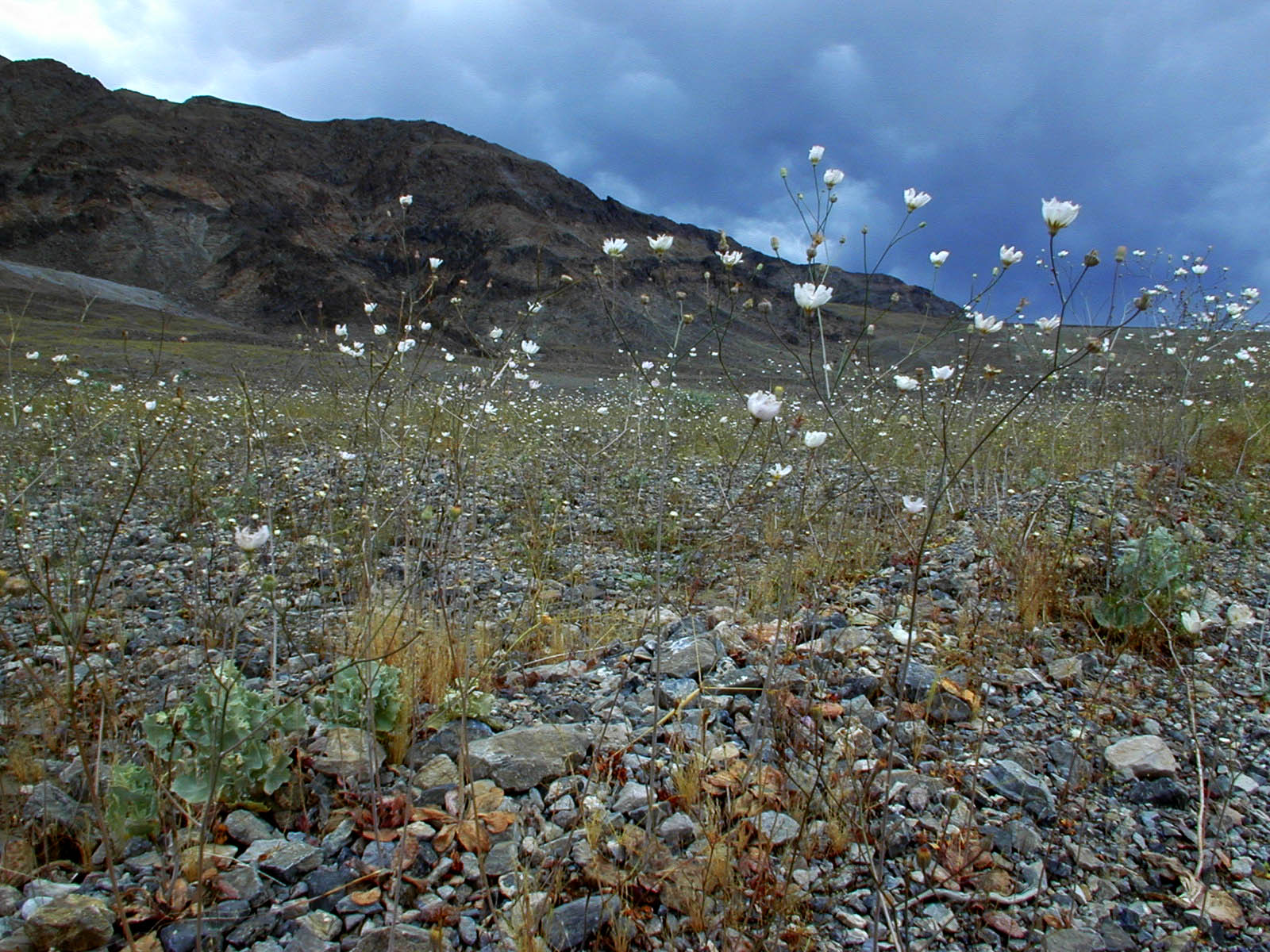
Gravel ghosts in Death Valley National Park, March 2005.
