= Erythroseris =

Scientific classification
- Kingdom: Plantae
- Clade: Tracheophytes
- Clade: Angiosperms
- Clade: Eudicots
- Clade: Asterids
- Order: Asterales
- Family: Asteraceae
- Subfamily: Cichorioideae
- Tribe: Cichorieae
- Subtribe: Cichoriinae
- Genus: Erythroseris; N.Kilian & Gemeinholzer

Genus of flowering plants

Erythroseris is a genus of African plants in the tribe Cichorieae within the family Asteraceae.

Species

- Erythroseris amabilis (Balf.f.) N.Kilian & Gemeinholzer - Socotra (part of Yemen)
- Erythroseris somalensis (R.E.Fr.) N.Kilian & Gemeinholzer - Somalia
