= Faberia =

Scientific classification
- Kingdom: Plantae
- Clade: Tracheophytes
- Clade: Angiosperms
- Clade: Eudicots
- Clade: Asterids
- Order: Asterales
- Family: Asteraceae
- Subfamily: Cichorioideae
- Tribe: Cichorieae
- Subtribe: Crepidinae
- Genus: Faberia; Hemsl.

Type species
- Faberia sinensis Hemsl.

Synonyms
- Faberiopsis C.Shih & Y.L.Chen

Genus of flowering plants

Faberia is a genus of Chinese flowering plants in the family Asteraceae.

The genus is named for Ernst Faber, a German missionary who collected many plant specimens in China.

Species

- Faberia cavaleriei H.Lév.
- Faberia ceterach Beauverd
- Faberia faberi (Hemsley) N. Kilian, Z. H. Wang & J. W. Zhang
- Faberia lancifolia J.Anthony
- Faberia nanchuanensis C.Shih
- Faberia sinensis Hemsl.
- Faberia thibetica (Franch.) Beauverd
