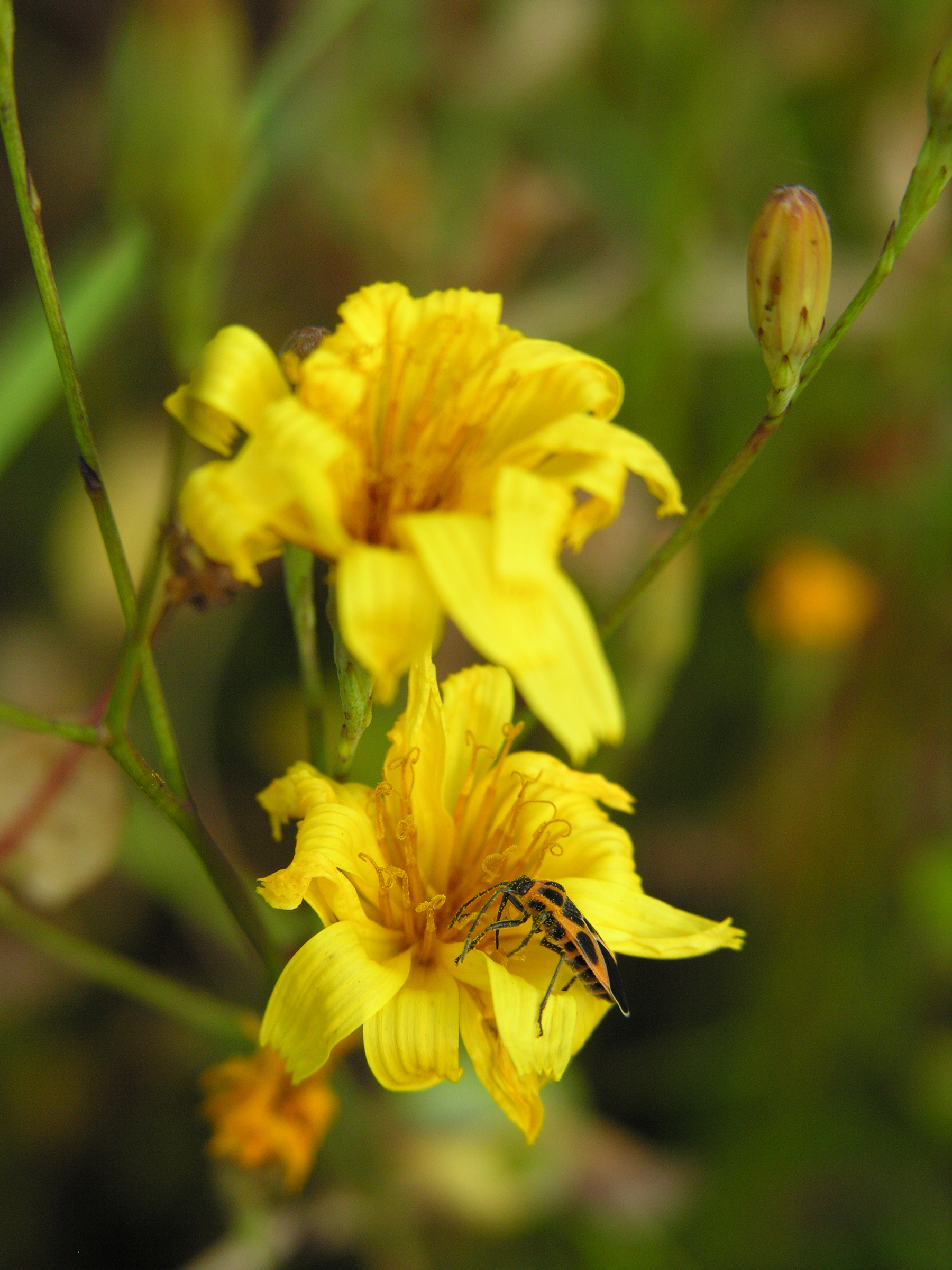
- Hololeion krameri

Scientific classification
- Kingdom: Plantae
- Clade: Embryophytes
- Clade: Tracheophytes
- Clade: Angiosperms
- Clade: Eudicots
- Clade: Asterids
- Order: Asterales
- Family: Asteraceae
- Subfamily: Cichorioideae
- Tribe: Cichorieae
- Subtribe: Crepidinae
- Genus: Hololeion; Kitam.

= Hololeion =

Genus of flowering plants

Hololeion is a genus of East Asian flowering plants in the family Asteraceae. It is native to Japan, Korea, China, and the Russian Far East.

Species

- Hololeion fauriei (H.Lév. & Vaniot) Kitam. - South Korea
- Hololeion krameri Kitam. - Honshu, Kyushu
- Hololeion maximowiczii Kitam. - Korea, Kyushu, Amur, Khabarovsk, Primorye, Heilongjiang, Jiangsu, Jilin, Liaoning, Inner Mongolia, Zhejiang
