= Notoseris =

Scientific classification
- Kingdom: Plantae
- Clade: Tracheophytes
- Clade: Angiosperms
- Clade: Eudicots
- Clade: Asterids
- Order: Asterales
- Family: Asteraceae
- Subfamily: Cichorioideae
- Tribe: Cichorieae
- Subtribe: Lactucinae
- Genus: Notoseris; C.Shih

Type species
- Notoseris psilolepis C.Shih

Genus of flowering plants

Notoseris is a genus of Asian flowering plants in the tribe Cichorieae within the family Asteraceae. The plants are native to Asia, primarily China.

Species

- Notoseris dolichophylla C.Shih
- Notoseris guizhouensis C.Shih
- Notoseris khasiana (C.B. Clarke) N. Kilian
- Notoseris macilenta (Vaniot & H. Lév.) N. Kilian
- Notoseris melanantha (Franch.) C.Shih
- Notoseris nanchuanensis C.Shih
- Notoseris porphyrolepis C.Shih
- Notoseris psilolepis C.Shih
- Notoseris triflora (Hemsl.) C.Shih
- Notoseris wilsonii C.Shih
- Notoseris yakoensis (Jeffrey) N. Kilian
- Notoseris yunnanensis C.Shih
