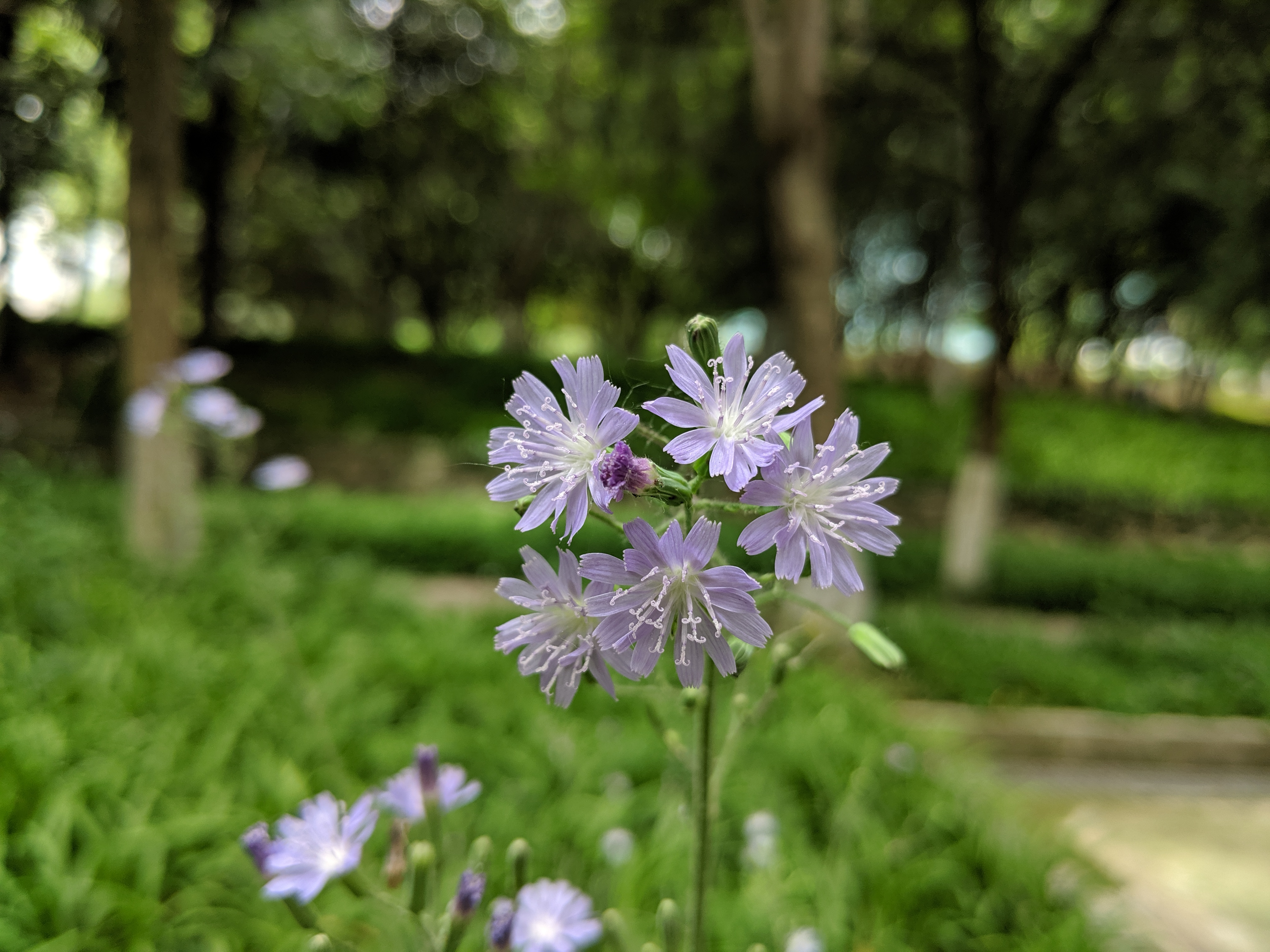
- Paraprenanthes meridionalis

Scientific classification
- Kingdom: Plantae
- Clade: Tracheophytes
- Clade: Angiosperms
- Clade: Eudicots
- Clade: Asterids
- Order: Asterales
- Family: Asteraceae
- Subfamily: Cichorioideae
- Tribe: Cichorieae
- Subtribe: Lactucinae
- Genus: Paraprenanthes; C.C.Chang ex C.Shih

Type species
- Paraprenanthes sororia (Miquel) C.Shih

= Paraprenanthes =

Genus of flowering plants

Paraprenanthes is a genus of East Asian plants in the tribe Cichorieae within the family Asteraceae, most of the species found only in China.

Species

- Paraprenanthes alatipes (Collett & Hemsl.) Zhen Wei & S.X.Zhu
- Paraprenanthes diversifolia (Vaniot) N.Kilian
- Paraprenanthes melanantha (Franch.) Ze H.Wang
- Paraprenanthes meridionalis (C.Shih) Sennikov
- Paraprenanthes nanhutashanensis S.S.Ying
- Paraprenanthes oligolepis (C.C.Chang ex C.Shih) Ze H.Wang
- Paraprenanthes prenanthoides (Hemsl.) C.Shih
- Paraprenanthes shaolinchiensis S.S.Ying
- Paraprenanthes sororia (Miq.) C.Shih
- Paraprenanthes triflora (C.C.Chang & C.Shih) Ze H.Wang & N.Kilian
- Paraprenanthes umbrosa (Dunn) Sennikov
- Paraprenanthes wilsonii (C.C.Chang) Ze H.Wang
- Paraprenanthes yangtoushanensis S.S.Ying
- Paraprenanthes yunnanensis (Franch.) C.Shih
