= Henri Cassini =

French botanist (1781–1832)

Vicompte Alexandre Henri Gabriel de Cassini
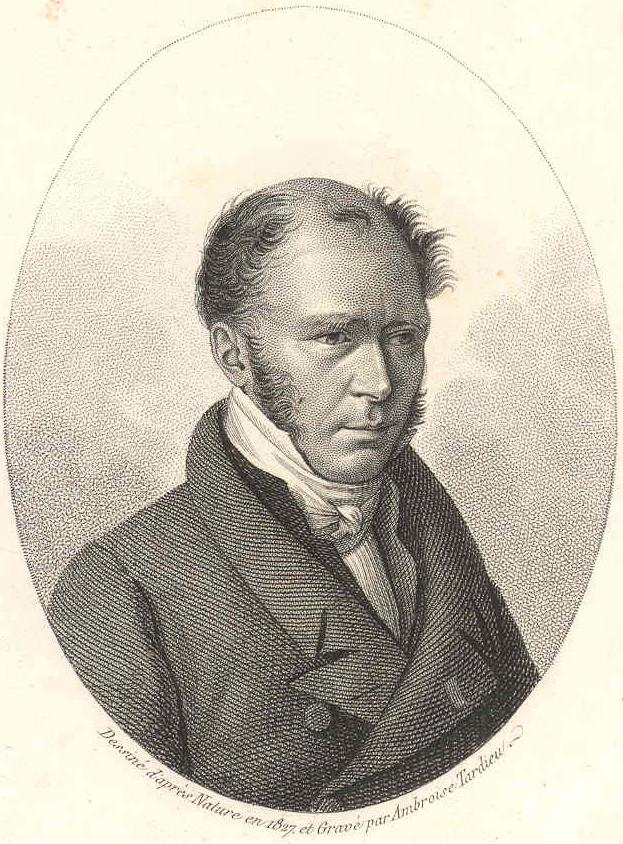
- Portrait by Ambroise Tardieu, 1827
- Born: 9 May 1781; Paris
- Died: 23 April 1832 (aged 50); Paris
- Known for: Taxonomy of the sunflower family Asteraceae
- Father: Jacques Dominique, Comte de Cassini
- Scientific career
- Fields: Botany, Naturalist
- Author abbrev. (botany): Cass.

Viscount Alexandre Henri Gabriel (vicomte) de Cassini (9 May 1781 – 23 April 1832) was a French botanist and naturalist, who specialised in the sunflower family (Asteraceae) (then known as family Compositae).

He was the youngest of five children of Jean-Dominique, Comte de Cassini (Cassini IV), famous for completing the map of France, who had succeeded his father as the director of the Paris Observatory. He was also the great-great-grandson of famous Italian-French astronomer, Giovanni Domenico Cassini, discoverer of Jupiter's Great Red Spot and the Cassini division in Saturn's rings.

The genus Cassinia was named in his honour by the botanist Robert Brown.

He named many flowering plants and new genera in the sunflower family (Asteraceae), many of them from North America. He published 65 papers and 11 reviews in the [Nouveau] Bulletin des Sciences of the Société Philomatique de Paris between 1812 and 1821. In 1825, Cassini placed the North American taxa of Prenanthes (family Asteraceae, tribe Lactuceae) in a new genus Nabalus. In 1828 he named Dugaldia hoopesii for the Scottish naturalist Dugald Stewart (1753–1828).

The standard author abbreviation Cass. is used to indicate this person as the author when citing a botanical name.

== See also ==
- Category:Taxa named by Henri Cassini
