= A. humilis =

A. humilis may refer to:

- Abacetus humilis, a ground beetle
- Abrochia humilis, a synonym of Pseudosphex humilis, a moth found in Brazil
- Acaena humilis, a synonym of Acaena magellanica, a plant found in South America and subantarctic islands
- Acanthomyrmex humilis, an ant found in Vietnam
- Acerodon humilis, the Talaud flying fox, a bat found in Indonesia
- Acidalia humilis, a synonym of Scopula humilis, a moth found in India
- Acraea humilis, a butterfly found in Africa
- Acragas humilis, a jumping spider found in Brazil
- Acropora humilis, a coral
- Agoseris humilis, a synonym of Agoseris apargioides, a plant native to the Pacific coast of the United States
- Agrochola humilis, a moth found in Europe and Anatolia
- Agrostis humilis, a grass found in North America
- Ajugoides humilis, a plant found in Japan
  - Ajuga humilis, a synonym of Ajugoides humilis
- Albuca humilis, a plant found in Africa
- Aletes humilis, a plant found in Colorado
- Allobates humilis, the Bocono rocket frog, an amphibian found in Venezuela
- Allocasuarina humilis, dwarf sheoak, a plant found in Australia
- Aloe humilis, spider aloe, a plant found in South Africa
- Alsophila humilis, a fern found in Africa
- Amastra humilis, a land snail found in Hawaii
- Amblyseius humilis, a mite
- Amelanchier humilis, the low shadbush, a plant native to North America
- Amorpha humilis, a plant native to North America
- Anacampsis humilis, a moth found in Brazil
- Andira humilis, a tree native to Brazil
- Andrena humilis, a mining bee found in the Palearctic
- Anigozanthos humilis, a plant found in Australia
- Anolis humilis, the humble anole, a lizard found in Central America
- Antaeotricha humilis, the dotted anteotricha moth, found in North America
- Aphanostephus humilis, a synonym of Aphanostephus ramosissimus, the plains lazydaisy, a plant native to North America
- Apluda humilis, a synonym of Apluda mutica, a plant native to Asia and islands in the Indian and Pacific Oceans
- Apogon humilis or Arnoseris humilis, synonyms of Krigia cespitosa, a plant native to North America
- Araeoncus humilis, a sheet weaver found in Europe and Asia
- Archernis humilis, a moth found in India
- Arctagrostis humilis, a synonym of Dupontia fisheri, tundragrass, native to Canada, Alaska, Greenland, Svalbard, and Russia
- Arctomecon humilis, a plant found in Utah
- Ardisia humilis, a plant native to southeastern Asia
- Arnica humilis, a synonym of Arnica cordifolia, a plant native to western North America
- Aster humilis, a synonym of Doellingeria infirma, a plant native to the eastern United States
- Asterocarpa humilis, a sea squirt
- Asthenes humilis, the streak-throated canastero, a bird found in Bolivia and Peru
- Astyposanthes humilis, a synonym of Stylosanthes humilis, the Townsville stylo, a plant native to the Americas
- Asura humilis, a moth found in Asia
- Atropa humilis, a synonym of Mandragora officinarum, commonly called mandrake, a plant native to the Mediterranean region
