= Indian parsley =

Indian parsley is a common name for several plants in the family Apiaceae and may refer to:

- Aletes
- Lomatium
