= Pseudosphex aequalis =

Scientific classification
- Kingdom: Animalia
- Phylum: Arthropoda
- Class: Insecta
- Order: Lepidoptera
- Superfamily: Noctuoidea
- Family: Erebidae
- Subfamily: Arctiinae
- Genus: Pseudosphex
- Species: P. aequalis

Binomial name
- Pseudosphex aequalis (Walker, 1864)

Synonyms
- Isanthrene aequalis Walker, [1865]

Species of moth

Pseudosphex aequalis is a moth of the subfamily Arctiinae. It was described by Francis Walker in 1864. It is found in Tefé, Brazil.
