= Pseudosphex nivaca =

Scientific classification
- Domain: Eukaryota
- Kingdom: Animalia
- Phylum: Arthropoda
- Class: Insecta
- Order: Lepidoptera
- Superfamily: Noctuoidea
- Family: Erebidae
- Subfamily: Arctiinae
- Genus: Pseudosphex
- Species: P. nivaca

Binomial name
- Pseudosphex nivaca (E. D. Jones, 1914)

Synonyms
- Abrochia nivaca; Chrysostola nivaca

Species of moth

Pseudosphex nivaca is a moth of the subfamily Arctiinae. It was described by E. Dukinfield Jones in 1914. It is found in Rio Grande do Sul, Brazil.
