= Acragas erythraeus =

Scientific classification
- Kingdom: Animalia
- Phylum: Arthropoda
- Subphylum: Chelicerata
- Class: Arachnida
- Order: Araneae
- Infraorder: Araneomorphae
- Family: Salticidae
- Genus: Acragas
- Species: A. erythraeus

Binomial name
- Acragas erythraeus Simon, 1900

Species of spider

Acragas erythraeus is a species of jumping spider in the genus Acragas. The scientific name of this species was first published in 1900 by Simon. These spiders are found in Brazil.
