= Aphanostephus pilosus =

Conservation status
- Apparently Secure (NatureServe)

Scientific classification
- Kingdom: Plantae
- Clade: Tracheophytes
- Clade: Angiosperms
- Clade: Eudicots
- Clade: Asterids
- Order: Asterales
- Family: Asteraceae
- Genus: Aphanostephus
- Species: A. pilosus

Binomial name
- Aphanostephus pilosus Buckley

Synonyms
- Aphanostephus pulchellus Stevens (not validly published)

Species of flowering plant

Aphanostephus pilosus, the hairy lazydaisy, is an annual herbaceous flowering plant in the family Asteraceae. It is found in the United States (New Mexico, Oklahoma, northern Texas).

== Description ==
Aphanostephus pilosus is an annual herb that grows up to 30 cm (12 in) tall. The stem is sparsely hairy, with hairs being 0.6–2.4 mm long. The phyllary apices gradually diminish in width to a tip. Flowers contain disc florets and 13–21 ray florets. The seeds are cypselae, with apically straight hairs. The seeds contain pappi that are coroniform (broadly tubular) and ciliate.

== Distribution and habitat ==
Aphanostephus pilosus is found in the United States in Oklahoma and northern Texas. It has also been recorded in Chaves County, New Mexico.

=== Habitat ===
It grows in sand, sandy clay, open scrub oak woodlands, disturbed sites, fields, and mesquite savannas at elevations of 30–200 m (98–656 ft) above sea level.

== Conservation ==
As of December 2024, the conservation group NatureServe listed Aphanostephus pilosus as Apparently Secure (G4) worldwide. This status was last reviewed on 16 May 1989. The group has not assessed this species at the state level.

== Taxonomy ==
Aphanostephus pilosus was first named and described by Samuel Botsford Buckley in 1862 in the Proceedings of the Academy of Natural Sciences of Philadelphia journal.

=== Etymology ===
In English, this species is commonly known as the hairy lazydaisy.
