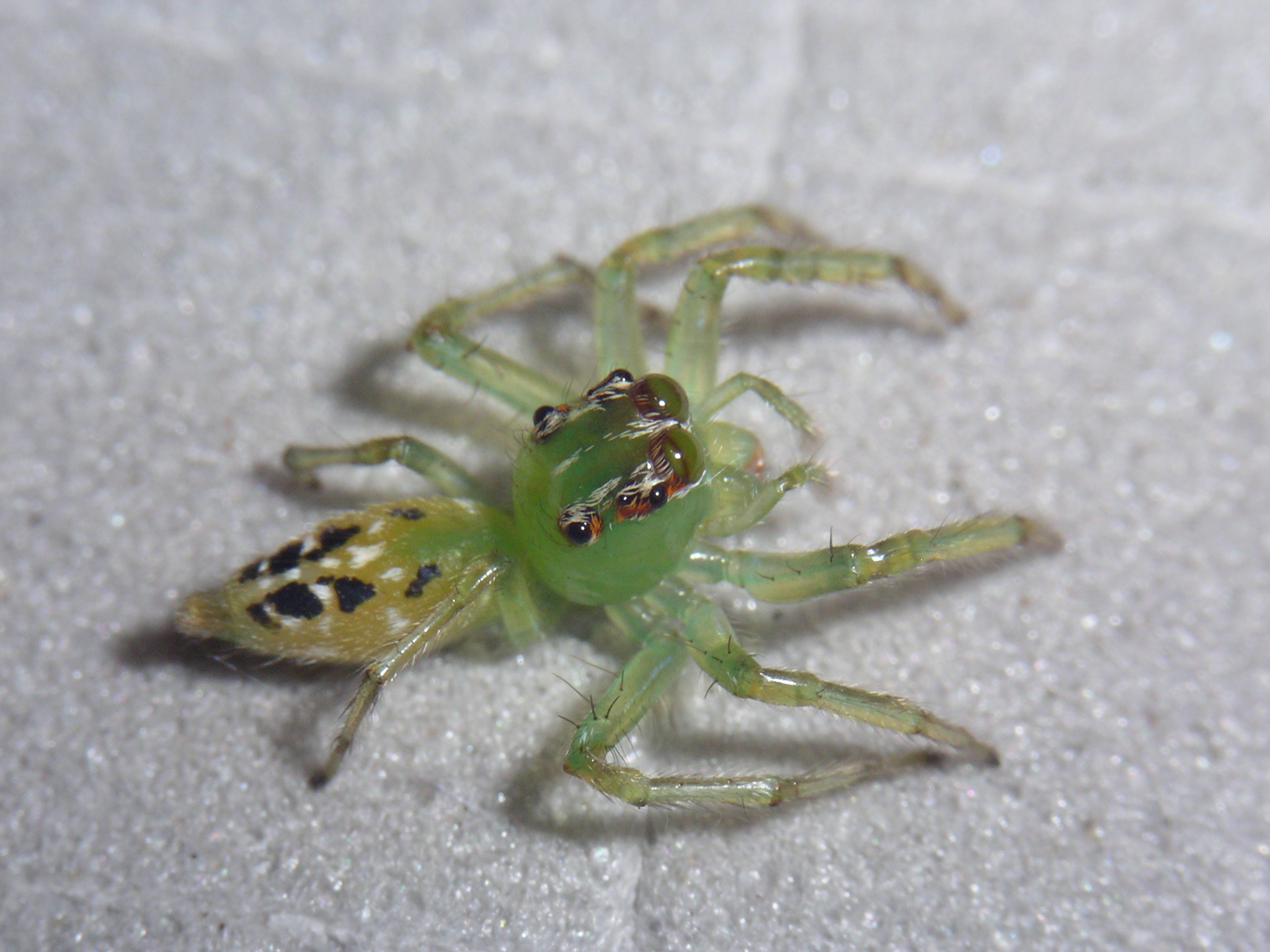
- Female
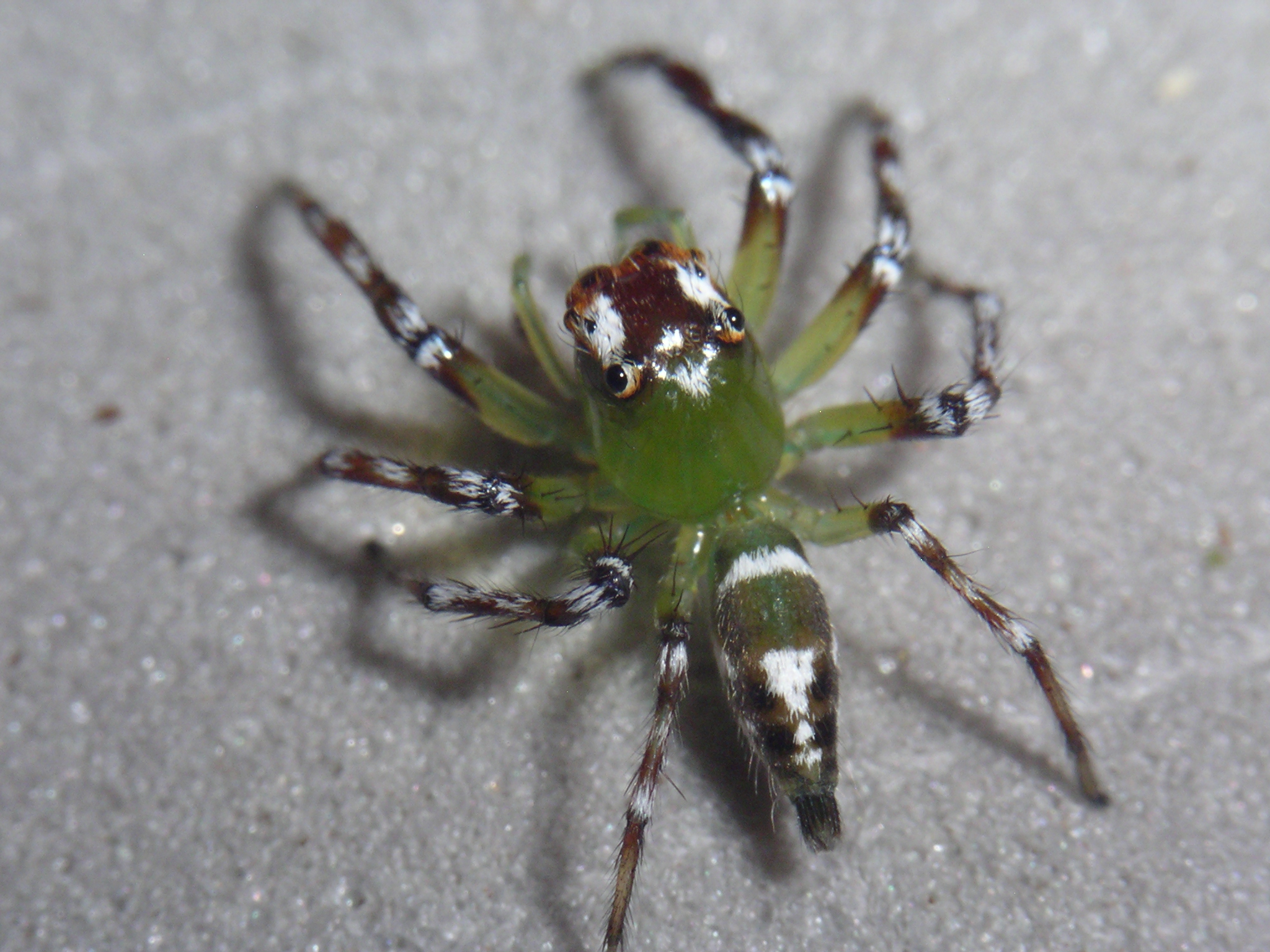
- Male

Scientific classification
- Kingdom: Animalia
- Phylum: Arthropoda
- Subphylum: Chelicerata
- Class: Arachnida
- Order: Araneae
- Infraorder: Araneomorphae
- Family: Salticidae
- Genus: Acragas
- Species: A. longimanus

Binomial name
- Acragas longimanus Simon, 1900

= Acragas longimanus =

Species of spider

Acragas longimanus is a species of jumping spider in the genus Acragas. It was first described in 1900 by Eugène Simon. These spiders are found in Brazil.
