= Pseudosphex mellina =

Scientific classification
- Domain: Eukaryota
- Kingdom: Animalia
- Phylum: Arthropoda
- Class: Insecta
- Order: Lepidoptera
- Superfamily: Noctuoidea
- Family: Erebidae
- Subfamily: Arctiinae
- Genus: Pseudosphex
- Species: P. mellina

Binomial name
- Pseudosphex mellina (Herrich-Schäffer, 1855)

Synonyms
- Chrysostola mellina Herrich-Schäffer, [1855]

Species of moth

Pseudosphex mellina is a moth of the subfamily Arctiinae. It was described by Gottlieb August Wilhelm Herrich-Schäffer in 1855. It is found in Venezuela and Pará, Brazil.
