= Pseudosphex dycladioides =

Scientific classification
- Kingdom: Animalia
- Phylum: Arthropoda
- Class: Insecta
- Order: Lepidoptera
- Superfamily: Noctuoidea
- Family: Erebidae
- Subfamily: Arctiinae
- Genus: Pseudosphex
- Species: P. dycladioides

Binomial name
- Pseudosphex dycladioides (Heylaerts, 1890)

Synonyms
- Haematerion dycladioides Heylaerts, 1890

Species of moth

Pseudosphex dycladioides is a moth of the subfamily Arctiinae. It was described by Franciscus J. M. Heylaerts in 1890. It is found in São Paulo, Brazil.
