= Pseudosphex aurantivena =

Scientific classification
- Kingdom: Animalia
- Phylum: Arthropoda
- Class: Insecta
- Order: Lepidoptera
- Superfamily: Noctuoidea
- Family: Erebidae
- Subfamily: Arctiinae
- Genus: Pseudosphex
- Species: P. aurantivena

Binomial name
- Pseudosphex aurantivena (Hampson, 1918)

Synonyms
- Chrysostola aurantivena Hampson, 1918

Species of moth

Pseudosphex aurantivena is a moth of the subfamily Arctiinae. It was described by George Hampson in 1918. It is found in Brazil.

The wingspan is 34 mm. The forewings are hyaline (glass like), but the costa and veins are orange yellow. The hindwings are hyaline with an orange-yellow costa and termen.
