= Acragas mendax =

Scientific classification
- Kingdom: Animalia
- Phylum: Arthropoda
- Subphylum: Chelicerata
- Class: Arachnida
- Order: Araneae
- Infraorder: Araneomorphae
- Family: Salticidae
- Genus: Acragas
- Species: A. mendax

Binomial name
- Acragas mendax Bauab & Soares, 1978

Species of spider

Acragas mendax is a species of jumping spider in the genus Acragas. The scientific name of this species was first published in 1978 by Bauab & Soares. These spiders are found in Brazil.
