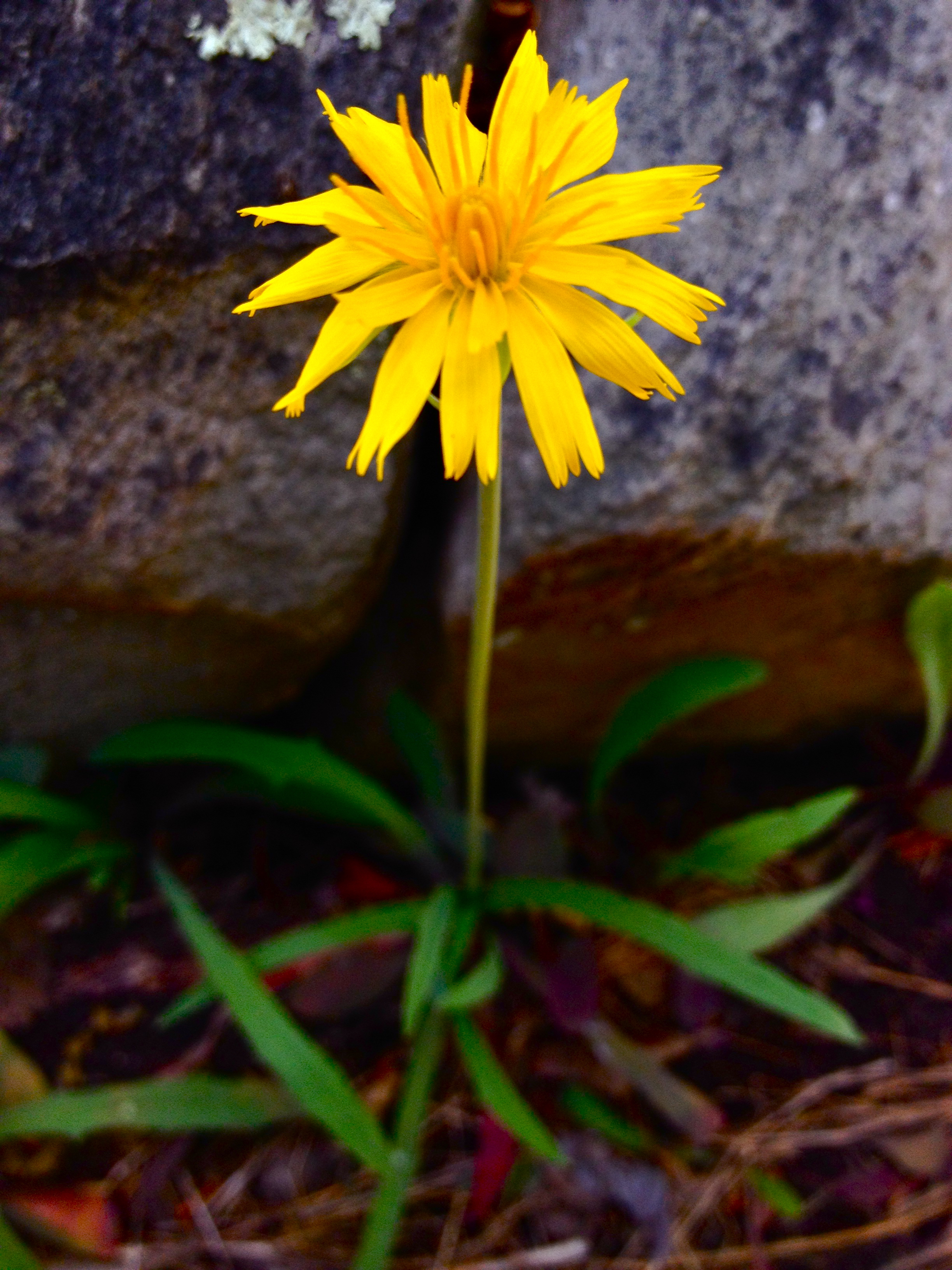

Scientific classification
- Kingdom: Plantae
- Clade: Tracheophytes
- Clade: Angiosperms
- Clade: Eudicots
- Clade: Asterids
- Order: Asterales
- Family: Asteraceae
- Genus: Krigia
- Species: K. dandelion

Binomial name
- Krigia dandelion (L.) Nutt.

Synonyms
- Adopogon dandelion Kuntze; Cynthia boscii DC.; Cynthia dandelion (L.) DC.; Cynthia lyrata Nutt.; Hyoseris angustifolia Michx.; Hyoseris major Walter; Leontodon dandelion L.; Tragopogon dandelion (L.) L.; Troximon dandelion (L.) Gaertn.

= Krigia dandelion =

Species of flowering plant

Krigia dandelion, known as potato dwarfdandelion, is a North American species of plants in the family Asteraceae. It is native to the southeastern and south-central United States, from the Florida Panhandle to Texas and north as far as Kansas, southern Illinois, and Maryland

Krigia dandelion is a perennial herb up to 50 cm (20 inches) tall. One plant generally produces one flower head per flower stalk, each head with 25–34 yellow or yellow-orange ray flowers but no disc flowers.
