= Pseudosphex mellita =

Scientific classification
- Domain: Eukaryota
- Kingdom: Animalia
- Phylum: Arthropoda
- Class: Insecta
- Order: Lepidoptera
- Superfamily: Noctuoidea
- Family: Erebidae
- Subfamily: Arctiinae
- Genus: Pseudosphex
- Species: P. mellita

Binomial name
- Pseudosphex mellita (Schaus, 1911)

Synonyms
- Chrysostola mellita Schaus, 1911; Abrochia mellita Schaus, 1911

Species of moth

Pseudosphex mellita is a moth of the subfamily Arctiinae. It was described by Schaus in 1911. It is found in Costa Rica.
