= Pseudosphex postica =

Scientific classification
- Kingdom: Animalia
- Phylum: Arthropoda
- Class: Insecta
- Order: Lepidoptera
- Superfamily: Noctuoidea
- Family: Erebidae
- Subfamily: Arctiinae
- Genus: Pseudosphex
- Species: P. postica

Binomial name
- Pseudosphex postica (Walker, 1854)

Synonyms
- Glaucopis postica Walker, 1854

Species of moth

Pseudosphex postica is a moth of the subfamily Arctiinae. It was described by Francis Walker in 1854. It is found in the Amazon region.
