= Pseudosphex spitzi =

Scientific classification
- Domain: Eukaryota
- Kingdom: Animalia
- Phylum: Arthropoda
- Class: Insecta
- Order: Lepidoptera
- Superfamily: Noctuoidea
- Family: Erebidae
- Subfamily: Arctiinae
- Genus: Pseudosphex
- Species: P. spitzi

Binomial name
- Pseudosphex spitzi (Zerny, 1931)

Synonyms
- Abrochia spitzi Zerny, 1931

Species of moth

Pseudosphex spitzi is a moth of the subfamily Arctiinae. It was described by Hans Zerny in 1931. It is found in Brazil.
