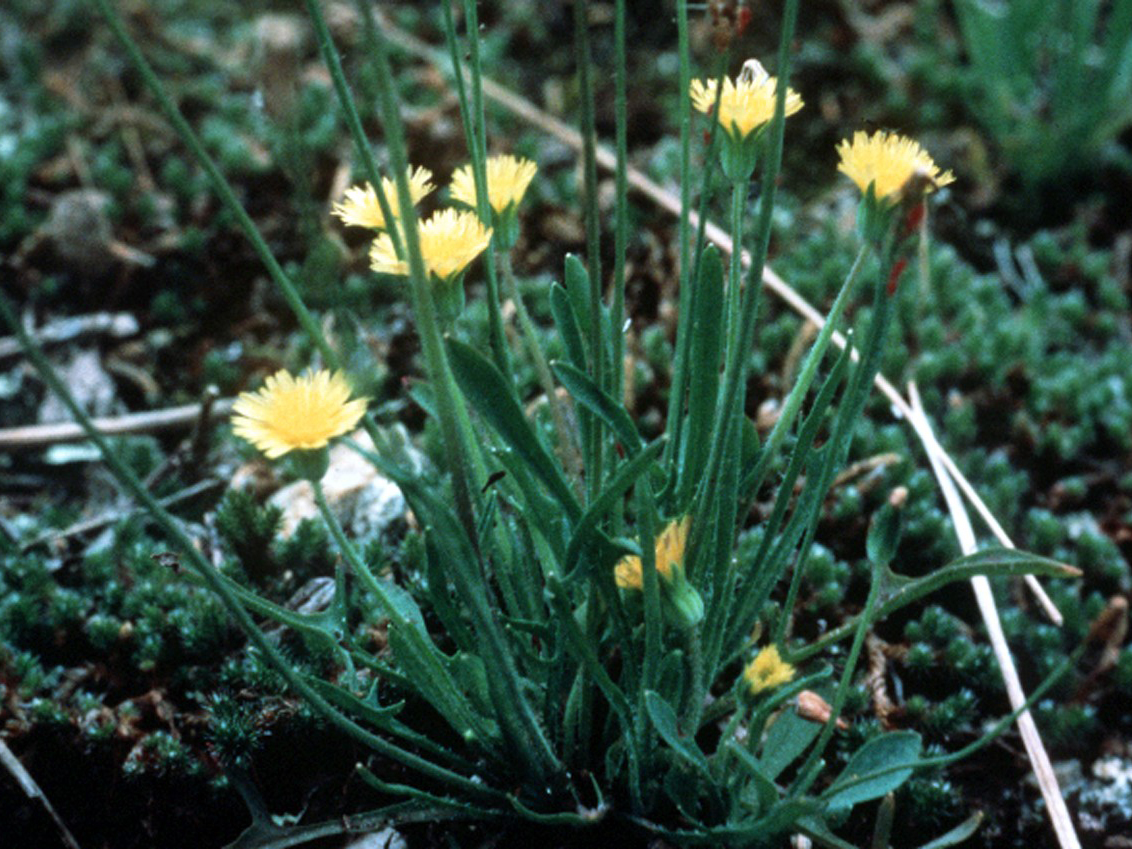

Scientific classification
- Kingdom: Plantae
- Clade: Tracheophytes
- Clade: Angiosperms
- Clade: Eudicots
- Clade: Asterids
- Order: Asterales
- Family: Asteraceae
- Genus: Krigia
- Species: K. virginica

Binomial name
- Krigia virginica (L.) Willd.

Synonyms
- Hyoseris virginica L. (basionym)

= Krigia virginica =

Species of flowering plant

Krigia virginica, also known as dwarf dandelion or Virginia dwarf dandelion, is a North American species of plants in the family Asteraceae. Its native range reaches from Maine to Florida and extends westward to central Texas. It is commonly found in disturbed areas, along roadsides, and within rocky woodlands.

== Description ==
This plant is a spring annual, consisting of a small rosette of leaves up to 6" across and one or more flowering stalks up to 14" tall. Individual plants can bloom while they are a remarkably small size (only 2" across). The basal leaves are up to 3" long and ¾" across. They are light green, oblanceolate, and often pinnatifid with shallow lobes that are pointed at their tips. Their margins are often ciliate, slightly undulate, and sparingly dentate. Each flowering stalk is unbranched and devoid of leaves; it is largely hairless, although there may be a few scattered hairs along its length, especially near the top. Both the basal leaves and flowering stalks contain a white latex.

Each stalk terminates in a flowerhead about ½" across. This flowerhead consists of several spreading ray florets that are truncate with 5 teeth at their tips; these florets are bright golden yellow. The base of each flowerhead consists of 9-18 floral bracts in a single series; these bracts are lanceolate and about ¼" in length. They are erect while the flowerhead is blooming, but eventually become reflexed when the achenes mature. The blooming period occurs from mid-spring to mid-summer and lasts about 2–3 months for a colony of plants. The small achenes are bullet-shaped (tapered at the base, but truncate at the top). Each achene has 5 small scales and a tuft of 5 hairs at its apex; the hairs are longer than the scales. These achenes are distributed by the wind. The root system consists of a tuft of fibrous roots. This plant spreads by reseeding itself.
