= Pseudosphex igniceps =

Scientific classification
- Domain: Eukaryota
- Kingdom: Animalia
- Phylum: Arthropoda
- Class: Insecta
- Order: Lepidoptera
- Superfamily: Noctuoidea
- Family: Erebidae
- Subfamily: Arctiinae
- Genus: Pseudosphex
- Species: P. igniceps

Binomial name
- Pseudosphex igniceps (Draudt, 1915)

Synonyms
- Abrochia igniceps Draudt, 1915; Sphecopsyche julumito Dognin, 1898

Species of moth

Pseudosphex igniceps is a moth of the subfamily Arctiinae. It was described by Max Wilhelm Karl Draudt in 1915. It is found in Peru.
