= Pseudosphex discoplaga =

Scientific classification
- Domain: Eukaryota
- Kingdom: Animalia
- Phylum: Arthropoda
- Class: Insecta
- Order: Lepidoptera
- Superfamily: Noctuoidea
- Family: Erebidae
- Subfamily: Arctiinae
- Genus: Pseudosphex
- Species: P. discoplaga

Binomial name
- Pseudosphex discoplaga (Schaus, 1905)

Synonyms
- Abrochia discoplaga Schaus, 1905

Species of moth

Pseudosphex discoplaga is a moth of the subfamily Arctiinae. It was described by Schaus in 1905. It is found in Venezuela.
