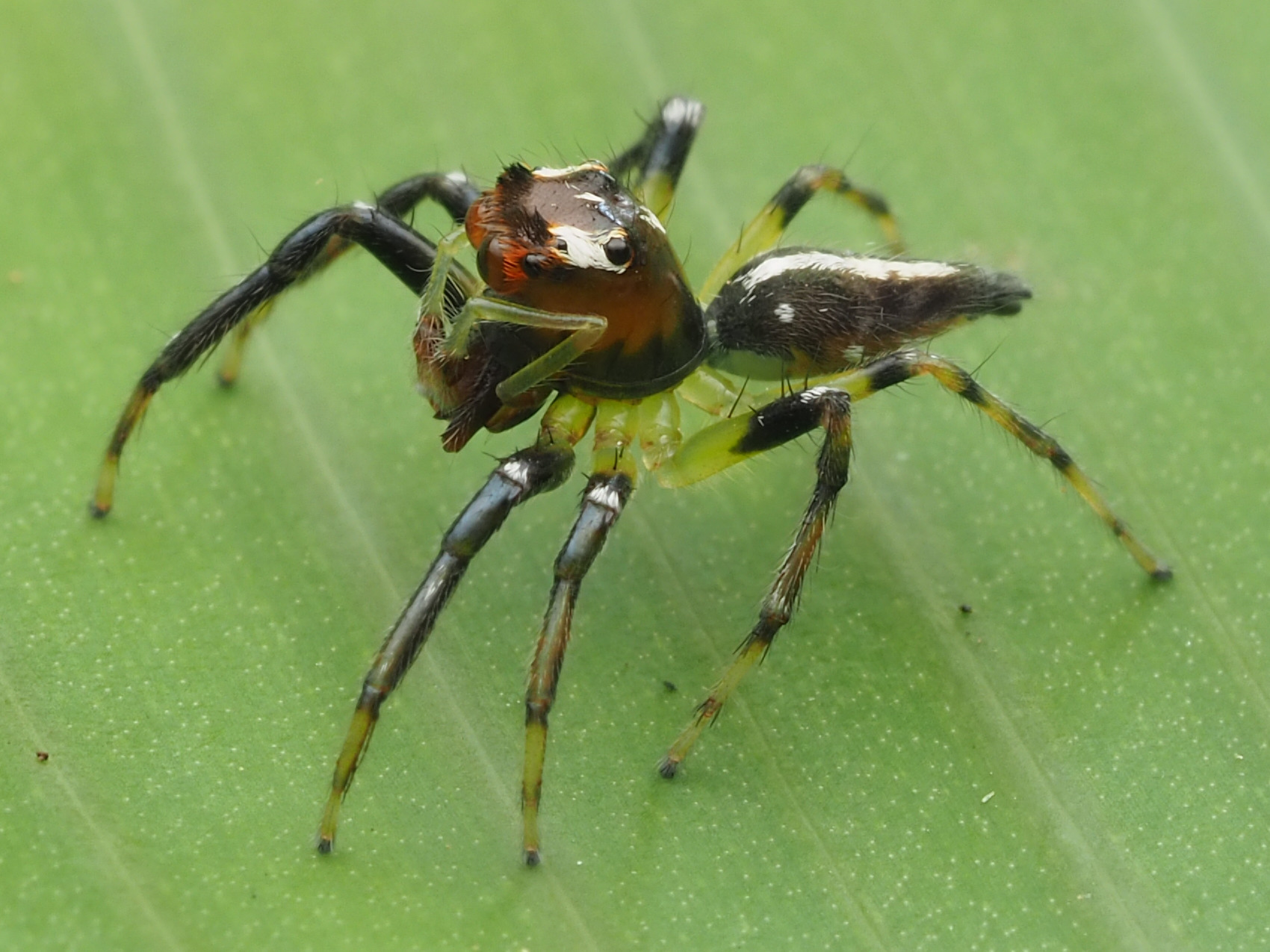

Scientific classification
- Kingdom: Animalia
- Phylum: Arthropoda
- Subphylum: Chelicerata
- Class: Arachnida
- Order: Araneae
- Infraorder: Araneomorphae
- Family: Salticidae
- Genus: Acragas
- Species: A. longipalpus

Binomial name
- Acragas longipalpus Peckham & Peckham, 1885

= Acragas longipalpus =

Species of spider

Acragas longipalpus is a species of jumping spider in the family Salticidae. It was first described in 1885 by Peckham & Peckham.

== Distribution ==
Acragas longipalpus is found in Guatemala.
