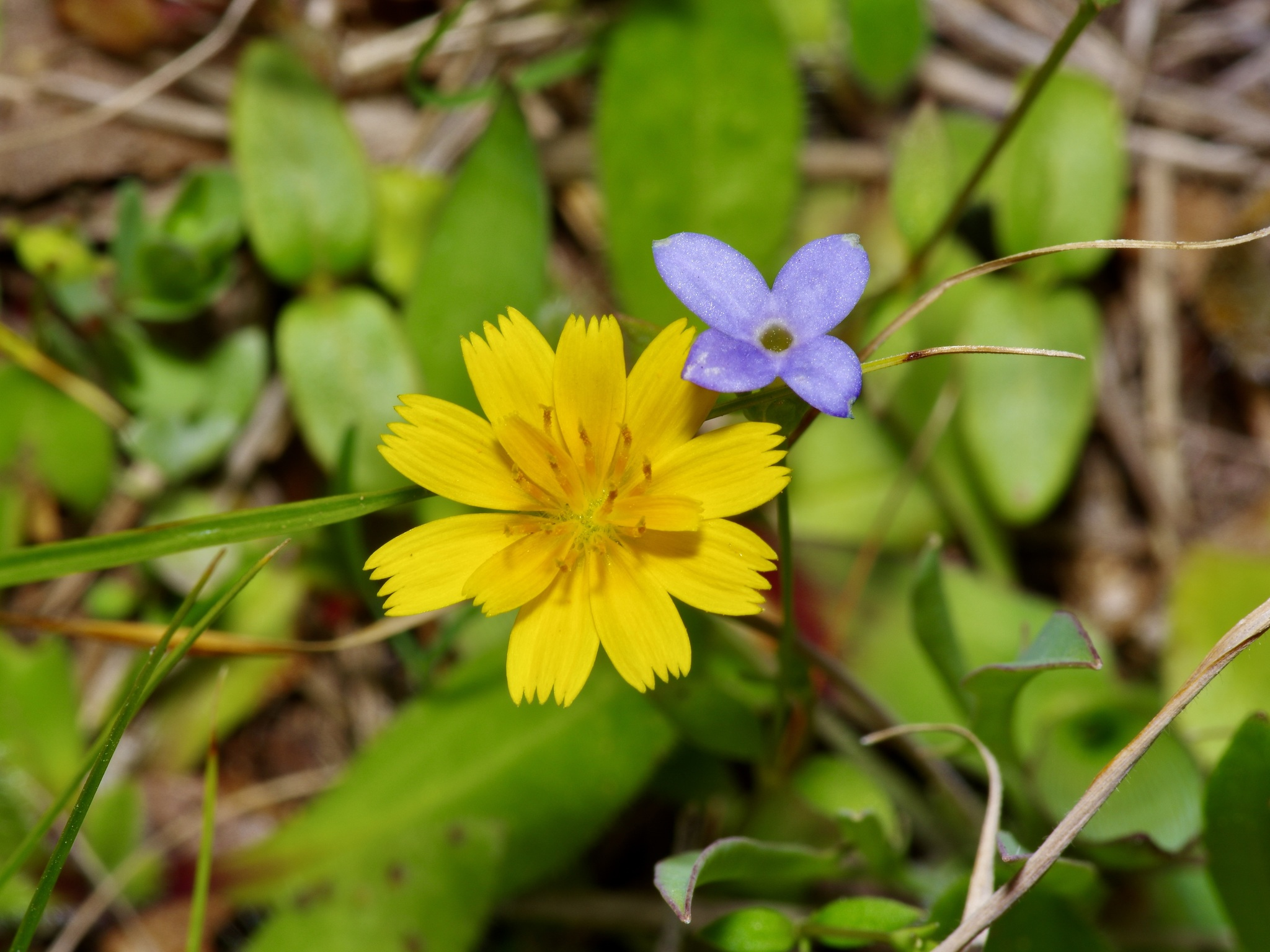

Scientific classification
- Kingdom: Plantae
- Clade: Tracheophytes
- Clade: Angiosperms
- Clade: Eudicots
- Clade: Asterids
- Order: Asterales
- Family: Asteraceae
- Genus: Krigia
- Species: K. occidentalis

Binomial name
- Krigia occidentalis Nutt.

Synonyms
- Adopogon occidentale (Nutt.) Kuntze; Adopogon occidentalis (Nutt.) Kuntze; Cymbia occidentalis (Nutt.) Standl.; Krigia bellidioides Scheele; Krigia nervosa Hook.

= Krigia occidentalis =

Species of flowering plant

Krigia occidentalis, known as western dwarfdandelion, is a North American species of plant in the family Asteraceae. It is native to the southern Great Plains and the Ozark Mountains of the south-central United States (Kansas, Missouri, Arkansas, Oklahoma, Texas, Louisiana).

Krigia occidentalis is a small annual herb, rarely more than 16 cm (6.4 inches) tall, with a taproot. The plant produces only one flower head per flower stalk, each head with 5–25 yellow ray flowers but no disc flowers.
