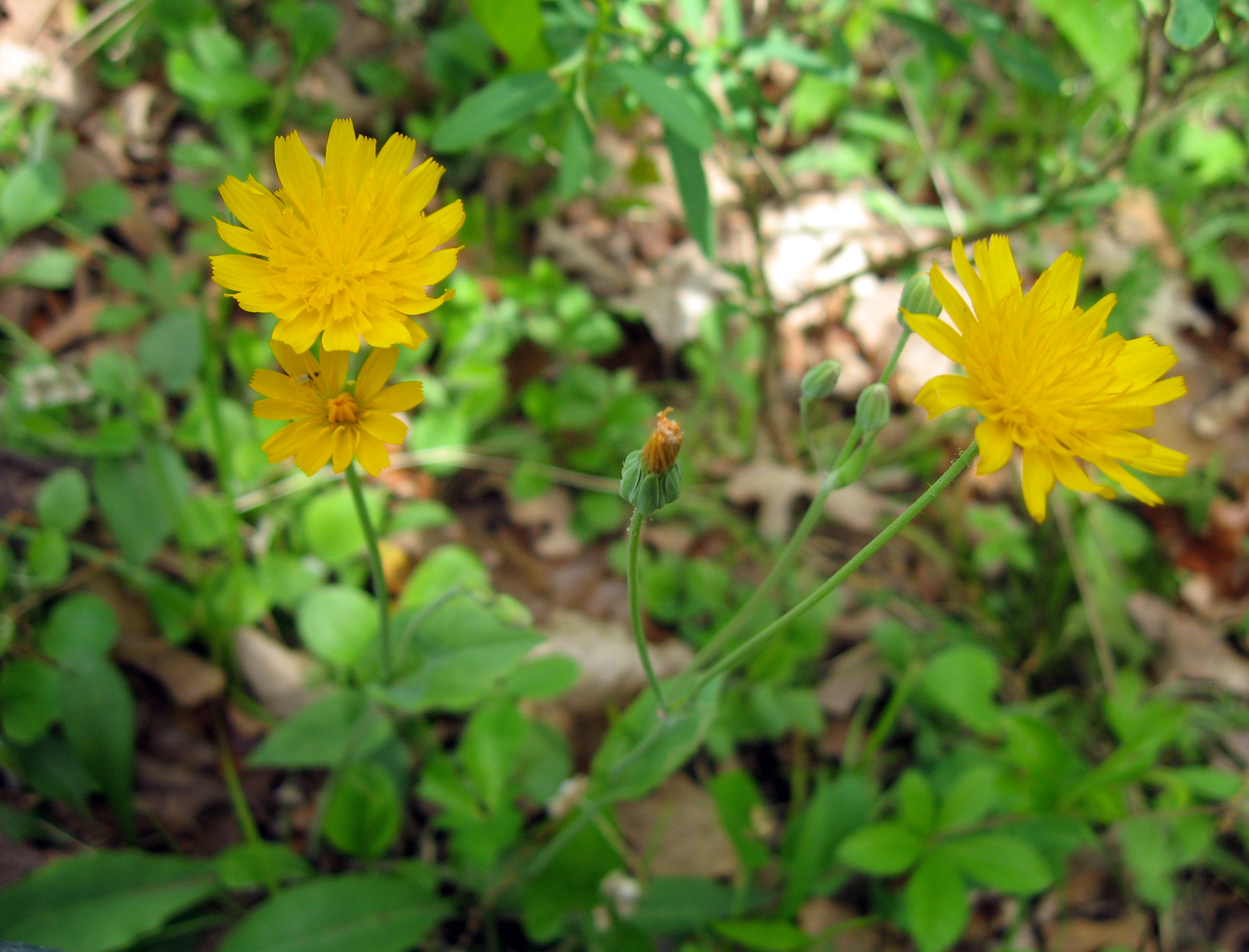

Conservation status
- Secure (NatureServe)

Scientific classification
- Kingdom: Plantae
- Clade: Tracheophytes
- Clade: Angiosperms
- Clade: Eudicots
- Clade: Asterids
- Order: Asterales
- Family: Asteraceae
- Genus: Krigia
- Species: K. biflora

Binomial name
- Krigia biflora (Walter) S.F.Blake 1915

Synonyms
- Hyoseris biflora Walter; Adopogon amplexicaule (Nutt.) Kuntze; Adopogon amplexicaulis (Michx.) Kuntze; Adopogon virginicum Kuntze; Cynthia amplexicaulis (Michx.) L.C.Beck; Cynthia falcata Standl.; Cynthia griffithii Nutt.; Cynthia virginica (L.) D.Don ex DC.; Cynthia viridis Standl.; Hyoseris amplexicaulis Michx.; Hyoseris minor J.F.Gmel.; Hyoseris prenanthoides Willd.; Krigia amplexicaulis (Michx.) Nutt.; Luthera virginica (L.) Sch.Bip.; Tragopogon virginicus L.; Troximon virginicum (L.) Gaertn.

= Krigia biflora =

Species of flowering plant

Krigia biflora, also known as two-flower cynthia or two-flower dwarf dandelion, is a species of plant in the family Asteraceae. It is native to North America, where it is found in central Canada (Manitoba and Ontario) and in the eastern, central, and southwestern United States. This species is rare in Connecticut, and it is listed as a species of special concern.

Krigia biflora is an erect perennial growing 450–800 mm (18–31 in) tall. One plant can have 20 or more flower heads, very often two per flower stalk, each head with 25–60 yellow to orange-yellow ray flowers about 25–40 mm (1–1 1/2 in) across. There are no disc flowers. It can be an aggressively spreading plant. It grows in a variety of habitats and soils and blooms in late spring to late summer. The name of the plant consists of two words: Krigia for David Krieg, the German physician who first collected this plant in Maryland; and biflora, meaning two-flowered. Its habitats include streams, meadows, and moist prairies.
