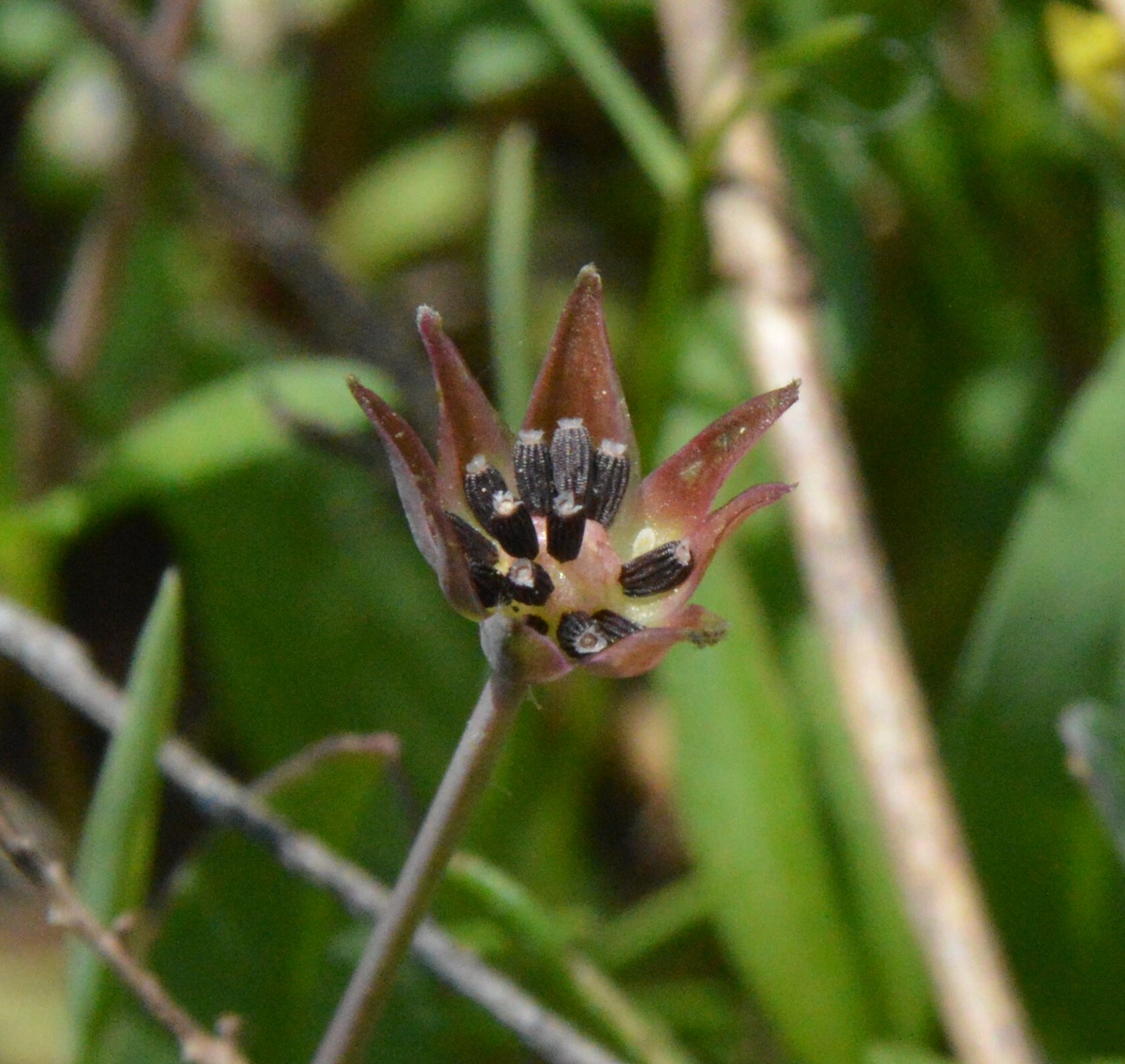

Scientific classification
- Kingdom: Plantae
- Clade: Tracheophytes
- Clade: Angiosperms
- Clade: Eudicots
- Clade: Asterids
- Order: Asterales
- Family: Asteraceae
- Genus: Krigia
- Species: K. wrightii

Binomial name
- Krigia wrightii (A.Gray) K.L.Chambers ex K.J.Kim

Synonyms
- Apogon wrightii A.Gray; Serinia wrightii (A.Gray) Kuntze

= Krigia wrightii =

Species of flowering plant

Krigia wrightii, known as Wright's dwarfdandelion, is a North American species of plants in the family Asteraceae. It is native to the southern Great Plains of the south-central United States (Arkansas, Oklahoma, Texas, Louisiana).

Krigia wrightii is a small annual rarely more than 25 cm (10 inches) tall, with a taproot. The plant produces only one flower hear per flower stalk, each head with 5–25 yellow ray flowers but no disc flowers.
