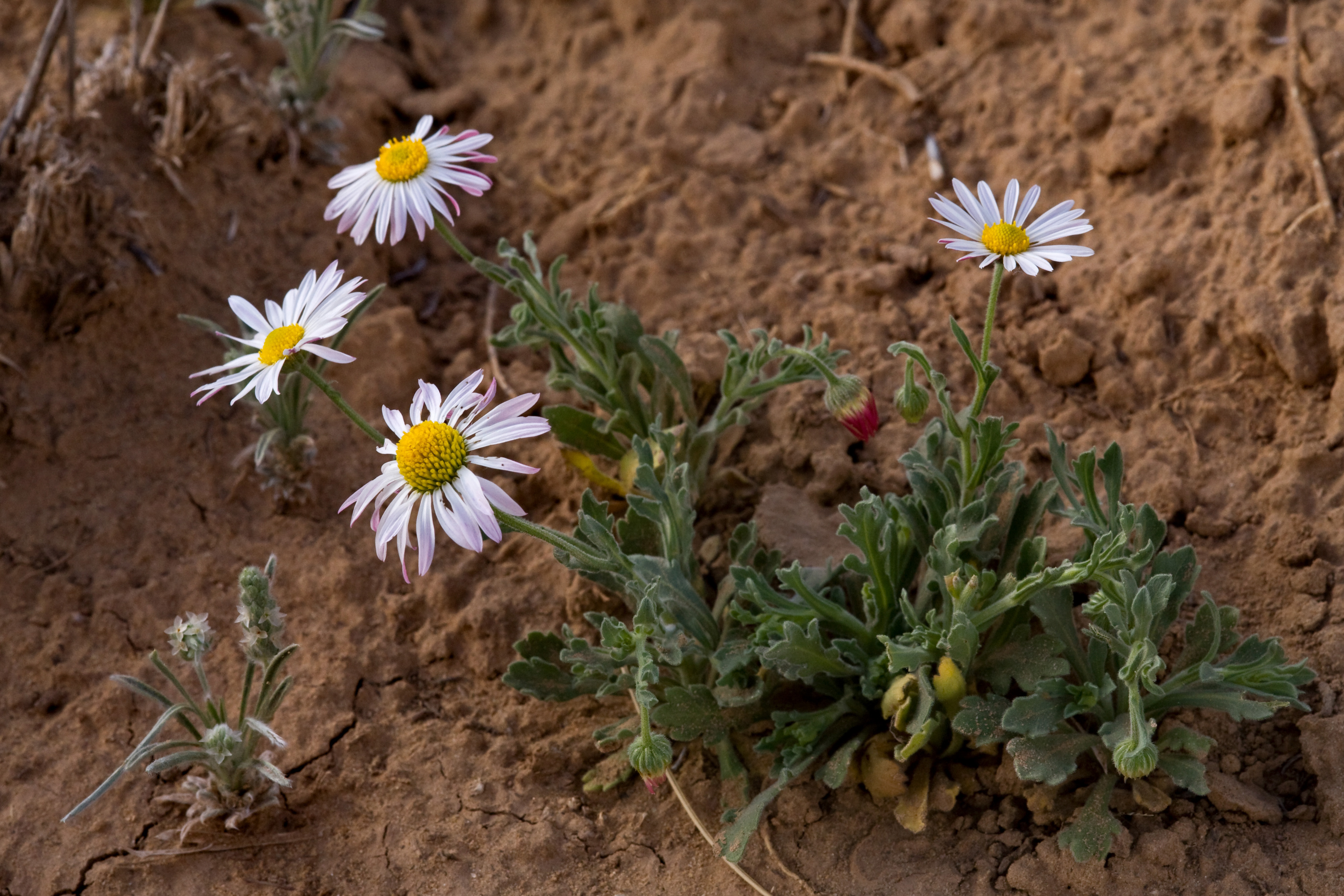
- Aphanostephus ramosissimus

Scientific classification
- Kingdom: Plantae
- Clade: Embryophytes
- Clade: Tracheophytes
- Clade: Angiosperms
- Clade: Eudicots
- Clade: Asterids
- Order: Asterales
- Family: Asteraceae
- Subfamily: Asteroideae
- Tribe: Astereae
- Subtribe: Conyzinae
- Genus: Aphanostephus; DC.

Synonyms
- Leucopsidium Charpent. ex DC.; Keerlia DC.

= Aphanostephus =

Genus of flowering plants

Aphanostephus (dozedaisy) is a genus of flowering plants in the family Asteraceae.

Aphanostephus is native to Mexico, Guatemala, and the southern United States.

Species

- Aphanostephus jaliscensis Shinners - Jalisco
- Aphanostephus pachyrrhizus Shinners - Hidalgo, México, Puebla, Veracruz
- Aphanostephus perennis Wooton & Standl. - Chihuahua, New Mexico
- Aphanostephus pilosus Buckley - Texas, New Mexico, Oklahoma
- Aphanostephus pinulensis J.M.Coult. ex Donn.Sm. - Guatemala
- Aphanostephus ramosissimus DC. - Texas, New Mexico, Oklahoma, Arizona, northeastern Mexico as far south as Puebla
- Aphanostephus riddellii Torr. & A.Gray - Coahuila, Texas, New Mexico
- Aphanostephus skirrhobasis (DC.) Trel. ex Coville & Branner - southern USA from Texas to Florida + Kansas
