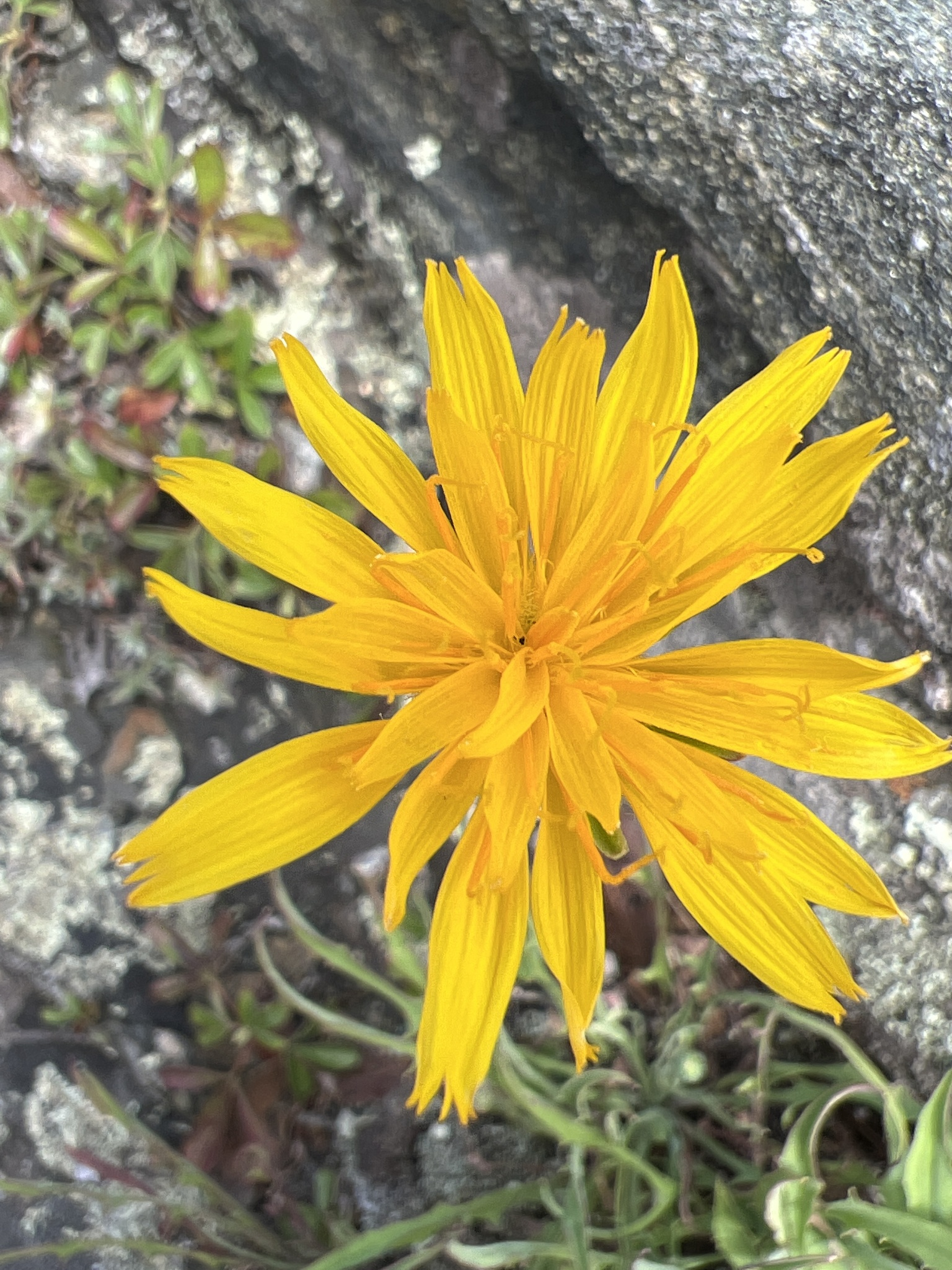

Conservation status
- Vulnerable (NatureServe)

Scientific classification
- Kingdom: Plantae
- Clade: Tracheophytes
- Clade: Angiosperms
- Clade: Eudicots
- Clade: Asterids
- Order: Asterales
- Family: Asteraceae
- Genus: Krigia
- Species: K. montana

Binomial name
- Krigia montana (Michx.) Nutt. 1818

Synonyms
- Adopogon montanus (Michx.) Kuntze; Cynthia montana (Michx.) Standl.; Hyoseris montana Michx. 1803; Cynthia dandelion var. montana (Michx.) Chapm.

= Krigia montana =

Species of flowering plant

Krigia montana, known as mountain dwarfdandelion, is a North American species of plants in the family Asteraceae. It is native to the Great Smoky Mountains and other nearby peaks in the southern Appalachians of Tennessee, the Carolinas, and Georgia. It is found on cliffs and outcrops at high elevations.

Krigia montana is a perennial herb up to 50 cm (20 inches) tall. One plant can produce 20 or more flower heads, each head with 25–60 yellow ray flowers but no disc flowers.
