= Pseudosphex munda =

Scientific classification
- Kingdom: Animalia
- Phylum: Arthropoda
- Class: Insecta
- Order: Lepidoptera
- Superfamily: Noctuoidea
- Family: Erebidae
- Subfamily: Arctiinae
- Genus: Pseudosphex
- Species: P. munda

Binomial name
- Pseudosphex munda (Walker, 1856)

Synonyms
- Isanthrene munda Walker, 1856

Species of moth

Pseudosphex munda is a moth of the subfamily Arctiinae. It was described by Francis Walker in 1856. It is found in the Amazon region.
