= Pseudosphex caurensis =

Scientific classification
- Domain: Eukaryota
- Kingdom: Animalia
- Phylum: Arthropoda
- Class: Insecta
- Order: Lepidoptera
- Superfamily: Noctuoidea
- Family: Erebidae
- Subfamily: Arctiinae
- Genus: Pseudosphex
- Species: P. caurensis

Binomial name
- Pseudosphex caurensis (Klages, 1906)

Synonyms
- Pseudargyroeides caurensis Klages, 1906

Species of moth

Pseudosphex caurensis is a moth of the subfamily Arctiinae. It was described by Edward A. Klages in 1906. It is found in Venezuela.
