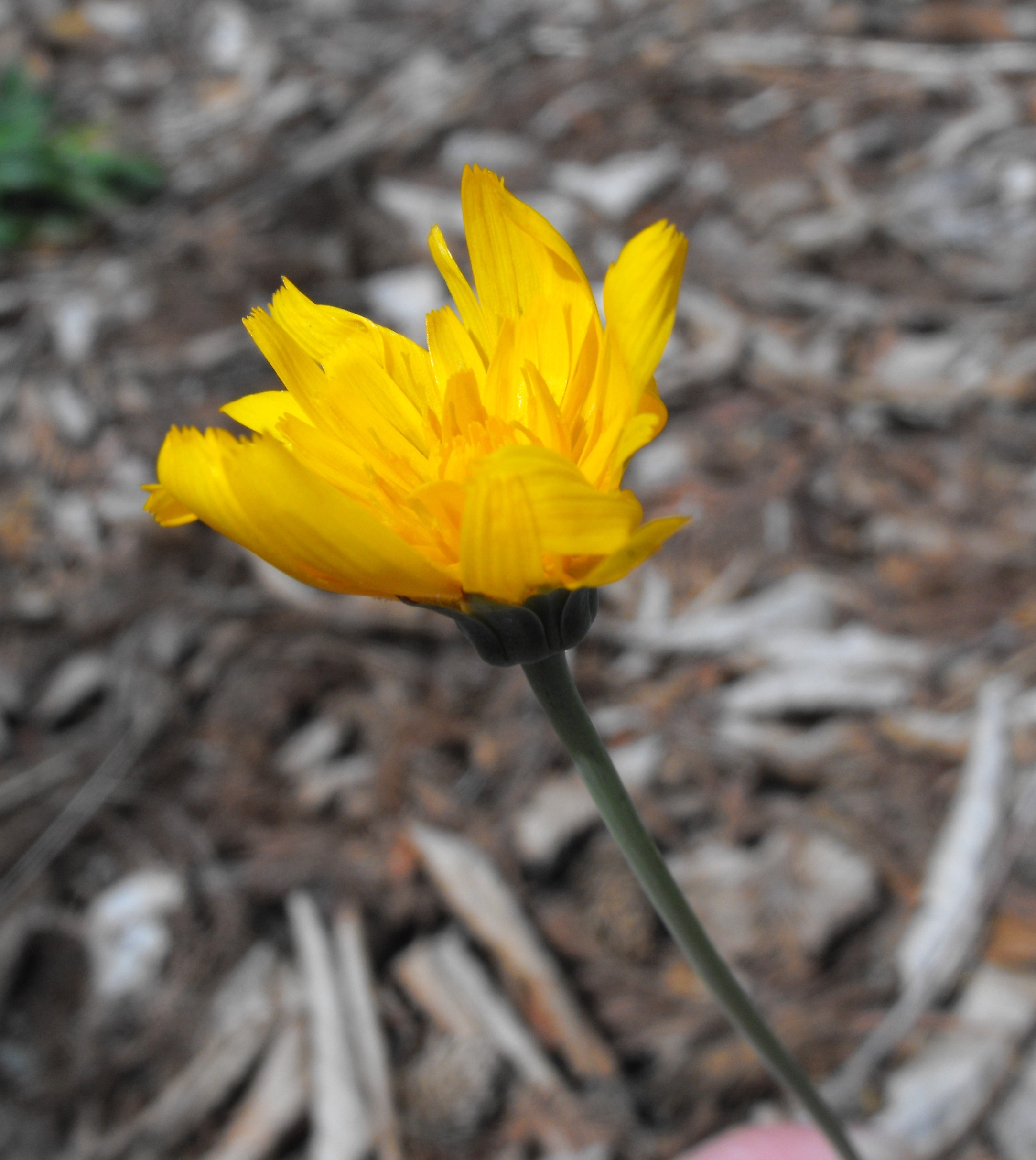
- Krigia biflora

Scientific classification
- Kingdom: Plantae
- Clade: Embryophytes
- Clade: Tracheophytes
- Clade: Angiosperms
- Clade: Eudicots
- Clade: Asterids
- Order: Asterales
- Family: Asteraceae
- Subfamily: Cichorioideae
- Tribe: Cichorieae
- Subtribe: Microseridinae
- Genus: Krigia; Schreb.

Type species
- Krigia virginica (L.) Willd.

Synonyms
- Serinia Raf.; Adopogon Neck.; Apogon Elliott; Cymbia (Torr. & A.Gray) Standl.; Adopogon Neck. ex Kuntze; Cynthia D.Don; Troximon Gaertn.

= Krigia =

Genus of flowering plants

Krigia is a genus of North American flowering plants in the family Asteraceae. Plants of the genus are known generally as dwarf dandelions or dwarfdandelions.

The species vary in morphology. They are annual or perennial herbs growing from a fibrous root system or a taproot. One species has rhizomes with tubers. The plants produce a single stem or up to 50 or more, usually growing erect, reaching a few centimeters to 75 centimeters tall. Most of the leaves are basal, but some stems have leaves higher up. The blades are often linear to lance-shaped, toothed or lobed, and borne on winged petioles. The flower heads are solitary, growing at the top of the stem or on stalks from the leaf axils. They contain up to 60 yellow or orange flowers. The fruit is a hairless, ribbed cypsela, sometimes with a pappus.

Species

- Krigia biflora – twoflower dwarfdandelion, orange dwarfdandelion, tall dwarfdandelion – most of eastern, central, + southwestern USA plus central Canada
- Krigia caroliniana
- Krigia cespitosa – weedy dwarfdandelion, common dwarfdandelion, opposite-leaved dwarfdandelion – southeastern + south-central United States
- Krigia dandelion – potato dwarfdandelion, colonial dwarfdandelion, tuber dandelion – southeastern + south-central United States
- Krigia integrifolia – Allegheny Mountains
- Krigia montana – mountain dwarfdandelion – southern Appalachians
- Krigia occidentalis – western dwarfdandelion – south-central USA
- Krigia virginica – Virginia dwarfdandelion – eastern + south-central United States; Ontario, British Columbia
- Krigia wrightii – Wright's dwarfdandelion – south-central USA
