= Acragas nigromaculatus =

Scientific classification
- Kingdom: Animalia
- Phylum: Arthropoda
- Subphylum: Chelicerata
- Class: Arachnida
- Order: Araneae
- Infraorder: Araneomorphae
- Family: Salticidae
- Genus: Acragas
- Species: A. nigromaculatus

Binomial name
- Acragas nigromaculatus Mello-Leitão, 1922

Species of spider

Acragas nigromaculatus is a species of jumping spider in the genus Acragas. The scientific name of this species was first published in 1922 by Mello-Leitão. These spiders are found in Brazil.
