= Acragas fallax =

Scientific classification
- Kingdom: Animalia
- Phylum: Arthropoda
- Subphylum: Chelicerata
- Class: Arachnida
- Order: Araneae
- Infraorder: Araneomorphae
- Family: Salticidae
- Genus: Acragas
- Species: A. fallax

Binomial name
- Acragas fallax Peckham & Peckham, 1896

Synonyms
- Amycus fallax, Peckham & Peckham, 1896; Amycus palpinalis, Pickard-Cambridge F., 1901

Species of spider

Acragas fallax is a species of jumping spider in the genus Acragas. The scientific name of this species was first published in 1896 by Peckham & Peckham. These spiders are usually easily found in Panama.
