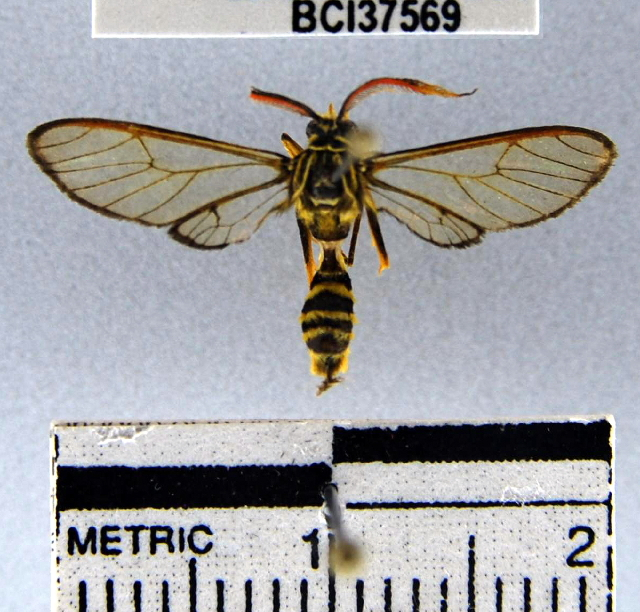
- Pseudosphex laticinctus

Scientific classification
- Kingdom: Animalia
- Phylum: Arthropoda
- Clade: Pancrustacea
- Class: Insecta
- Order: Lepidoptera
- Superfamily: Noctuoidea
- Family: Erebidae
- Subfamily: Arctiinae
- Subtribe: Euchromiina
- Genus: Pseudosphex; Hübner, 1818

Synonyms
- Sphecomorpha Hübner, 1808; Abrochia Herrich-Schäffer, [1855]; Chrysostola Herrich-Schäffer, [1855]; Sphecopsyche Dognin, 1898; Pseudargyroeides Klages, 1906; Pseudargyroides Zerny, 1912

= Pseudosphex =

Genus of moths

Pseudosphex is a genus of tiger moths in the family Erebidae. The genus was erected by Jacob Hübner in 1818. These moths are mimics of a variety of Hymenoptera. The prefix pseudo means "false", and Sphex is a genus of wasps.

"In the cases of moths being like various species of the Hymenoptera aculeata [stinging wasps] it is impossible to argue that the same environment and general conditions can produce habits in moths which are of no use whatever to them except as a disguise. But if the moths themselves were not like the wasps one might argue that it was accidental that the habits were so alike, but the general appearance and structure are in conjunction with the habits so alike that in the species of Pseudosphex it is impossible to distinguish moth from wasp on the flower-heads of Ageratum conyzoides unless one is within eighteen inches or so, while on the wing at any distance it is quite impossible to distinguish them ... the species of Pseudosphex are mimics of the highest degree."

== Species ==
- Pseudosphex aequalis (Walker, [1865])
- Pseudosphex analis (Gaede, 1926)
- Pseudosphex atridorsata (Hampson, 1909)
- Pseudosphex augusta (Druce, 1884)
- Pseudosphex aurantivena (Hampson, 1918)
- Pseudosphex caurensis (Klages, 1906)
- Pseudosphex consobrina Walker, 1856
- Pseudosphex cosmosomoides (Rothschild, 1911)
- Pseudosphex discoplaga (Schaus, 1905)
- Pseudosphex dycladioides (Heylaerts, 1890)
- Pseudosphex eumenoides (Gaede, 1926)
- Pseudosphex faveria (Druce, 1896)
- Pseudosphex fulvisphex (Druce, 1898)
- Pseudosphex humilis (Herrich-Schäffer, [1855])
- Pseudosphex ichneumonea Herrich-Schäffer, [1854]
- Pseudosphex igniceps (Draudt, 1915)
- Pseudosphex laticincta Hampson, 1898
- Pseudosphex leovazquezae (Pérez & Sánchez, 1986)
- Pseudosphex mellina (Herrich-Schäffer, [1855])
- Pseudosphex mellita (Schaus, 1911)
- Pseudosphex moza (Druce, 1896)
- Pseudosphex munda (Walker, 1856)
- Pseudosphex nivaca (E. D. Jones, 1914)
- Pseudosphex pelopia (Druce, 1897)
- Pseudosphex postica (Walker, 1854)
- Pseudosphex sanguiceps (Druce, 1898)
- Pseudosphex sanguitarsia (Hampson, 1898)
- Pseudosphex singularis (Walker, 1854)
- Pseudosphex sodalis (Draudt, 1915)
- Pseudosphex spitzi (Zerny, 1931)
- Pseudosphex tetrazona (Hampson, 1898)
- Pseudosphex variegata (Kaye, 1911)
- Pseudosphex zethus Hübner, 1818
