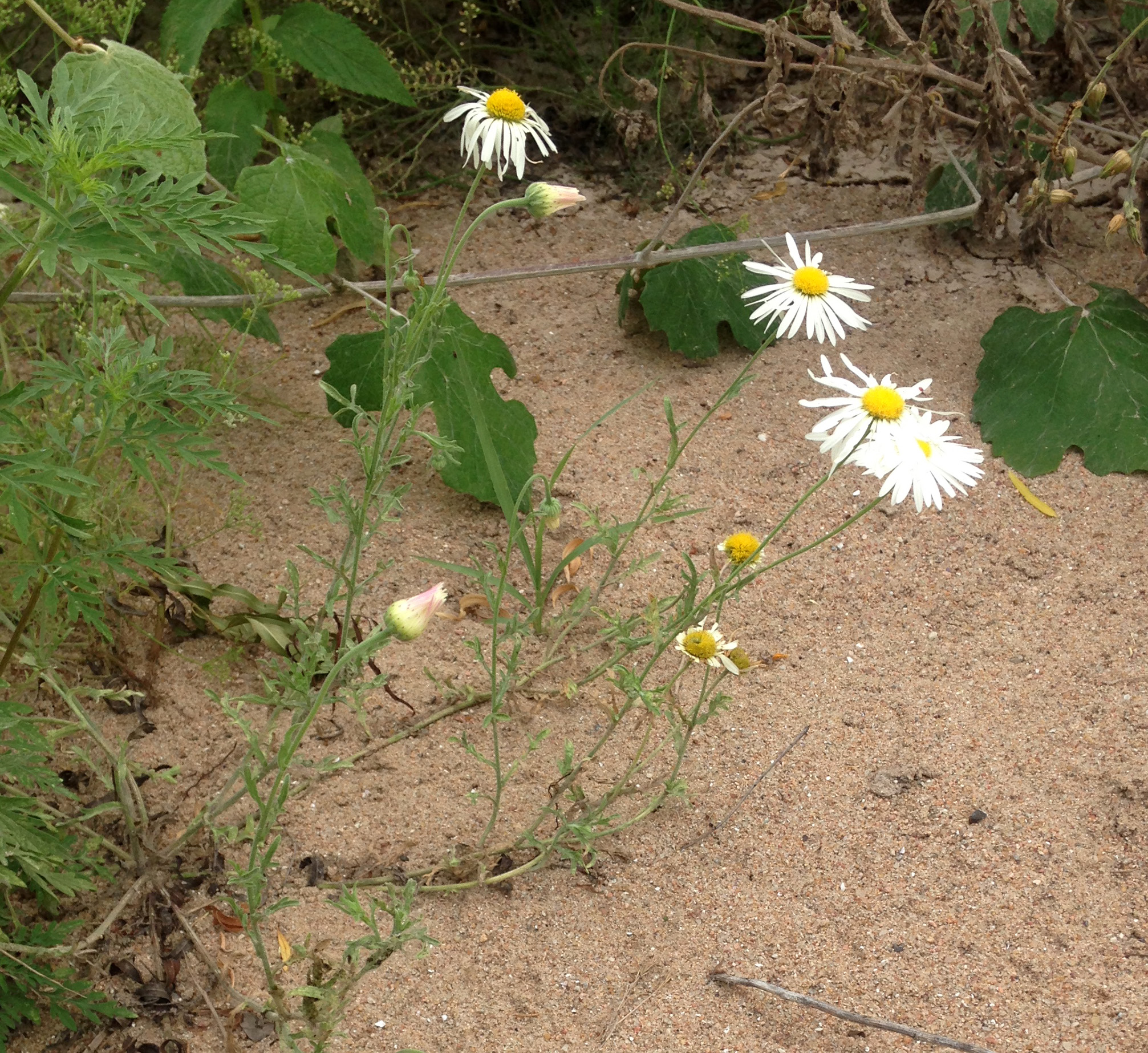

Scientific classification
- Kingdom: Plantae
- Clade: Tracheophytes
- Clade: Angiosperms
- Clade: Eudicots
- Clade: Asterids
- Order: Asterales
- Family: Asteraceae
- Genus: Aphanostephus
- Species: A. skirrhobasis

Binomial name
- Aphanostephus skirrhobasis (DC.) Trel. ex Coville & Branner

Synonyms
- Aphanostephus arkansanus (DC.) A.Gray; Egletes arkansana (DC.) Nutt.; Egletes texana Engelm. ex A.Gray; Keerlia skirrhobasis DC.; Leucopsidium arkansanum DC.; Aphanostephus kidderi S.F.Blake, syn of var. kidderi

= Aphanostephus skirrhobasis =

Species of flowering plant

Aphanostephus skirrhobasis, common name Arkansas lazydaisy, is a North American species of flowering plants in the family Asteraceae. It is native primarily to the southern Great Plains of the United States (Texas, Oklahoma, eastern New Mexico, southern Kansas, southwestern Missouri, western Arkansas, western Louisiana) with additional populations in Florida and the Mexican state of Tamaulipas.

Aphanostephus skirrhobasis is an annual plant up to 45 cm (18 inches) tall.

Varieties

- Aphanostephus skirrhobasis var. kidderi (S.F.Blake) B.L.Turner - sandy and gravelly soils, Texas and Tamaulipas
- Aphanostephus skirrhobasis var. skirrhobasis - most of species range except Florida + Tamaulipas
- Aphanostephus skirrhobasis var. thalassius Shinners - coastal sand dunes in Florida, Louisiana, Texas, Tamaulipas
