= Pseudosphex atridorsata =

Scientific classification
- Kingdom: Animalia
- Phylum: Arthropoda
- Class: Insecta
- Order: Lepidoptera
- Superfamily: Noctuoidea
- Family: Erebidae
- Subfamily: Arctiinae
- Genus: Pseudosphex
- Species: P. atridorsata

Binomial name
- Pseudosphex atridorsata (Hampson, 1909)

Synonyms
- Chrysostola atridorsata Hampson, 1909; Abrochia atridorsata Hampson, 1909

Species of moth

Pseudosphex atridorsata is a moth of the subfamily Arctiinae. It was described by George Hampson in 1909. It is found in Guyana.
