= Pseudosphex cosmosomoides =

Scientific classification
- Domain: Eukaryota
- Kingdom: Animalia
- Phylum: Arthropoda
- Class: Insecta
- Order: Lepidoptera
- Superfamily: Noctuoidea
- Family: Erebidae
- Subfamily: Arctiinae
- Genus: Pseudosphex
- Species: P. cosmosomoides

Binomial name
- Pseudosphex cosmosomoides (Rothschild, 1911)

Synonyms
- Chrysostola cosmosomoides Rothschild, 1911; Abrochia cosmosomoides Rothschild, 1911

Species of moth

Pseudosphex cosmosomoides is a moth of the subfamily Arctiinae. It was described by Rothschild in 1911. It is found in Venezuela.
