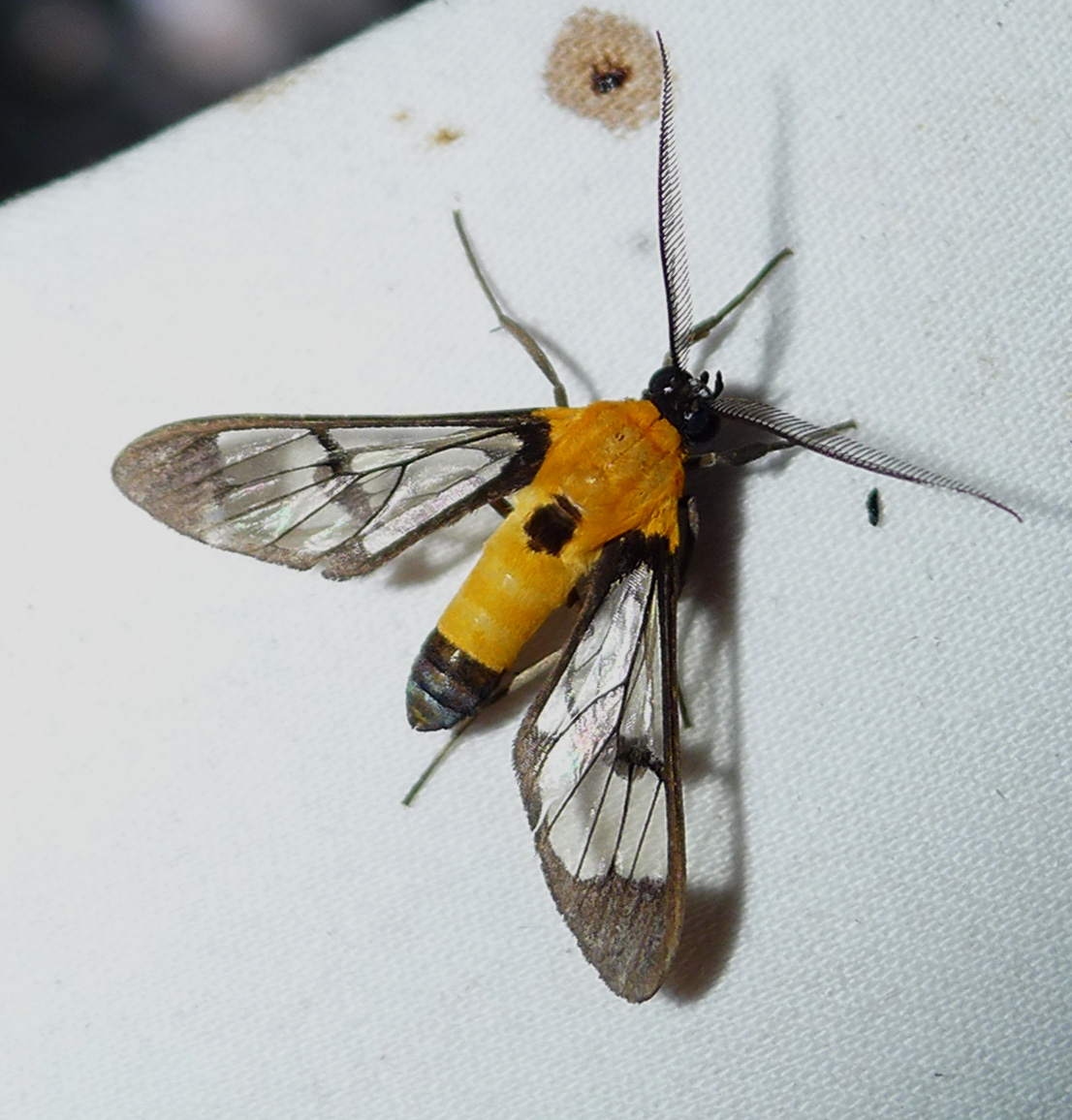

Scientific classification
- Domain: Eukaryota
- Kingdom: Animalia
- Phylum: Arthropoda
- Class: Insecta
- Order: Lepidoptera
- Superfamily: Noctuoidea
- Family: Erebidae
- Subfamily: Arctiinae
- Genus: Pseudosphex
- Species: P. leovazquezae

Binomial name
- Pseudosphex leovazquezae (Pérez & Sánchez, 1986)

Synonyms
- Abrochia leovazquezae Pérez & Sánchez, 1986

= Pseudosphex leovazquezae =

Species of moth

Pseudosphex leovazquezae is a moth of the subfamily Arctiinae. It was described by Pérez and Sánchez in 1986. It is found in southern Texas, Mexico and Guatemala.

Adults are on wing from September to November in Texas.
