= Pseudosphex variegata =

Scientific classification
- Domain: Eukaryota
- Kingdom: Animalia
- Phylum: Arthropoda
- Class: Insecta
- Order: Lepidoptera
- Superfamily: Noctuoidea
- Family: Erebidae
- Subfamily: Arctiinae
- Genus: Pseudosphex
- Species: P. variegata

Binomial name
- Pseudosphex variegata (Kaye, 1911)

Synonyms
- Abrochia variegata Kaye, 1911

Species of moth

Pseudosphex variegata is a moth of the subfamily Arctiinae. It was described by William James Kaye in 1911.
