= Aphanostephus riddellii =

Scientific classification
- Kingdom: Plantae
- Clade: Embryophytes
- Clade: Tracheophytes
- Clade: Spermatophytes
- Clade: Angiosperms
- Clade: Eudicots
- Clade: Asterids
- Order: Asterales
- Family: Asteraceae
- Genus: Aphanostephus
- Species: A. riddellii

Binomial name
- Aphanostephus riddellii Torr. & A.Gray

Species of plant

Aphanostephus riddellii is a North American species of flowering plants in the family Asteraceae, with the common name Riddell's lazydaisy. It is native to the southwestern and south-central United States (states of New Mexico and Texas), as well as to the state of Coahuila in northern Mexico.

Aphanostephus riddellii is perennial herb up to 50 cm (20 inches) tall. It grows in open, sunny locations, often amongst scrub oaks. The plant is named for American botanist John Leonard Riddell, 1807 – 1865.
