= Pseudosphex eumenoides =

Scientific classification
- Domain: Eukaryota
- Kingdom: Animalia
- Phylum: Arthropoda
- Class: Insecta
- Order: Lepidoptera
- Superfamily: Noctuoidea
- Family: Erebidae
- Subfamily: Arctiinae
- Genus: Pseudosphex
- Species: P. eumenoides

Binomial name
- Pseudosphex eumenoides (Gaede, 1926)

Synonyms
- Chrysostola eumenoides Gaede, 1926; Abrochia eumenoides Gaede, 1926

Species of moth

Pseudosphex eumenoides is a moth of the subfamily Arctiinae. It was described by Max Gaede in 1926. It is found in Brazil.
