= Acragas humaitae =

Scientific classification
- Kingdom: Animalia
- Phylum: Arthropoda
- Subphylum: Chelicerata
- Class: Arachnida
- Order: Araneae
- Infraorder: Araneomorphae
- Family: Salticidae
- Genus: Acragas
- Species: A. humaitae

Binomial name
- Acragas humaitae Bauab & Soares, 1978

Species of spider

Acragas humaitae is a species of jumping spider in the genus Acragas. The scientific name of this species was first published in 1978 by Bauab & Soares. These spiders are usually easily found in Brazil.
