= Pseudosphex augusta =

Scientific classification
- Kingdom: Animalia
- Phylum: Arthropoda
- Class: Insecta
- Order: Lepidoptera
- Superfamily: Noctuoidea
- Family: Erebidae
- Subfamily: Arctiinae
- Genus: Pseudosphex
- Species: P. augusta

Binomial name
- Pseudosphex augusta (H. Druce, 1884)

Synonyms
- Dycladia augusta H. Druce, 1884

Species of moth

Pseudosphex augusta is a moth of the subfamily Arctiinae. It was described by Herbert Druce in 1884. It is found in Guatemala.
