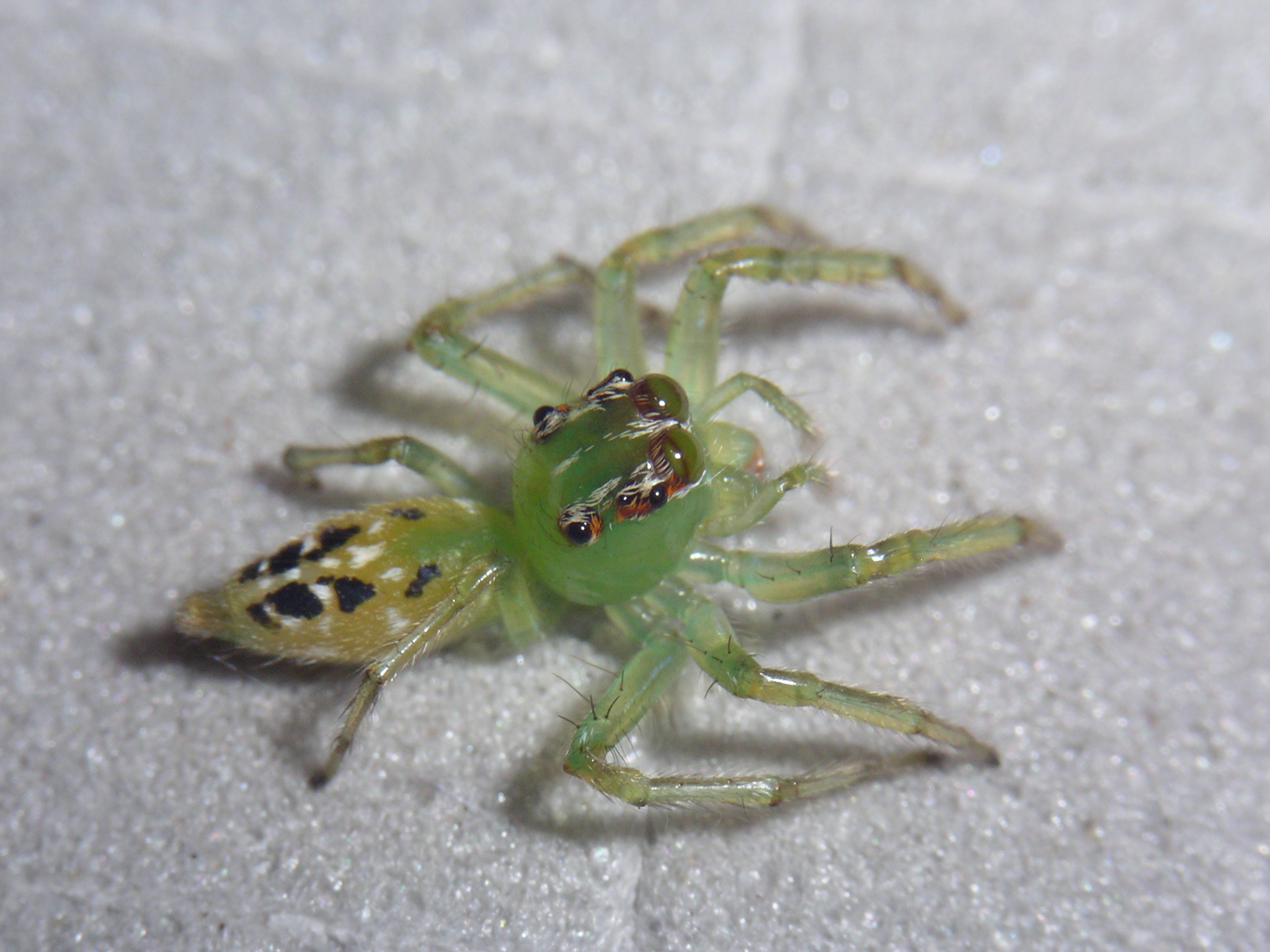
- Female Acragas longimanus in Ecuador

Scientific classification
- Kingdom: Animalia
- Phylum: Arthropoda
- Subphylum: Chelicerata
- Class: Arachnida
- Order: Araneae
- Infraorder: Araneomorphae
- Family: Salticidae
- Subfamily: Salticinae
- Genus: Acragas; Simon, 1900

Type species
- A. longimanus Simon, 1900

Species
- 20, see text

= Acragas (spider) =

Genus of spiders

Acragas is a genus of jumping spiders that was first described by Eugène Louis Simon in 1900. The name is derived from the Greek name of Agrigentum, an ancient city on Sicily.

== Species ==
As of June 2019 it contains twenty species, found only in Central America, South America, and Mexico:

- Acragas carinatus Crane, 1943 – Venezuela
- Acragas castaneiceps Simon, 1900 – Brazil
- Acragas erythraeus Simon, 1900 – Brazil
- Acragas fallax (Peckham & Peckham, 1896) – Panama
- Acragas hieroglyphicus (Peckham & Peckham, 1896) – Mexico to Panama
- Acragas humaitae Bauab & Soares, 1978 – Brazil
- Acragas humilis Simon, 1900 – Brazil
- Acragas leucaspis Simon, 1900 – Venezuela
- Acragas longimanus Simon, 1900 (type) – Brazil
- Acragas longipalpus (Peckham & Peckham, 1885) – Guatemala
- Acragas mendax Bauab & Soares, 1978 – Brazil
- Acragas miniaceus Simon, 1900 – Peru, Brazil
- Acragas nigromaculatus (Mello-Leitão, 1922) – Brazil
- Acragas pacatus (Peckham & Peckham, 1896) – Central America
- Acragas peckhami (Chickering, 1946) – Panama
- Acragas procalvus Simon, 1900 – Peru
- Acragas quadriguttatus (F. O. Pickard-Cambridge, 1901) – Mexico to Panama
- Acragas rosenbergi Simon, 1901 – Ecuador
- Acragas trimaculatus Mello-Leitão, 1917 – Brazil
- Acragas zeteki (Chickering, 1946) – Panama
