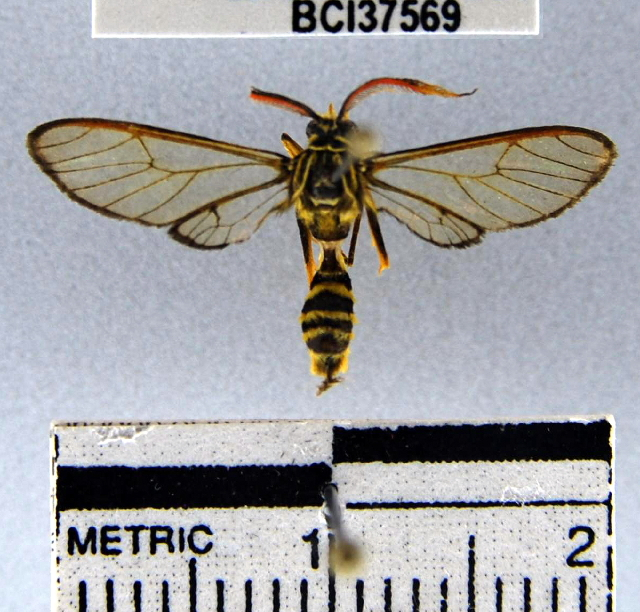

Scientific classification
- Kingdom: Animalia
- Phylum: Arthropoda
- Class: Insecta
- Order: Lepidoptera
- Superfamily: Noctuoidea
- Family: Erebidae
- Subfamily: Arctiinae
- Genus: Pseudosphex
- Species: P. laticincta

Binomial name
- Pseudosphex laticincta Hampson, 1898

Synonyms
- Myrmecopsis laticincta; Myrmecopsis laticinctus; Pseudosphex laticinctus

= Pseudosphex laticincta =

Species of moth

Pseudosphex laticincta is a moth of the subfamily Arctiinae. It was described by George Hampson in 1898. It is found in Guatemala.
