= Acragas carinatus =

Scientific classification
- Kingdom: Animalia
- Phylum: Arthropoda
- Subphylum: Chelicerata
- Class: Arachnida
- Order: Araneae
- Infraorder: Araneomorphae
- Family: Salticidae
- Genus: Acragas
- Species: A. carinatus

Binomial name
- Acragas carinatus Crane, 1943

Species of spider

Acragas carinatus is a species of jumping spider in the genus Acragas. The scientific name of this species was first published in 1943 by Crane, and found in Venezuela.
