= Pseudosphex tetrazona =

Scientific classification
- Kingdom: Animalia
- Phylum: Arthropoda
- Class: Insecta
- Order: Lepidoptera
- Superfamily: Noctuoidea
- Family: Erebidae
- Subfamily: Arctiinae
- Genus: Pseudosphex
- Species: P. tetrazona

Binomial name
- Pseudosphex tetrazona Hampson, 1898

Synonyms
- Chrysostola tetrazona Hampson, 1898

Species of moth

Pseudosphex tetrazona is a moth of the subfamily Arctiinae. It was described by George Hampson in 1898. It is found in Brazil and Bolivia.
