= Pseudosphex ichneumonea =

Scientific classification
- Domain: Eukaryota
- Kingdom: Animalia
- Phylum: Arthropoda
- Class: Insecta
- Order: Lepidoptera
- Superfamily: Noctuoidea
- Family: Erebidae
- Subfamily: Arctiinae
- Genus: Pseudosphex
- Species: P. ichneumonea

Binomial name
- Pseudosphex ichneumonea Herrich-Schäffer, [1854]

Synonyms
- Pseudosphex polybioides Burmeister, 1878; Myrmecopsis crabronis Druce, 1884

Species of moth

Pseudosphex ichneumonea is a moth of the subfamily Arctiinae. It was described by Gottlieb August Wilhelm Herrich-Schäffer in 1854. It is found in Guatemala, Panama, Brazil and Argentina.
