= Pseudosphex zethus =

Scientific classification
- Kingdom: Animalia
- Phylum: Arthropoda
- Clade: Pancrustacea
- Class: Insecta
- Order: Lepidoptera
- Superfamily: Noctuoidea
- Family: Erebidae
- Subfamily: Arctiinae
- Genus: Pseudosphex
- Species: P. zethus

Binomial name
- Pseudosphex zethus Hübner, 1827

Species of moth

Pseudosphex zethus is a moth of the subfamily Arctiinae. It was described by Jacob Hübner in 1827. It is found in Pará, Brazil.
