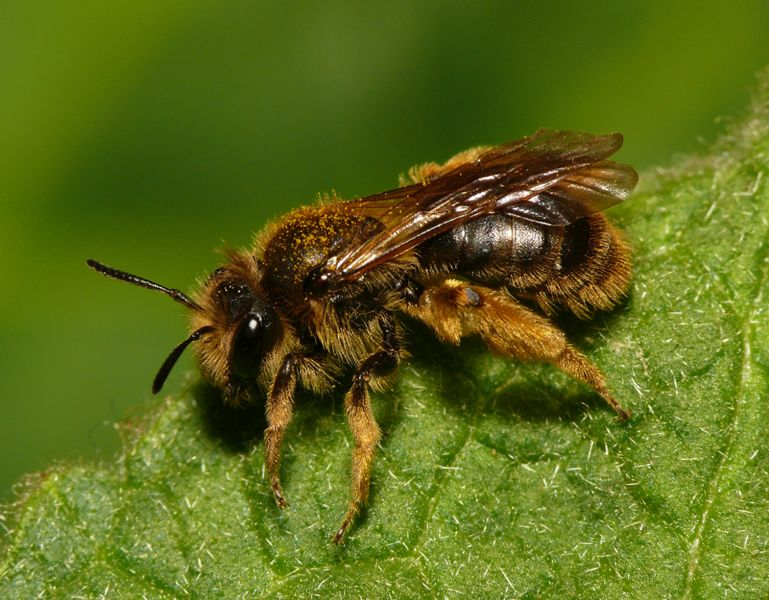
- Andrena humilis the Netherlands

Scientific classification
- Kingdom: Animalia
- Phylum: Arthropoda
- Clade: Pancrustacea
- Class: Insecta
- Order: Hymenoptera
- Family: Andrenidae
- Genus: Andrena
- Species: A. humilis

Binomial name
- Andrena humilis Imhoff, 1832

= Andrena humilis =

Species of bee

Andrena humilis is a Palearctic species of mining bee.
