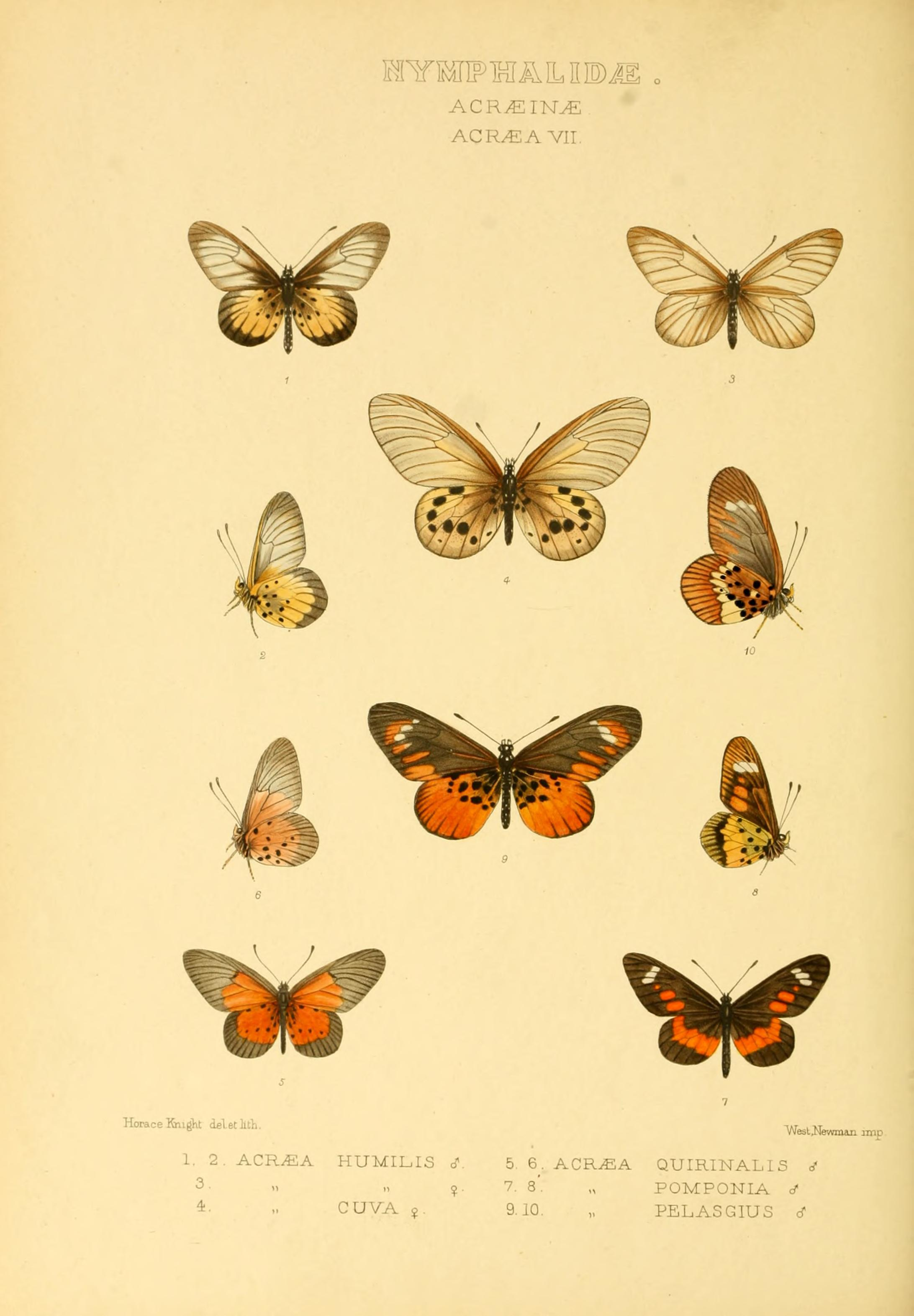
- Figures 1 and 2 (male), 3 (female)

Scientific classification
- Kingdom: Animalia
- Phylum: Arthropoda
- Class: Insecta
- Order: Lepidoptera
- Family: Nymphalidae
- Genus: Acraea
- Species: A. humilis

Binomial name
- Acraea humilis Sharpe, 1897

Synonyms
- Acraea (Actinote) humilis

= Acraea humilis =

Species of butterfly

Acraea humilis is a butterfly in the family Nymphalidae. It is found in Uganda, western Kenya and north-western Tanzania.

== Description ==
Both wings are transparent without red or yellow scales and above almost alike; the hindwing beneath at the base with some small black dots, which are not visible above; the discal dots are wanting.

== Biology ==
The habitat consists of forests.

== Taxonomy ==
See Pierre & Bernaud, 2014
