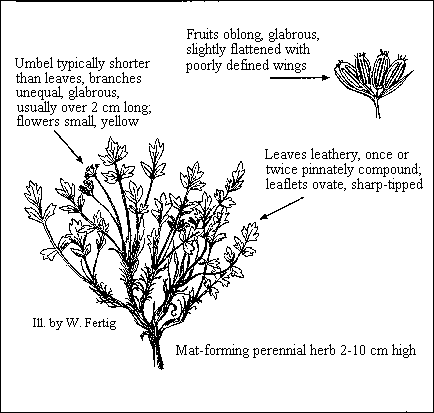
- Larimer aletes

Scientific classification
- Kingdom: Plantae
- Clade: Tracheophytes
- Clade: Angiosperms
- Clade: Eudicots
- Clade: Asterids
- Order: Apiales
- Family: Apiaceae
- Subfamily: Apioideae
- Tribe: Selineae
- Genus: Aletes; J.M.Coult. & Rose

Species
- See text.

= Aletes (plant) =

Genus of flowering plants

Aletes has been regarded a genus of flowering plants in the family Apiaceae, all of which are endemic to North America. As of December 2022, Plants of the World Online regarded Aletes as a synonym of Cymopterus, while GRIN Taxonomy regarded it as a possible synonym of that genus.

Species that may be placed in the genus include the following (placements in Cymopterus from Plants of the World Online):

- Aletes acaulis (Torr.) J.M.Coult. & Rose - stemless Indian parsley → Cymopterus hallii
- Aletes filifolius Mathias, Constance & W.L.Theobald - Trans-Pecos Indian parsley → Cymopterus filifolius
- Aletes humilis J.M.Coult. & Rose - Colorado aletes
- Aletes macdougalii J.M.Coult. & Rose - MacDougal's Indian parsley → Cymopterus macdougalii
- Aletes sessiliflorus W.L.Theobald & C.C.Tseng - sessileflower Indian parsley → Cymopterus sessiliflorus
