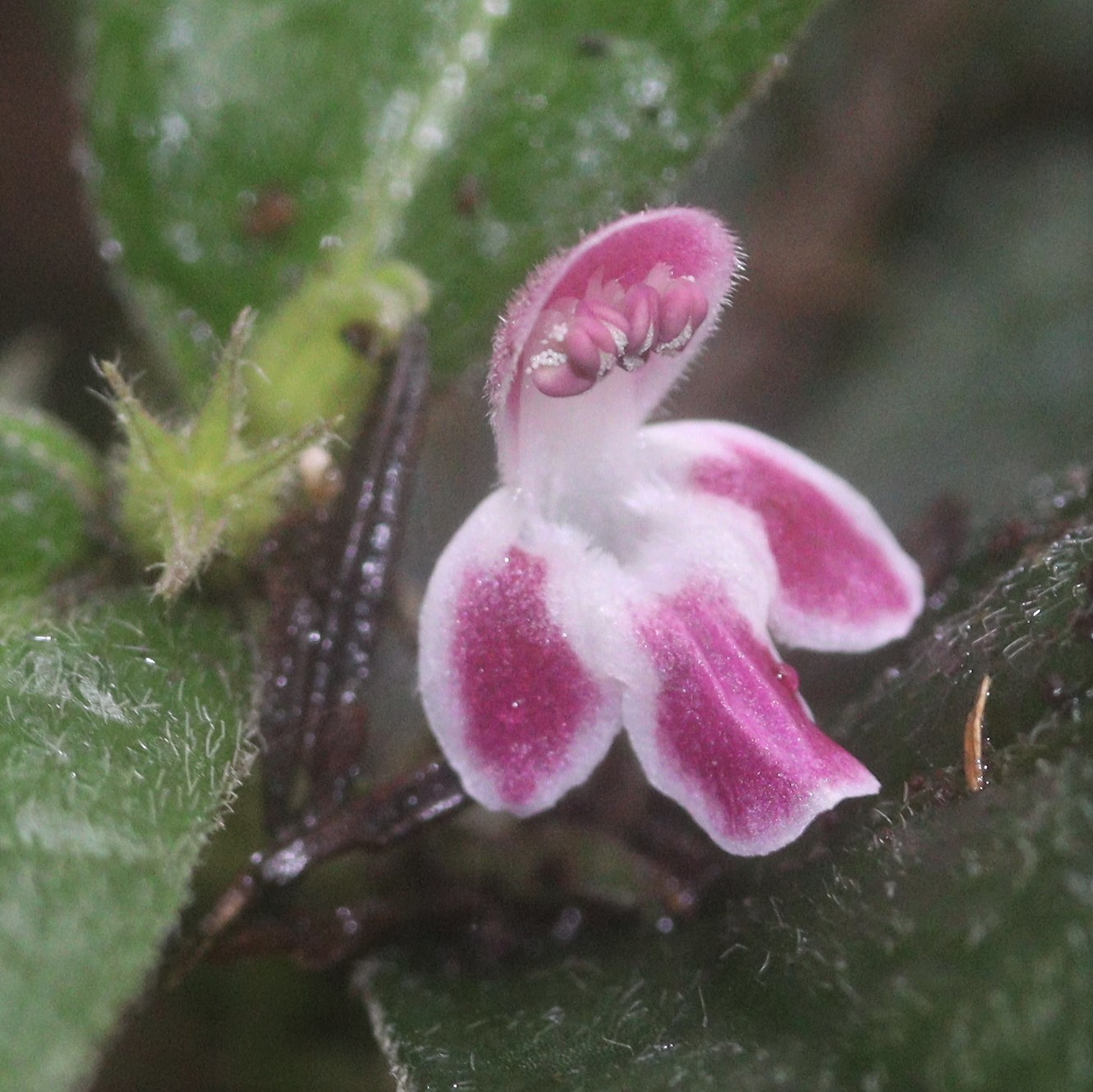

Scientific classification
- Kingdom: Plantae
- Clade: Tracheophytes
- Clade: Angiosperms
- Clade: Eudicots
- Clade: Asterids
- Order: Lamiales
- Family: Lamiaceae
- Subfamily: Lamioideae
- Genus: Ajugoides; Makino
- Species: A. humilis

Binomial name
- Ajugoides humilis (Miq.) Makino

Synonyms
- Ajuga humilis Miq.; Lamium humile (Miq.) Maxim.; Stachys humilis (Miq.) Matsum. & Kudô

= Ajugoides =

Genus of flowering plants

Ajugoides is a genus of plants in the family Lamiaceae, first described in 1915. It has only one known species, Ajugoides humilis, endemic to Japan. It has been reported from the islands of Honshu, Shikoku, and Kyushu.

Ajugoides is closely related to Lamium and considered part of that genus by some authorities.
