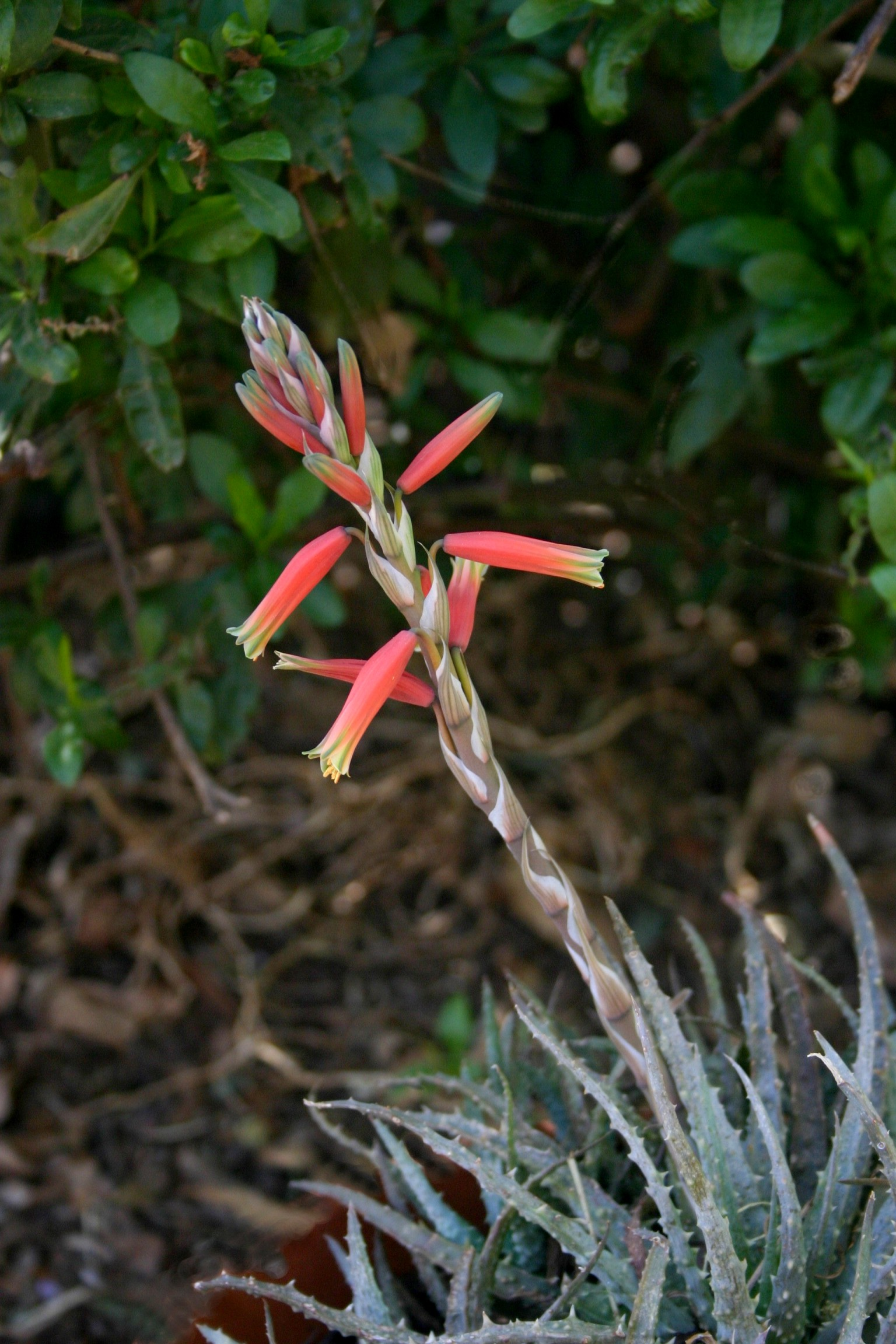

Conservation status
- CITES Appendix II

Scientific classification
- Kingdom: Plantae
- Clade: Tracheophytes
- Clade: Angiosperms
- Clade: Monocots
- Order: Asparagales
- Family: Asphodelaceae
- Subfamily: Asphodeloideae
- Genus: Aloe
- Species: A. humilis

Binomial name
- Aloe humilis (L.) Mill.

Synonyms
- Haworthia ferox Poelln. Haworthia fasciata var. armata Catevala humilis (L.) Medik. Aloe virens var. macilenta Aloe virens Haw. Aloe verrucosospinosa All. Aloe tuberculata Haw. Aloe subtuberculata Haw. Aloe suberecta (Aiton) Haw. Aloe perfoliata var. suberecta Aloe perfoliata var. humilis Aloe macilenta (Baker) G.Nicholson; Aloe incurva (Haw.) Haw. Aloe humilis var. subtuberculata Aloe humilis var. suberecta Aloe humilis var. macilenta Aloe humilis var. incurvata Aloe humilis var. echinata Aloe humilis var. candollei Aloe humilis var. acuminata Aloe echinata Willd. Aloe acuminata var. major Aloe acuminata Haw.

= Aloe humilis =

Species of succulent

Aloe humilis, also known as spider aloe is a species of succulent plant in the genus Aloe. It is endemic to South Africa's Cape Province, and is a low growing, short stemmed aloe with small spines and which grows in dense clusters.
