= Scopula humilis =

Scientific classification
- Kingdom: Animalia
- Phylum: Arthropoda
- Clade: Pancrustacea
- Class: Insecta
- Order: Lepidoptera
- Family: Geometridae
- Genus: Scopula
- Species: S. humilis

Binomial name
- Scopula humilis (Prout, 1913)

Synonyms
- Acidalia humilis Prout, 1913

Species of geometer moth in subfamily Sterrhinae

Scopula humilis is a moth of the family Geometridae. It is found in north-western India.
