= Aletes humilis =

Conservation status
- Imperiled (NatureServe)

Scientific classification
- Kingdom: Plantae
- Clade: Embryophytes
- Clade: Tracheophytes
- Clade: Angiosperms
- Clade: Eudicots
- Clade: Asterids
- Order: Apiales
- Family: Apiaceae
- Genus: Aletes
- Species: A. humilis

Binomial name
- Aletes humilis J.M.Coult. & Rose

Species of flowering plant

Aletes humilis is a species of flowering plant in the carrot family known by the common names Colorado aletes and Larimer aletes. It is native to Colorado in the United States; it is also known from Wyoming, but there are no recent collections there.

As of December 2022, Plants of the World Online regarded Aletes as a synonym of Cymopterus, but did not provide a name in that genus for Aletes humilis, stating only that the name is a synonym.

This plant forms a mound or cushion up to 10 centimeters tall by 20 wide. The thick, leathery, bright green leaves have toothed edges. The leaves have a celery-like or "soapy" scent. The short inflorescence has yellow flowers.

This plant grows in cracks and crevices on rock outcrops and cliffs. The habitat is dry. The vegetation is a sparse mix of ponderosa pine (Pinus ponderosa) and Douglas-fir (Pseudotsuga menziesii). Other plants in the habitat include quaking aspen, fivepetal cliffbush kinnikinnick, common juniper, wax currant, littleflower alumroot, bigflower cinquefoil, mountain muhly, and needle and thread grass.

This species was first discovered in Larimer County, Colorado, in the 1890s. Today there are about 39 known occurrences.
