= Pseudosphex humilis =

Scientific classification
- Domain: Eukaryota
- Kingdom: Animalia
- Phylum: Arthropoda
- Class: Insecta
- Order: Lepidoptera
- Superfamily: Noctuoidea
- Family: Erebidae
- Subfamily: Arctiinae
- Genus: Pseudosphex
- Species: P. humilis

Binomial name
- Pseudosphex humilis (Herrich-Schäffer, 1855)

Synonyms
- Chrysostola humilis Herrich-Schäffer, [1855]

Species of moth

Pseudosphex humilis is a moth of the subfamily Arctiinae. It was described by Gottlieb August Wilhelm Herrich-Schäffer in 1855. It is found in Brazil.
