= Anolis humilis =

Conservation status
- Least Concern (IUCN 3.1)

Scientific classification
- Kingdom: Animalia
- Phylum: Chordata
- Class: Reptilia
- Order: Squamata
- Suborder: Iguania
- Family: Anolidae
- Genus: Anolis
- Species: A. humilis

Binomial name
- Anolis humilis Peters, 1863

Species of lizard

Anolis humilis, the humble anole, is a species of lizard in the family Dactyloidae. The species is found in Costa Rica, Panama, and Nicaragua.
