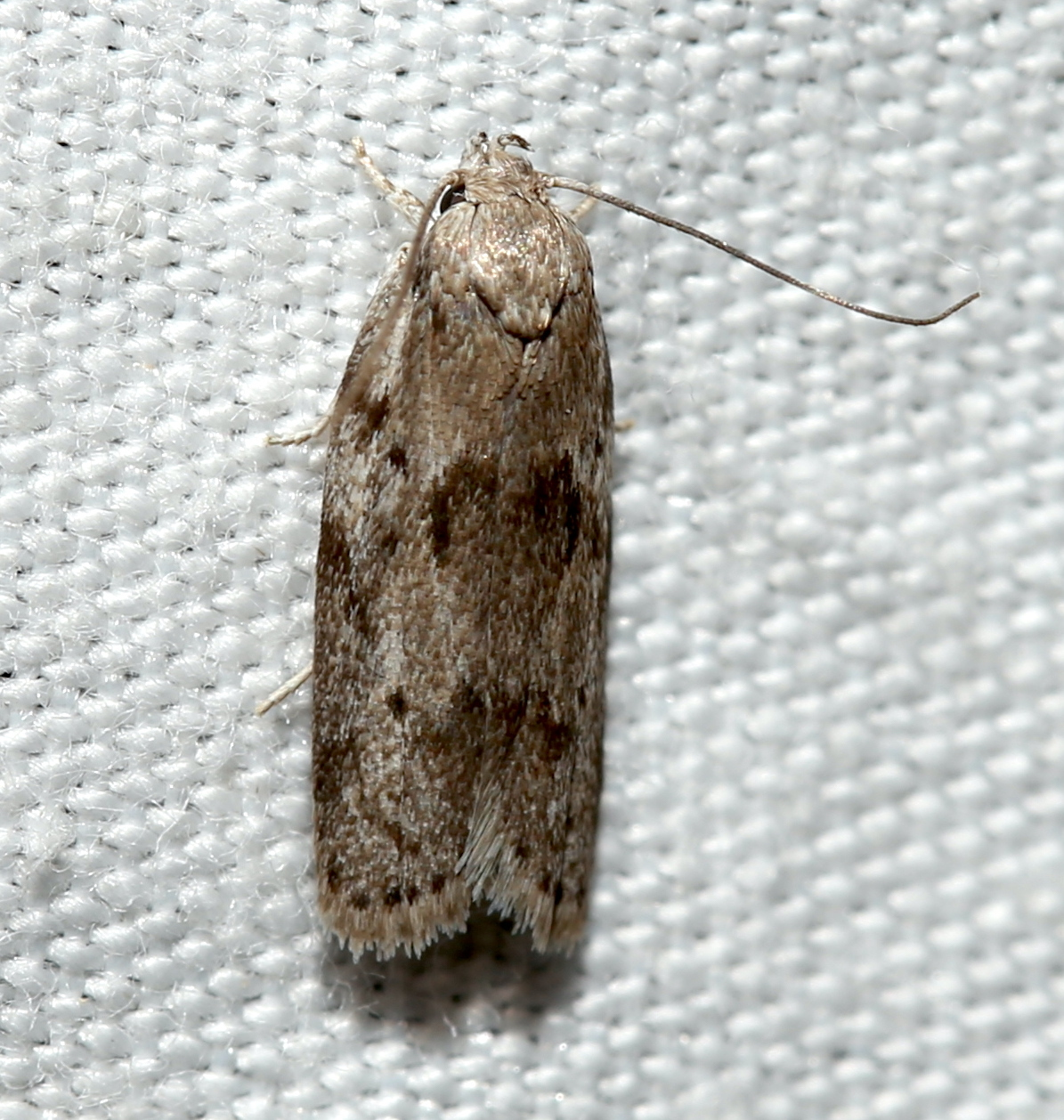

Scientific classification
- Kingdom: Animalia
- Phylum: Arthropoda
- Clade: Pancrustacea
- Class: Insecta
- Order: Lepidoptera
- Family: Depressariidae
- Genus: Antaeotricha
- Species: A. humilis

Binomial name
- Antaeotricha humilis (Zeller, 1855)

Synonyms
- Cryptolechia humilis Zeller, 1855; Cryptolechia nubeculosa Zeller, 1873; Harpalyce canusella Chambers, 1874

= Antaeotricha humilis =

Species of moth

Antaeotricha humilis, the dotted anteotricha moth, is a moth in the family Depressariidae. It was described by Philipp Christoph Zeller in 1855. It is found in North America, where it has been recorded from Alabama, Arkansas, Florida, Georgia, Illinois, Indiana, Kansas, Kentucky, Louisiana, Maryland, Mississippi, New Jersey, North Carolina, Ohio, Oklahoma, South Carolina, Tennessee, Texas, Virginia and West Virginia.

The wingspan is about 14 mm. Adults are greyish, almost white with obscure patches of very pale fuscous on the forewings. There is a small brown spot within the dorsal margin, before the middle and another a little behind it on the fold, and yet another at the end of the disc.

The larvae feed on Quercus species, tying the leaves of their host plant.
