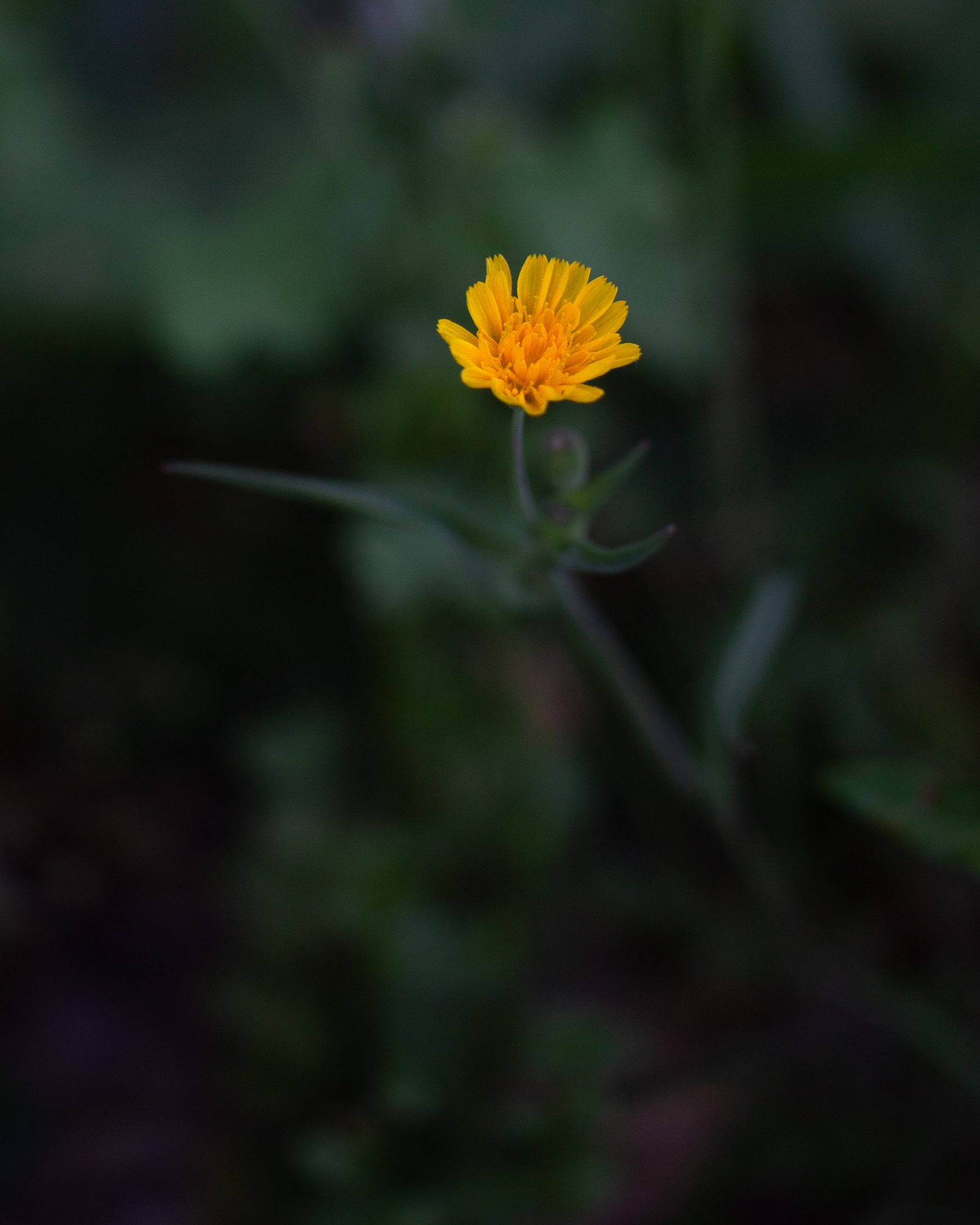
- Krigia cespitosa

Scientific classification
- Kingdom: Plantae
- Clade: Tracheophytes
- Clade: Angiosperms
- Clade: Eudicots
- Clade: Asterids
- Order: Asterales
- Family: Asteraceae
- Genus: Krigia
- Species: K. cespitosa

Binomial name
- Krigia cespitosa (Raf.) K.L.Chambers 1973

Synonyms
- Serinia cespitosa Raf.; Krigia oppositifolia Raf., not validly published; Apogon gracilis DC.; Apogon humilis Elliott; Apogon lyratum Nutt.; Apogon lyratus Nutt.; Arnoseris gracilis (DC.) Sch.Bip.; Arnoseris humilis (Elliott) Sch.Bip.; Krigia gracilis (DC.) Shinners; Krigia petiolaris Raf.; Serinia gracilis (DC.) Kuntze; Serinia oppositifolia (Raf.) Kuntze, not validly published; Serinia caespitosa Raf. 1817; Krigia caespitosa (Raf.) K.L.Chambers

= Krigia cespitosa =

Species of flowering plant

Krigia cespitosa, known as common dwarf-dandelion, opposite-leaved dwarf-dandelion, or weedy dwarfdandelion, is a North American species of plant in the family Asteraceae . It is native to northeastern Mexico (Nuevo León) and to the southeastern and south-central United States, from Florida to Texas and north as far as southeastern Nebraska, southern Illinois, and central West Virginia.

Krigia cespitosa is an annual herb up to 42 cm (16.8 inches) tall. One plant generally produces one flower head per flower stalk, each head with 12–35 yellow ray flowers but no disc flowers.
