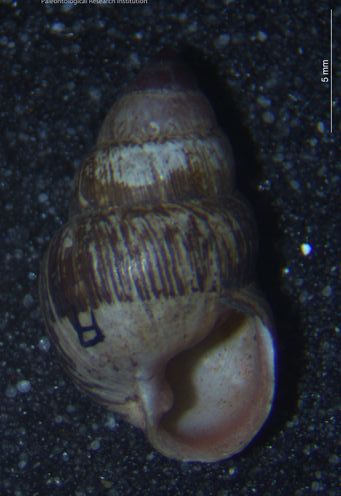
- Shell of Amastra humilis (specimen at the Paleontological Research Institute)

Scientific classification
- Kingdom: Animalia
- Phylum: Mollusca
- Class: Gastropoda
- Order: Stylommatophora
- Family: Amastridae
- Genus: Amastra
- Species: A. humilis

Binomial name
- Amastra humilis (Newcomb, 1855)

Synonyms
- Achatinella humilis Newcomb, 1855 superseded combination; Achatinella humilis L. Pfeiffer, 1856 junior subjective synonym; Amastra (Amastra) humilis (Newcomb, 1855) alternative representation

= Amastra humilis =

Species of mollusc

Amastra humilis is a species of air-breathing land snail, a terrestrial pulmonate gastropod mollusc in the family Amastridae.

Subspecies

- Amastra humilis moomomiensis Pilsbry & C. M. Cooke, 1914
- Amastra humilis sepulta Pilsbry & C. M. Cooke, 1914

== Description ==
The length of the shell attains 17.2 mm, its diameter 9 mm.

The shell is elongate-conical with prominent longitudinal striations. It contains 7 whorls. They are rounded at the upper sections, slightly flattened centrally, and the body whorl is faintly carinate along its upper margin. The suture is deep and distinct, with an acute apex. The aperture is subrounded, with a sharp lip that shows slight internal thickening. The columella is flattened and adorned with a pronounced plait. The shell is pale salmon in color, cloaked by a dense black epidermis. The columella and the inner edge of the outer lip are dark brown, contrasting with the bluish-white interior of the aperture.

The shell is not distinctly "obscurely carinated" but rather turgid below the suture, occasionally so swollen as to appear obtusely subangular. This impression is often accentuated by the wear of the cuticle on the convex regions. The purple-brown protoconch is intricately and sharply striate, characteristic of many Oahuan species.

The initial one or two neanic whorls are coated with a black or dark olive cuticle, adorned with whitish streaks and zigzag patterns that fade to a lighter hue near the upper suture. These markings are often partially worn away. The body whorl is white or faintly tinted with brown beneath a dense black cuticle, which frequently exhibits patches of wear. A bare patch in front of the aperture is common but not universally present.

The shell's interior is dull bluish-gray, accentuated by a red-brown or soft rose streak along the low callus inside the lip, which is distinctly acute. The columella exhibits a muted purplish tone and generally features a single, pale, moderate fold. Occasionally, a second, more oblique and significantly smaller fold appears above the principal one.

== Distribution ==
This species is endemic to Hawaii, occurring on Molokai island.
