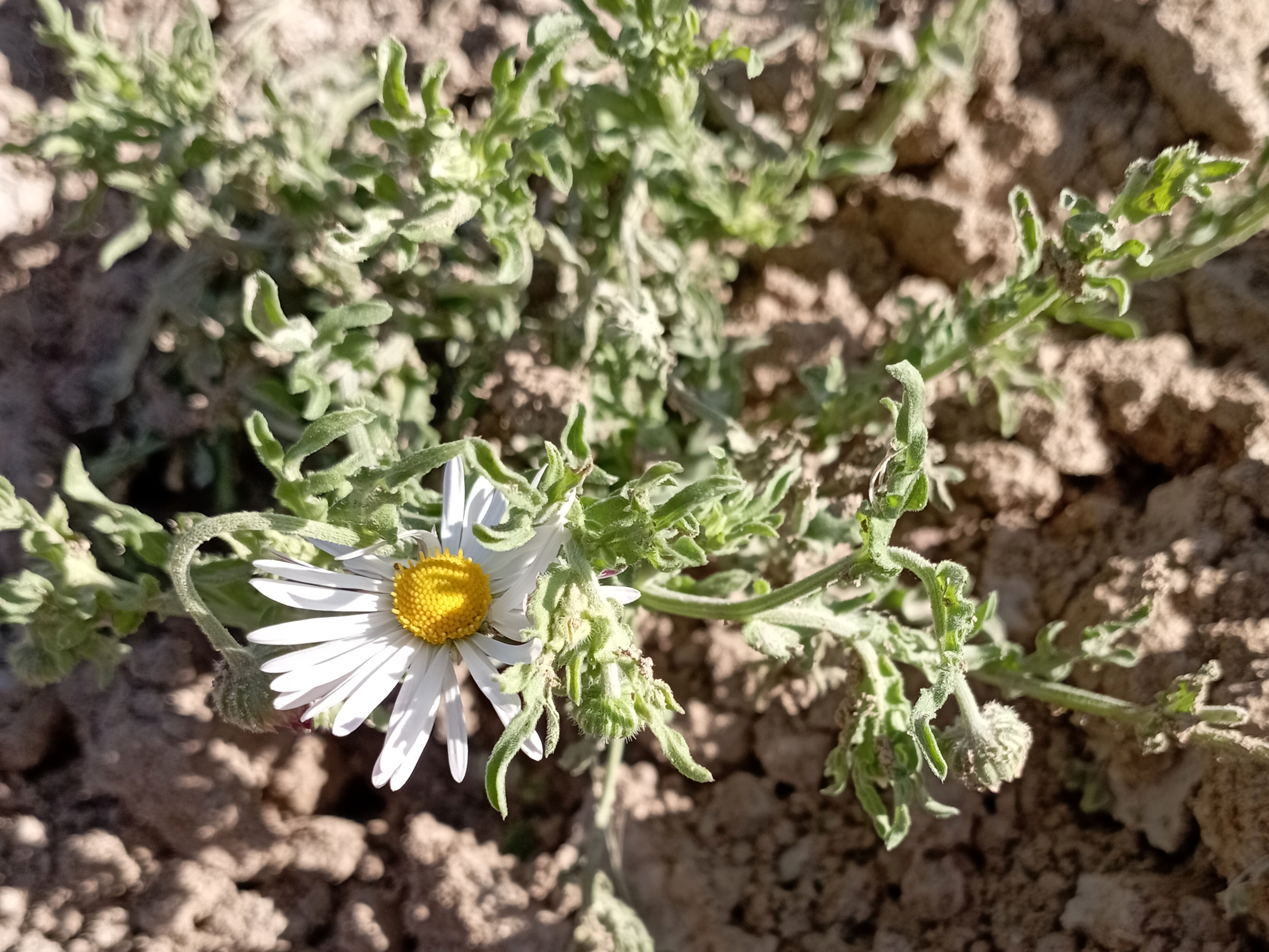
- In Dolores Hidalgo, Mexico

Scientific classification
- Kingdom: Plantae
- Clade: Tracheophytes
- Clade: Angiosperms
- Clade: Eudicots
- Clade: Asterids
- Order: Asterales
- Family: Asteraceae
- Genus: Aphanostephus
- Species: A. ramosissimus

Binomial name
- Aphanostephus ramosissimus DC.

Synonyms
- Synonymy: Egletes ramosissima (DC.) A.Gray; Aphanostephus arizonicus A.Gray, syn of var. humilis; Aphanostephus humilis (Benth.) A.Gray, syn of var. humilis; Aphanostephus potosinus Shinners, syn of var. humilis; Egletes humilis (Benth.) Torr. & A.Gray, syn of var. humilis; Leucopsidium humile Benth., syn of var. humilis; Aphanostephus ramosus (DC.) A.Gray, syn of var. ramosus; Keerlia ramosa DC., syn of var. ramosus

= Aphanostephus ramosissimus =

Species of flowering plant

Aphanostephus ramosissimus is a North American species of flowering plants in the family Asteraceae, with the common name plains lazydaisy. It is native to the southwestern and south-central United States, the states of Arizona, New Mexico, Texas, and Oklahoma, as well as to central and northern Mexico as far south as Puebla and Michoacán.

== Description ==
Aphanostephus ramosissimus is an annual herb up to 45 cm (18 inches) tall. It produces multiple flowers, each containing a few dozen long, thin, white petals that radiate from a yellow central disc.

Varieties

- Aphanostephus ramosissimus var. humilis (Benth.) B.L.Turner & Birdsong
- Aphanostephus ramosissimus var. ramosus (DC.) B.L.Turner & Birdsong
- Aphanostephus ramosissimus var. ramosissimus
