= Syncalathium =

Scientific classification
- Kingdom: Plantae
- Clade: Tracheophytes
- Clade: Angiosperms
- Clade: Eudicots
- Clade: Asterids
- Order: Asterales
- Family: Asteraceae
- Subfamily: Cichorioideae
- Tribe: Cichorieae
- Subtribe: Crepidinae
- Genus: Syncalathium; Lipsch.

Type species
- Syncalathium sukaczevii (syn. of S. kawaguchii) Lipsch.

Genus of plants

Syncalathium is a genus of Chinese plants in the tribe Cichorieae within the family Asteraceae.

== Species ==
As of May 2024, Plants of the World Online accepted the following species:

- Syncalathium chrysocephala (C.Shih) S.W.Liu – Qinghai, Tibet
- Syncalathium disciforme (Mattf.) Y.Ling – Gansu, Qinghai, Sichuan
- Syncalathium kawaguchii (Kitam.) Y.Ling – Qinghai, Tibet
- Syncalathium orbiculariforme C.Shih – Tibet, Sichuan, Yunnan
- Syncalathium porphyreum (C.Marquand & Airy Shaw) Y.Ling – Qinghai, Tibet
- Syncalathium roseum Ling – Tibet

Former species include:

- Syncalathium souliei = Melanoseris souliei (Franch.) N.Kilian
