= Mojiangia =

Scientific classification
- Kingdom: Plantae
- Clade: Tracheophytes
- Clade: Angiosperms
- Clade: Eudicots
- Clade: Asterids
- Order: Asterales
- Family: Asteraceae
- Subfamily: Cichorioideae
- Tribe: Cichorieae
- Subtribe: Crepidinae
- Genus: Mojiangia; Ze H.Wang, N.Kilian & H.Peng
- Species: M. oreophila

Binomial name
- Mojiangia oreophila Ze H.Wang, N.Kilian & H.Peng

Genus of flowering plants

Mojiangia is a genus of flowering plants in the family Asteraceae. It includes a single species, Mojiangia oreophila, which is endemic to Yunnan Province in south-central China.
