= Sinoseris =

Scientific classification
- Kingdom: Plantae
- Clade: Tracheophytes
- Clade: Angiosperms
- Clade: Eudicots
- Clade: Asterids
- Order: Asterales
- Family: Asteraceae
- Subfamily: Cichorioideae
- Tribe: Cichorieae
- Subtribe: Crepidinae
- Genus: Sinoseris

Genus of flowering plants

Sinoseris is a genus of flowering plants in the family Asteraceae. It includes three species native to south-central China.

- Sinoseris changii Ze H.Wang, N.Kilian & H.Peng
- Sinoseris muliensis (Y.S.Chen, Lian S.Xu & R.Ke) Ze H.Wang, N.Kilian & H.Peng
- Sinoseris scandens (C.C.Chang) Ze H.Wang, N.Kilian & H.Peng
