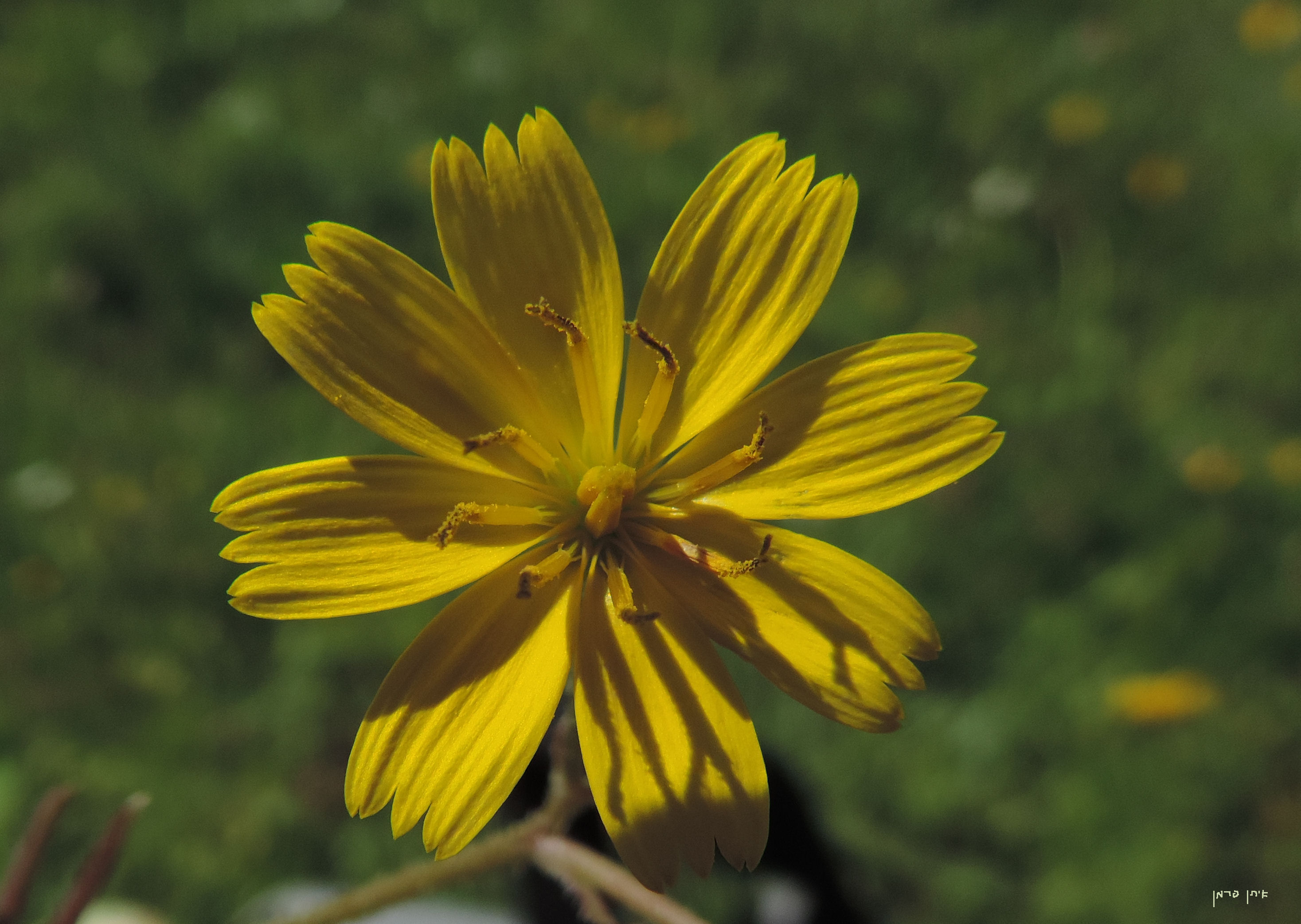
- Rhagadiolus stellatus

Scientific classification
- Kingdom: Plantae
- Clade: Tracheophytes
- Clade: Angiosperms
- Clade: Eudicots
- Clade: Asterids
- Order: Asterales
- Family: Asteraceae
- Subfamily: Cichorioideae
- Tribe: Cichorieae
- Subtribe: Crepidinae
- Genus: Rhagadiolus; Juss. 1789, conserved name not Scop. 1777 nor Zinn 1757 nor Tourn. ex Scop. 1777 nor Vaill. 1754

= Rhagadiolus =

Genus of plants

Rhagadiolus is a genus of plants in the tribe Cichorieae within the family Asteraceae, native to the Mediterranean region of southern Europe, northern Africa, and the Middle East.

Species

- Rhagadiolus edulis Gaertn. - from Portugal + Morocco to Iran
- Rhagadiolus stellatus (L.) Gaertn. - from Britain to Canary Islands + Caucasus; naturalized in California (Sonoma + Napa Counties)

formerly included

numerous species now considered better suited to other genera: Crepis Garhadiolus Hedypnois Hyoseris Koelpinia Leontodon
