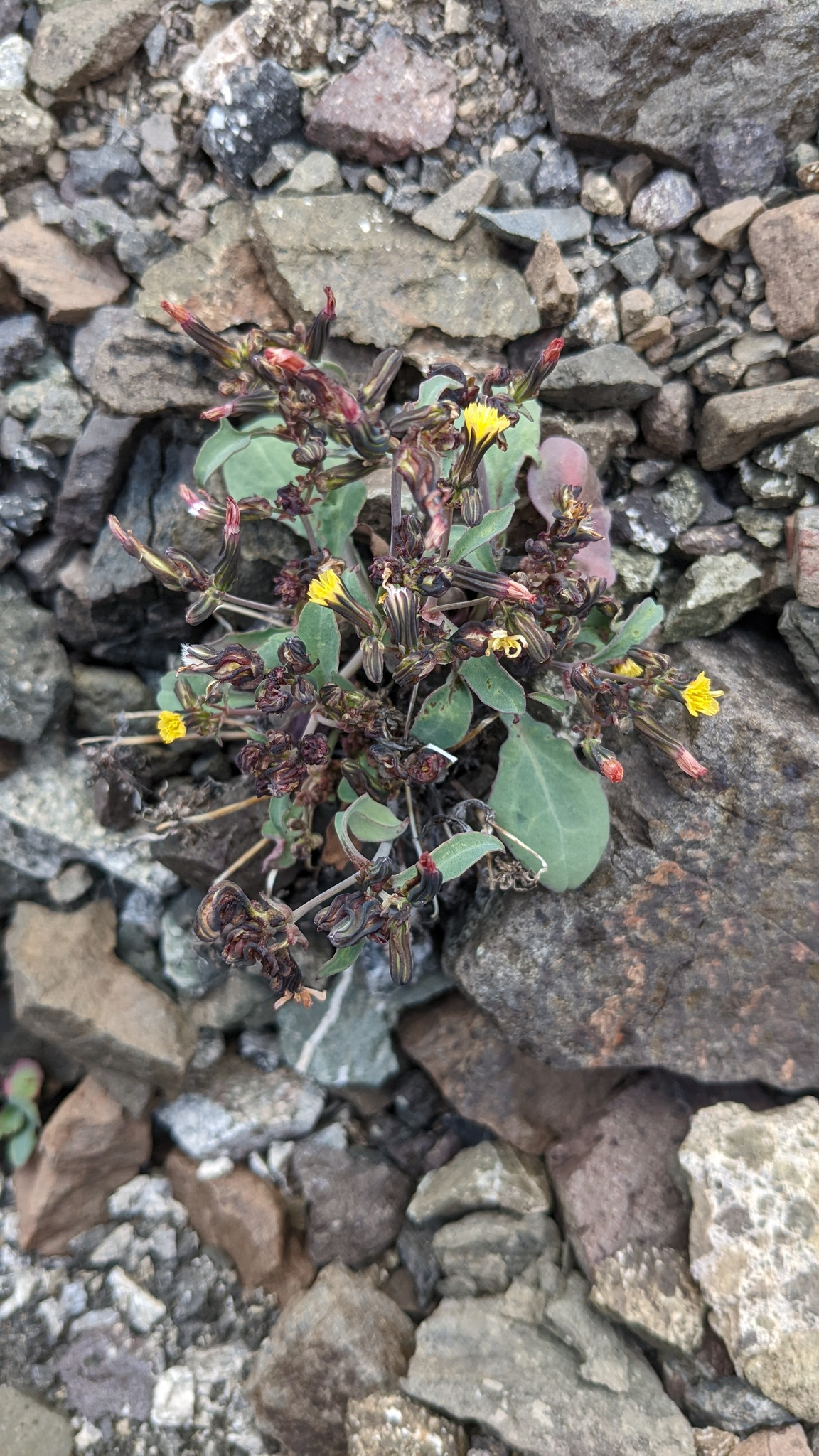
- In British Columbia

Scientific classification
- Kingdom: Plantae
- Clade: Tracheophytes
- Clade: Angiosperms
- Clade: Eudicots
- Clade: Asterids
- Order: Asterales
- Family: Asteraceae
- Genus: Askellia
- Species: A. elegans

Binomial name
- Askellia elegans (Hook.) W.A.Weber, 1984

Synonyms
- Barkhausia elegans (Hook.) Nutt.; Crepis elegans Hook.; Hieracioides elegans (Hook.) Kuntze; Youngia elegans (Hook.) Rydb.

= Askellia elegans =

Species of flowering plant

Askellia elegans, the elegant hawksbeard, is a species of North American plants in the tribe Cichorieae within the family Asteraceae. It is native to central and western Canada (Yukon, Northwest Territories, British Columbia, Alberta, Saskatchewan, Manitoba, Ontario) and the northwestern United States (Alaska, Montana, Wyoming).

Askellia elegans is a perennial up to 30 cm (12 inches) tall, with a deep taproot and large underground caudex. Stems are sometimes erect, but sometimes trailing along the ground. One plant can have more than 100 small flower heads, each with 6-10 yellow ray florets but no disc florets.
