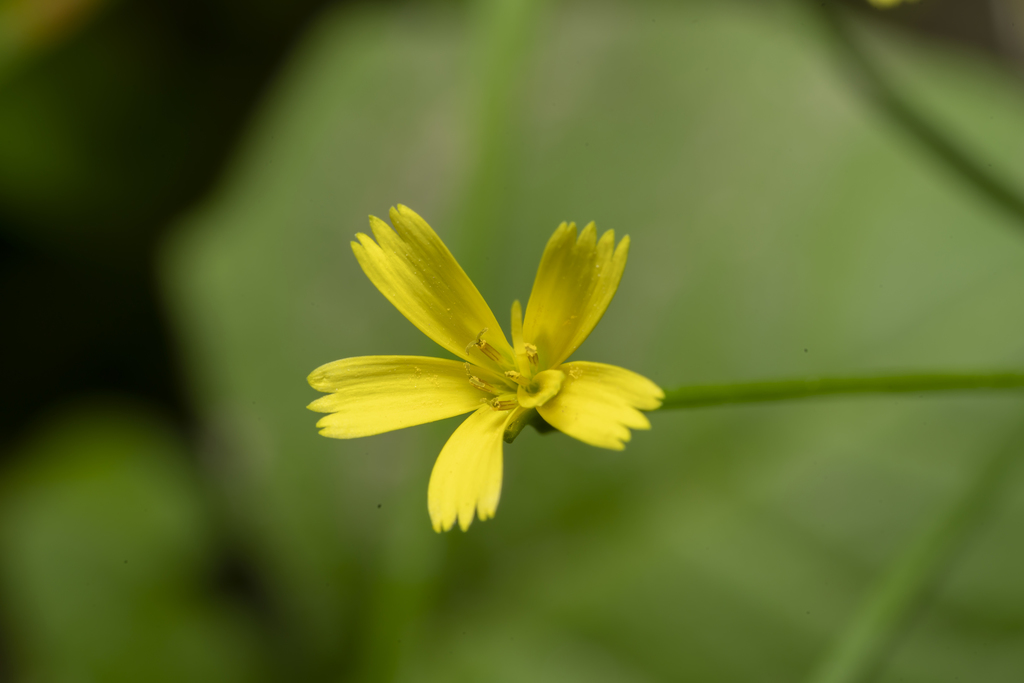

Scientific classification
- Kingdom: Plantae
- Clade: Tracheophytes
- Clade: Angiosperms
- Clade: Eudicots
- Clade: Asterids
- Order: Asterales
- Family: Asteraceae
- Genus: Rhagadiolus
- Species: R. edulis

Binomial name
- Rhagadiolus edulis (L.) Gaertn.

= Rhagadiolus edulis =

Species of plant

Rhagadioles edulis, commonly known as the edible star-hawkbit, is a species of annual herb in the family Asteraceae. It is found in Southern Europe, Northwest Africa, the Caucasus and the Middle East.

== Distribution and habitat ==
It is most commonly found in the months of April and May. It is most commonly found in France and Spain. The habitat they live in is Mediterranean maquis and forest.

== Description ==
The flower color is yellow. The flowers gender are hermaphrodite. The flower arrangement are alternate and dissected.

== Ecology ==
Puccinia rhagadioli is a fungal parasite that can live inside of the flower.
