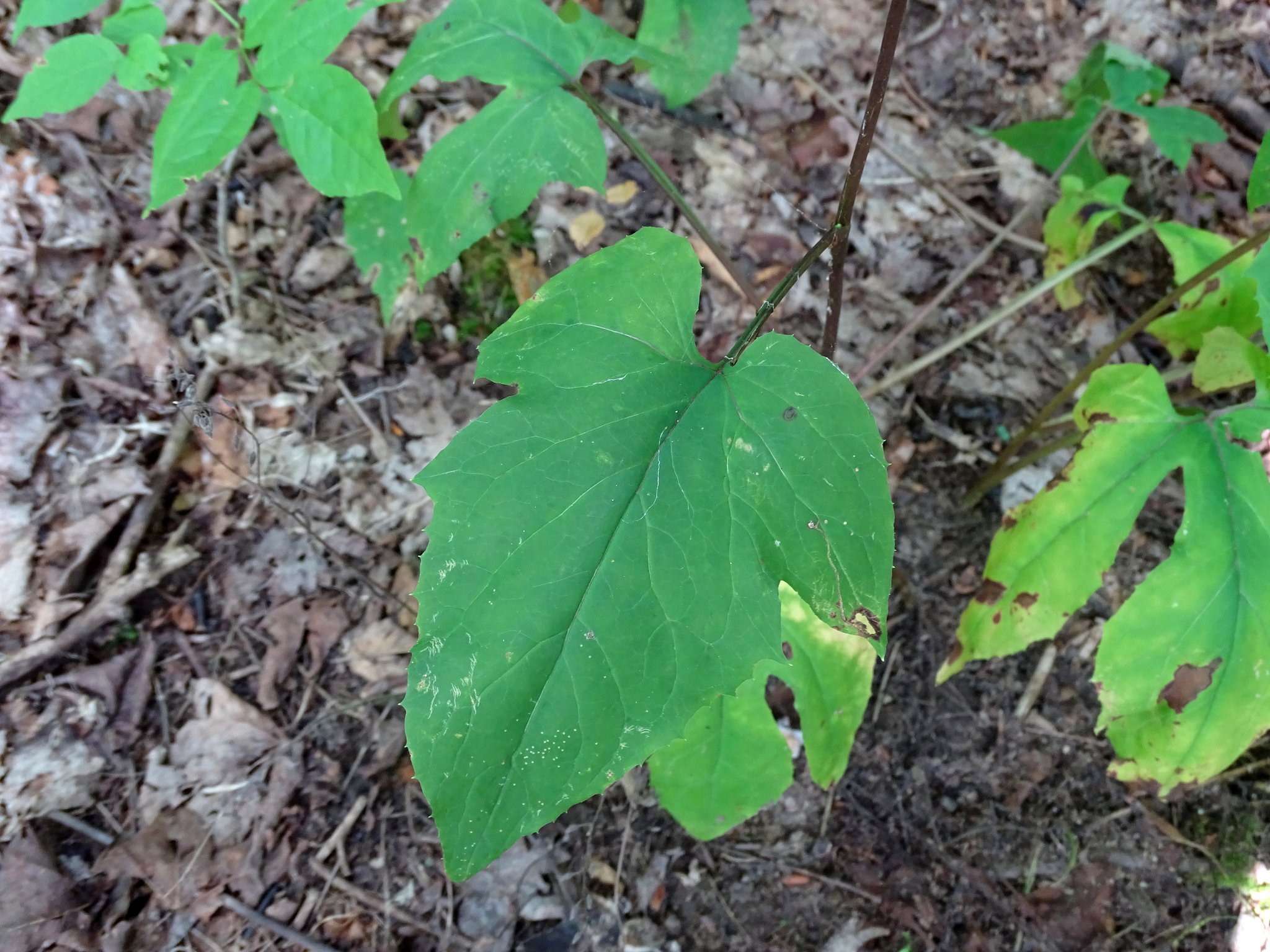

Scientific classification
- Kingdom: Plantae
- Clade: Tracheophytes
- Clade: Angiosperms
- Clade: Eudicots
- Clade: Asterids
- Order: Asterales
- Family: Asteraceae
- Genus: Nabalus
- Species: N. altissimus

Binomial name
- Nabalus altissimus (L.) Hook.

Synonyms
- Prenanthes altissima L.

= Nabalus altissimus =

Species of flowering plant

Nabalus altissimus (formerly Prenanthes altissima), commonly called the tall rattlesnakeroot or white lettuce, is a species of plant in the family Asteraceae. In 2010 it was reclassified from the genus Prenanthes to Nabalus.

== Habitat ==
This perennial grows in mesic environments including riparian zones and blooms in late summer and autumn.

== Range ==
This species occurs in the eastern United States west to Michigan, Missouri, and Texas as well as in Quebec, Canada but is unknown in Mississippi, and Florida. In Texas, it occurs in Jasper and Newton counties in the extreme southeastern part of the state.
