= Nabalus roanensis =

- Nabalus roanensis in bloom

Conservation status
- Vulnerable (NatureServe)

Scientific classification
- Kingdom: Plantae
- Clade: Tracheophytes
- Clade: Angiosperms
- Clade: Eudicots
- Clade: Asterids
- Order: Asterales
- Family: Asteraceae
- Genus: Nabalus
- Species: N. roanensis

Binomial name
- Nabalus roanensis Chickering

Synonyms
- Prenanthes roanensis (Chick.) Chick.; Prenanthes cylindrica (Small) E.L.Braun; Nabalus cylindricus Small

Species of flowering plant

Nabalus roanensis, also known as the Roan Mountain rattlesnake-root, is a species of perennial herb in the sunflower family (Asteraceae). It is endemic to high elevation forests and balds in the southern Appalachian Mountains of Tennessee, North Carolina, and Virginia.

== Taxonomy & taxonomic history ==
The specific epithet "roanensis" refers to Roan Mountain, on the summit of which the species was reported growing along the clefts of precipices in John White Chickering's original description of the species in 1880. A year later in 1881, following a merging of the genus Nabalus into the genus Pronanthes, Chickering changed the name to Pronanthes roanensis.

A 1984 study concluded that Prenanthes cylindrica should be treated as a synonym of Prenanthes roanensis. In 2011, P. roanensis was transferred back into Nabalus alongside all other North American Prenanthes following molecular phylogenetics and morphological studies supporting the separation of the two genera. A 2015 molecular study suggests that N. cylindricus (P. cylindrica) may warrant species status, pending further analysis.

== Description ==
The species grows to about five feet tall and flowers from August through September. It can be distinguished from related members in the genus by its combination of pubescent phyllaries, cylindric inflorescences, short branches, and pubescent stem.

== Conservation ==
NatureServe ranks Prenanthes roanensis (outdated synonym of Nabalus roanensis) as globally vulnerable (G3), mentioning that the species is rare across its range.
