= Sonchella =

Scientific classification
- Kingdom: Plantae
- Clade: Tracheophytes
- Clade: Angiosperms
- Clade: Eudicots
- Clade: Asterids
- Order: Asterales
- Family: Asteraceae
- Subfamily: Cichorioideae
- Tribe: Cichorieae
- Subtribe: Crepidinae
- Genus: Sonchella; Sennikov

Genus of plants

Sonchella is a genus of Asian flowering plants in the family Asteraceae.

Species

- Sonchella dentata (Ledeb.) Sennikov - Russia (Altai, Tuva), China (Qinghai), Mongolia
- Sonchella stenoma (Turcz. ex DC.) Sennikov - Russia (Buryatiya, Chita), China (Tibet, Gansu, Inner Mongolia), Mongolia
