= Lihengia =

Scientific classification
- Kingdom: Plantae
- Clade: Tracheophytes
- Clade: Angiosperms
- Clade: Eudicots
- Clade: Asterids
- Order: Asterales
- Family: Asteraceae
- Subfamily: Cichorioideae
- Tribe: Cichorieae
- Subtribe: Lactucinae
- Genus: Lihengia; Y.S.Chen & R.Ke

Species
- Lihengia amoena (Hand.-Mazz.) Y.S.Chen & R.Ke; Lihengia gombalana (Hand.-Mazz.) Y.S.Chen & R.Ke

Genus of flowering plants

Lihengia is a genus of flowering plants in the family Asteraceae. It includes two species native to subalpine regions of southern and southeastern Tibet and northwestern Yunnan province in south-central China.

- Lihengia amoena (Hand.-Mazz.) Y.S.Chen & R.Ke
- Lihengia gombalana (Hand.-Mazz.) Y.S.Chen & R.Ke

These species were formerly placed in genus Dubyaea where they constituted section Amoena. A phylogenetic and morphological analysis published in 2021 found that the two species are distinct from the other Dubyaea species, and belonged to subtribe Lactucinae rather than subtribe Crepidinae to which Dubyaea belongs. The authors described the new genus Lihengia for two species.
