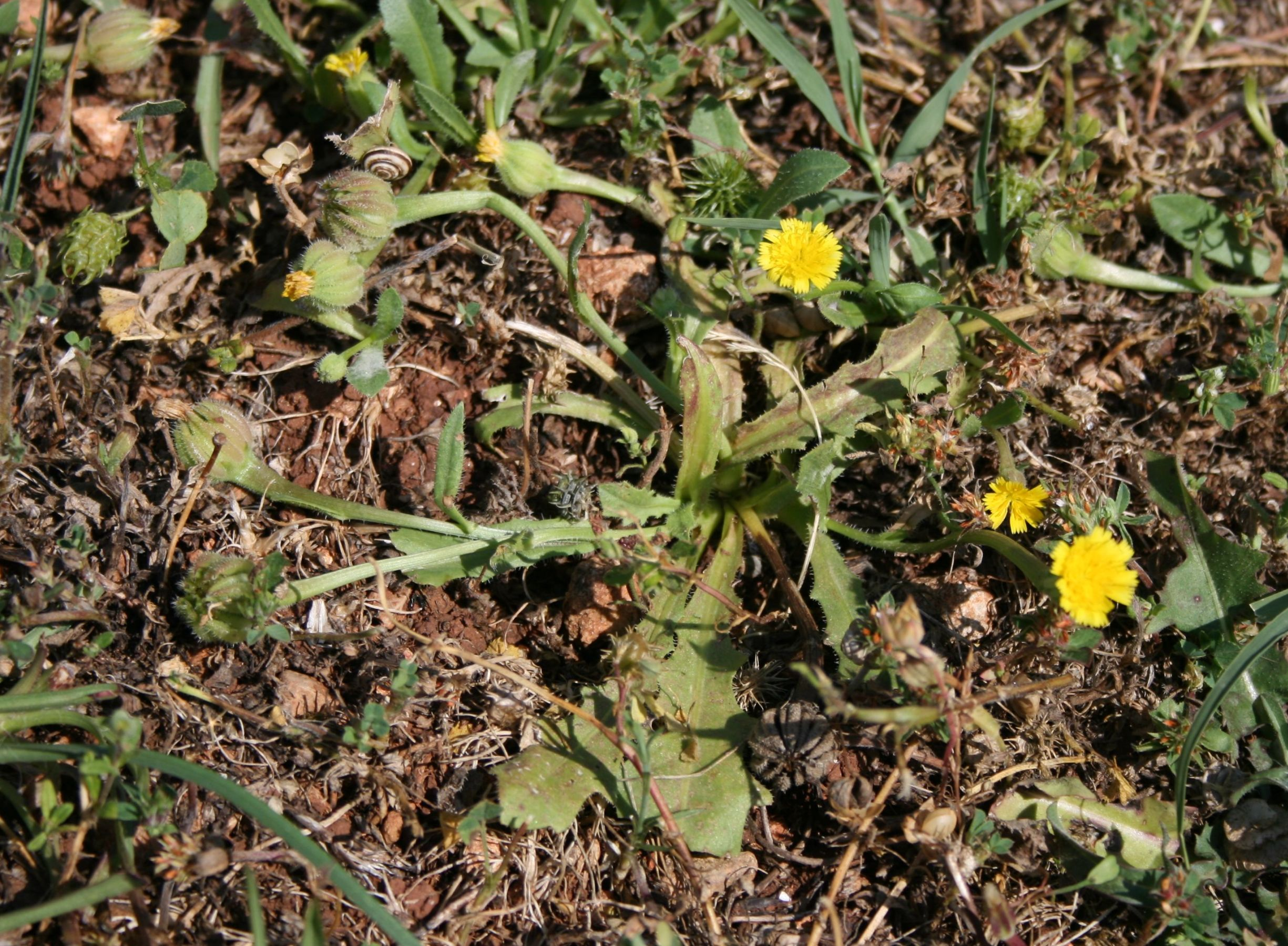
- Hedypnois rhagadioloides in Italy

Scientific classification
- Kingdom: Plantae
- Clade: Tracheophytes
- Clade: Angiosperms
- Clade: Eudicots
- Clade: Asterids
- Order: Asterales
- Family: Asteraceae
- Genus: Hedypnois
- Species: H. rhagadioloides

Binomial name
- Hedypnois rhagadioloides (L.) F.W.Schmidt 1795

Synonyms
- Synonymy: Hyoseris rhagadioloides L. 1753; Hedypnois annua Ferris; Hedypnois coronopifolia Ten.; Hedypnois crepidiformis Rchb.; Hedypnois cretica (L.) Dum.Cours.; Hedypnois furfuracea Rchb.; Hedypnois globulifera Lam.; Hedypnois hedypnois (L.) Linding.; Hedypnois mauritanica Willd.; Hedypnois monspeliensis Willd.; Hedypnois pendula Willd.; Hedypnois persica M.Bieb.; Hedypnois persica Fisch.; Hedypnois polymorpha DC.; Hedypnois pygmaea Willk.; Hedypnois sabulorum Pomel; Hedypnois tournefortii Cass.; Hyoseris cretica L.; Hyoseris hedypnois L.; Hyoseris incrassata Moench; Hyoseris mauritanica (Willd.) Pers.; Hyoseris monspeliensis Pers.; Hyoseris pendula Balb.; Hyoseris rhagadioloides L.; Hyoseris scabra Moench 1794 not L. 1753; Rhagadiolus creticus (L.) All.; Rhagadiolus hedypnois (L.) All.; Rhagadiolus pendulus (Willd.) Benth.; Rhagadiolus pendulus Benth. & Hook.f.

= Hedypnois rhagadioloides =

Cretanweed

Species of flowering plant

Hedypnois rhagadioloides, the Cretanweed or scaly hawkbit, is a species of plant in the tribe Cichorieae within the family Asteraceae. It is native to the Mediterranean Region and neighboring areas from Canary Islands to Iran, and naturalized in Australia and in parts of the Americas (southwestern United States, Baja California in Mexico, central Chile).

Hedypnois rhagadioloides is a variably hairy/hispid annual herb with flower stalks up to 40 centimeter (16 inches) stall, most of the leaves gathered around the base resembling the common dandelion except for the bristles. Leaves are green or purplish, up to 18 centimeters (7.2 inches) long. The plant produces a flower stalk with one single flower head or a flat-topped array of several heads. The head has rows of phyllaries that may be very bristly, and the head is egg-shaped when still closed. Each head contains 8-30 yellow ray flowers but no disc flowers.
