= Spiroseris =

Scientific classification
- Kingdom: Plantae
- Clade: Tracheophytes
- Clade: Angiosperms
- Clade: Eudicots
- Clade: Asterids
- Order: Asterales
- Family: Asteraceae
- Subfamily: Cichorioideae
- Tribe: Cichorieae
- Subtribe: Crepidinae
- Genus: Spiroseris; Rech.f.
- Species: S. phyllocephala

Binomial name
- Spiroseris phyllocephala Rech.f.

Species of plant

Spiroseris is a genus of Pakistani plants in the tribe Cichorieae within the family Asteraceae.

Species

The only known species is Spiroseris phyllocephala, native to Pakistan.
