= Qineryangia =

Scientific classification
- Kingdom: Plantae
- Clade: Tracheophytes
- Clade: Angiosperms
- Clade: Eudicots
- Clade: Asterids
- Order: Asterales
- Family: Asteraceae
- Tribe: Cichorieae
- Subtribe: Crepidinae
- Genus: Qineryangia; Y.S.Chen & Lian S.Xu
- Species: Q. baoxingensis

Binomial name
- Qineryangia baoxingensis Y.S.Chen & Lian S.Xu

Genus of flowering plants

Qineryangia is a genus of flowering plants in the family Asteraceae. It includes a single species, Qineryangia baoxingensis, a perennial endemic to the Hengduan Mountains in Sichuan Province of south-central China.
