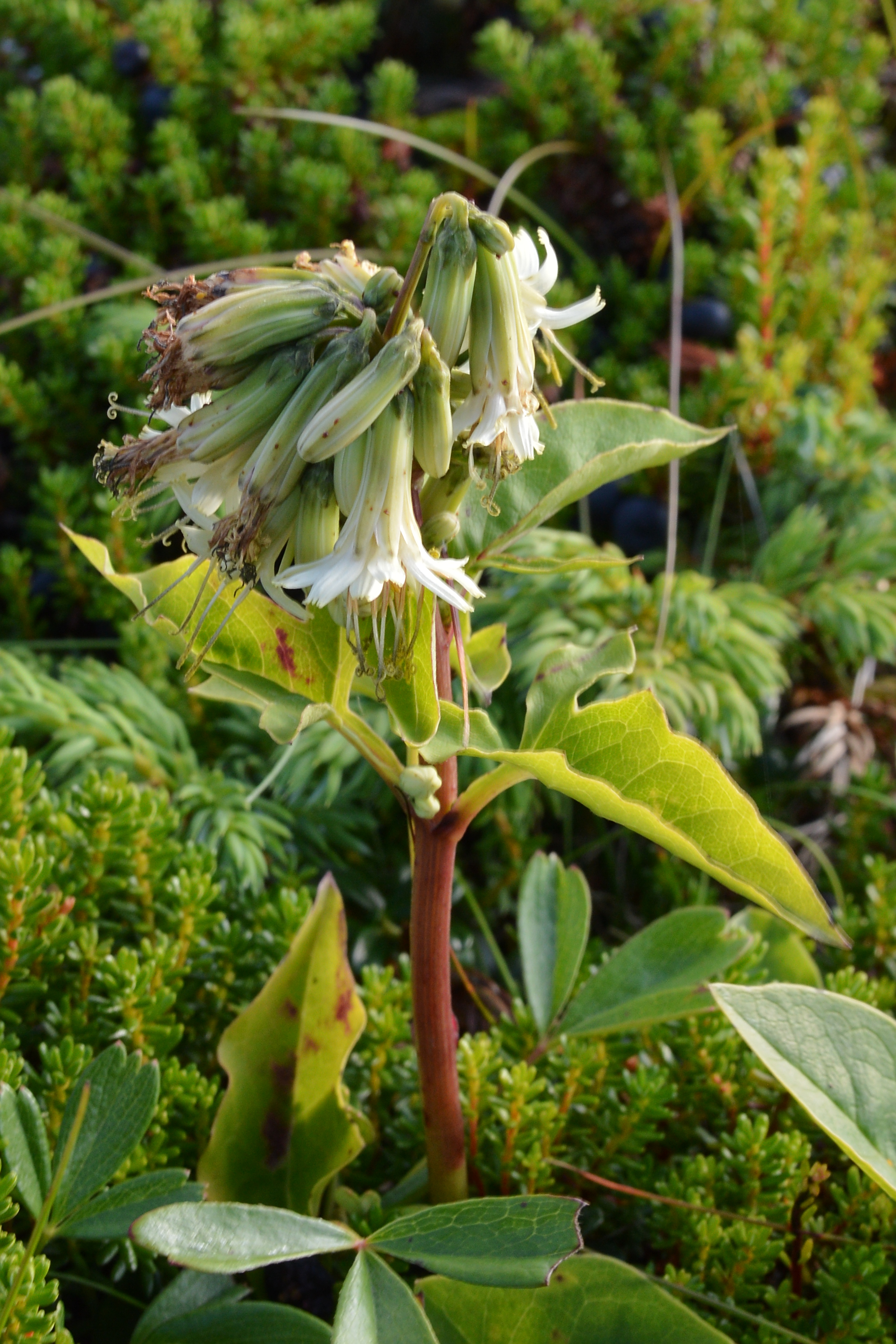
- In Newfoundland
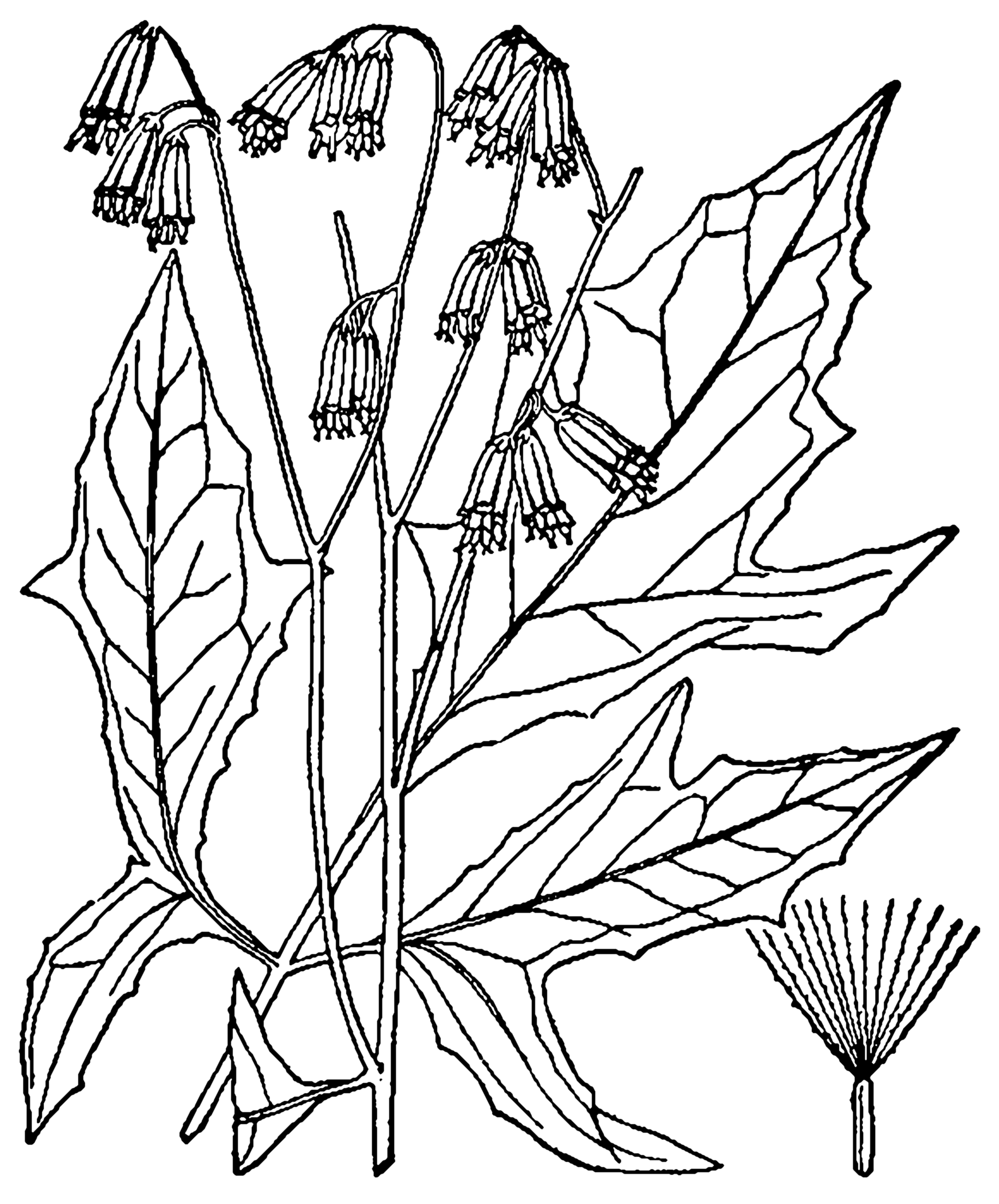
- Botanical illustration

Scientific classification
- Kingdom: Plantae
- Clade: Tracheophytes
- Clade: Angiosperms
- Clade: Eudicots
- Clade: Asterids
- Order: Asterales
- Family: Asteraceae
- Genus: Nabalus
- Species: N. trifoliolatus

Binomial name
- Nabalus trifoliolatus Cass.

Synonyms
- List: Nabalus nanus (Bigelow) DC.; Nabalus trifoliolatus var. dissectifolius Peck; Nabalus trifoliolatus var. nanus (Bigelow) Weakley; Nabalus trifoliolatus var. obovatus Burnham; Prenanthes alba var. nana Bigelow; Prenanthes nana (Bigelow) Torr. ex DC.; Prenanthes serpentaria var. nana (Bigelow) A.Gray; Prenanthes trifoliolata (Cass.) Fernald; Prenanthes trifoliolata f. ciliata Vict. & J.Rousseau; Prenanthes trifoliolata f. leptomera Sherff; Prenanthes trifoliolata var. nana (Bigelow) Fernald; Prenanthes trifoliolata f. typica Sherff

= Nabalus trifoliolatus =

Species of plant

Nabalus trifoliolatus (syn. Prenanthes trifoliolata), the gall-of-the-earth or three-leaved rattlesnake root, is a species of flowering plant in the family Asteraceae, native to eastern Canada and the eastern United States. It is a perennial reaching 5 ft (1.5 m).
