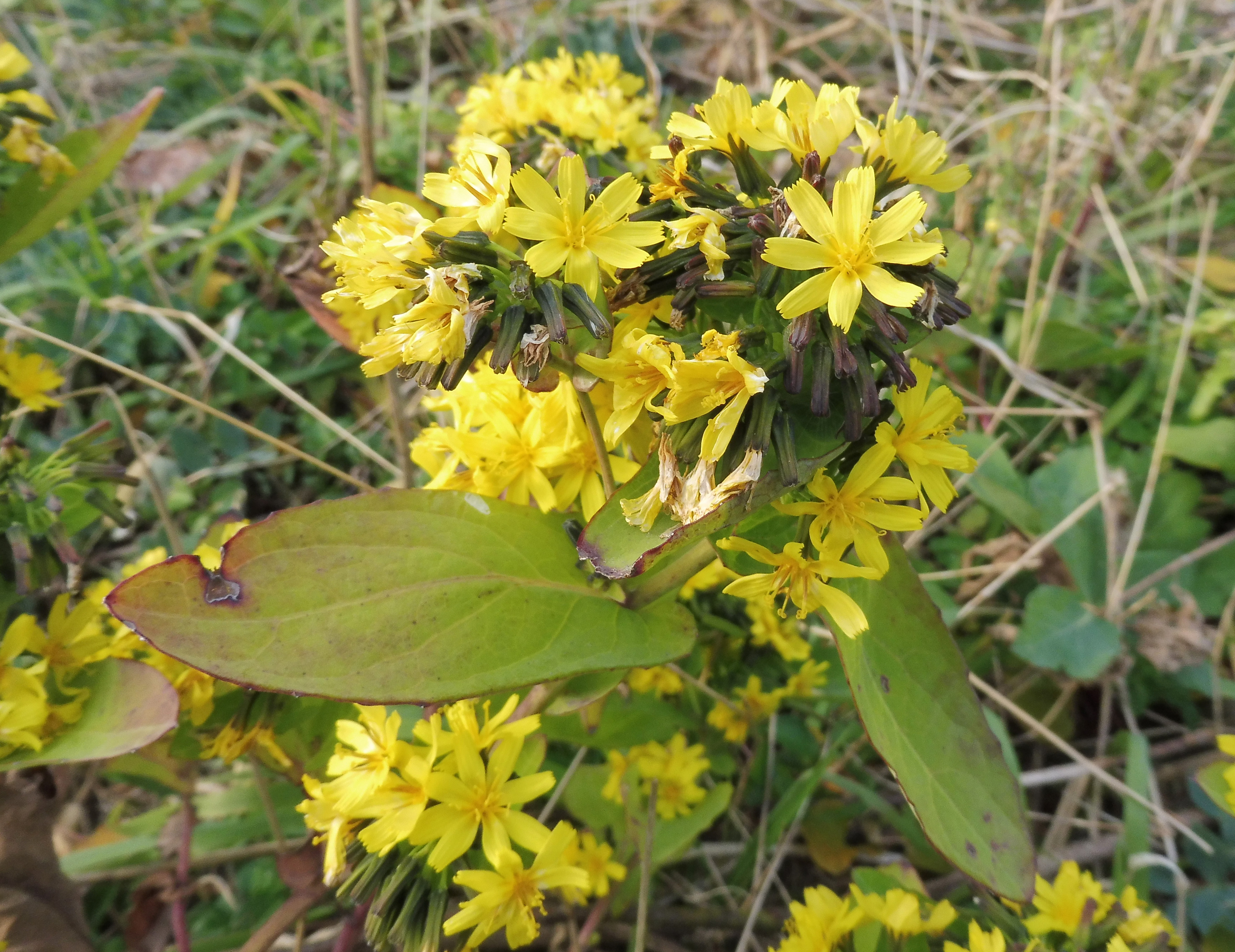

Scientific classification
- Kingdom: Plantae
- Clade: Tracheophytes
- Clade: Angiosperms
- Clade: Eudicots
- Clade: Asterids
- Order: Asterales
- Family: Asteraceae
- Genus: Crepidiastrum
- Species: C. platyphyllum

Binomial name
- Crepidiastrum platyphyllum (Franch. & Sav.) Kitam.

= Crepidiastrum platyphyllum =

Species of flowering plant

Crepidiastrum platyphyllum is a species of flowering plant in the family Asteraceae. It is native to South Korea and Japan. It is the northernmost member of its genus. In Japan, it is found along the Pacific Coast in the Chiba, Kanagawa, and Shizouka prefectures, and in Tokyo. Its natural habitat is on rocky or sandy seashores, where it is adapted for dry, sunny conditions.

Crepidiastrum platyphyllum is a perennial species that produces yellows heads of flowers in late summer and fall. It is similar to Crepidiastrum lanceolatum, but can be differentiated by its larger basal leaves and wide, thick cauline leaves.
