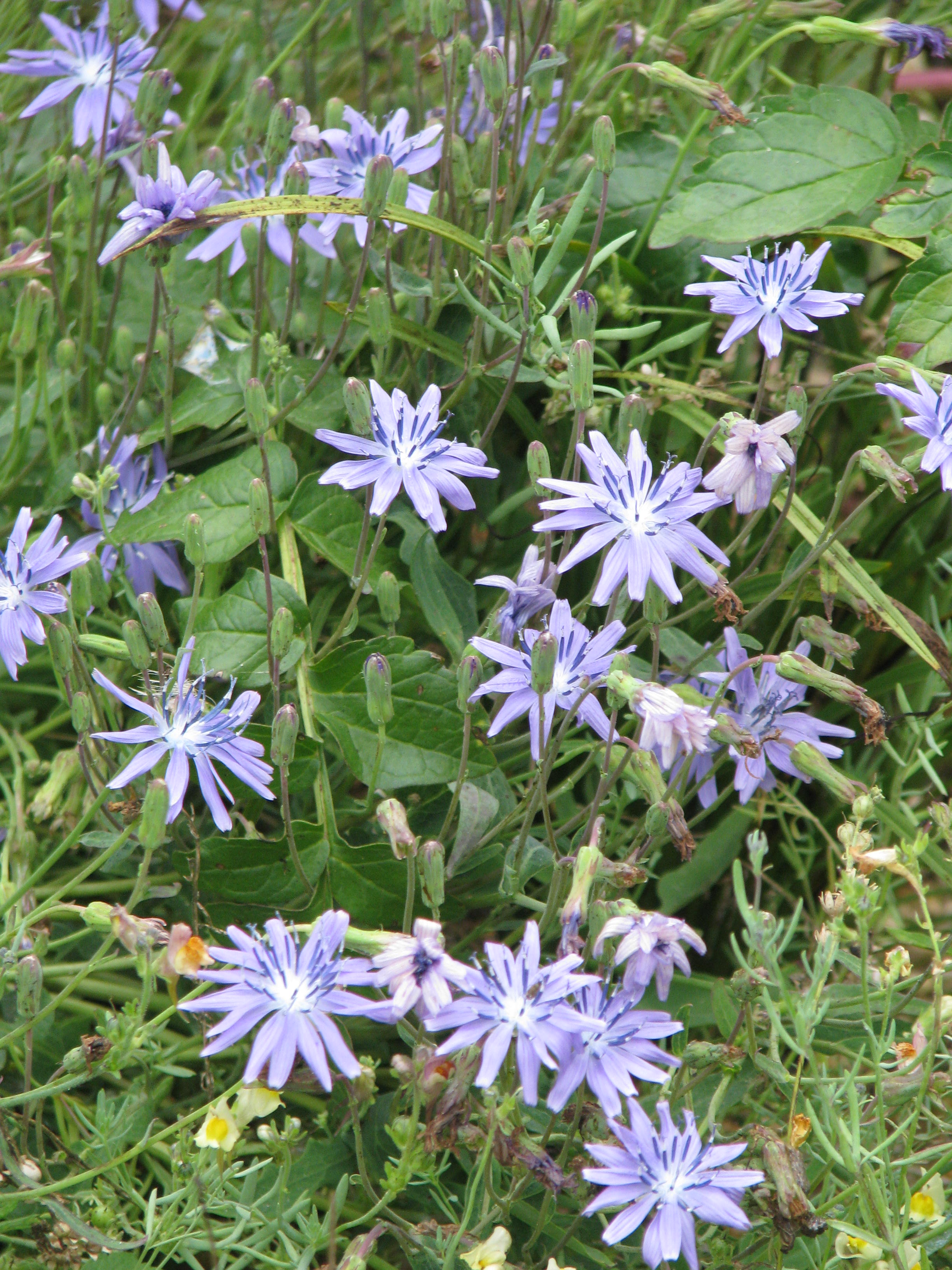
- Melanoseris macrorhiza

Scientific classification
- Kingdom: Plantae
- Clade: Embryophytes
- Clade: Tracheophytes
- Clade: Angiosperms
- Clade: Eudicots
- Clade: Asterids
- Order: Asterales
- Family: Asteraceae
- Subfamily: Cichorioideae
- Tribe: Cichorieae
- Genus: Melanoseris; Decne.

Synonyms
- Chaetoseris C.Shih; Parasyncalathium J.W.Zhang, Boufford & H.Sun; Stenoseris C.Shih; Zollikoferiastrum (Kirp.) Kamelin

= Melanoseris =

Genus of flowering plants

Melanoseris is a genus of flowering plants belonging to the family Asteraceae.

Its native range is Iran to Southern Central China and Northern Central Indo-China, Java.

== Species ==
Species:

- Melanoseris aitchisoniana (Beauverd) Ghafoor, Qaiser & Roohi Bano
- Melanoseris astorensis (Roohi Bano & Qaiser) Ghafoor, Qaiser & Roohi Bano
- Melanoseris atropurpurea (Franch.) N.Kilian & Ze H.Wang
- Melanoseris beesiana (Diels) N.Kilian
- Melanoseris bonatii (Beauverd) Ze H.Wang
- Melanoseris bracteata (Hook.f. & Thomson ex C.B.Clarke) N.Kilian
- Melanoseris brunoniana (Wall. ex DC.) N.Kilian & Ze H.Wang
- Melanoseris ciliata (C.Shih) N.Kilian
- Melanoseris cyanea (D.Don) Edgew.
- Melanoseris decipiens (C.B.Clarke) N.Kilian & Ze H.Wang
- Melanoseris dolichophylla (C.Shih) Ze H.Wang
- Melanoseris filicina (Stebbins) N.Kilian
- Melanoseris gilgitensis (Roohi Bano & Qaiser) Ghafoor, Qaiser & Roohi Bano
- Melanoseris graciliflora (DC.) N.Kilian
- Melanoseris henryi (Dunn) N.Kilian
- Melanoseris hirsuta (C.Shih) N.Kilian
- Melanoseris jilongensis Ze H.Wang & H.Peng
- Melanoseris kashmiriana (Mamgain & R.R.Rao) N.Kilian
- Melanoseris lahulensis (Mamgain & R.R.Rao) N.Kilian
- Melanoseris leiolepis (C.Shih) N.Kilian & J.W.Zhang
- Melanoseris leptantha (C.Shih) N.Kilian
- Melanoseris lessertiana (DC.) Decne.
- Melanoseris likiangensis (Franch.) N.Kilian & Ze H.Wang
- Melanoseris macrantha (C.B.Clarke) N.Kilian & J.W.Zhang
- Melanoseris macrocephala (C.Shih) N.Kilian & J.W.Zhang
- Melanoseris macrorhiza (Royle) N.Kilian
- Melanoseris monocephala (C.C.Chang) Ze H.Wang
- Melanoseris pectiniformis (C.Shih) N.Kilian & J.W.Zhang
- Melanoseris pendryi D.Maity & Khuroo
- Melanoseris polyclada (Boiss.) Akhani, N.Kilian & Sennikov
- Melanoseris qinghaica (S.W.Liu & T.N.Ho) N.Kilian & Ze H.Wang
- Melanoseris rhombiformis (C.Shih) N.Kilian & Ze H.Wang
- Melanoseris sichuanensis (C.Shih) N.Kilian
- Melanoseris souliei (Franch.) N.Kilian
- Melanoseris stewartii (Roohi Bano & Qaiser) Ghafoor, Qaiser & Roohi Bano
- Melanoseris taliensis (C.Shih) N.Kilian & Ze H.Wang
- Melanoseris tenuis (C.Shih) N.Kilian
- Melanoseris violifolia (Decne.) N.Kilian
- Melanoseris yunnanensis (C.Shih) N.Kilian & Ze H.Wang
