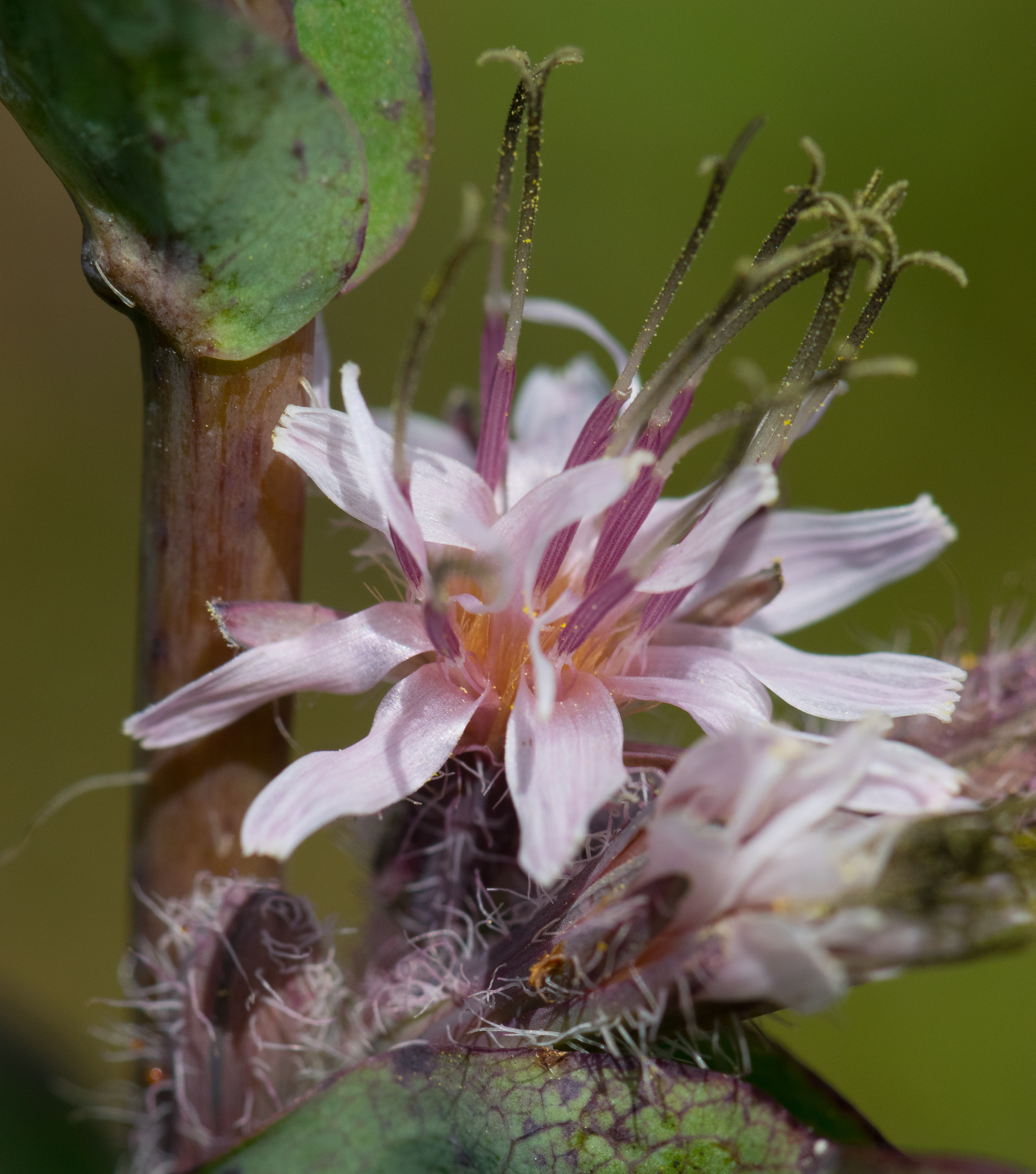

Conservation status
- Secure (NatureServe)

Scientific classification
- Kingdom: Plantae
- Clade: Tracheophytes
- Clade: Angiosperms
- Clade: Eudicots
- Clade: Asterids
- Order: Asterales
- Family: Asteraceae
- Genus: Nabalus
- Species: N. racemosus

Binomial name
- Nabalus racemosus (Michx.) Hook.

Synonyms
- Chondrilla racemosa (Michx.) Poir.; Harpalyce racemosa (Michx.) D.Don; Prenanthes racemosa Michx.

= Nabalus racemosus =

Plant species in the daisy family

Nabalus racemosus, glaucous white lettuce, is a North American species associated with wet habitats such as streamsides, bogs, and moist parries. It is part of the large and diverse daisy family.

== Description ==
Nabalus racemosus is a herbaceous plant that will be 30 to 175 centimeters (1 to 5.5 ft) tall when full grown. It is a perennial plant that grows from a large taproot that tapers at both top and bottom and is tuberous.

The leaves are hairless and glaucous, covered in natural waxes making them pale gray or blue-green. The lowermost leaves can measure 7 to 40 centimeters long and 1.5 to 10 cm wide. The petioles, leaf stems, attaching the leaves to the plant are extended on both sides and the shape of the leaves is oblanceolate to spatulate, like a reversed spearhead or spoon shaped. The basal leaves, those attached directly to the base of the plant, have petioles while those further up the stem are attach directly to the main stem and partly clasp it.

The stems grow straight upward and can be green or light purple in color. They are unbranched and are both hairless and glaucus towards the base but hispid, covered in bristly hairs, towards the top.

The flowers are small, pale pink to light purple in color. The flower head will have nine to twenty-five flowers that will either nod or be partly upright. Even when not in bloom the long hairs are quite noticeable.

== Taxonomy ==
Nabalus racemosus is a species in the family Asteraceae. It was scientifically described and named Prenanthes racemosa by André Michaux in 1803. The botanist William Jackson Hooker proposed moving it to genus Nabalus in 1833. As recently as 2006 the name Prenanthes racemosa continued to be used for the species in scientific publications. Nabalus racemosus is the correct name according to Plants of the World Online, World Plants, and World Flora Online.

=== Names ===
In English it is known by many common names including glaucous white lettuce, smooth white lettuce, glaucous rattlesnakeroot, or purple rattlesnakeroot.

== Range and habitat ==
Its native range stretches across much of northern North America. It was found in every province from Newfoundland to British Columbia in Canada with the exception of Prince Edward Island. In the northern states of the US its distribution is centered on the Midwest. To the west it is native to the Rocky Mountain states of Colorado, Wyoming, and Montana, as well as Washington state. To the east it is or was formerly found in Pennsylvania, New Jersey, New York, Vermont and Maine.

It is associated with water rich habitats such as stream banks, moist parries, alpine bogs, and wet meadows. Towards the north of its range it associates with calcicolous bogs.

=== Conservation ===
The non-profit NatureServe evaluated Nabalus racemosus in 2016 and rated it as secure (G5). At the local level they also rated it as secure in Ontario. They also found it to be apparenty secure (S4) in Manitoba, Quebec, and Saskatchewan. In Alberta, New Brunswick, Maine, Iowa, and Ohio they rate it as vulnerable (S3) and imperiled (S2) in Wyoming. It is critically imperiled (S1) on the island of Newfoundland, in Nova Scotia, and Kentucky. It is possibly locally extinct in British Columbia, Missouri, New Jersey, and Pennsylvania and likewise presumed extirpated from New York. The rest of its range has not been evaluated at the local level.
