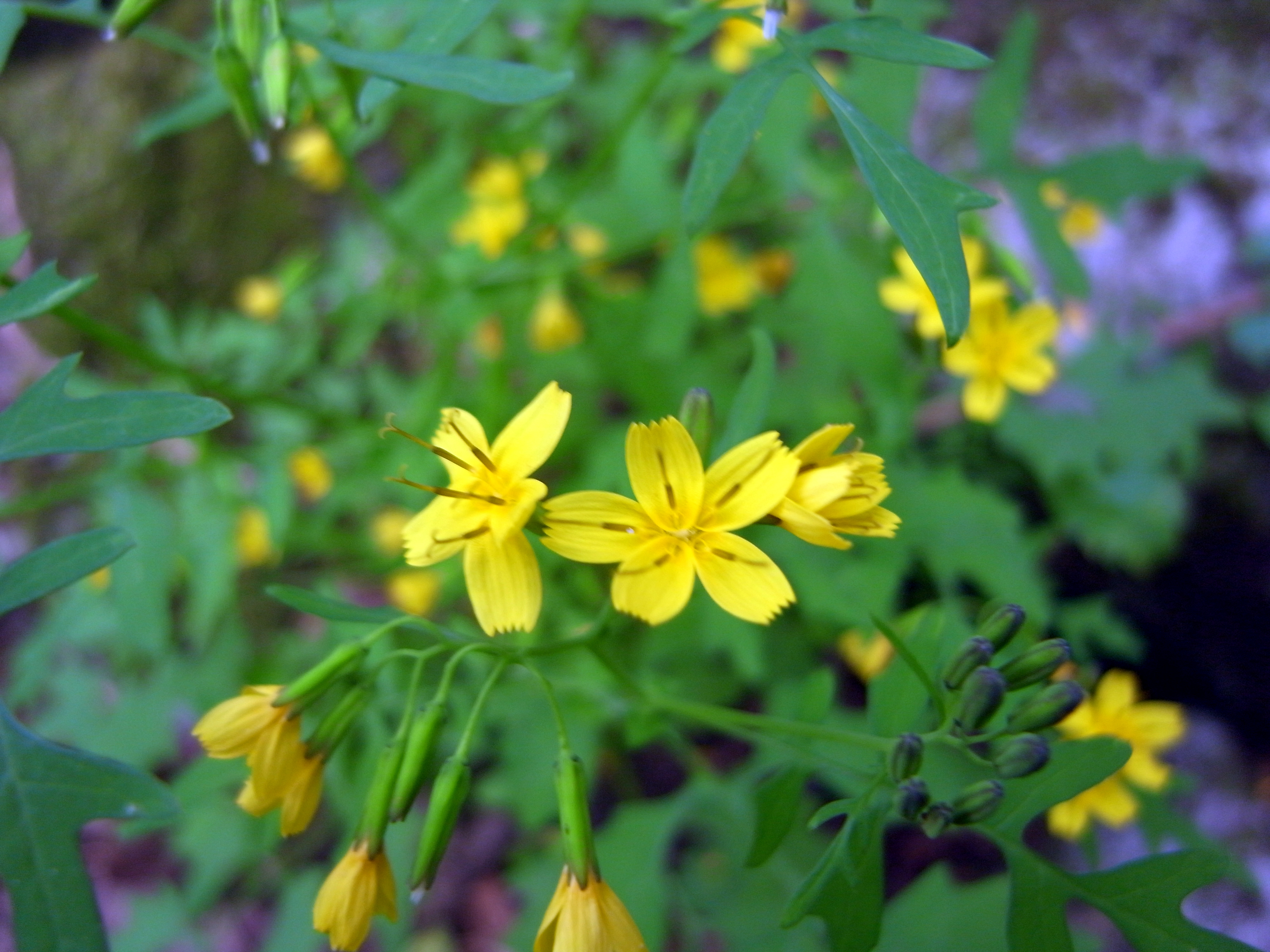
- Crepidiastrum chelidoniifolium

Scientific classification
- Kingdom: Plantae
- Clade: Tracheophytes
- Clade: Angiosperms
- Clade: Eudicots
- Clade: Asterids
- Order: Asterales
- Family: Asteraceae
- Subfamily: Cichorioideae
- Tribe: Cichorieae
- Subtribe: Crepidinae
- Genus: Crepidiastrum; Nakai

Type species
- Crepidiastrum lanceolatum (M.Houttuyn) T.Nakai

Synonyms
- × Crepidiastrixeris Kitam.; Paraixeris Nakai

= Crepidiastrum =

Genus of flowering plants

Crepidiastrum is an Asian genus of flowering plants in the family Asteraceae.

Species

- Crepidiastrum ameristophyllum (Nakai) Nakai
- Crepidiastrum chelidoniifolium (Makino) Pak & Kawano
- Crepidiastrum daitoense Tawada
- Crepidiastrum denticulatum (Houtt.) Pak & Kawano
- Crepidiastrum grandicollum (Koidz.) Nakai
- Crepidiastrum humifusum (Dunn) Sennikov
- Crepidiastrum keiskeanum (Maxim.) Nakai
- Crepidiastrum koidzumianum (Kitam.) Pak & Kawano
- Crepidiastrum lanceolata
- Crepidiastrum lanceolatum (Houtt.) Nakai
- Crepidiastrum linguifolium (A.Gray) Nakai
- Crepidiastrum muratagenii H.Ohashi & K.Ohashi
- Crepidiastrum × nakaii H.Ohashi & K. Ohashi
- Crepidiastrum platyphyllum (Franch. & Sav.) Kitam.
- Crepidiastrum saxatile (A.I.Baranov) Pak & Kawano
- Crepidiastrum semiauriculatum N.Yamam. & H.Ikeda
- Crepidiastrum sonchifolium (Maxim.) Pak & Kawano
- Crepidiastrum surugense (Hisauti) Yonek.
- Crepidiastrum taiwanianum Nakai
- Crepidiastrum yoshinoi (Makino) Pak & Kawano
