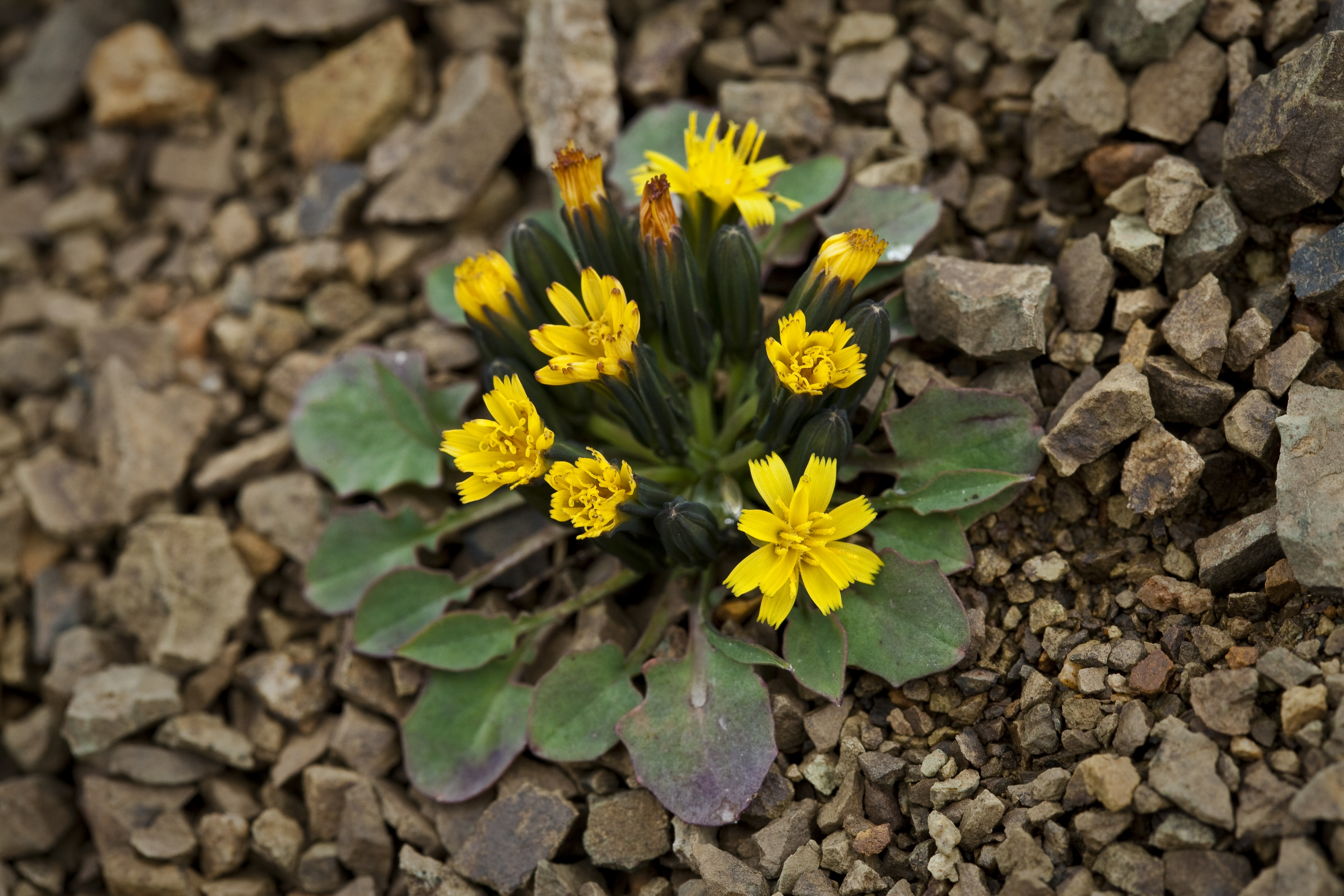

Scientific classification
- Kingdom: Plantae
- Clade: Embryophytes
- Clade: Tracheophytes
- Clade: Angiosperms
- Clade: Eudicots
- Clade: Asterids
- Order: Asterales
- Family: Asteraceae
- Subfamily: Cichorioideae
- Tribe: Cichorieae
- Subtribe: Crepidinae
- Genus: Askellia; W.A.Weber

Synonyms
- Crepis sect. Ixeridopsis Babcock

= Askellia =

Genus of flowering plants

Askellia is a genus of Asian and North American plants in the tribe Cichorieae within the family Asteraceae.

Species

- Askellia alaica (Krasch.) W.A.Weber - Tajikistan, Kyrgyzstan
- Askellia benthamii (C.B.Clarke) Sennikov - Jammu, Kashmir
- Askellia corniculata (Regel & Schmalh.) W.A.Weber - Tajikistan, Kyrgyzstan, Afghanistan, Pakistan, Jammu, Kashmir
- Askellia elegans (Hook.) W.A.Weber - Canada, United States (Alaska Montana Wyoming)
- Askellia flexuosa (Ledeb.) W.A.Weber - Tuva, Xinjiang, Mongolia, Inner Mongolia, Tibet, Qinghai, Gansu, Shanxi, Kazakhstan, Tajikistan, Kyrgyzstan, Afghanistan, Iran, Pakistan, Jammu, Kashmir, Uttar Pradesh, Himachal Pradesh
- Askellia jacutica (Lomon.) Sennikov - Yakutskiya
- Askellia karelinii (Popov & Schischk. ex Popov & Schischk.) W.A.Weber - Altay, Kyrgyzstan, Kazakhstan, Tibet, Xinjiang
- Askellia lactea (Lipsch.) W.A.Weber - Tibet, Tajikistan
- Askellia naniformis (Babc.) Sennikov - Himachal Pradesh, Jammu, Kashmir
- Askellia pseudonaniformis (C.Shih) Sennikov - Xinjiang
- Askellia pygmaea (Ledeb.) Sennikov - Siberia, Russian Far East, Tibet, Xinjiang, Mongolia, Kazakhstan, Canada, western United States (Alaska Washington Oregon California Nevada Idaho Utah Montana Wyoming)
- Askellia sogdiana (Krasch.) W.A.Weber - Tajikistan, Kyrgyzstan
