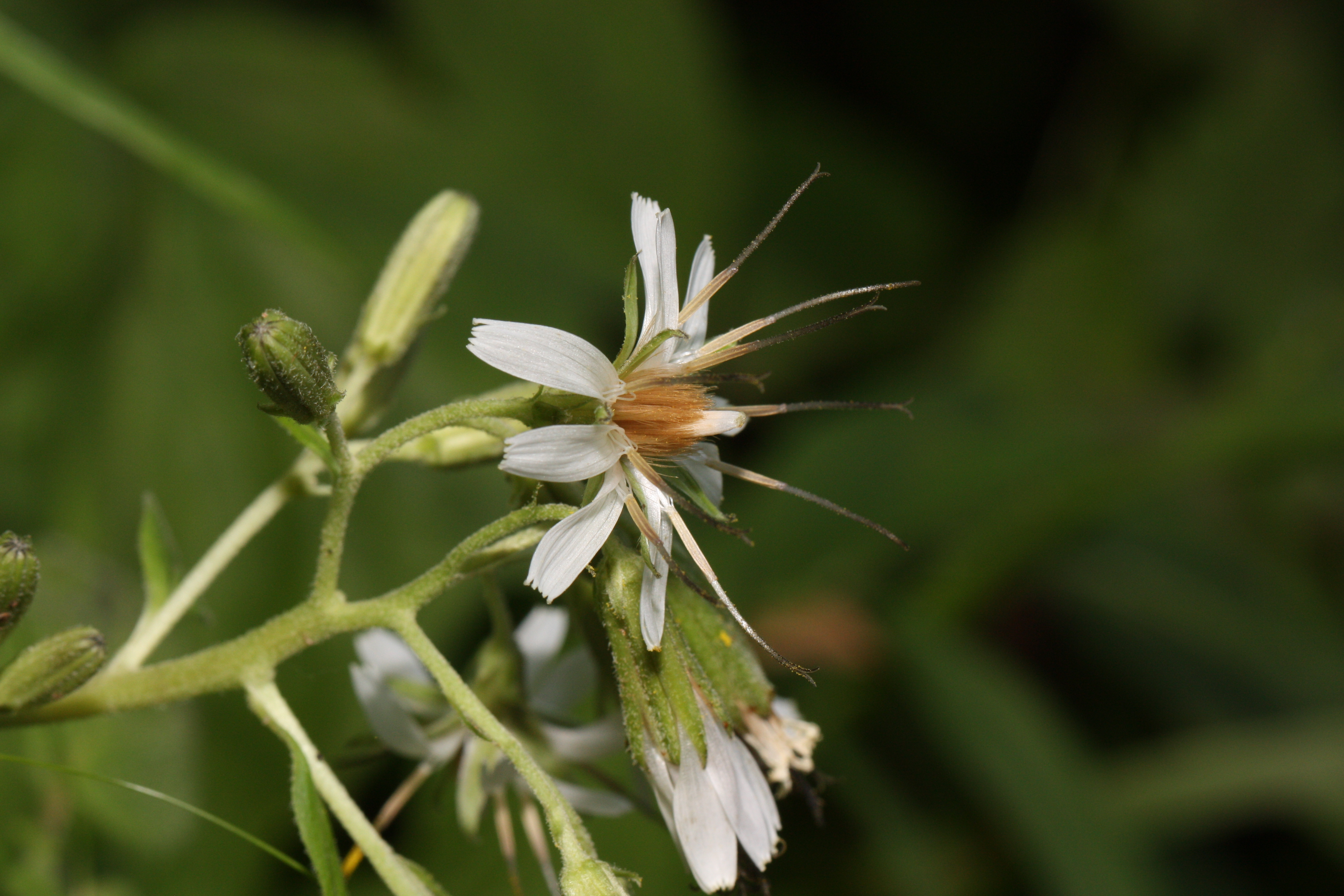
- Nabalus alatus

Scientific classification
- Kingdom: Plantae
- Clade: Tracheophytes
- Clade: Angiosperms
- Clade: Eudicots
- Clade: Asterids
- Order: Asterales
- Family: Asteraceae
- Subfamily: Cichorioideae
- Tribe: Cichorieae
- Subtribe: Crepidinae
- Genus: Nabalus; Cass.

Type species
- Nabalus trifoliolatus Cass.

= Nabalus =

Genus of flowering plants

Nabalus is a genus of Asian and North American flowering plants in the tribe Cichorieae within the family Asteraceae.

Nabalus is now considered the correct name for a group of plants in North America that were formerly considered to be members of Prenanthes, and were included in that genus in the Flora of North America treatment. Common names for the genus include "rattlesnake root" and "white lettuce." The latter reflects its close relationship to lettuce (Lactuca sativa) but having flowers that are whitish or purplish-white in some species. Many (perhaps all) of the species are monocarpic perennials, in which an individual plant may live for multiple years in a vegetative condition but then will die after flowering and fruiting.

== Species ==
As of September 2026, Nabalus species include:

=== Asian Nabalus species ===
- Nabalus acerifolius Maxim. (1871) - Japan
- Nabalus ochroleucus Maxim. (1871) - Primorye, Jilin, Korea, Japan
- Nabalus tatarinowii (Maxim.) Nakai (1923) - China, Primorye, Korea
  - Nabalus tatarinowii subsp. macranthus (Stebbins) N.Kilian - China, Mongolia
  - Nabalus tatarinowii subsp. tatarinowii - China, Mongolia, Korea, Manchuria, Primorye

=== North American Nabalus species ===
- Nabalus albus (L.) Hook. (1833) - white rattlesnake root - SAS MAN ONT QUE United States (Great Lakes, Northeast, Appalachians)
- Nabalus altissimus (L.) Hook. (1833) - tall rattlesnake root - MAN ONT QUE NB NS United States (Northeast, Southeast, South-central)
- Nabalus asper (Michx.) Torr. & A. Gray (1843) - rough rattlesnake root - United States (Great Plains, Mississippi Valley)
- Nabalus autumnalis (Walter) Weakley (2011) - slender rattlesnake root - MS FL SC NC VA DE NJ
- Nabalus barbatus (Torr. & A.Gray) A.Heller - barbed rattlesnake root - TX OK AR LA KY TN MS AL GA
- Nabalus boottii DC. (1838) - Boott’s rattlesnake root - NY VT NH ME (possibly a synonym of Prenanthes boottii)
- Nabalus carrii (Singhurst, O'Kennon & W.C.Holmes) Weakley - canyon rattlesnake root - Texas
- Nabalus crepidineus (Michx.) DC. (1838) - nodding rattlesnake root - MN IA MO AR TN KY IL IN WI MI OH WV PA NY
- Nabalus hastatus (Less.) A.Heller - western rattlesnake root - AK, ALB, Aleutian Islands, BC, ID, MT, OR, WA
- Nabalus × mainensis (A.Gray) A.Heller [N. racemosus × trifoliolatus] - Maine rattlesnake root - NY QUE ME NS NB
- Nabalus racemosus (Michx.) Hook (1833) - glaucous rattlesnake root - Canada, northern United States
- Nabalus roanensis Chick. (1880) - Roan Mountain rattlesnake root - southern Appalachians (VA NC TN)
- Nabalus sagittatus (A.Gray) Rydb. (1900) - arrow-leaf rattlesnake root - BC ALB ID MT
- Nabalus serpentaria (Pursh) Hook. (1833) - lion's foot rattlesnake root - eastern United States (MS + FL to NH)
- Nabalus trifoliolatus Cass. (1825) - three-leaved rattlesnake root - eastern North America (GA to ONT + LAB)

=== Formerly placed here ===
- Nabalus faberi (Hemsl.) Sennikov (2000) - synonym of Faberia faberi
