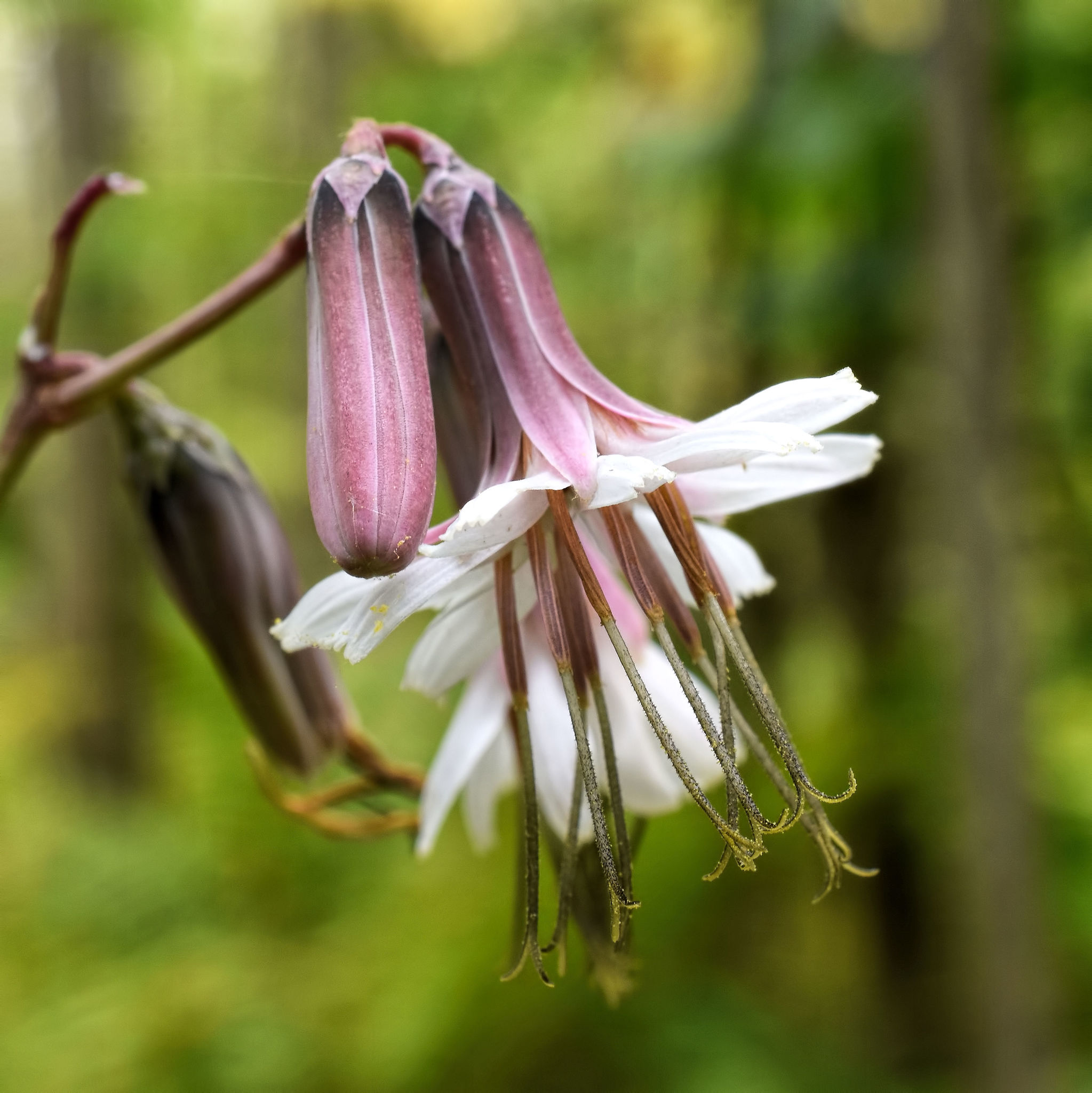

Scientific classification
- Kingdom: Plantae
- Clade: Embryophytes
- Clade: Tracheophytes
- Clade: Angiosperms
- Clade: Eudicots
- Clade: Asterids
- Order: Asterales
- Family: Asteraceae
- Genus: Nabalus
- Species: N. albus

Binomial name
- Nabalus albus (L.) Hook.

Synonyms
- Prenanthes alba L.

= Nabalus albus =

Species of flowering plant

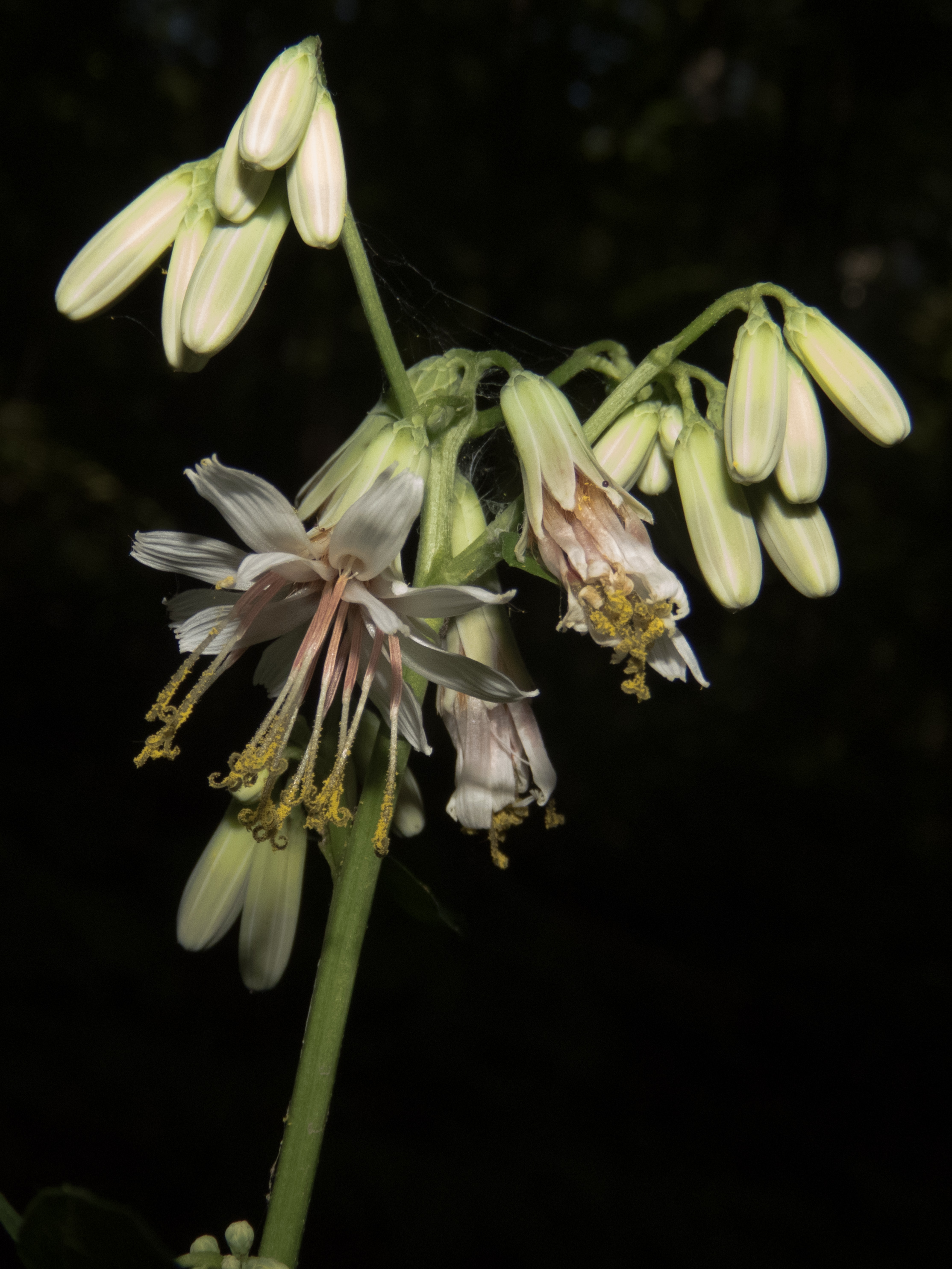
Nabalus albus in bloom on the Bruce Trail near Hamilton, Ontario, Canada.

Nabalus albus, the white rattlesnake-root or white lettuce, is a plant in the family Asteraceae, native to Canada and the Eastern United States. Details of the flower heads are needed to separate this species from others in the rattlesnake-root genus (Nabalus). The Iroquois applied a poultice of the roots of white rattlesnake root to rattlesnake bites. It can be found growing in forests, woodlands, and anthropogenic habitats. The flower head has ray flowers only, meaning all of the individual flowers of the flower head have a strap-shaped ray, which may or may not have teeth at the very tip of the ray. The colors vary from blue to purple, pink to red, or white. The leaf blade length can be between 40 and 300 mm. while the flower head width can be 3 to 5 mm. It blooms from July to September in Missouri. In 2010 it was reclassified from the genus Prenanthes to Nabalus.

== Range ==
White rattlesnake-root is native to Canada and the Eastern United States west into North Dakota, northeast Missouri, and four counties in northwest Arkansas. It is commonly present in Connecticut, Maine, Massachusetts, New Hampshire, and Vermont.
