= Melanoseris pendryi =

Scientific classification
- Kingdom: Plantae
- Clade: Embryophytes
- Clade: Tracheophytes
- Clade: Spermatophytes
- Clade: Angiosperms
- Clade: Eudicots
- Clade: Asterids
- Order: Asterales
- Family: Asteraceae
- Genus: Melanoseris
- Species: M. pendryi

Binomial name
- Melanoseris pendryi D. Maity & Khuroo

Species of flowering plant

Melanoseris pendryi is a species of flowering plant in the family Asteraceae. It was discovered in the alpine grasslands of the Indian state of Sikkim in the Himalayas at elevations above 4,000 m (13,000 ft) and first described in 2026.

== Description ==
It is recognized by its lavender petals, which have fine white hairs on the underside.
