= Dubyaea =

Scientific classification
- Kingdom: Plantae
- Clade: Tracheophytes
- Clade: Angiosperms
- Clade: Eudicots
- Clade: Asterids
- Order: Asterales
- Family: Asteraceae
- Subfamily: Cichorioideae
- Tribe: Cichorieae
- Subtribe: Crepidinae
- Genus: Dubyaea; DC.

Synonyms
- Micrauchenia Froel.

Genus of flowering plants

Dubyaea is a genus of Asian flowering plants in the family Asteraceae, native to the Himalayas, Tibet, Myanmar, and south-central China.

== Species ==
11 species are accepted.

- Dubyaea atropurpurea Stebbins
- Dubyaea blinii (H.Lév.) N.Kilian
- Dubyaea cymiformis C.Shih
- Dubyaea emeiensis C.Shih
- Dubyaea forrestii Mamgain & R.R.Rao
- Dubyaea hispida DC.
- Dubyaea jinyangensis C.Shih
- Dubyaea oligocephala (Sch.Bip.) Stebbins
- Dubyaea rubra Stebbins
- Dubyaea stebbinsii Ludlow
- Dubyaea tsarongensis (W.W.Sm.) Stebbins

=== Former species ===
A 2021 molecular phylogenetic analysis of various species in Dubyaea found that 2 species, Dubyaea amoena (Hand.-Mazz.) Stebbins and Dubyaea gombalana (Hand.-Mazz.) Stebbins, were distinct from the rest of the genus. The new genus of Lihengia was established to include them, with the species Lihengia amoena (Hand.-Mazz.) Y.S.Chen & R.Ke and Lihengia gombalana (Hand.-Mazz.) Y.S.Chen & R.Ke.
