= Soroseris glomerata =

Scientific classification
- Kingdom: Plantae
- Clade: Tracheophytes
- Clade: Angiosperms
- Clade: Eudicots
- Clade: Asterids
- Order: Asterales
- Family: Asteraceae
- Genus: Soroseris
- Species: S. glomerata

Binomial name
- Soroseris glomerata (S.Moore) Stebbins

Synonyms
- Crepis depressa Hook.f. & Thomson ex C.B.Cl.; Crepis gillii var. bellidifolia Hand.-Mazz.; Crepis glomerata (Decne.) Benth. & Hook.f.; Crepis glomerata (Decne.) Decne.; Crepis glomerata var. glomerata; Crepis hookeriana C.B.Cl.; Crepis rosularis Diels; Crepis sorocephala Hemsl.; Hieracioides glomeratum (DC.) Kuntze; Lactuca deasyi S. Moore; Prenanthes glomerata Decne.; Prenanthes glomerata Rchb. ex DC.; Soroseris bellidifolia (Hand.-Mazz.) Stebbins; Soroseris deasyi (S. Moore) Stebbins; Soroseris depressa (Hook.f. & Thomson) Stebbins; Soroseris pumila Stebbins; Soroseris rosularis (Diels) Stebbins

Species of flowering plant

Soroseris glomerata is a species of thick stem flowering plant in the family Asteraceae, a type of lettuce with small leaves of China, where it is called 绢毛菊.
