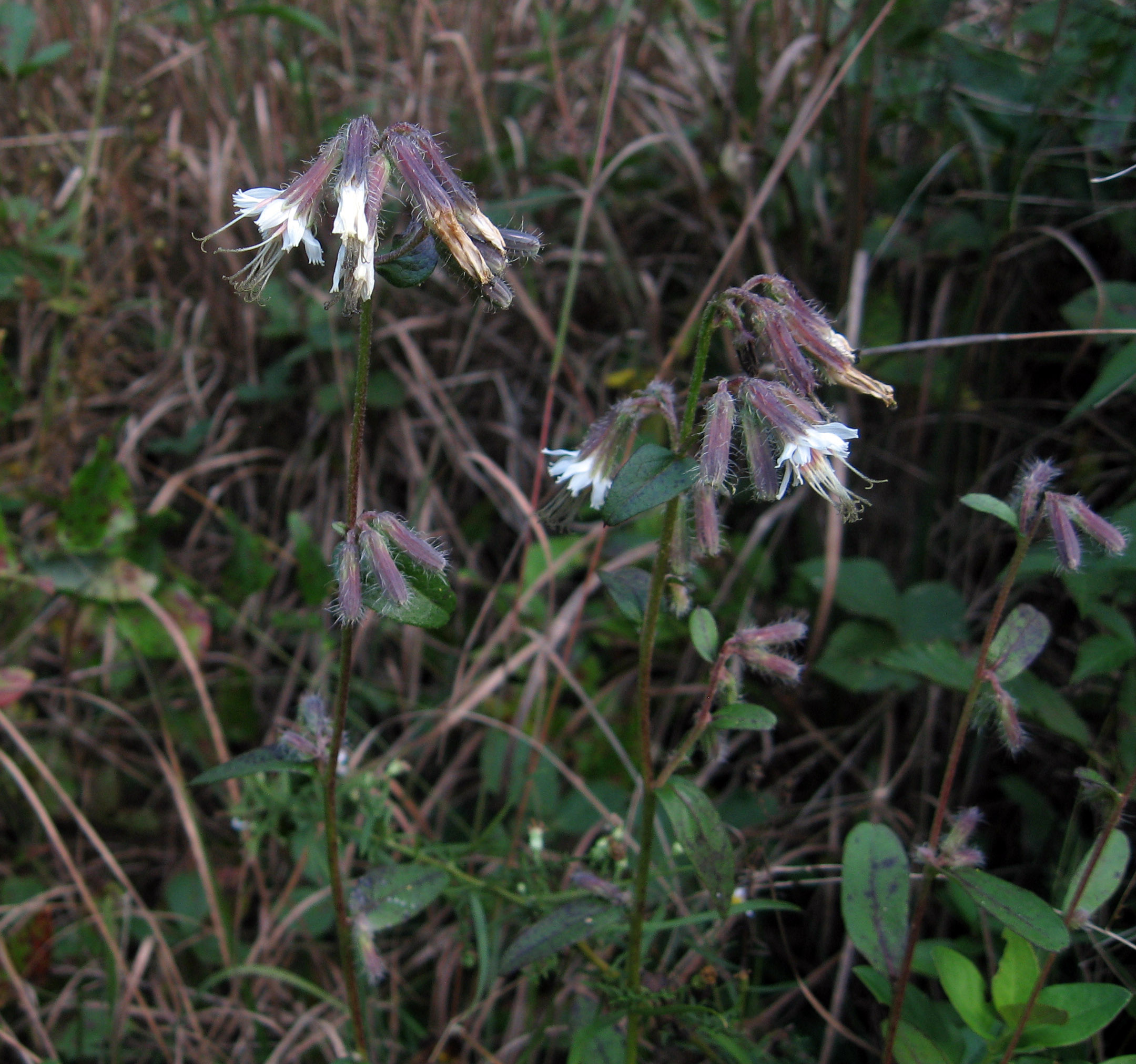

Conservation status
- Vulnerable (NatureServe)

Scientific classification
- Kingdom: Plantae
- Clade: Tracheophytes
- Clade: Angiosperms
- Clade: Eudicots
- Clade: Asterids
- Order: Asterales
- Family: Asteraceae
- Genus: Nabalus
- Species: N. barbatus

Binomial name
- Nabalus barbatus (Torr. & A.Gray) A.Heller

Synonyms
- Prenanthes barbata (Torr. & A.Gray) Milstead

= Nabalus barbatus =

Species of flowering plant

Nabalus barbatus, the barbed rattlesnakeroot, is a plant in the family Asteraceae. It is native to the Southeastern United States where it is found in small numbers in a few disjunct areas of remaining natural grassland. Because of this, it is considered a globally rare species, with only 35-70 remaining populations. Much of its natural habitat of prairie and savanna has been destroyed. In 2010 it was reclassified from the genus Prenanthes to Nabalus.

It is a perennial that flowers in early fall, although flowering has been reported into November.

== Habitat ==
The natural habitat of this species is prairie and savanna. It is known from rich hardwood and pine-oak forest as well as mesic ravine slope forest in the pineywoods of east Texas.

== Range ==
This species occurs from Oklahoma, Arkansas, and Kentucky south from Texas to Georgia. It occurs in nine counties in central and southeast Arkansas and in 13 counties in the eastern four counties of Texas.
