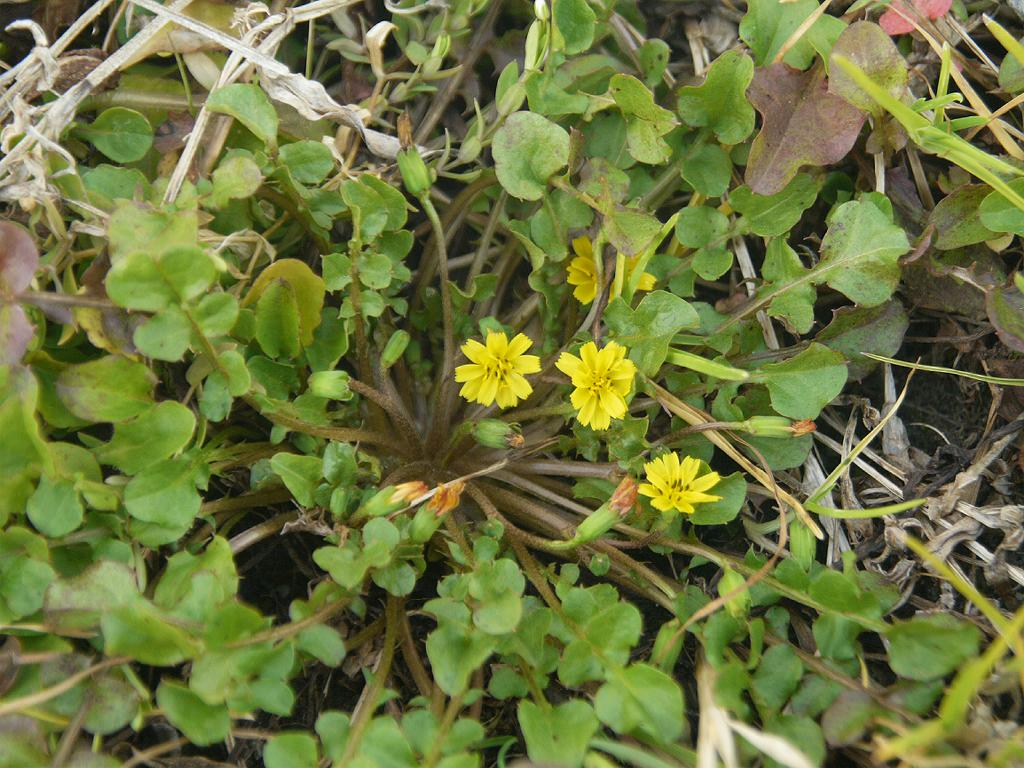
- Lapsanastrum apogonoides

Scientific classification
- Kingdom: Plantae
- Clade: Embryophytes
- Clade: Tracheophytes
- Clade: Angiosperms
- Clade: Eudicots
- Clade: Asterids
- Order: Asterales
- Family: Asteraceae
- Subfamily: Cichorioideae
- Tribe: Cichorieae
- Subtribe: Crepidinae
- Genus: Lapsanastrum; Pak & K.Bremer

= Lapsanastrum =

Genus of flowering plants

Lapsanastrum is a genus of flowering plants in the family Asteraceae, native to East Asia (China, Korea, Japan).

Species

- Lapsanastrum apogonoides (Maxim.) Pak & K.Bremer - Anhui, Fujian, Guangdong, Guangxi, Hunan, Jiangsu, Jiangxi, Shaanxi, Taiwan, Yunnan, Zhejiang, Japan, Korea; naturalized in Oregon
- Lapsanastrum humile (Thunb.) Pak & K.Bremer - Anhui, Fujian, Jiangsu, Zhejiang, Japan, Korea
- Lapsanastrum takasei (Sasaki) Pak & K.Bremer - Taiwan
- Lapsanastrum uncinatum (Stebbins) Pak & K.Bremer - Anhui
