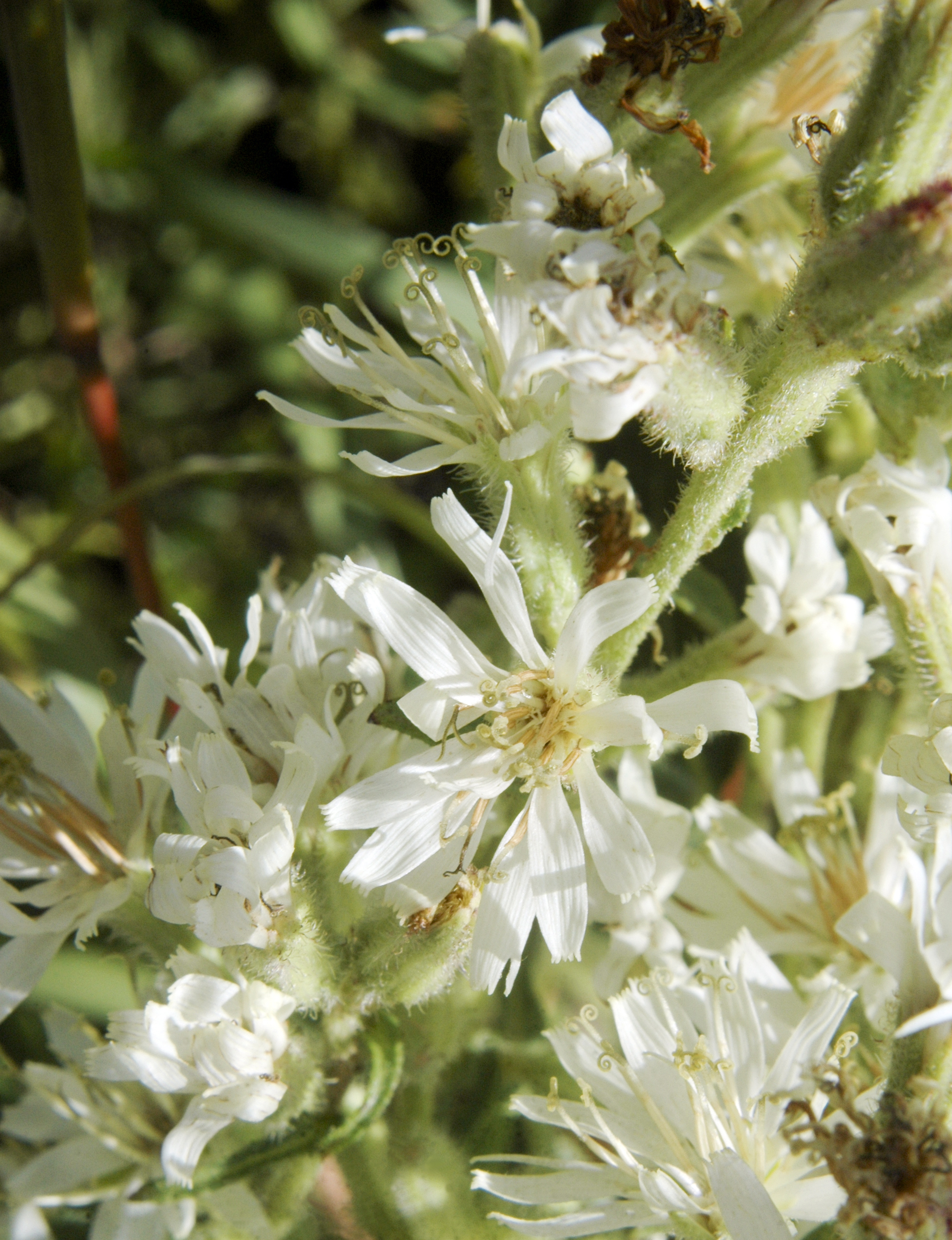

Scientific classification
- Kingdom: Plantae
- Clade: Tracheophytes
- Clade: Angiosperms
- Clade: Eudicots
- Clade: Asterids
- Order: Asterales
- Family: Asteraceae
- Genus: Nabalus
- Species: N. asper

Binomial name
- Nabalus asper (Michx.) Torrey and A.Gray

Synonyms
- Prenanthes aspera Michx.

= Nabalus asper =

Plant in the family Asteraceae

Nabalus asper (formerly Prenanthes aspera), commonly called the rough rattlesnakeroot or rough white lettuce, is a species of plant in the family Asteraceae occurring in the eastern United States from South Dakota and Pennsylvania south to Oklahoma, Louisiana, and Alabama. This perennial plant blooms in late summer and autumn. In 2010, it was reclassified from the genus Prenanthes to Nabalus.

== Historic distribution ==
Jason Hale collected this species sometime before 1843 in Louisiana, probably near where he lived at the time in Rapides Parish and probably in a prairie that no longer exists; his specimen is still the only known collection in Louisiana.
