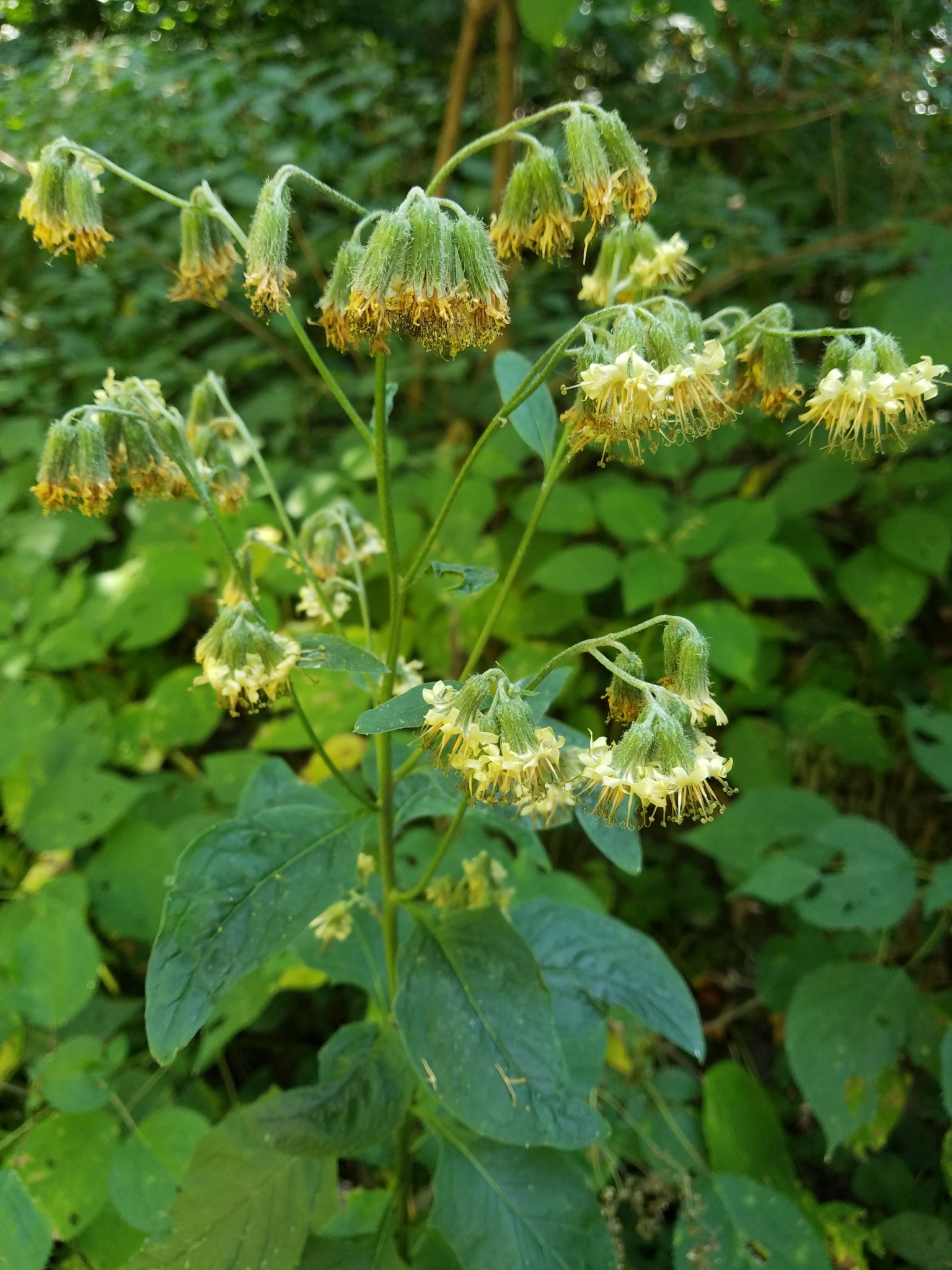

Conservation status
- Apparently Secure (NatureServe)

Scientific classification
- Kingdom: Plantae
- Clade: Tracheophytes
- Clade: Angiosperms
- Clade: Eudicots
- Clade: Asterids
- Order: Asterales
- Family: Asteraceae
- Genus: Nabalus
- Species: N. crepidineus

Binomial name
- Nabalus crepidineus (Michx.) DC.

Synonyms
- Prenanthes crepidinea Michx.

= Nabalus crepidineus =

Species of flowering plant

Nabalus crepidineus, commonly called the nodding rattlesnakeroot, is a species of flowering plant in the family Asteraceae. It is native to the United States, where it is found in the Midwest and Upland South regions. Its natural habitat is in bottomland and mesic forests, and along streambanks.

== Description ==
It is a perennial flowering plant growing up to 3 m (9.8 ft) tall. It produces white (sometimes yellow) flowers in late summer and autumn. It is most easily seen in the spring, where it can forms large colonies of sterile basal rosettes. These rosettes are typically epehemeral, with proportionally very few persisting beyond mid-summer into the flowering period.

Molecular and morphological evidence indicates that Nabalus crepidineus and its North American relatives are best treated in a separate genus from Prenanthes. This treatment became widely adopted in the 2010s.

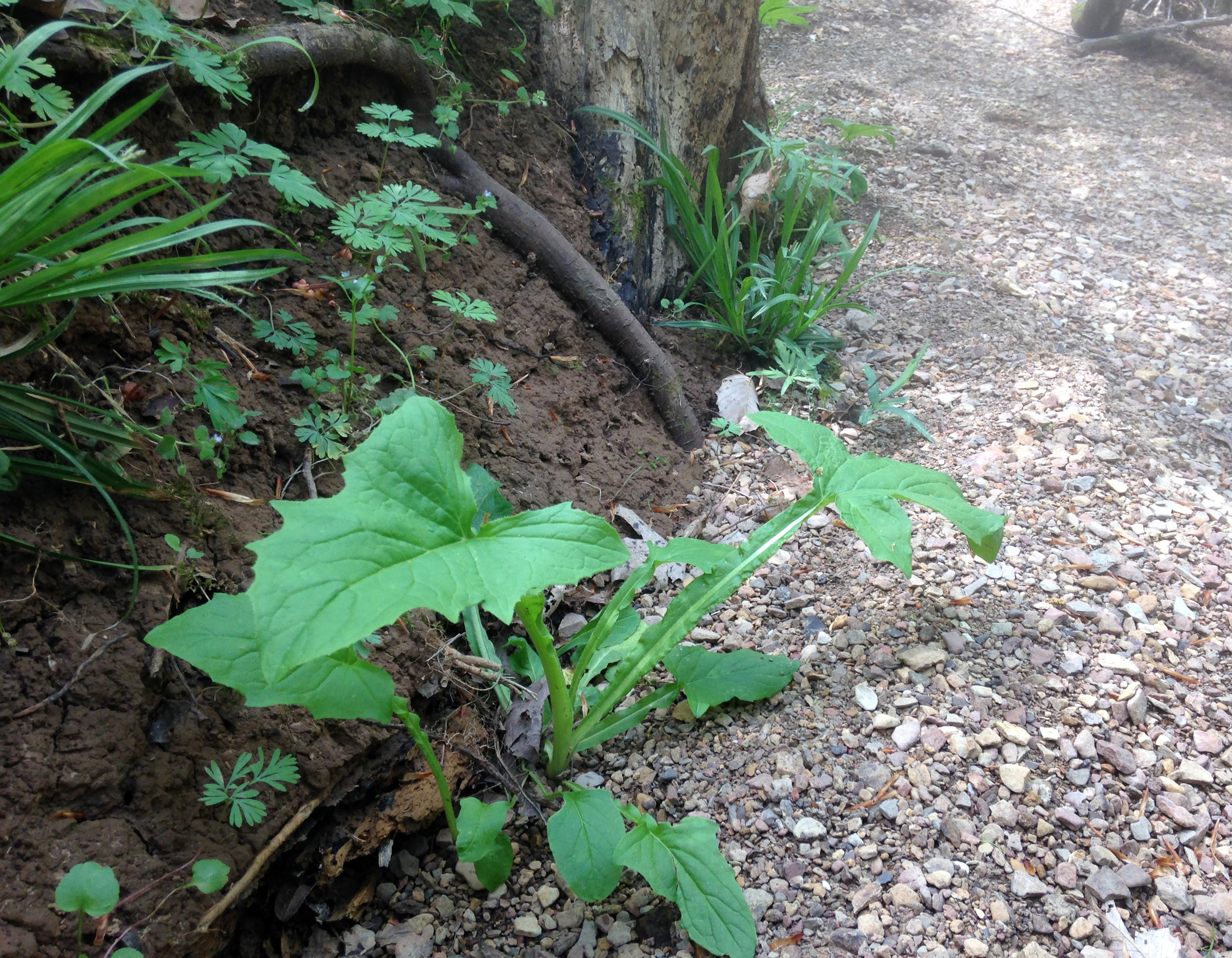
N. crepidineus is most often seen as only basal leaves

== Range ==
This plant occurs from western New York west to southeastern tip of Minnesota, south to Arkansas and Tennessee. Although widespread, it is considered infrequent throughout its range.

In Arkansas, this species occurs in 12 counties, mostly in the Arkansas Ozarks.
