= Soroseris =

Scientific classification
- Kingdom: Plantae
- Clade: Tracheophytes
- Clade: Angiosperms
- Clade: Eudicots
- Clade: Asterids
- Order: Asterales
- Family: Asteraceae
- Subfamily: Cichorioideae
- Tribe: Cichorieae
- Subtribe: Crepidinae
- Genus: Soroseris; Stebbins

Type species
- Soroseris glomerata (Decne.) Stebbins

Synonyms
- Stebbinsia Lipsch.

Genus of plants

Soroseris is a genus of Asian plants in the tribe Cichorieae within the family Asteraceae.

Species

- Soroseris depressa (Hook. f. & Thomson) J.W. Zhang, N. Kilian & H. Sun - Tibet, Bhutan, Sikkim, Nepal
- Soroseris erysimoides (Hand.-Mazz.) C.Shih - Gansu, Qinghai, Shaanxi, Sichuan, Tibet, Yunnan, Bhutan, Sikkim, Nepal
- Soroseris glomerata (Decne.) Stebbins - Gansu, Qinghai, Sichuan, Xinjiang, Tibet, Yunnan, Kashmir, Nepal, Uttarakhand, Pakistan
- Soroseris hookeriana (C.B.Clarke) Stebbins - Gansu, Qinghai, Sichuan, Tibet, Yunnan, Bhutan, Uttarakhand, Nepal
- Soroseris pumila Stebbins - Tibet, Bhutan, Sikkim
- Soroseris teres C.Shih - Tibet, Bhutan
- Soroseris umbrella (Franch.) Stebbins - Sichuan, Tibet, Yunnan, Bhutan, Sikkim
