= Syncalathium orbiculariforme =

Scientific classification
- Kingdom: Plantae
- Clade: Tracheophytes
- Clade: Angiosperms
- Clade: Eudicots
- Clade: Asterids
- Order: Asterales
- Family: Asteraceae
- Genus: Syncalathium
- Species: S. orbiculariforme

Binomial name
- Syncalathium orbiculariforme C.Shih

Species of flowering plant

Syncalathium orbiculariforme is a species of flowering plant in the family Asteraceae, native to Tibet, Sichuan and Yunnan. It was first described in 1993.
