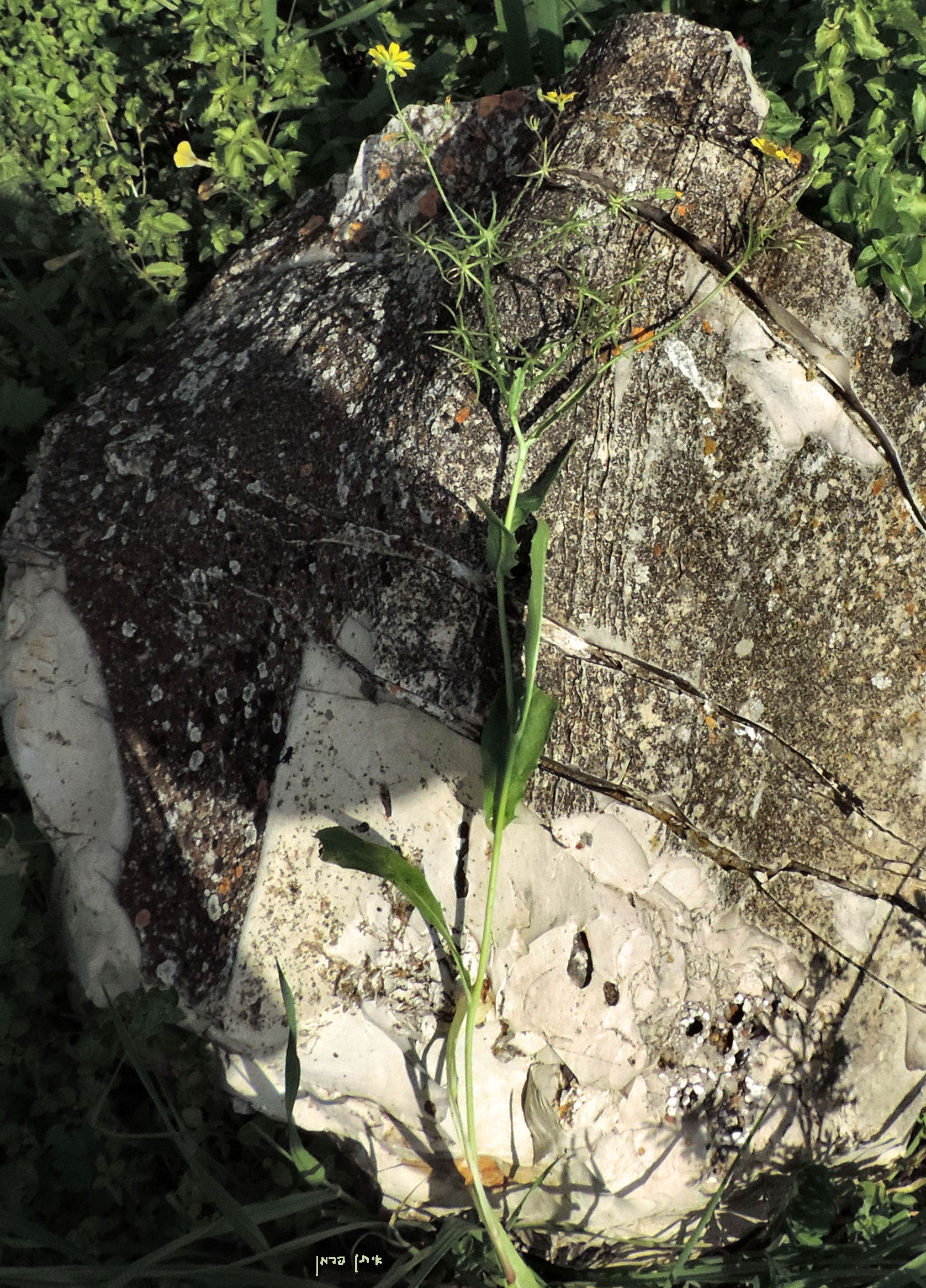

Scientific classification
- Kingdom: Plantae
- Clade: Tracheophytes
- Clade: Angiosperms
- Clade: Eudicots
- Clade: Asterids
- Order: Asterales
- Family: Asteraceae
- Genus: Rhagadiolus
- Species: R. stellatus

Binomial name
- Rhagadiolus stellatus (L.) Gaertn.

Synonyms
- Rhagadiolus edulis

= Rhagadiolus stellatus =

Species of plant

Rhagadiolus stellatus, or the endive daisy, is a species of annual herb in the family Asteraceae. They have a self-supporting growth form and simple, broad leaves. Individuals can grow to 0.22 m.

== Sources ==
This article incorporates text from a free content work. Licensed under CC0 (license statement/permission). Text taken from Rhagadiolus stellatus. Encyclopedia of Life.
