= Lagoseriopsis =

Scientific classification
- Kingdom: Plantae
- Clade: Tracheophytes
- Clade: Angiosperms
- Clade: Eudicots
- Clade: Asterids
- Order: Asterales
- Family: Asteraceae
- Subfamily: Cichorioideae
- Tribe: Cichorieae
- Subtribe: Crepidinae
- Genus: Lagoseriopsis; Kirp.
- Species: L. popovii

Binomial name
- Lagoseriopsis popovii (Krasch.) Kirp.

Genus of plants

Lagoseriopsis is a monotypic genus of flowering plants belonging to the family Asteraceae. The only species is Lagoseriopsis popovii.

Its native range is Central Asia.
