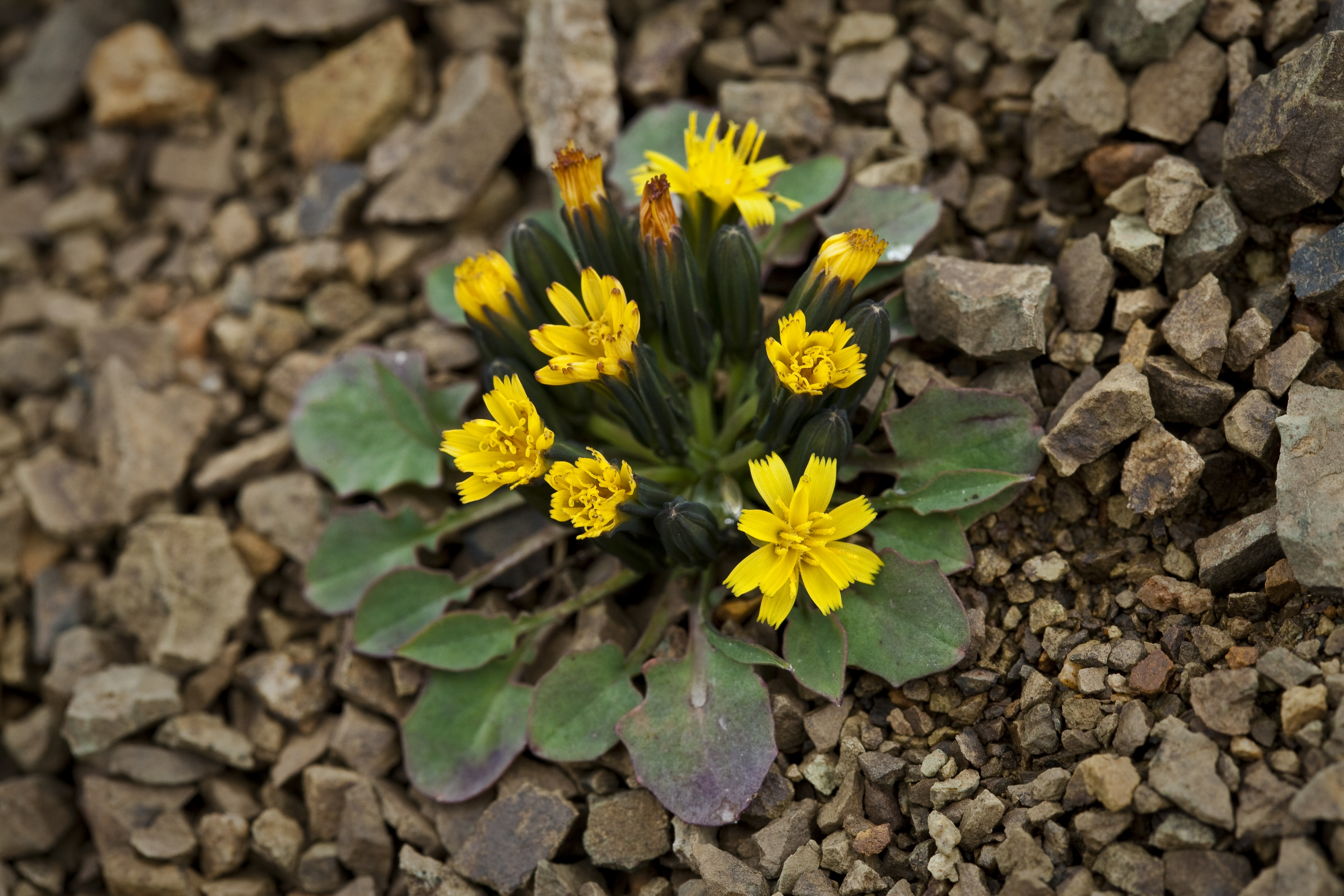

Conservation status
- Secure (NatureServe)

Scientific classification
- Kingdom: Plantae
- Clade: Tracheophytes
- Clade: Angiosperms
- Clade: Eudicots
- Clade: Asterids
- Order: Asterales
- Family: Asteraceae
- Genus: Askellia
- Species: A. pygmaea

Binomial name
- Askellia pygmaea (Ledeb.)Sennikov

Synonyms
- Askellia nana (Richardson) W.A.Weber; Barkhausia nana (Richardson) DC.; Crepis cochlearifolia Fisch. ex Herder; Crepis nana Richardson; Hieracioides nanum (Richardson) Kuntze; Prenanthes pygmaea Ledeb.; Youngia nana (Richardson) Rydb.; Youngia pygmaea (Ledeb.) Ledeb.

= Askellia pygmaea =

Species of flowering plant

Askellia pygmaea, the dwarf alpine hawksbeard, is a species of Asian and North American plants in the tribe Cichorieae within the family Asteraceae.

== Distribution ==
It is native to western, northern, and eastern Canada (Yukon, Northwest Territories, British Columbia, Alberta, Nunavut, Quebec, Labrador, Newfoundland), the western United States (Alaska, Montana, Wyoming, Colorado, Idaho, Utah, Nevada, Washington, Oregon, California), Russia, Mongolia, Kazakhstan, and western China (Tibet + Xinjiang).

== Description ==
Askellia pygmaea is a perennial up to 20 cm (8 inches) tall, with a deep taproot and spreading by means of underground rhizomes thus forming dense clumps. Stems are sometimes erect, but sometimes trailing along the ground. One plant can have more than 80 small flower heads, each with 9-12 yellow ray florets but no disc florets.
