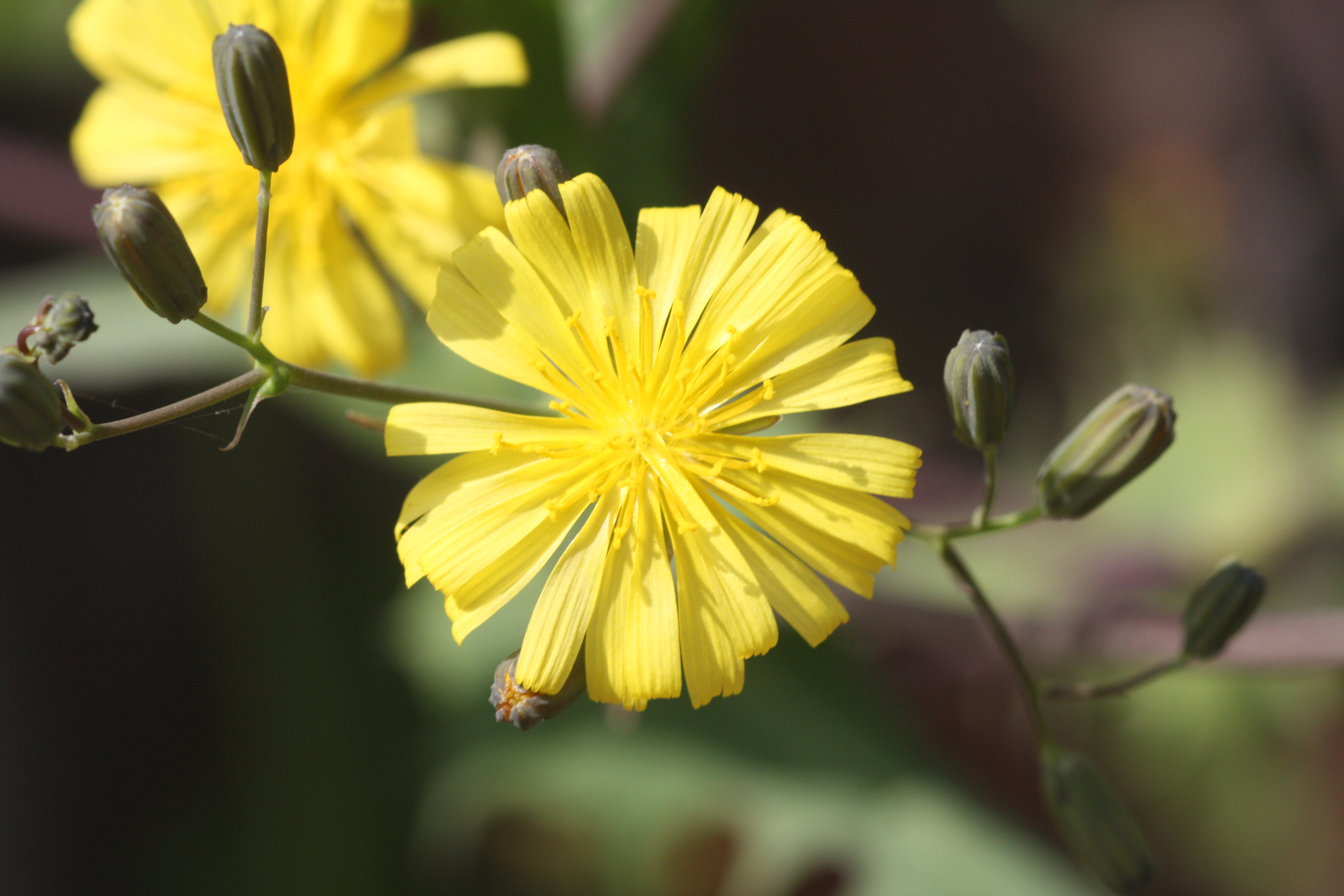

Scientific classification
- Kingdom: Plantae
- Clade: Tracheophytes
- Clade: Angiosperms
- Clade: Eudicots
- Clade: Asterids
- Order: Asterales
- Family: Asteraceae
- Genus: Crepidiastrum
- Species: C. sonchifolium

Binomial name
- Crepidiastrum sonchifolium (Maxim.) Pak & Kawano

Synonyms
- Crepidiastrum sonchifolium var. elegans (Franch.) Sennikov; Crepidiastrum sonchifolium var. sonchifolium; Crepidiastrum sonchifolium subsp. sonchifolium; Ixeridium elegans (Franch.) C.Shih; Ixeridium sonchifolium (Maxim.) C.Shih; Ixeris denticulata subsp. elegans (Franch.) Stebbins; Ixeris denticulata subsp. sonchifolia (Bunge) Stebbins; Ixeris serotina (Maxim.) Kitag.; Ixeris sonchifolia (Maxim.) Hance; Ixeris sonchifolia var. serotina (Maxim.) Kitag.; Ixeris sonchifolia var. sonchifolia; Lactuca bungeana Nakai; Lactuca denticulata var. sonchifolia Maxim.; Lactuca elegans Franch.; Paraixeris serotina (Maxim.) Tzvelev; Paraixeris sonchifolia (Maxim.) Tzvelev; Paraixeris sonchifolia var. serotina (Maxim.) Kitag.; Paraixeris sonchifolia var. sonchifolia; Youngia serotina Maxim.; Youngia sonchifolia (Bunge) Maxim.

= Crepidiastrum sonchifolium =

Species of flowering plant

Crepidiastrum sonchifolium, the sonchus-leaf crepidiastrum, is a flowering plant in the family Asteraceae. It is native to East Asia (China, Korea, Mongolia), and is cultivated in Korea. Crepidiastrum sonchifolium is an annual or biennial herb that grows 20–100 cm (7.9–39.4 in) tall. It grows in a variety of habitats including grasslands on mountain slopes, thickets, rocky stream beds, cliffs, and roadsides.
