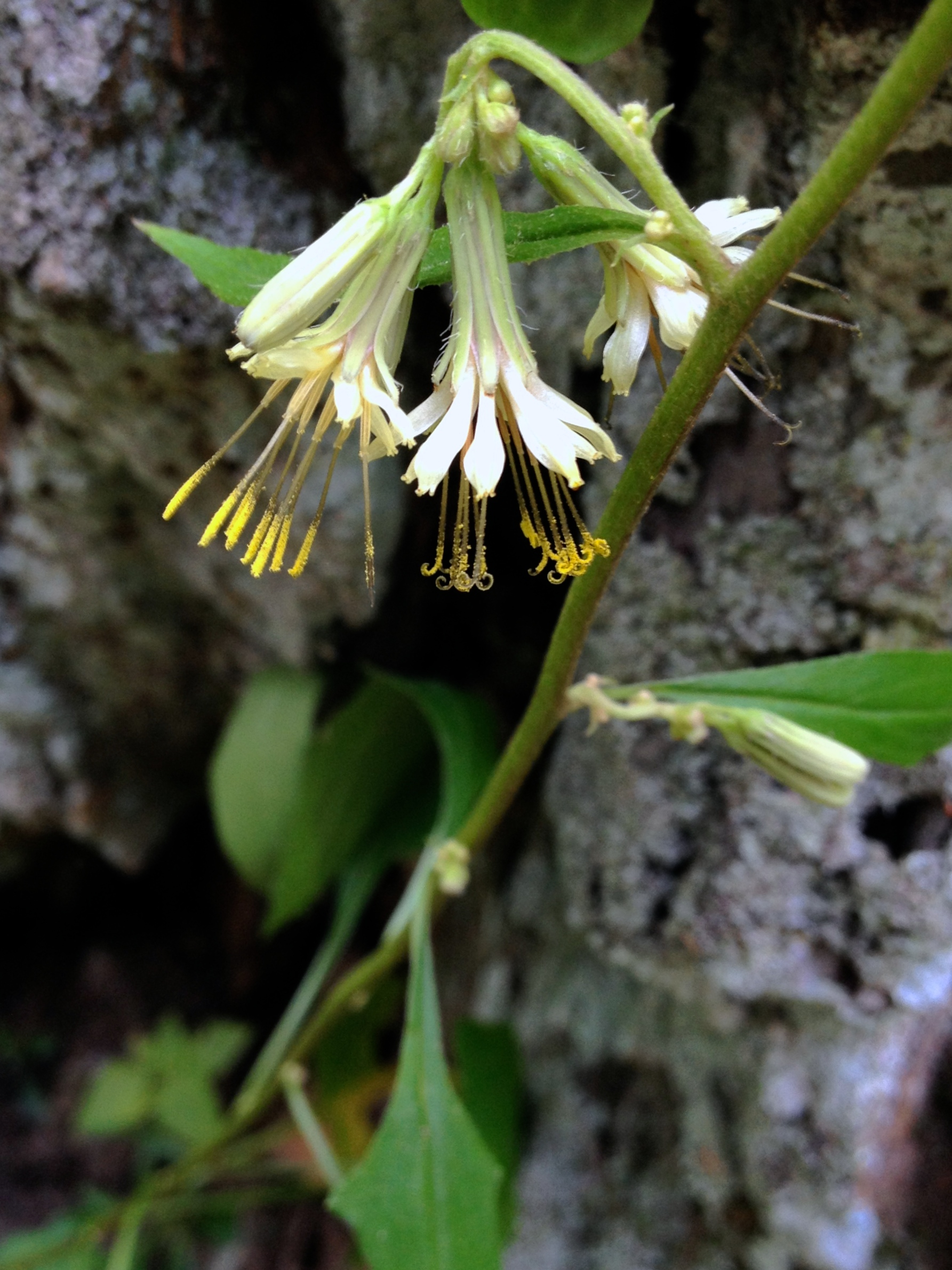

Scientific classification
- Kingdom: Plantae
- Clade: Embryophytes
- Clade: Tracheophytes
- Clade: Angiosperms
- Clade: Eudicots
- Clade: Asterids
- Order: Asterales
- Family: Asteraceae
- Genus: Nabalus
- Species: N. serpentarius

Binomial name
- Nabalus serpentarius (Pursh) Hook.

Synonyms
- Prenanthes serpentaria Pursh

= Nabalus serpentarius =

Species of flowering plant

Nabalus serpentarius (commonly known as cankerweed, gall-of-the-earth, or lion's-foot) is a perennial flower species found in North America.

== Description ==
Nabalus serpentarius may reach a total height between 50 and 200 cm (20 and 79 in), with erect stems that may vary from green to red to purple in coloration). Leaf blades are deltate to ovate in shape, reaching a length of 5 to 20 cm (2.0 to 7.9 in) and a width of 4 to 10 cm (1.6 to 3.9 in). The margins pinnately lobed, resulting in 3 to 5 lobes.

Blooms are white to yellow in color, with petals ranging in length between 9 and 15 mm (0.35 and 0.59 in). N. serpentarius blooms from August through October.

== Distribution and habitat ==
Within North America N. serpentarius can be found in the eastern United States, its native range stretching from New York to Florida and westward through Mississippi.

Nabalus serpentarius may be found in habitats such as forest ecosystems.
