= Melanoseris souliei =

Scientific classification
- Kingdom: Plantae
- Clade: Tracheophytes
- Clade: Angiosperms
- Clade: Eudicots
- Clade: Asterids
- Order: Asterales
- Family: Asteraceae
- Genus: Melanoseris
- Species: M. souliei

Binomial name
- Melanoseris souliei (Franch.) N.Kilian

Synonyms
- Lactuca souliei Franch.; Parasyncalathium souliei (Franch.) J.W.Zhang; Syncalathium souliei (Franch.) Y.Ling

Genus of flowering plants

Melanoseris souliei is a species of flowering plant in the family Asteraceae, native from Tibet to Sichuan and Yunnan, and to northern Myanmar. It was first described by Adrien René Franchet in 1895 as Lactuca souliei. Under the synonym Parasyncalathium souliei was the only species in the monotypic genus Parasyncalathium.
