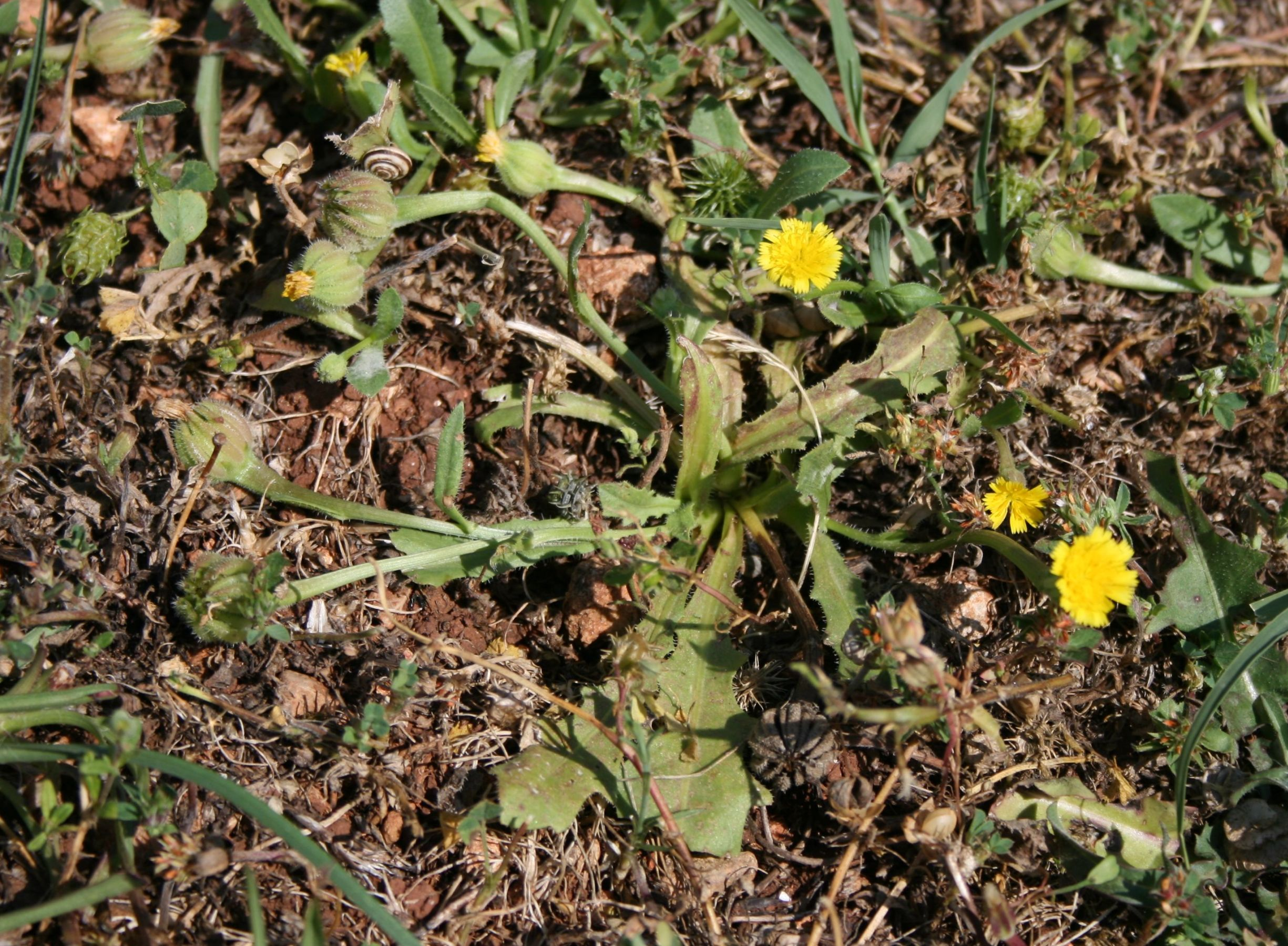
- Hedypnois rhagadioloides

Scientific classification
- Kingdom: Plantae
- Clade: Tracheophytes
- Clade: Angiosperms
- Clade: Eudicots
- Clade: Asterids
- Order: Asterales
- Family: Asteraceae
- Subfamily: Cichorioideae
- Tribe: Cichorieae
- Subtribe: Hypochaeridinae
- Genus: Hedypnois; Mill. 1754 not Scop. 1772 nor Schreb. 1791

Type species
- Hedypnois annua (syn of H. rhagadioloides) Mill. ex Ferris

Synonyms
- Hedypnois Scop.

= Hedypnois =

Genus of flowering plants

Hedypnois is a genus of flowering plants in the family Asteraceae.

Species

- Hedypnois arenaria (Schousb.) DC. - Spain, Portugal, Morocco, Canary Islands
- Hedypnois arenicola Sennen & Mauricio - Morocco
- Hedypnois caspica Hornem.
- Hedypnois rhagadioloides (L.) F.W.Schmidt - Mediterranean Region from Canary Islands to Iran; introduced in Australia and North + South America
