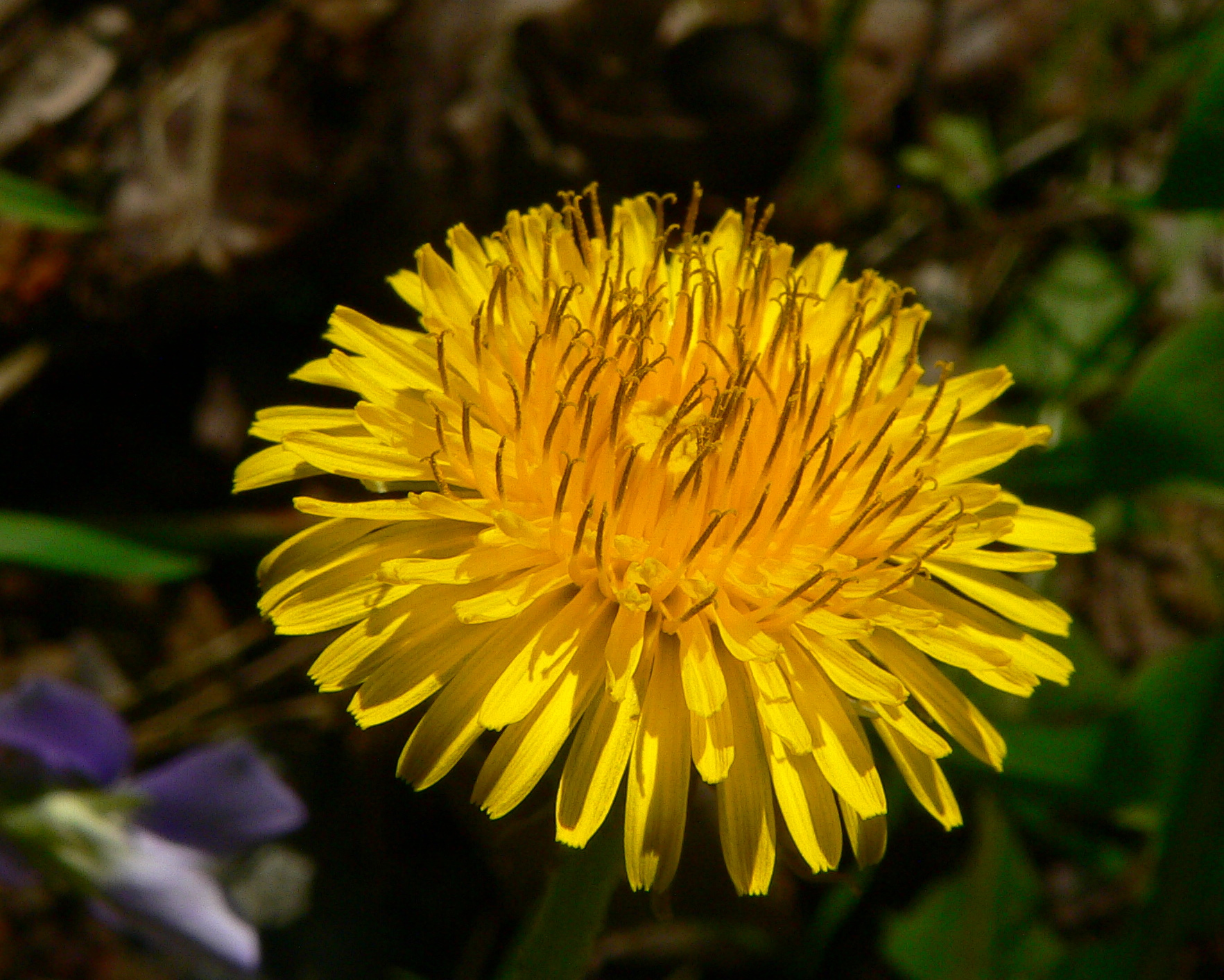
- Taraxacum officinale

Scientific classification
- Kingdom: Plantae
- Clade: Tracheophytes
- Clade: Angiosperms
- Clade: Eudicots
- Clade: Asterids
- Order: Asterales
- Family: Asteraceae
- Subfamily: Cichorioideae
- Tribe: Cichorieae
- Subtribe: Crepidinae; Cass. ex Dumort.

Genera
- See text

= Crepidinae =

Subtribe of plants

Crepidinae is a subtribe of Cichorieae in the family Asteraceae.

Crepidinae genera recognized by the Global Compositae Database as of June 2022:

- × Crepihieracium P.Fourn.
- Acanthocephalus Kar. & Kir.
- Askellia W.A.Weber
- Crepidiastrum Nakai
- Crepidifolium Sennikov
- Crepis L.
- Dubyaea DC.
- Faberia Hemsl.
- Garhadiolus Jaub. & Spach
- Heteracia Fisch. & C.A.Mey.
- Heteroderis (Bunge) Boiss.
- Hololeion Kitam.
- Ixeridium (A.Gray) Tzvelev
- Ixeris (Cass.) Cass.
- Lagoseriopsis Kirp.
- Lagoseris M.Bieb.
- Lapsana L.
- Lapsanastrum Pak & K.Bremer
- Nabalus Cass.
- Qineryangia Y.S.Chen & Lian S.Xu
- Rhagadiolus Juss.
- Sonchella Sennikov
- Soroseris Stebbins
- Spiroseris Rech.f.
- Syncalathium Lipsch.
- Taraxacum Weber ex F.H.Wigg.
- Tibetoseris Sennikov
- Youngia Cass.
