= Woolly goat chicory =

Woolly goat chicory is a common name for several plants and may refer to:

- Agoseris apargioides
- Agoseris hirsuta
