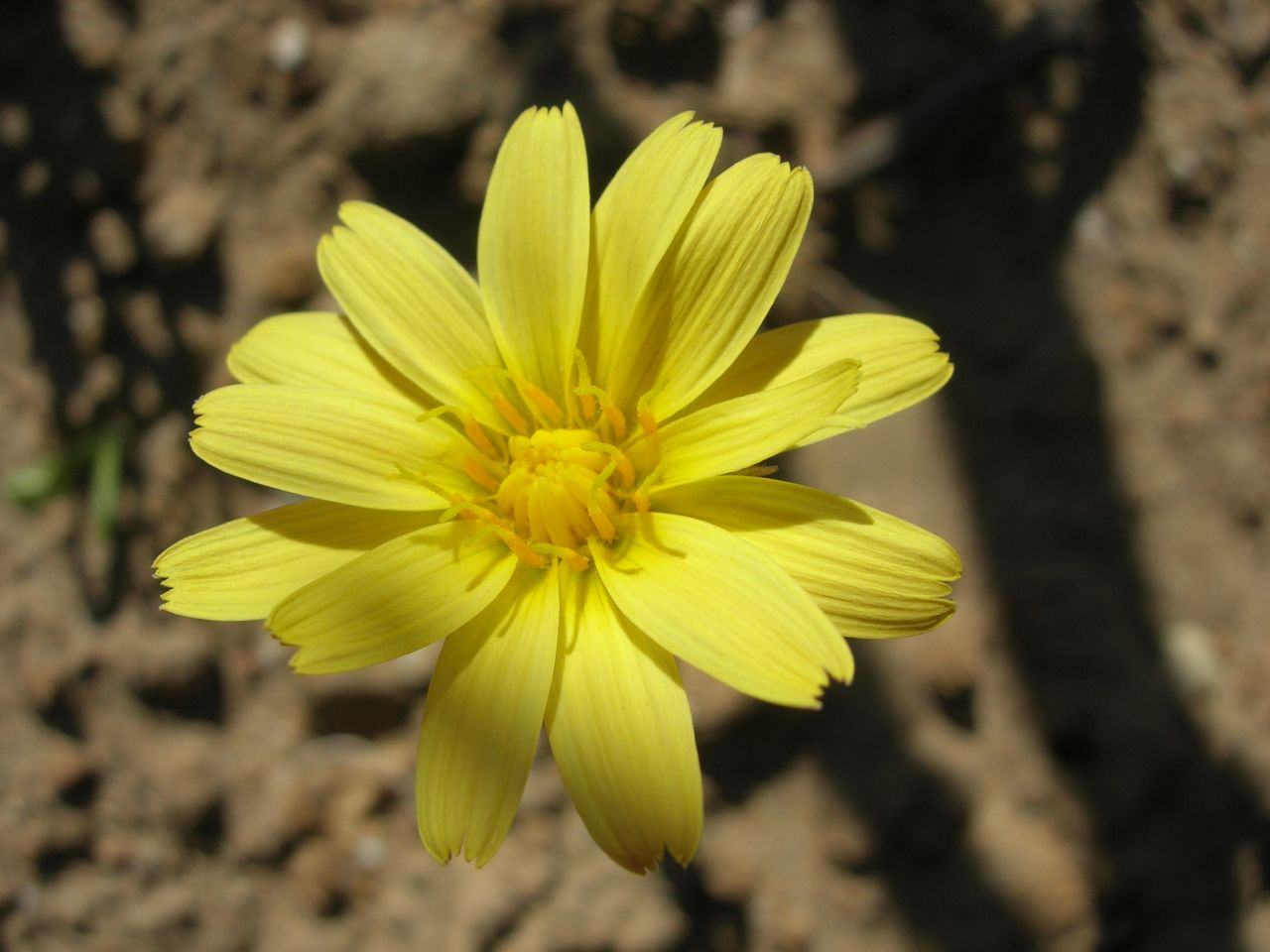
- Microseris sylvatica

Scientific classification
- Kingdom: Plantae
- Clade: Embryophytes
- Clade: Tracheophytes
- Clade: Angiosperms
- Clade: Eudicots
- Clade: Asterids
- Order: Asterales
- Family: Asteraceae
- Subfamily: Cichorioideae
- Tribe: Cichorieae
- Subtribe: Microseridinae
- Genus: Microseris; D.Don

Synonyms
- Apargidium Torr. & A.Gray; Bellardia Colla; Calais DC.; Fichtea Sch.Bip.; Galasia Sch.Bip.; Lepidonema Fisch. & C.A.Mey.; Nothocalais (A.Gray) Greene; Phyllopappus Walp.; Ptilocalais Greene; Ptilophora A.Gray; Scorzonella Nutt.; Stebbinsoseris K.L.Chambers; Uropappus Nutt.

= Microseris =

Genus of flowering plants

Microseris is a genus of plants in the tribe Cichorieae within the family Asteraceae, plants that often called composites. They are native to North America, South America, Australia, and New Zealand.

Plants in the genus can either be annuals or perennials. Perennial plants in Microseris usually have a taproot or a caudex with the exception of Microseris borealis, which is rhizomatous. The leaves are mostly or entirely basal, growing very near the surface of the soil rather than being held on stems above ground level. When blooming the flowers are alone on the top of stems and are held upright when blooming and when producing seeds. The flowers are shades of orange or yellow with a superficial resemblance to dandelions.

There is currently disagreement about which species should be placed in Microseris. Plants of the World Online (POWO) synonymizes genus Nothocalais into Microseris. While the USDA Natural Resources Conservation Service PLANTS database (PLANTS), World Flora Online (WFO), the Global Compositae Database (GCD), and Flora of North America (FNA) continue to list Nothocalais as a separate genus as of 2023.

The only species classified by WFO in Nothocalais is Microseris nigrescens as Nothocalais nigrescens, which is also the classification in PLANTS and FNA. The other species classified by PLANTS and FNA as Nothocalais are Microseris alpestris (N. alpestris), Microseris cuspidata (N. cuspidata), and Microseris troximoides (N. troximoides).

According to POWO Microseris contains the following 22 species:

Scientific name	Authority	Common name	Native Range
Microseris acuminata	Greene	Sierra foothill silverpuffs	California, Oregon
Microseris alpestris	(A.Gray) Q.Jones ex Cronquist	alpine lake false dandelion	California, Oregon, Washington
Microseris bigelovii	(A.Gray) Sch.Bip.	coastal silverpuffs	British Columbia, California, Oregon, Washington
Microseris borealis	(Bong.) Sch.Bip.	northern microseris	Alaska, British Columbia, California, Oregon, Washington
Microseris campestris	Greene	San Joaquin silverpuffs	California
Microseris cuspidata	(Pursh) Sch.Bip.	prairie false dandelion	Alberta, Arkansas, Colorado, Illinois, Iowa, Kansas, Manitoba, Minnesota, Missouri, Montana, Nebraska, New Mexico, North Dakota, Oklahoma, Saskatchewan, South Dakota, Texas, Wisconsin, Wyoming
Microseris decipiens	K.L.Chambers	Santa Cruz silverpuffs	California
Microseris douglasii	(DC.) Sch.Bip.	Douglas' silverpuffs	California, Mexico Northwest, Oregon
Microseris elegans	Greene ex A.Gray	elegant silverpuffs	California, Mexico Northwest
Microseris heterocarpa	(Nutt.) K.L.Chambers	grassland silverpuffs	Arizona, California, Mexico Northwest
Microseris howellii	A.Gray	Howell's silverpuffs	Oregon
Microseris laciniata	(Hook.) Sch.Bip.	cutleaf silverpuffs	California, Oregon, Washington
Microseris lanceolata	(Walp.) Sch.Bip.	murnong	New South Wales, Queensland, South Australia, Tasmania, Victoria, Western Australia
Microseris lindleyi	(DC.) A.Gray	Lindley's silverpuffs	Arizona, British Columbia, California, Idaho, Mexico Northwest, Nevada, New Mexico, Oregon, Texas, Utah, Washington
Microseris nigrescens	L.F.Hend.	speckled false dandelion	Idaho, Montana, Wyoming
Microseris nutans	(Hook.) Sch.Bip.	nodding microseris	Alberta, British Columbia, California, Colorado, Idaho, Montana, Nevada, Oregon, South Dakota, Utah, Washington, Wyoming
Microseris paludosa	(Greene) J.T.Howell	marsh silverpuffs	California
Microseris pygmaea	D.Don		Chile Central, Chile North, Peru
Microseris scapigera	Sch.Bip.	plains yam daisy	New Zealand South, Tasmania, Victoria
Microseris sylvatica	Sch.Bip.	sylvan scorzonella	California
Microseris troximoides	A.Gray	sagebrush false dandelion	British Columbia, California, Idaho, Montana, Nevada, Oregon, Utah, Washington, Wyoming
Microseris walteri	Gand.	murnong or yam daisy	New South Wales, Queensland, South Australia, Tasmania, Victoria, Western Australia
