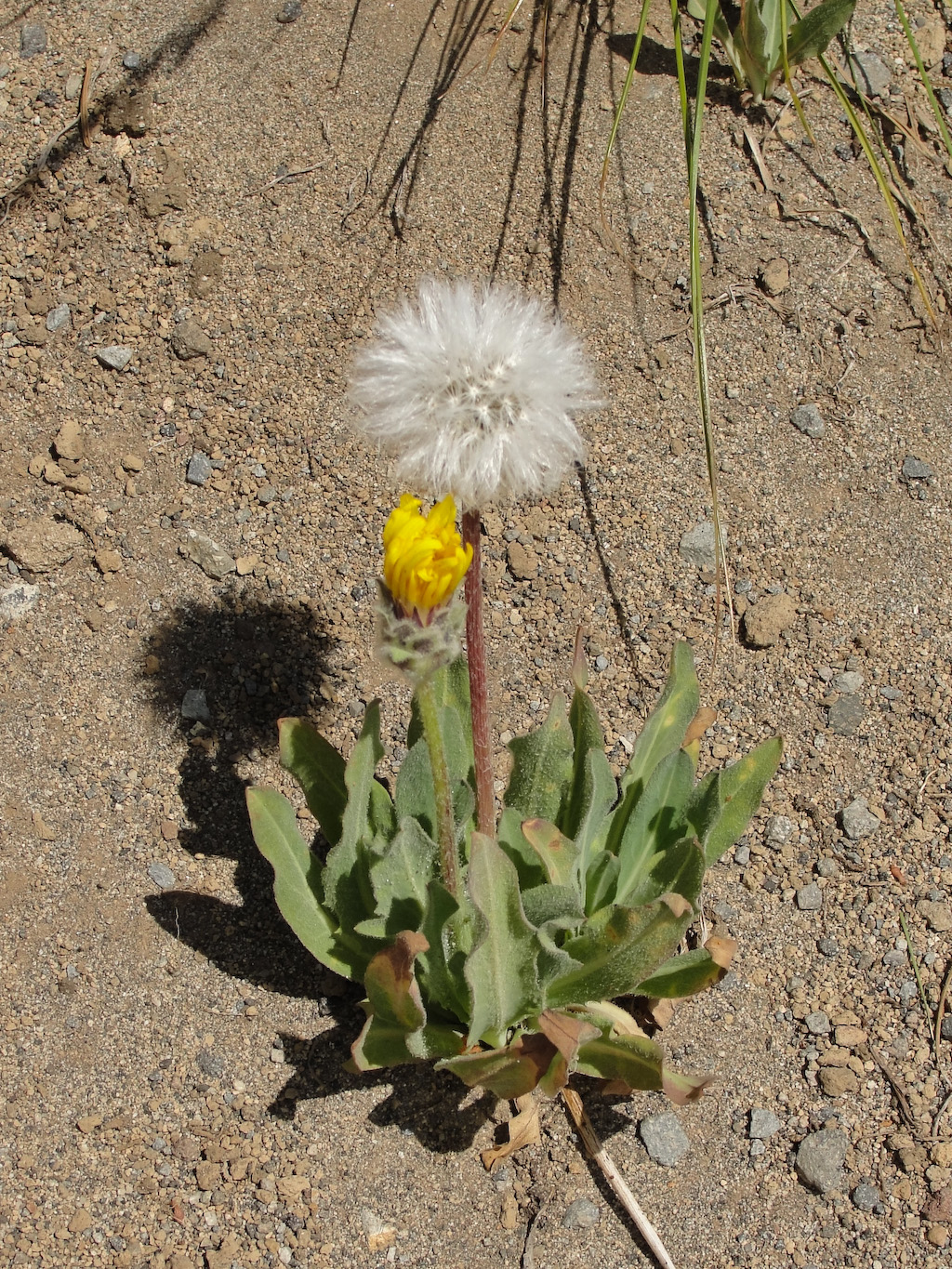
- Agoseris monticola

Scientific classification
- Kingdom: Plantae
- Clade: Embryophytes
- Clade: Tracheophytes
- Clade: Spermatophytes
- Clade: Angiosperms
- Clade: Eudicots
- Clade: Asterids
- Order: Asterales
- Family: Asteraceae
- Subfamily: Cichorioideae
- Tribe: Cichorieae
- Subtribe: Microseridinae
- Genus: Agoseris; Raf.

Synonyms
- Ammogeton Schrader; Cryptopleura Nuttall; Kymapleura Nuttall; Macrorhynchus Lessing; Stylopappus Nuttall; Trochoseris Endlicher; Troximon (sensu Nuttall, not Gaertn.)

= Agoseris =

Genus of flowering plants

Agoseris is a small genus of annual or perennial herbs in the family Asteraceae described as a genus in 1817.

Agoseris is native to North America, South America and the Falkland Islands.

In general appearance, Agoseris is reminiscent of dandelions and are sometimes called mountain dandelion or false dandelion. Like dandelions the plants are (mostly) stemless, the leaves forming a basal rosette, contain milky sap, produce several unbranched, stem-like flower stalks (peduncles), each flower stalk bearing a single, erect, liguliferous flower head that contains several florets, and the flower head maturing into a ball-like seed head of beaked achenes, each achene with a pappus of numerous, white bristles.

== Species ==
Accepted species

- Agoseris apargioides - seaside agoseris - CA OR WA
- Agoseris aurantiaca - orange agoseris - USA and Canada from Rocky Mountains to Pacific; also Quebec
- Agoseris chilensis - Chile
- Agoseris coronopifolia - Patagonian agoseris - Chile, Argentina, Falkland Islands
- Agoseris glauca - prairie agoseris - western USA + Canada from AK to Ont + NM
- Agoseris grandiflora - grassland agoseris - CA OR WA ID NV MT UT BC
- Agoseris heterophylla - annual agoseris - western USA + Canada + northwestern Mexico
- Agoseris hirsuta - Coast Range agoseris - CA
- Agoseris laevigata - Chile
- Agoseris × montana - North Park agoseris - CO WY
- Agoseris monticola - Sierra Nevada agoseris - CA OR WA ID NV BC
- Agoseris parviflora - steppe agoseris - western USA
- Agoseris pterocarpa - Argentina
- Agoseris retrorsa - spearleaf agoseris - CA OR WA NV UT

Hybrids

- Agoseris × agrestis (A. glauca × A. parviflora) - Front Range agoseris - UT CO
- Agoseris × dasycarpa (A. glauca × A. monticola) - Modoc agoseris - CA OR
- Agoseris × elata (A. aurantiaca × A. grandiflora) - Willamette agoseris - CA OR WA BC

Species formerly included

- Agoseris alpestris = Nothocalais alpestris
- Agoseris barbellulata = Nothocalais alpestris
- Agoseris cuspidata = Nothocalais cuspidata

== Distribution ==
Agoseris is one of several groups of flowering plants that have a New World amphitropical distribution (occurring in temperate regions of both North and South America). Most species are found in cordilleran regions of western North America, being distributed from southern Yukon Territory and the panhandle of Alaska southward to northern Baja California, Arizona, and New Mexico, and from the Pacific coast eastward to the northern Great Plains. Disjunct, isolated populations occur on the Gaspé Peninsula and Otish Mountains (Monts Otish) of Quebec, near the Hudson Bay in Ontario, and on hills near the Arctic Ocean in the Northwest Territories of Canada. One species is native to the southern Andes Mountains of Argentina and Chile, southward to Patagonia, Tierra del Fuego, and the Falkland Islands.
