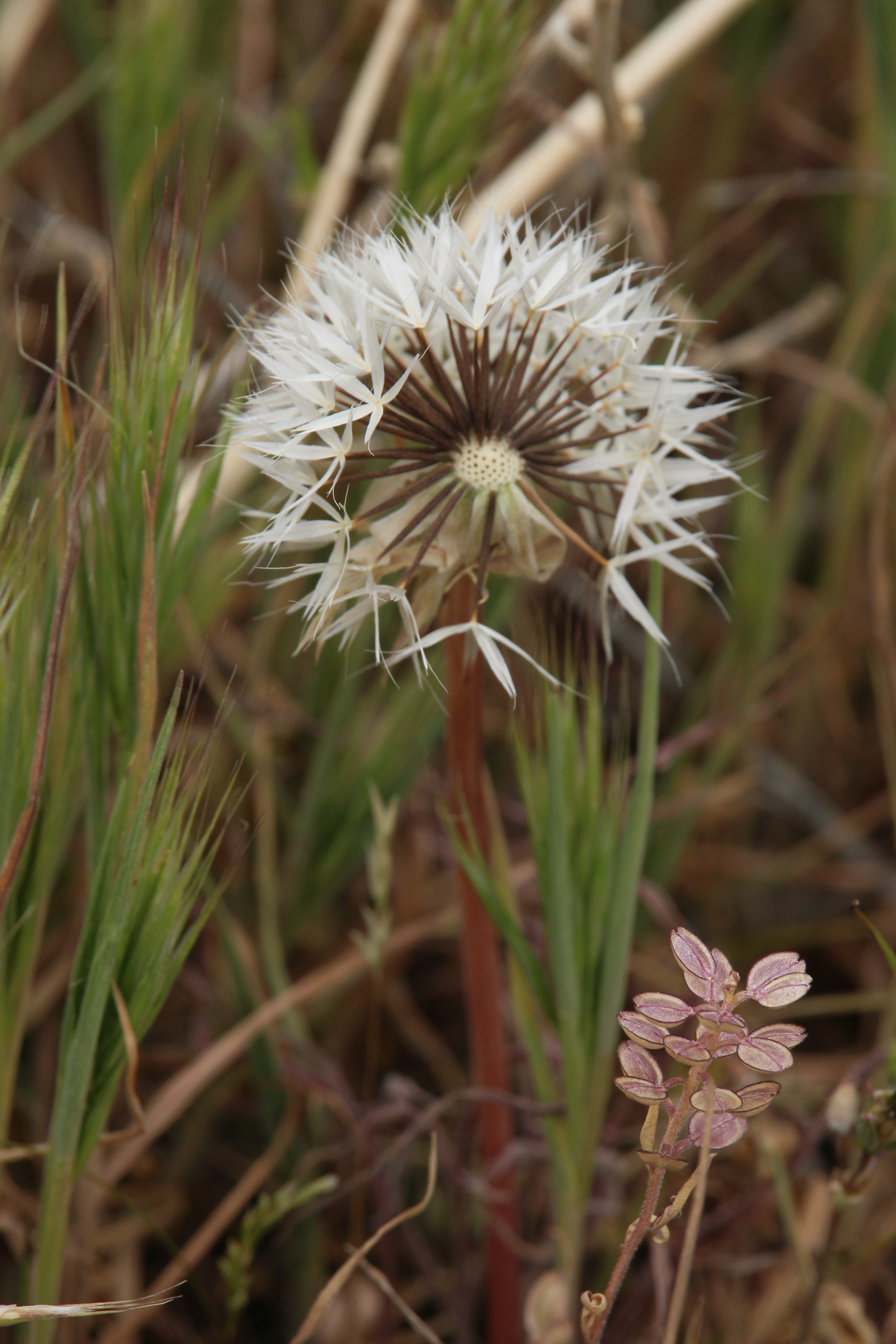
- Uropappus lindleyi

Scientific classification
- Kingdom: Plantae
- Clade: Embryophytes
- Clade: Tracheophytes
- Clade: Spermatophytes
- Clade: Angiosperms
- Clade: Eudicots
- Clade: Asterids
- Order: Asterales
- Family: Asteraceae
- Subfamily: Cichorioideae
- Tribe: Cichorieae
- Subtribe: Microseridinae
- Genus: Uropappus; Nutt.

Synonyms
- Microseris sect. Calocalais (DC.) A.Gray; Calais sect. Calocalais DC.

= Uropappus =

Genus of flowering plants

Uropappus, commonly called silverpuffs, is a genus of North American plants in the tribe Cichorieae within the family Asteraceae. Some authors accept only one species, U. lindleyi, and separate Stebbinsoseris.

Species

- Uropappus kellogii Greene - CA AZ, Baja California
- Uropappus lindleyi (DC.) Nutt. - Canada (BC), United States (WA OR CA NV ID UT AZ NM TX SC)
- Uropappus pruinosus Greene - NM

formerly included

- Uropappus clevelandii - Microseris heterocarpa
- Uropappus heterocarpus - Microseris heterocarpa
- Uropappus kelloggii - Microseris heterocarpa
- Uropappus leucocarpus - Microseris heterocarpa
