= A. glauca =

A. glauca may refer to:

- Abarema glauca, the glaucous abarema, a tree species found only in Cuba
- Agoseris glauca, the pale agoseris, prairie agoseris or short-beaked agoseris, a flowering plant species native to North America from Alaska to Ontario to New Mexico
- Arctostaphylos glauca, the bigberry manzanita, a tree species native to California and Baja California

== See also ==
- Glauca (disambiguation)
