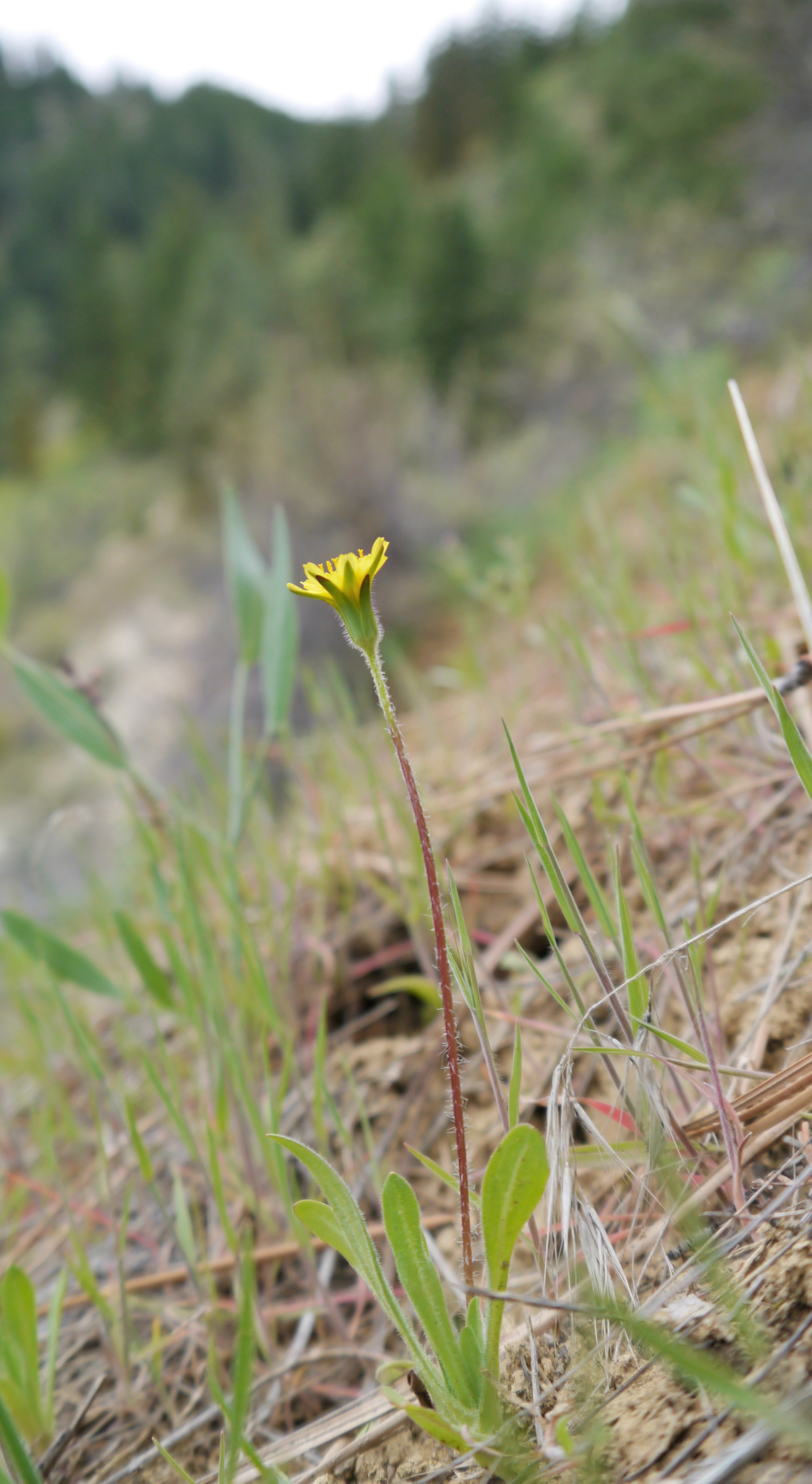

Scientific classification
- Kingdom: Plantae
- Clade: Tracheophytes
- Clade: Angiosperms
- Clade: Eudicots
- Clade: Asterids
- Order: Asterales
- Family: Asteraceae
- Genus: Agoseris
- Species: A. heterophylla

Binomial name
- Agoseris heterophylla (Nutt.) Greene

Synonyms
- Synonymy: Agoseris californica (Nutt.) Hoover; Agoseris greeneana Kuntze; Agoseris heterophylla (Nutt.) Jeps.; Agoseris major Jeps. ex Greene; Cryptopleura californica Nutt.; Kymapleura heterophylla (Nutt.) Nutt. ex Torr. & A.Gray; Microrhynchus californicus (Nutt.) Torr. & A.Gray; Microrhynchus heterophyllus Nutt.; Troximon elatum Greene; Troximon heterophyllum (Nutt.) Greene

= Agoseris heterophylla =

Species of flowering plant

Agoseris heterophylla is a liguliferous species in the family Asteraceae known by the common name annual agoseris or mountain dandelion. It is widespread in mostly drier regions of western North America from British Columbia to Baja California.

== Description ==
This is an annual herb producing a basal rosette of leaves. The oblanceolate leaves may be toothed, pinnatifid, or entire, and no larger than 15 cm long and 1.5 cm wide. Often there is no stem, or a short, rudimentary stem may develop, although the plant will produce several stem-like peduncles. Each solitary flower head contains one or two rows of sharp-pointed bracts, often with purplish hairs; and a corolla of yellow ray florets, but no disc florets. The fruit is an achene which can be highly variable but typically has a long beak and a terminal pappus of white bristles. Flowers bloom March to September.

Varieties

- Agoseris heterophylla var. cryptopleura - California
- Agoseris heterophylla var. heterophylla - British Columbia to Baja California (including Guadalupe Island)
- Agoseris heterophylla var. quentinii - Arizona, New Mexico
