= Microseris acuminata =

Scientific classification
- Kingdom: Plantae
- Clade: Tracheophytes
- Clade: Angiosperms
- Clade: Eudicots
- Clade: Asterids
- Order: Asterales
- Family: Asteraceae
- Genus: Microseris
- Species: M. acuminata

Binomial name
- Microseris acuminata Greene

Species of flowering plant

Microseris acuminata is a species of flowering plant in the family Asteraceae known by the common name Sierra foothill silverpuffs. It is native to the Central Valley of California and the mountain ranges, including the Sierra Nevada, surrounding it. There is a disjunct occurrence in Jackson County, Oregon. The plant grows in grassy habitat, woodlands, and sometimes the edges of vernal pools.

== Description ==
It is an annual herb growing 5 to 35 centimeters tall from a basal rosette of erect leaves; there is no true stem. Each leaf is up to 20 centimeters long and has edges lined in comblike narrow lobes. The inflorescence is borne on an erect, curving, or drooping peduncle. The flower head contains up to 50 flat ray florets. The distinctive fruit is an achene with a brown, hairless body about half a centimeter long. At the tip of the body is a large pappus made up of five long, jointed scales each up to a centimeter in length and lined with bristles and hairs.
