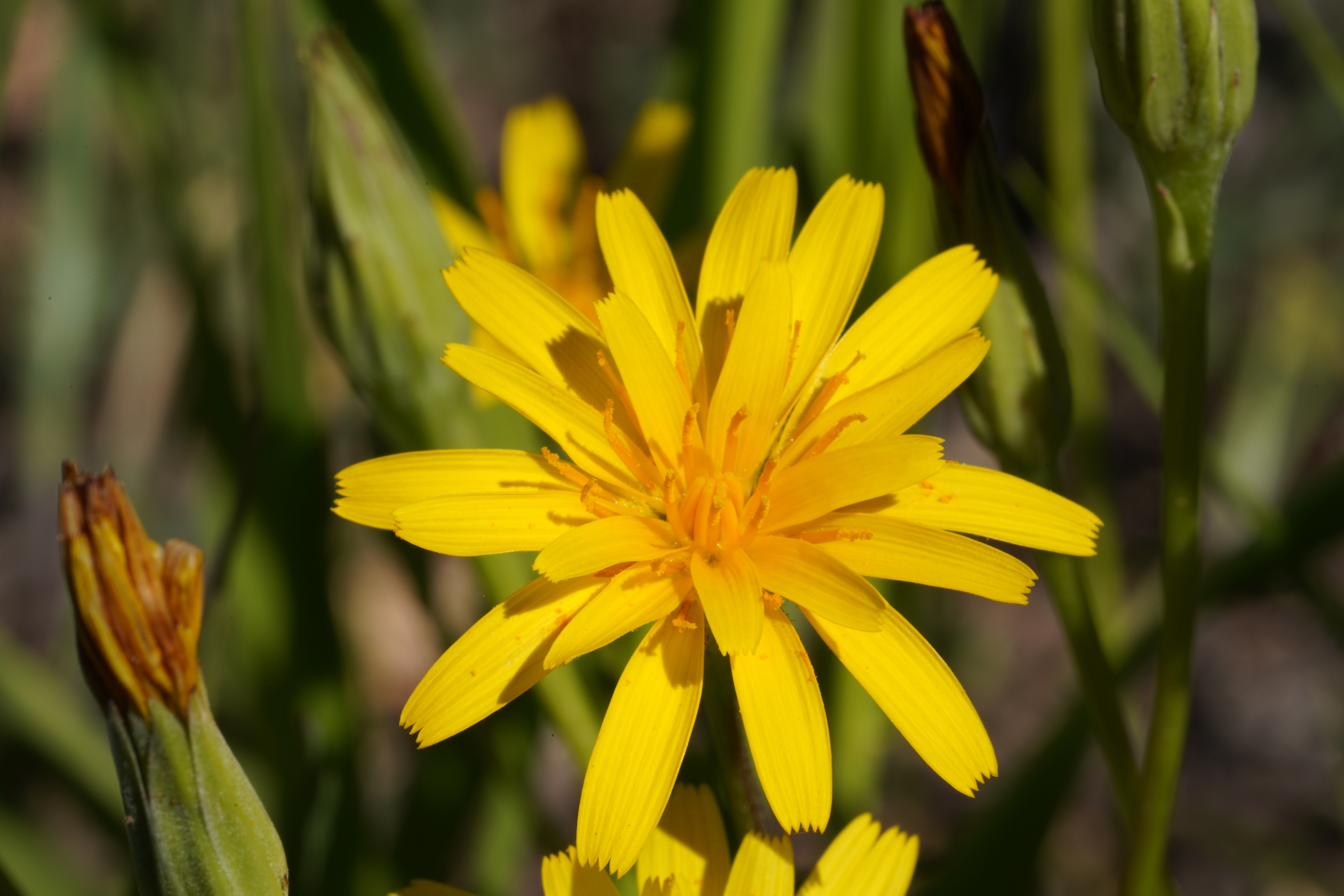
- Microseris nutans in Fossil Butte National Monument, Wyoming

Conservation status
- Secure (NatureServe)

Scientific classification
- Kingdom: Plantae
- Clade: Tracheophytes
- Clade: Angiosperms
- Clade: Eudicots
- Clade: Asterids
- Order: Asterales
- Family: Asteraceae
- Genus: Microseris
- Species: M. nutans

Binomial name
- Microseris nutans (Hook.) Sch.Bip.

= Microseris nutans =

Species of flowering plant

Microseris nutans is a species of flowering plant in the family Asteraceae known by the common name nodding microseris. It is native to western North America, including southwestern Canada and much of the western United States, including the Sierra Nevada in California, where it grows in many types of habitat.

== Description ==
The plant is variable in appearance. In general, it is a perennial herb growing up to 70 centimeters tall with a branching stem. The plentiful leaves are up to 30 centimeters in length and generally toothed or lobed along the edges.

The somewhat hairy inflorescence is borne on an erect or upright peduncle. The often nodding flower head contains up to 50 yellow ray florets. The fruit is an achene with a brownish or reddish body a few millimeters long. At the tip of the body is a large pappus made up of 15 to 30 silvery, hairy scales.
