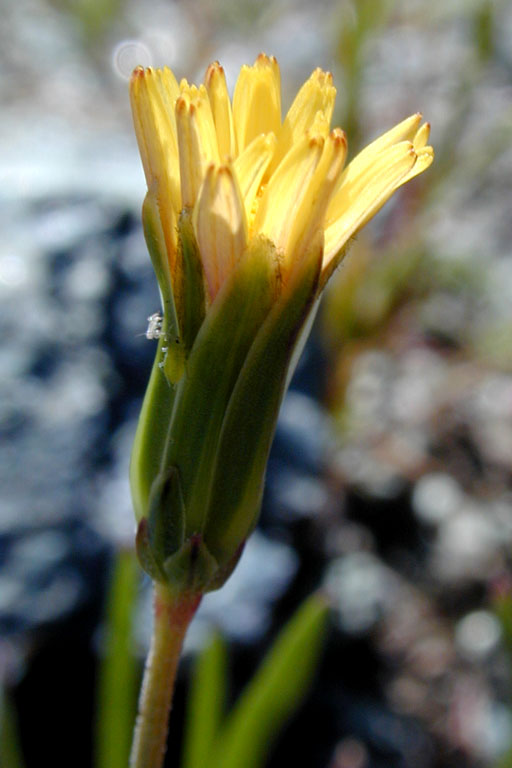

Scientific classification
- Kingdom: Plantae
- Clade: Tracheophytes
- Clade: Angiosperms
- Clade: Eudicots
- Clade: Asterids
- Order: Asterales
- Family: Asteraceae
- Genus: Microseris
- Species: M. douglasii

Binomial name
- Microseris douglasii (DC.) Sch.Bip.

= Microseris douglasii =

Species of flowering plant

Microseris douglasii is a species of flowering plant in the family Asteraceae known by the common name Douglas' silverpuffs. It is native to western North America from Oregon and California to Baja California. It grows in several types of habitat, including grassland and vernal pools, and on soils containing clay and serpentine.

== Description ==
Microseris douglasii is plant is variable in appearance. In general it is an annual herb growing 5 centimeters to over half a meter tall from a basal rosette of leaves; there is usually no true stem. Each leaf is up to 25 centimeters long and has edges which are smooth, toothed, or divided into many lobes.

The inflorescence is borne on an erect or curving peduncle arising from ground level. The flower head contains up to 200 white or yellow ray florets. The fruit is an achene with a brown to nearly black, sometimes speckled body up to a centimeter long. At the tip of the body is a large pappus made up of about five long, bristly, barbed scales.

== See also ==
- Microseris heterocarpa, thought to be a hybrid of this species
