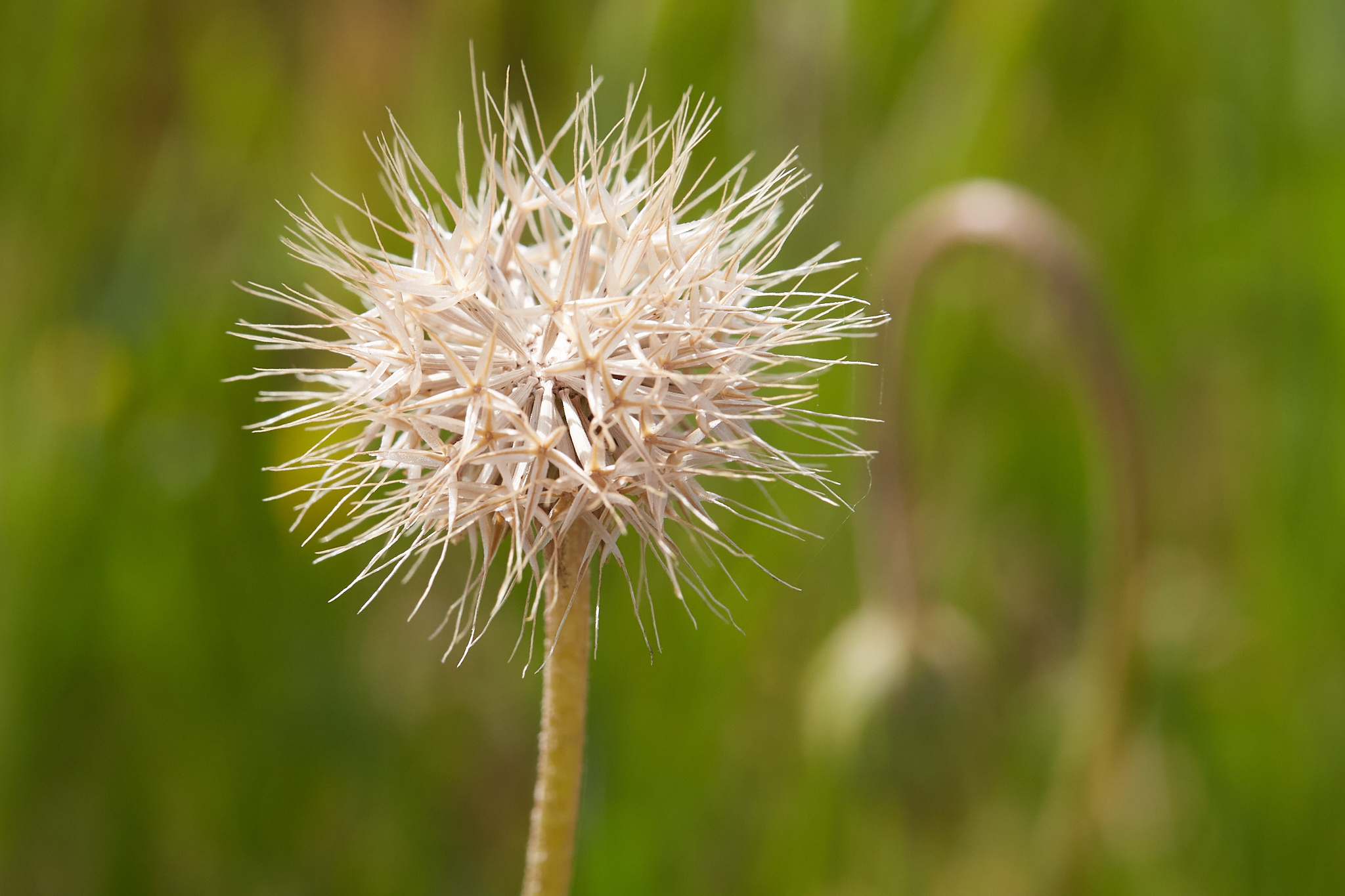

Scientific classification
- Kingdom: Plantae
- Clade: Tracheophytes
- Clade: Angiosperms
- Clade: Eudicots
- Clade: Asterids
- Order: Asterales
- Family: Asteraceae
- Genus: Microseris
- Species: M. campestris

Binomial name
- Microseris campestris Greene

= Microseris campestris =

Species of flowering plant

Microseris campestris is a species of flowering plant in the family Asteraceae known by the common name San Joaquin silverpuffs. It is endemic to California, where it grows in the San Joaquin Valley and adjacent Sierra Nevada foothills, and the central California Coast Ranges. It is a resident of grassland and open slope habitats, sometimes near vernal pools.

== Description ==
Microseris campestris is an annual herb growing up to half a meter-1.5 feet tall from a basal rosette of erect leaves; there is no true stem. Each leaf is up to 20 centimeters long and has edges divided into many lobes.

The inflorescence is borne on a peduncle arising from ground level. The flower head contains up to 100 white or yellow ray florets. The fruit is an achene with a gray or brown, sometimes speckled body a few millimeters long. At the tip of the body is a large pappus made up of five long, bristly scales.
