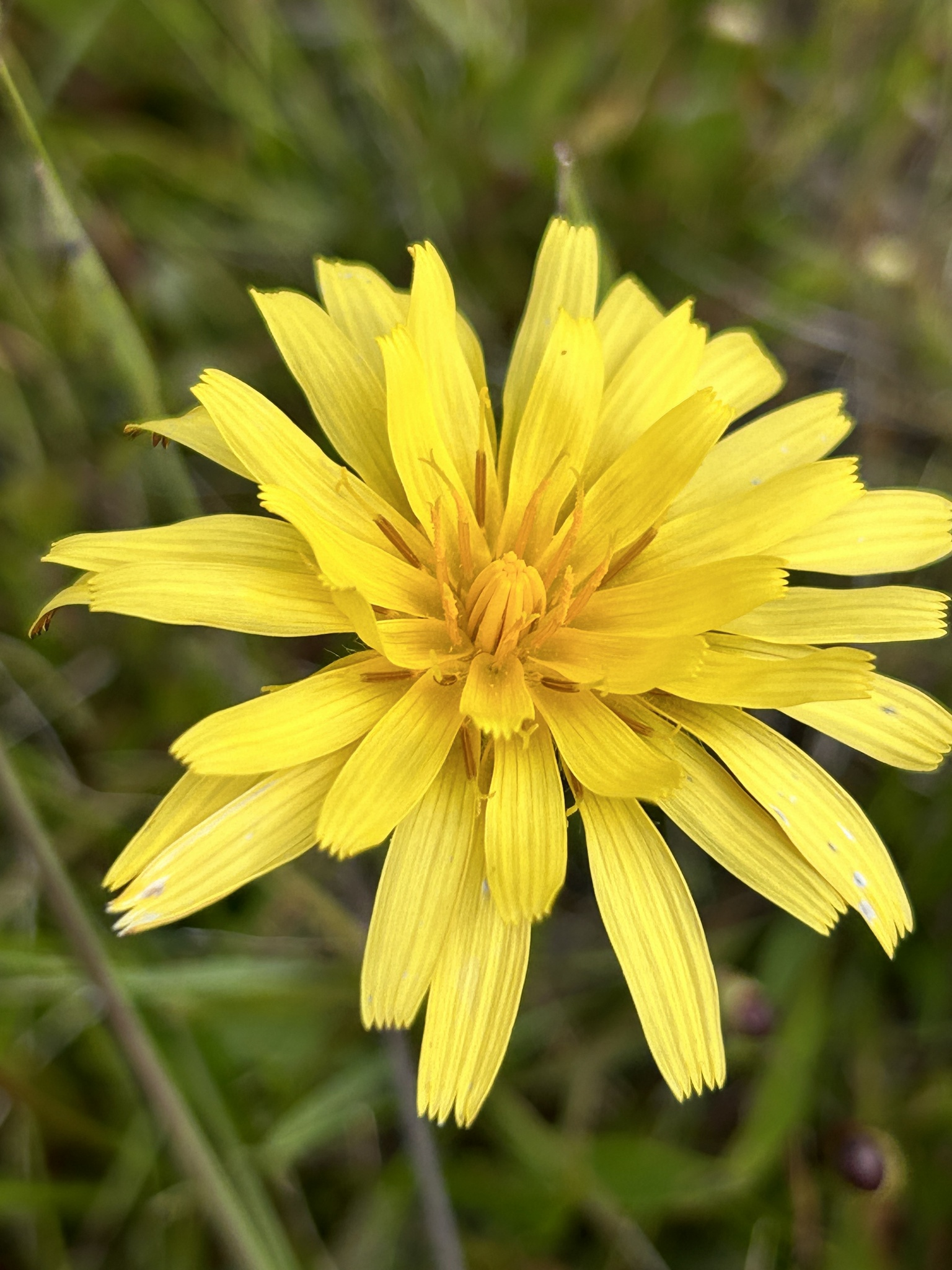

Conservation status
- Imperiled (NatureServe)

Scientific classification
- Kingdom: Plantae
- Clade: Tracheophytes
- Clade: Angiosperms
- Clade: Eudicots
- Clade: Asterids
- Order: Asterales
- Family: Asteraceae
- Genus: Microseris
- Species: M. paludosa

Binomial name
- Microseris paludosa (Greene) J.T.Howell

= Microseris paludosa =

Species of flowering plant

Microseris paludosa is a species of flowering plant in the family Asteraceae known by the common names marsh silverpuffs and marsh microseris. It is endemic to California, where it has a scattered distribution between southern Mendocino and northern San Luis Obispo Counties, mainly near the coast. Its habitat includes coastal scrub and grassland and coniferous forest.

== Description ==
This is a perennial herb growing up to 70 centimeters tall with a branching stem. The leaves are up to 35 centimeters in length and smooth, toothed or lobed along the edges. The somewhat hairy inflorescence is borne on an erect or curving peduncle. The flower head contains up to 70 yellow ray florets.

The fruit is an achene with a whitish body a few millimeters long. At the tip of the body is a large pappus made up of 5 to 10 long, bristly scales.
