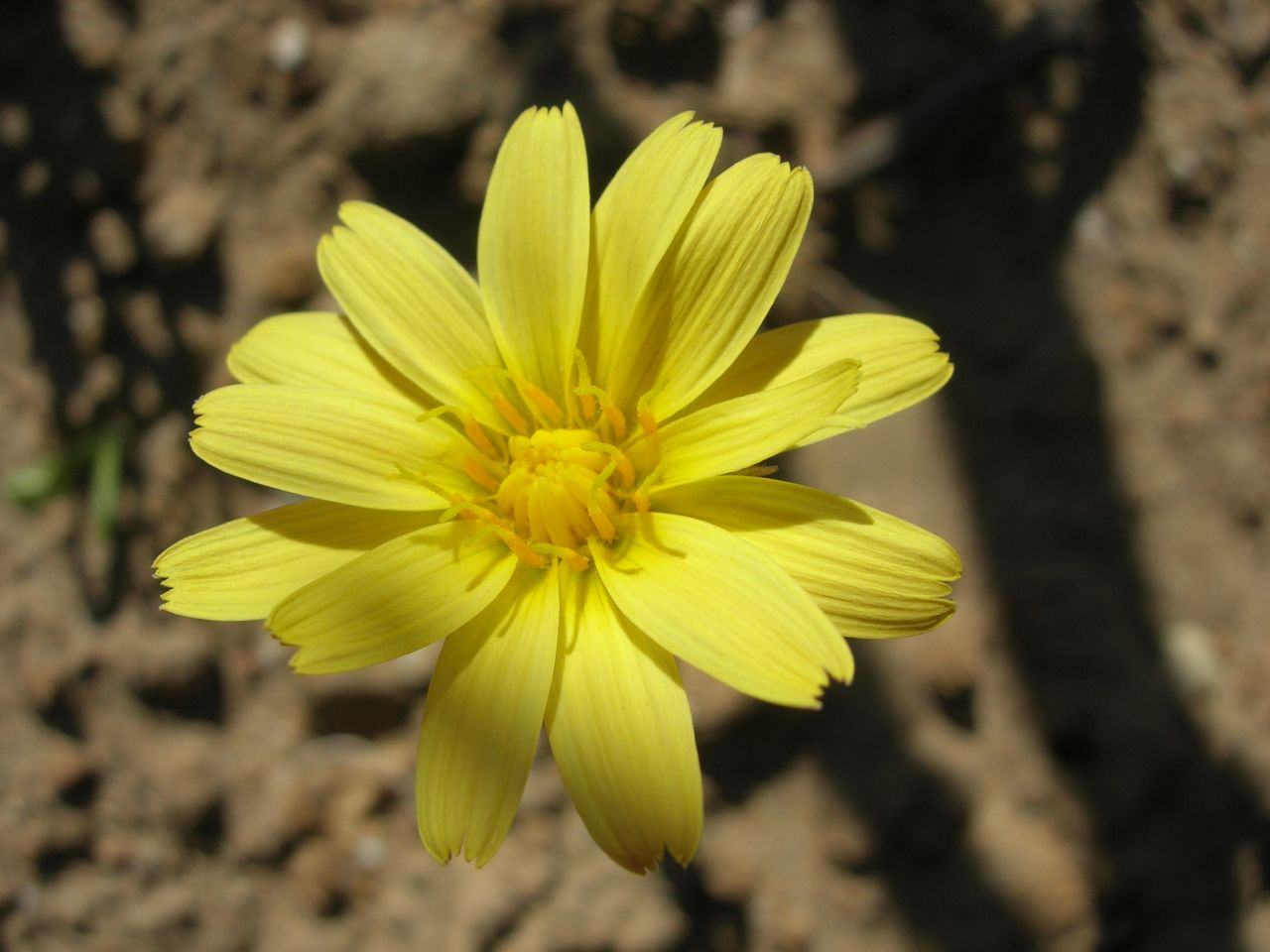

Scientific classification
- Kingdom: Plantae
- Clade: Tracheophytes
- Clade: Angiosperms
- Clade: Eudicots
- Clade: Asterids
- Order: Asterales
- Family: Asteraceae
- Genus: Microseris
- Species: M. sylvatica

Binomial name
- Microseris sylvatica (Benth.) Sch.Bip.

= Microseris sylvatica =

Species of flowering plant

Microseris sylvatica is a species of flowering plant in the family Asteraceae known by the common names sylvan scorzonella and woodland silverpuffs. It is endemic to California, where it has a scattered distribution throughout the central California Coast Ranges and inland mountain ranges, including the Sierra Nevada of the state. Its habitat includes grassland and openings in wooded areas.

== Description ==
This is a perennial herb growing up to 75 centimeters tall. The leaves are up to 35 centimeters in length and wavy, toothed, or lobed along the edges. The inflorescence is borne on an erect peduncle, the flower head containing up to 70 yellow ray florets.

The fruit is an achene with a pale body up to a centimeter long. At the tip of the body is a large pappus made up of several long, barbed, bristly scales each up to a centimeter in length themselves.
