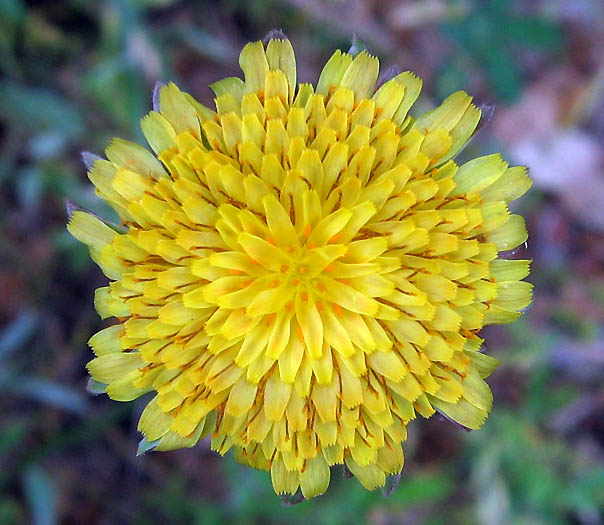
- Agoseris grandiflora var. grandiflora

Scientific classification
- Kingdom: Plantae
- Clade: Tracheophytes
- Clade: Angiosperms
- Clade: Eudicots
- Clade: Asterids
- Order: Asterales
- Family: Asteraceae
- Genus: Agoseris
- Species: A. grandiflora

Binomial name
- Agoseris grandiflora (Nutt.) Greene

Synonyms
- Synonymy: Agoseris cinerea Greene; Agoseris intermedia Greene; Agoseris marshallii (Greene) Kuntze; Agoseris marshallii (Greene) Greene; Agoseris obtusifolia (Suksd.) Rydb.; Agoseris plebeia (Greene) Greene; Microrhynchus grandiflorus (Nutt.) Torr. & A.Gray; Stylopappus grandiflorus Nutt.; Troximon grandiflorum (Nutt.) A.Gray; Troximon marshallii Greene; Troximon plebeium Greene

= Agoseris grandiflora =

Species of flowering plant

Agoseris grandiflora is a North American species of flowering plant in the family Asteraceae known by the common names California dandelion, bigflower agoseris, and grassland agoseris.

The plant is native to western North America from British Columbia to California to Utah, where it grows in many habitat types.

== Description ==
Agoseris grandiflora is a perennial herb producing a basal patch of leaves of various shapes reaching maximum lengths of 50 centimeters. There is usually no stem, but there is sometimes a rudimentary one.

The upright part of the plant is actually the peduncle of the inflorescence, which can approach a meter in height. It is coated in soft white hairs.

The flower head at the top is up to 4 centimeters wide and lined with reddish or purplish green phyllaries with curling tips. The head is ligulate, containing many yellow ray florets but no disc florets.

The fruit is an achene which may be nearly 3 centimeters long, including a long beak and long white pappus. It grows in meadows and forest openings.

== Varieties ==
- Agoseris grandiflora var. grandiflora
- Agoseris grandiflora var. leptophylla
