= Microseris elegans =

Scientific classification
- Kingdom: Plantae
- Clade: Tracheophytes
- Clade: Angiosperms
- Clade: Eudicots
- Clade: Asterids
- Order: Asterales
- Family: Asteraceae
- Genus: Microseris
- Species: M. elegans

Binomial name
- Microseris elegans Greene ex A.Gray

Species of flowering plant

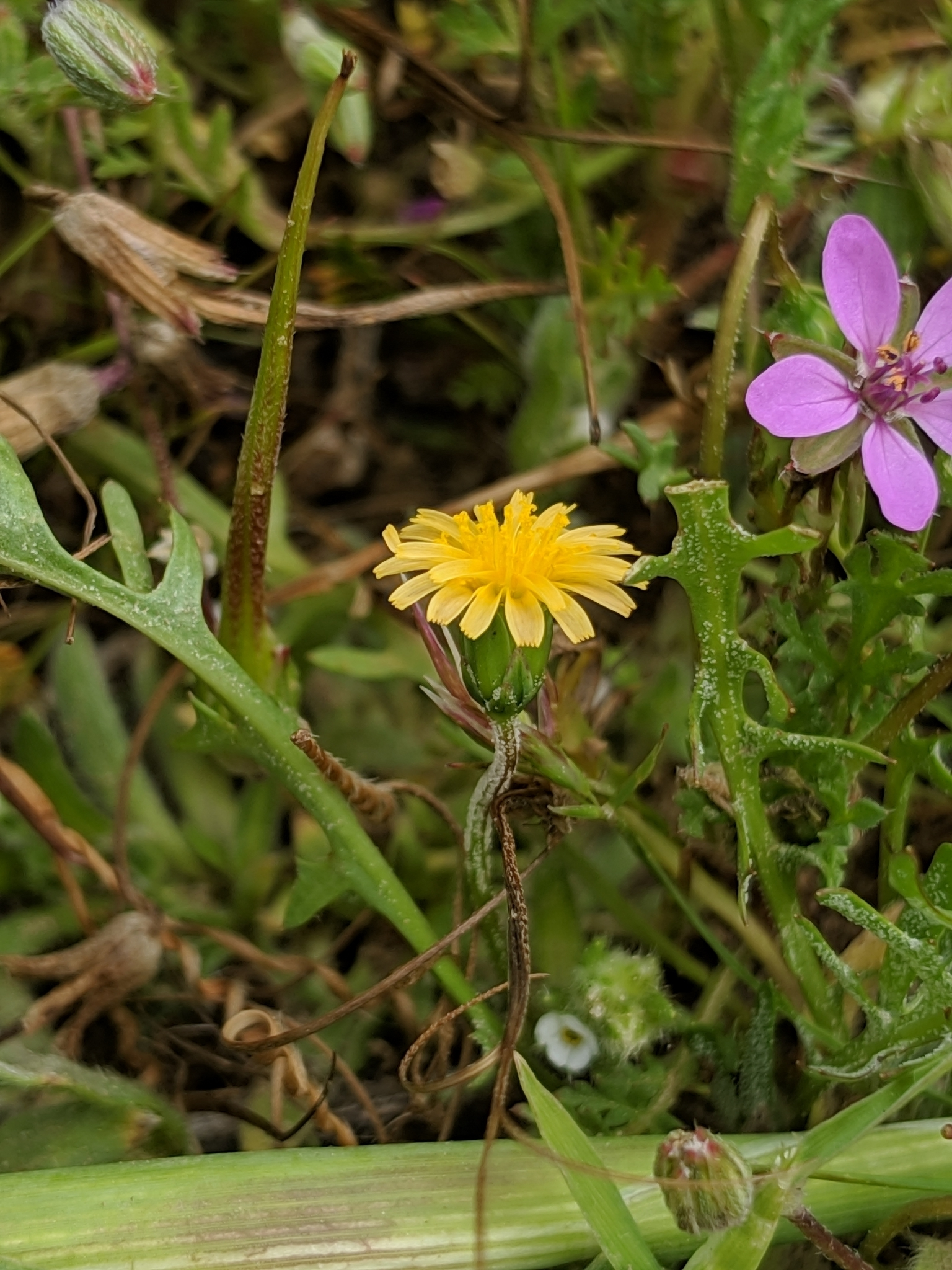

Microseris elegans is a species of flowering plant in the family Asteraceae known by the common name elegant silverpuffs. It is native to California and Baja California, where it grows in the valleys, foothills, and coastal mountain ranges. Its habitat includes grassland, sometimes near vernal pools, and especially clay soils.

== Description ==
It is an annual herb growing up to 35 centimeters tall from a basal rosette of erect leaves; there is no true stem. Each leaf is up to 20 centimeters long and has edges which are smooth, toothed, or divided into many lobes. The inflorescence is borne on an erect or curving peduncle arising from ground level. The flower head contains up to 100 orange or yellow ray florets.

The fruit is an achene with a brown to nearly black body a few millimeters long. At the tip of the body is a large pappus made up of five long, flat, barbed scales.
