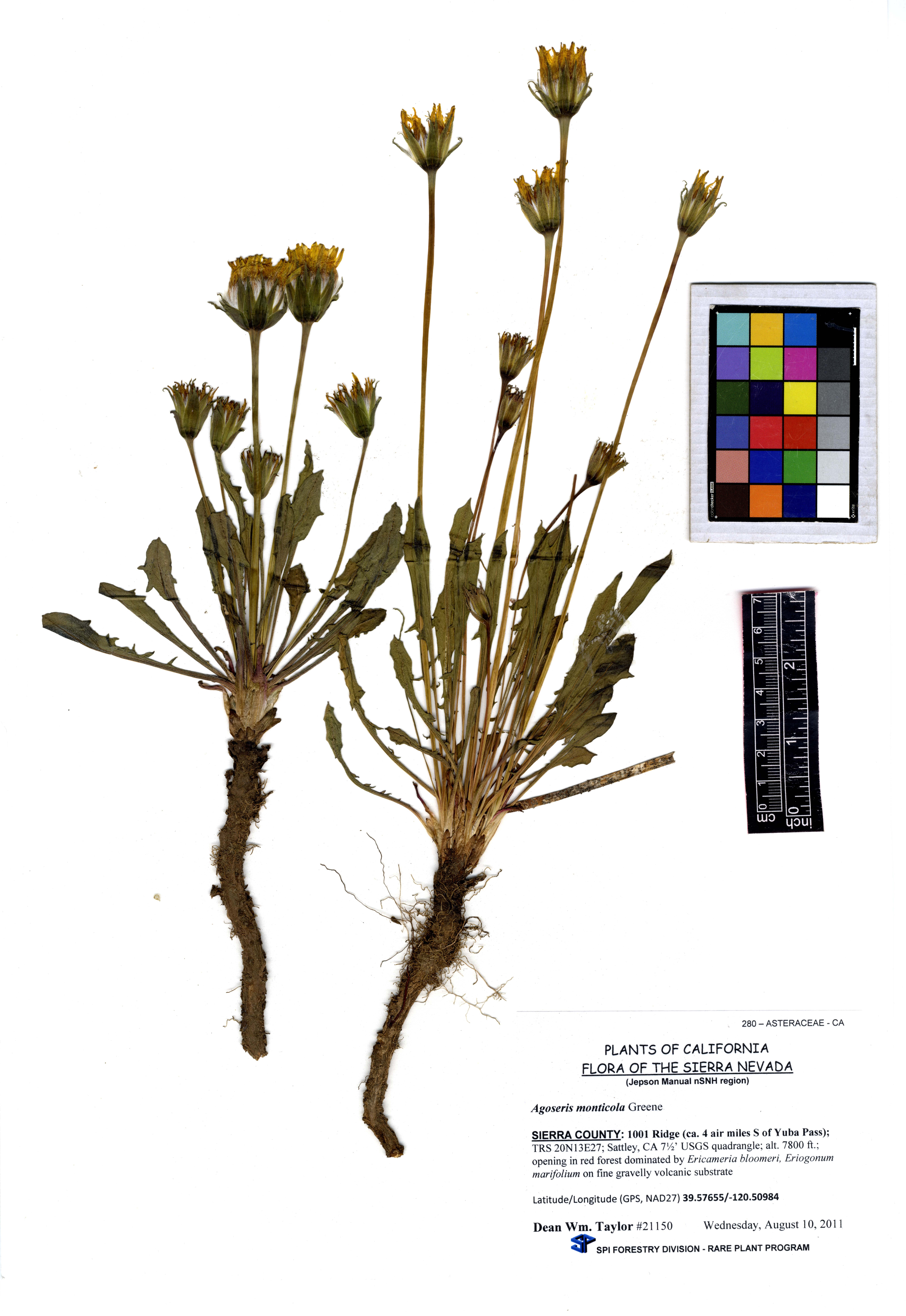
- Herbarium specimen

Scientific classification
- Kingdom: Plantae
- Clade: Tracheophytes
- Clade: Angiosperms
- Clade: Eudicots
- Clade: Asterids
- Order: Asterales
- Family: Asteraceae
- Genus: Agoseris
- Species: A. monticola

Binomial name
- Agoseris monticola Greene

Synonyms
- Agoseris covillei Greene; Agoseris decumbens Greene

= Agoseris monticola =

Species of flowering plant

Agoseris monticola is a North American species of flowering plants in the family Asteraceae known by the common name Sierra Nevada agoseris or Sierra Nevada mountain dandelion. It grows in the mountains of the western United States, primarily the Cascade Range and Sierra Nevada, but also on other mountains in Nevada and Idaho.

== Description ==
Agoseris monticola resembles the common dandelion (Taraxacum officinale) in having no leafy stems, only a rosette of leaves close to the ground. There is a single flower head with many yellow ray florets but no disc florets.
