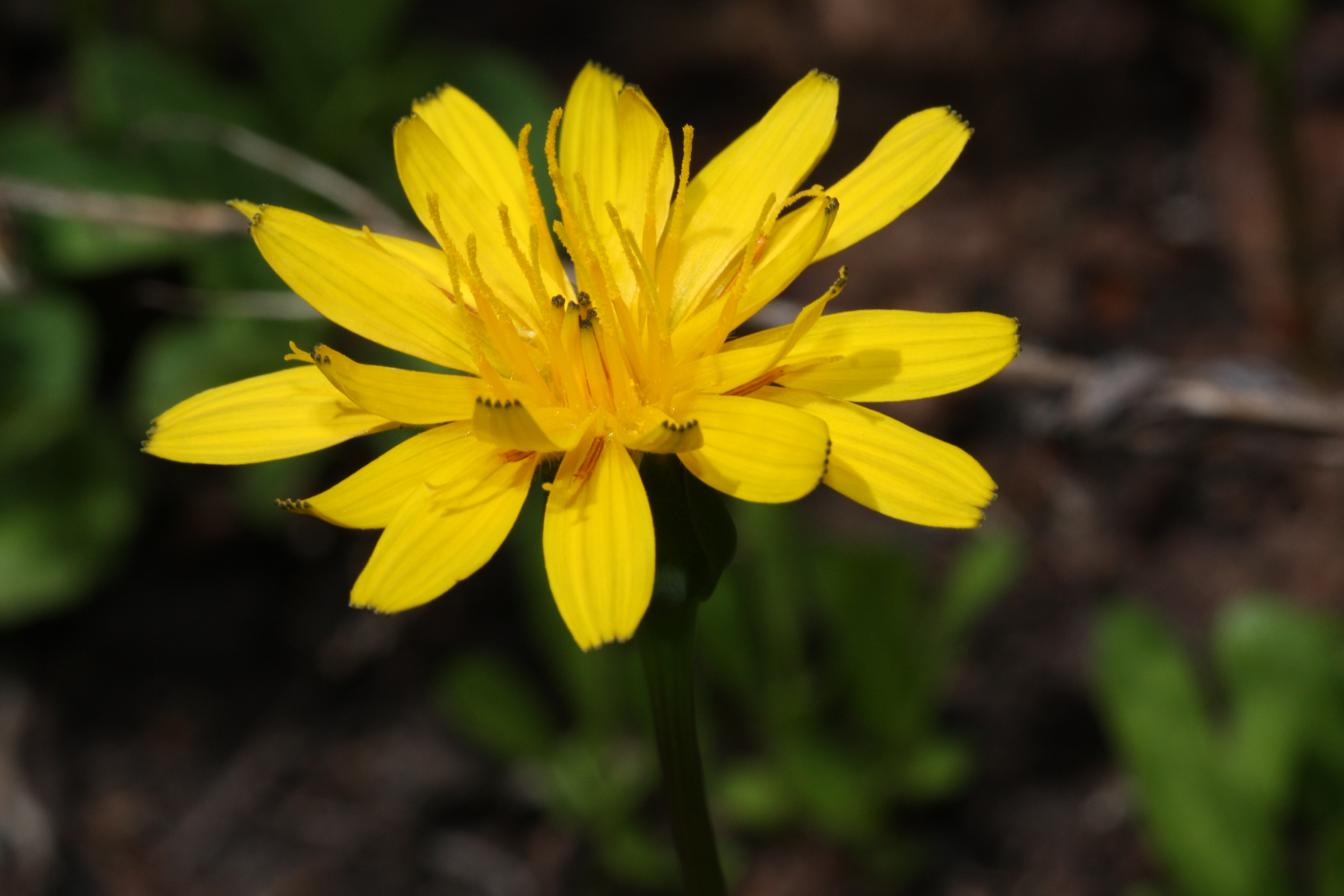
- Nothocalais alpestris

Scientific classification
- Kingdom: Plantae
- Clade: Tracheophytes
- Clade: Angiosperms
- Clade: Eudicots
- Clade: Asterids
- Order: Asterales
- Family: Asteraceae
- Subfamily: Cichorioideae
- Tribe: Cichorieae
- Subtribe: Microseridinae
- Genus: Nothocalais (A.Gray) Greene

Type species
- Nothocalais troximoides (A.Gray) Greene

Synonyms
- Microseris sect. Nothocalais A.Gray

= Nothocalais =

Genus of flowering plants

Nothocalais is a genus of North American flowering plants in the tribe Cichorieae within the family Asteraceae. There are known generally as false dandelions or false agoseris.

As of 2023 all four of these species are classified in Nothocalis by the USDA Natural Resources Conservation Service PLANTS database (PLANTS) and Flora of North America (FNA). Only Nothocalais nigrescens is in Nothocalis according to World Flora Online (WFO) However, Plants of the World Online (POWO) synonymizes genus Nothocalais into Microseris.

Species

- Nothocalais alpestris - alpine lake false dandelion - CA WA OR
- Nothocalais cuspidata - prairie false dandelion - ALB SAS MAN MT WY NM ND SD NE KS OK TX MN IA MO IL WI NY
- Nothocalais nigrescens - speckled false dandelion - ID MT WY
- Nothocalais troximoides - sagebrush false dandelion - BC WA OR CA ID NV UT WY MT
