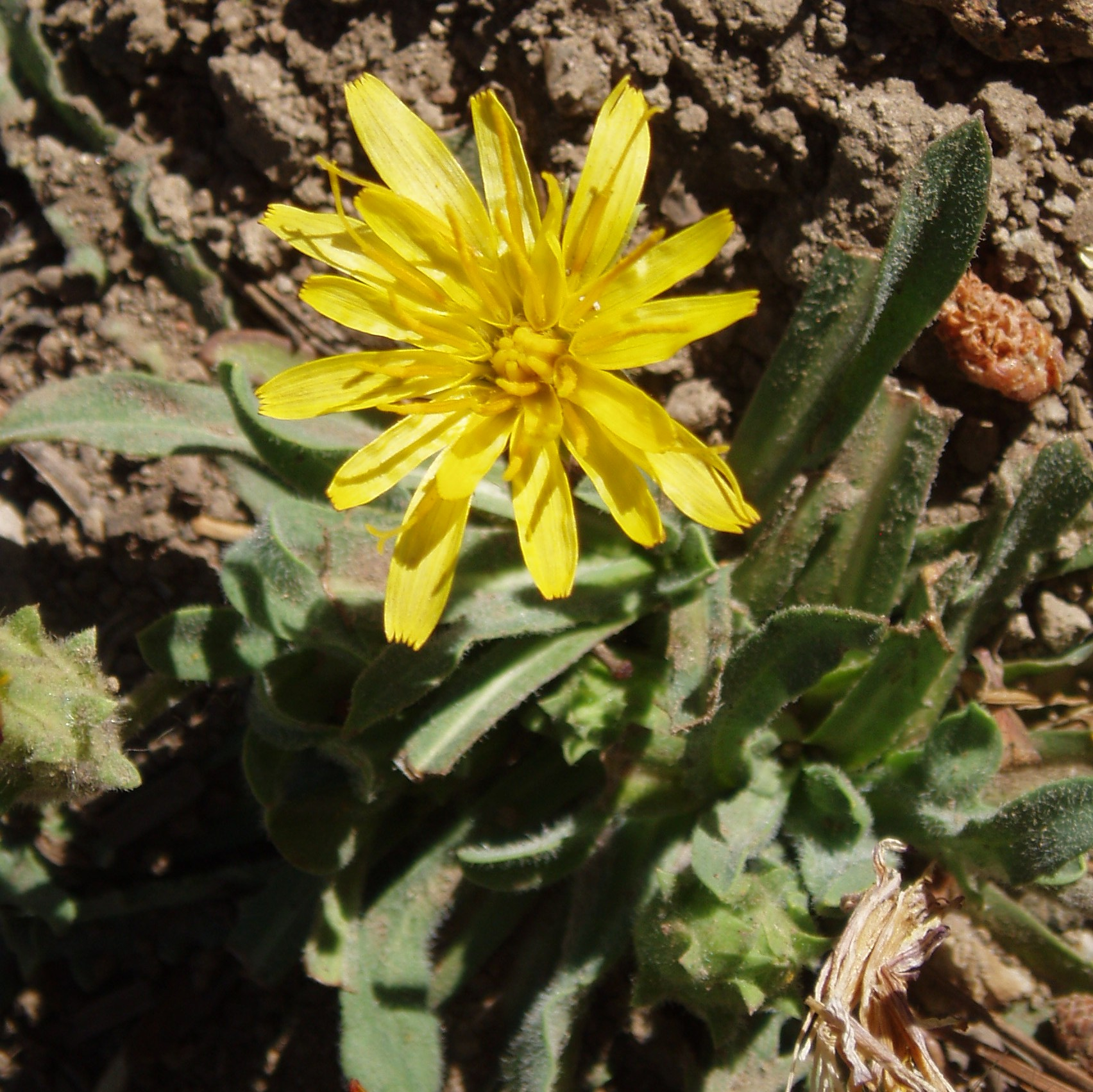

Scientific classification
- Kingdom: Plantae
- Clade: Tracheophytes
- Clade: Angiosperms
- Clade: Eudicots
- Clade: Asterids
- Order: Asterales
- Family: Asteraceae
- Genus: Agoseris
- Species: A. retrorsa

Binomial name
- Agoseris retrorsa (Benth.) Greene

Synonyms
- Microrhynchus angustifolius Kellogg; Microrhynchus retrorsus Benth.; Troximon retrorsum (Benth.) A.Gray

= Agoseris retrorsa =

Species of flowering plant

Agoseris retrorsa is a North American species of flowering plant in the family Asteraceae known by the common name spearleaf agoseris or spearleaf mountain dandelion.

It is native to western North America from Washington to Utah to Baja California, where it grows in many types of habitat, including chaparral, scrub, and coniferous forest.

== Description ==
Agoseris retrorsa is a perennial herb forming a base of leaves about a number of erect, thick, wool-coated inflorescences up to half a meter in height. The narrow leaves are linear to lance-shaped, and spearlike with curving toothlike lobes along the edges.

The inflorescence bears a single flower head which is several centimeters wide when fully open. It is lined with woolly, pointed phyllaries which are green, often with reddish purple longitudinal streaks or stripes. The flower head contains many golden yellow ray florets, the outer ones usually darker in color.

The fruit is an achene with a plumelike pappus of white bristles.
