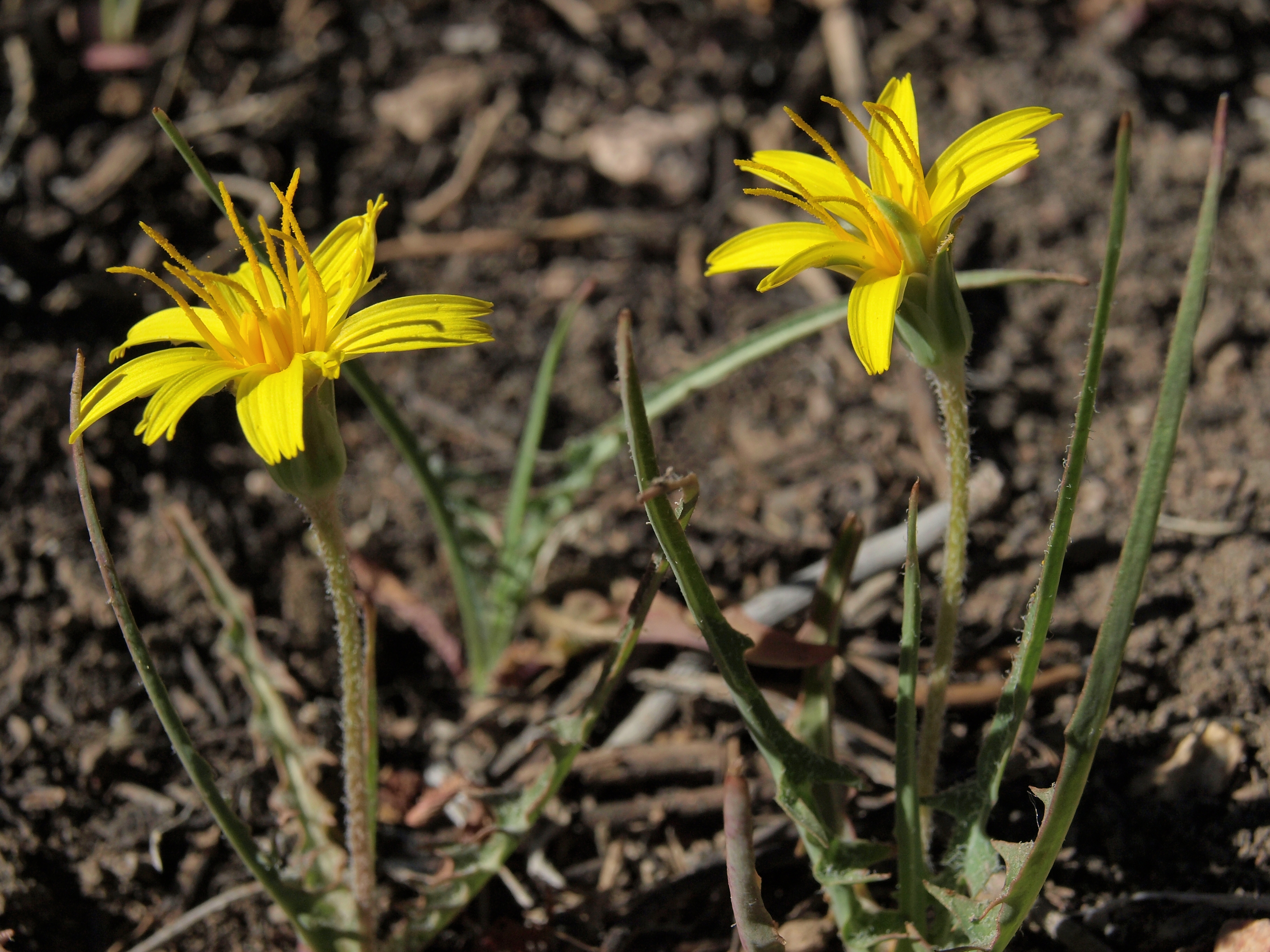

Conservation status
- Apparently Secure (NatureServe)

Scientific classification
- Kingdom: Plantae
- Clade: Tracheophytes
- Clade: Angiosperms
- Clade: Eudicots
- Clade: Asterids
- Order: Asterales
- Family: Asteraceae
- Genus: Agoseris
- Species: A. parviflora

Binomial name
- Agoseris parviflora (Nutt.) D.Dietr.

Synonyms
- Synonymy: Agoseris caudata Greene; Agoseris dens-leonis Greene; Agoseris leontodon Rydb.; Agoseris leptocarpa Osterh.; Agoseris parviflora (Nutt.) Greene; Agoseris rosea (Nutt.) Greene; Agoseris rosea (Nutt.) D.Dietr.; Agoseris taraxacifolia (Nutt.) D.Dietr.; Agoseris taraxacoides Greene; Agoseris tomentosa Howell; Troximon laciniatum (D.C.Eaton) A.Gray; Troximon parviflorum Nutt.; Troximon roseum Nutt.; Troximon taraxacifolium Nutt.

= Agoseris parviflora =

Species of flowering plant

Agoseris parviflora is a North American species of flowering plants in the family Asteraceae known by the common name Steppe agoseris or sagebrush agoseris or false dandelion. It is found in the Western United States primarily in the Great Basin and the region drained by the Colorado River but also in the eastern foothills of the Sierra Nevada and on the western edge of the Great Plains. Its range extends from eastern Oregon and eastern California to Wyoming, Colorado, and New Mexico, with a few isolated populations in western Kansas and western South Dakota.

== Description ==
Agoseris parviflora resembles the common dandelion (Taraxacum officinale) in having no leafy stems, only a rosette of leaves close to the ground. There is a single flower head with many yellow ray florets but no disc florets.
