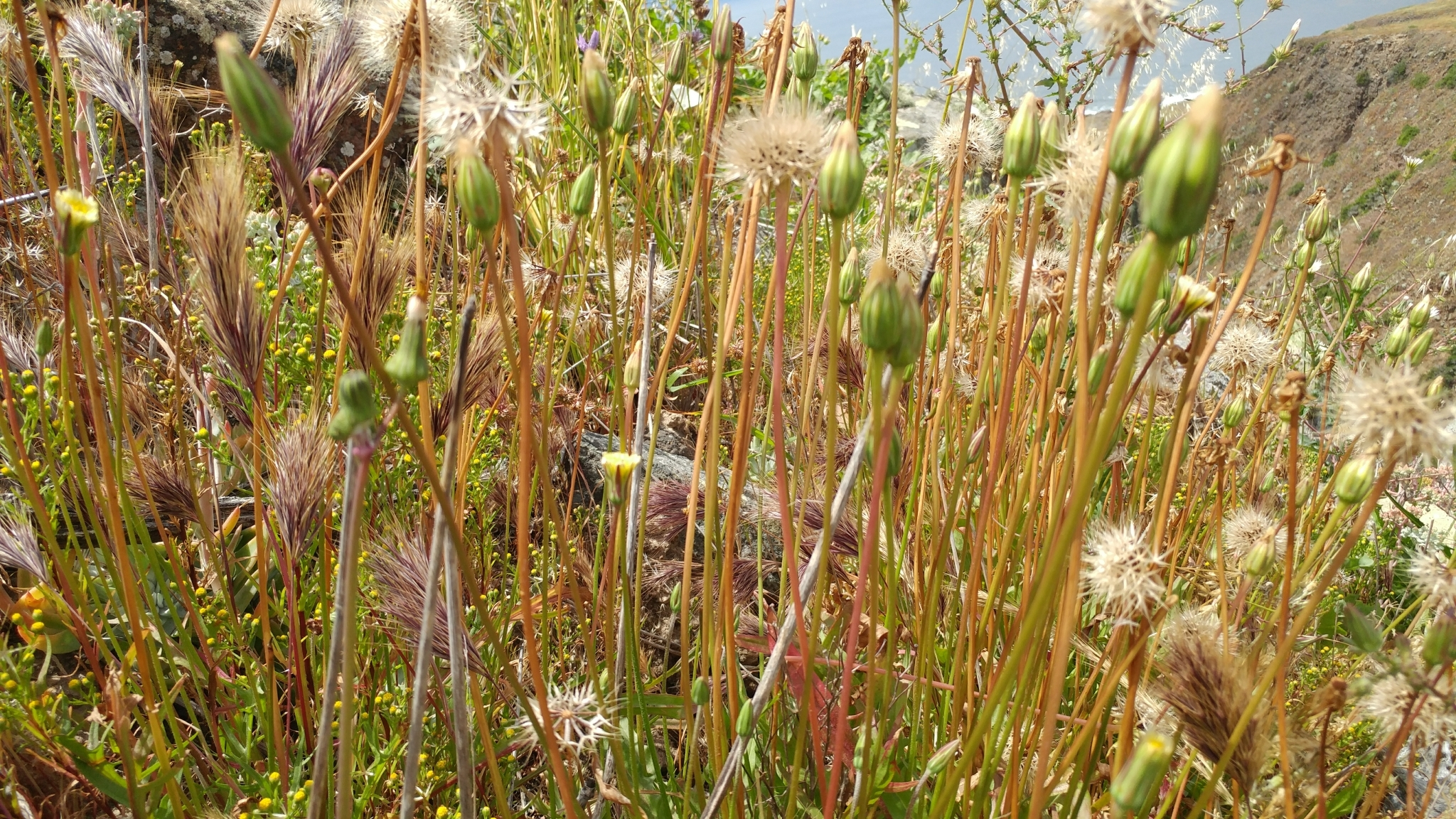

Scientific classification
- Kingdom: Plantae
- Clade: Tracheophytes
- Clade: Angiosperms
- Clade: Eudicots
- Clade: Asterids
- Order: Asterales
- Family: Asteraceae
- Genus: Microseris
- Species: M. heterocarpa

Binomial name
- Microseris heterocarpa (Nutt.) K.L.Chambers

Synonyms
- Calais kelloggii Greene; Microseris lindleyi var. clevelandii H.M.Hall; Stebbinsoseris heterocarpa (Nutt.) K.L.Chambers; Uropappus heterocarpus Nutt.; Uropappus kelloggii Greene; Uropappus macrochaetus var. kelloggii (Greene) Jeps.

= Microseris heterocarpa =

Species of plant

Microseris heterocarpa, known by the common name grassland silverpuffs, is a species of flowering plant in the family Asteraceae.

== Distribution ==
It is native to southwestern North America, where it can be found in various areas of California, and parts of Arizona and northern Mexico. It grows in open habitat in chaparral, woodlands, grasslands, desert, Sierra foothill, and inland canyons.

This species is also found on Guadalupe Island, a Mexican island in the Pacific Ocean.

== Description ==
Microseris heterocarpa is variable in morphology. In general, it is an annual herb with a basal rosette of large leaves. The inflorescence arises on a tall peduncle bearing a solitary flower head. The head is lined in hairless phyllaries and contains many ray florets, often over 100, in shades of yellow or white.

The fruit is an achene with a brown, gray, blue, or purple body tipped with a pappus of five long, spreading scales, the whole unit measuring 1 or 2 centimeters.

This species is suspected to be a hybrid between Microseris douglasii and Uropappus lindleyi which may have evolved independently, possibly three times. The plant comes in a wide variety of appearances with variations in florescence properties and size, as well as height, ranging on a scale between both of the suspected parent taxa.
