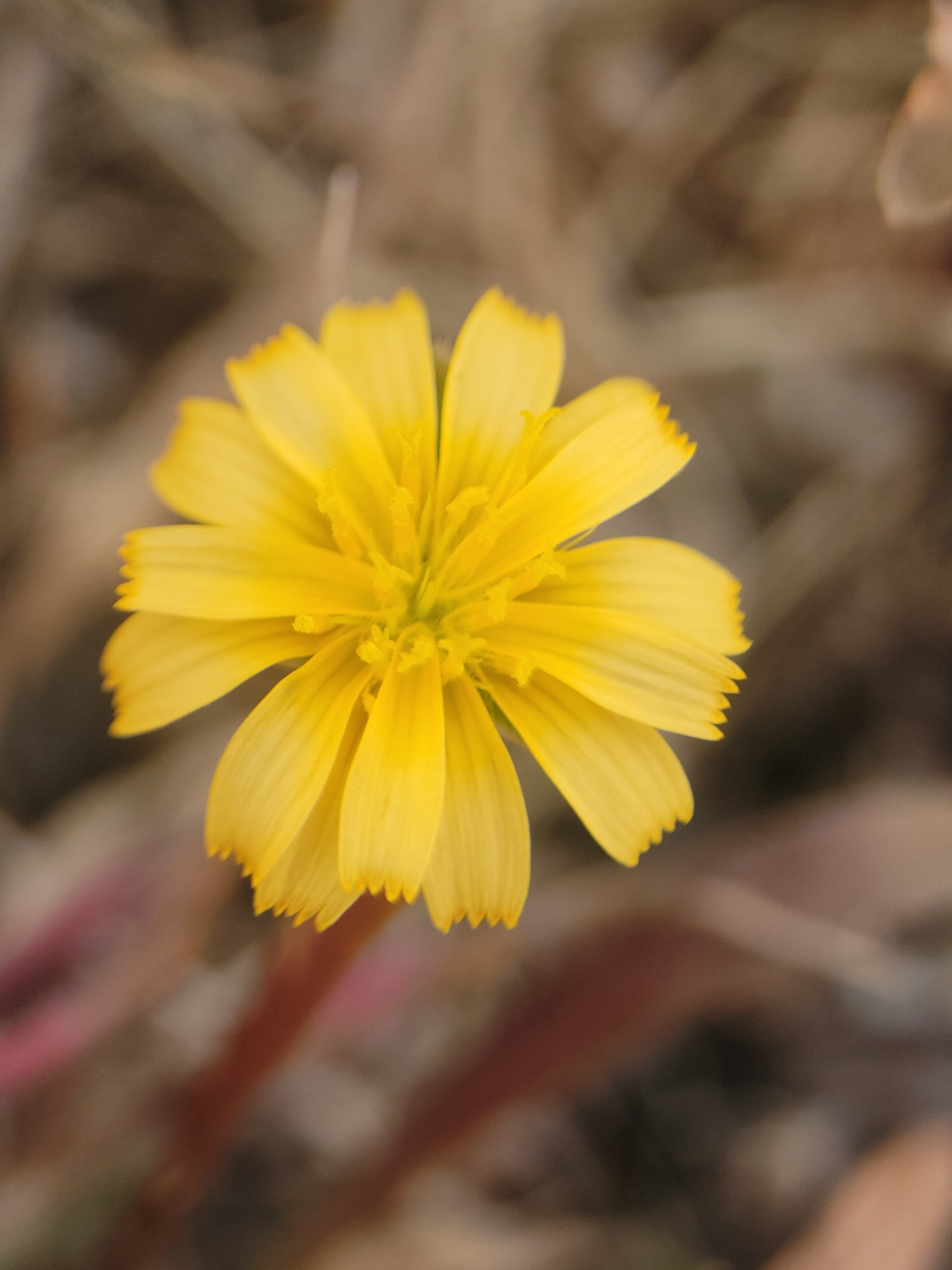

Scientific classification
- Kingdom: Plantae
- Clade: Tracheophytes
- Clade: Angiosperms
- Clade: Eudicots
- Clade: Asterids
- Order: Asterales
- Family: Asteraceae
- Genus: Microseris
- Species: M. bigelovii

Binomial name
- Microseris bigelovii (A.Gray) Sch. Bip.

= Microseris bigelovii =

Species of flowering plant

Microseris bigelovii is a species of flowering plant in the family Asteraceae known by the common name coastal silverpuffs. It is native to the west coast of North America, where its range extends from the southern tip of Vancouver Island to the northern coast of California.

== Description ==
It is an annual herb growing up to 60 centimeters tall from a basal rosette of erect leaves; there is no true stem. Each leaf is up to 25 centimeters long and has edges divided into many lobes. The inflorescence is borne on an erect or curving peduncle. The flower head contains up to 100 yellow or orange ray florets. The fruit is an achene with a brown, hairy to hairless body a few millimeters long. At the tip of the body is a large pappus made up of five long, bristly scales. Flowers bloom April to July.

== Distribution and habitat ==
Its distribution is scattered, and the northernmost populations are genetically distinct from the southernmost. In British Columbia there are five or six occurrences known to remain, in Washington the single known occurrence has probably been extirpated, and the Oregon populations are imperiled. The plant grows in rocky coastline habitats.
