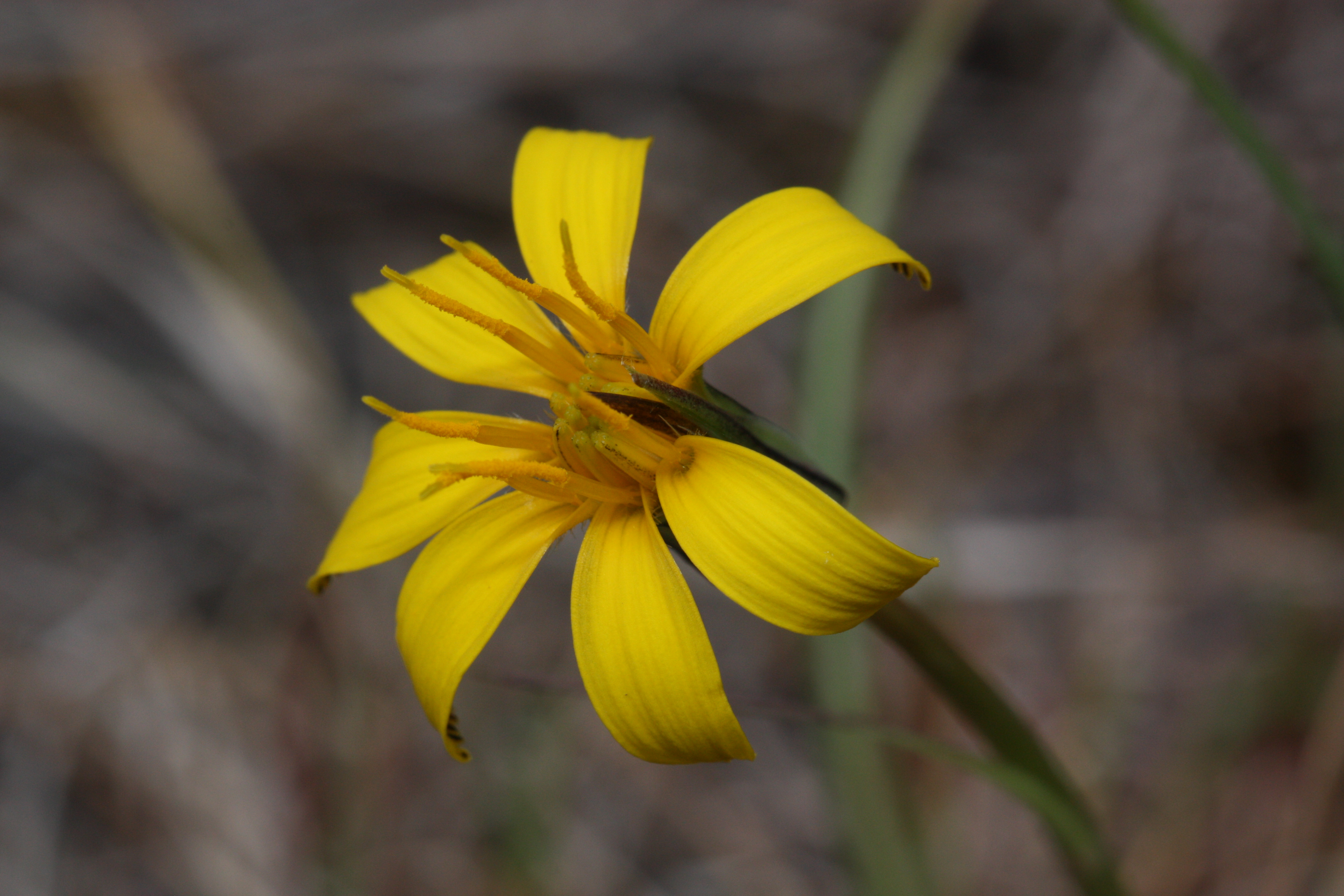

Scientific classification
- Kingdom: Plantae
- Clade: Tracheophytes
- Clade: Angiosperms
- Clade: Eudicots
- Clade: Asterids
- Order: Asterales
- Family: Asteraceae
- Genus: Nothocalais
- Species: N. troximoides

Binomial name
- Nothocalais troximoides (A.Gray) Greene

Synonyms
- Microseris troximoides Scorzonella troximoides

= Nothocalais troximoides =

Species of flowering plant

Nothocalais troximoides is a species of flowering plant in the family Asteraceae known by the common name sagebrush false dandelion. It is native to western North America, including British Columbia and the northwestern United States.

== Description ==
Nothocalais troximoides is a perennial herb growing from a stout root and a thick caudex and producing a woolly flower stem up to about 25 cm (10 inches) tall. The leaves are located around the base of the stem and often have crinkled wavy edges, and sometimes a thin coat of small hairs and a thicker fringe of hairs on the leaf edge. Each linear leaf has a prominent mid-rib that is usually paler in color and they are up to 30 cm (12 inches) long. Each flower stem bears a single flower and the flower head is lined with green, sometimes purple-speckled, phyllaries and containing many yellow ray florets and no disc florets. The fruit is a cylindrical achene up to 1.3 cm (1/2 inch) long not including the large pappus of up to 30 silvery white bristles which may be an additional 2 cm (3/4 inch) in length.

== Range and Habitat ==
Nothocalais troximoides is native to British Columbia and the northwestern United States in Washington, Oregon, northern California, Idaho, and Montana. It grows in sagebrush and other plateau and mountain habitat types, often in rocky soil.

== Gallery ==
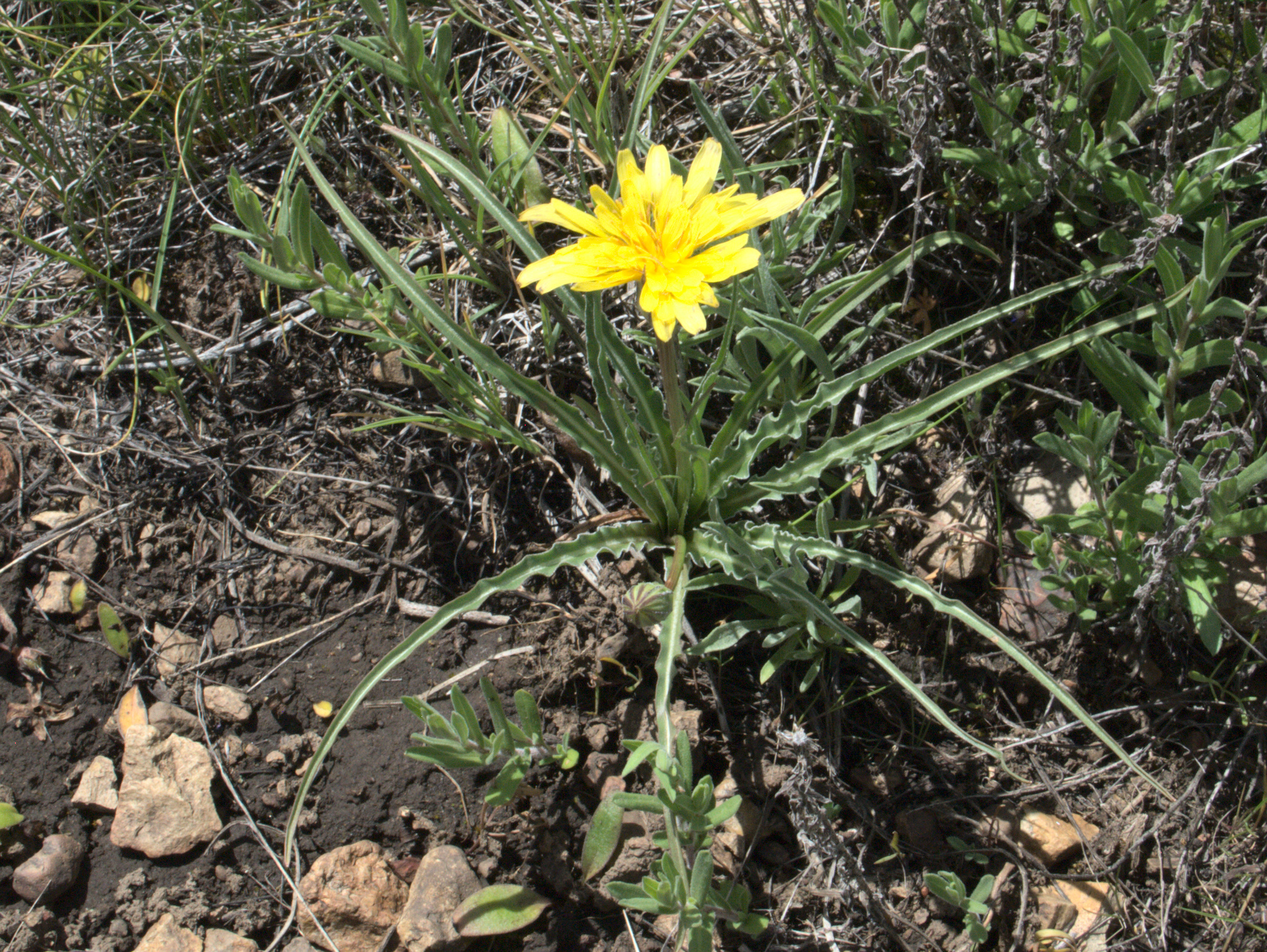
Showing flower and undulating leaf margins

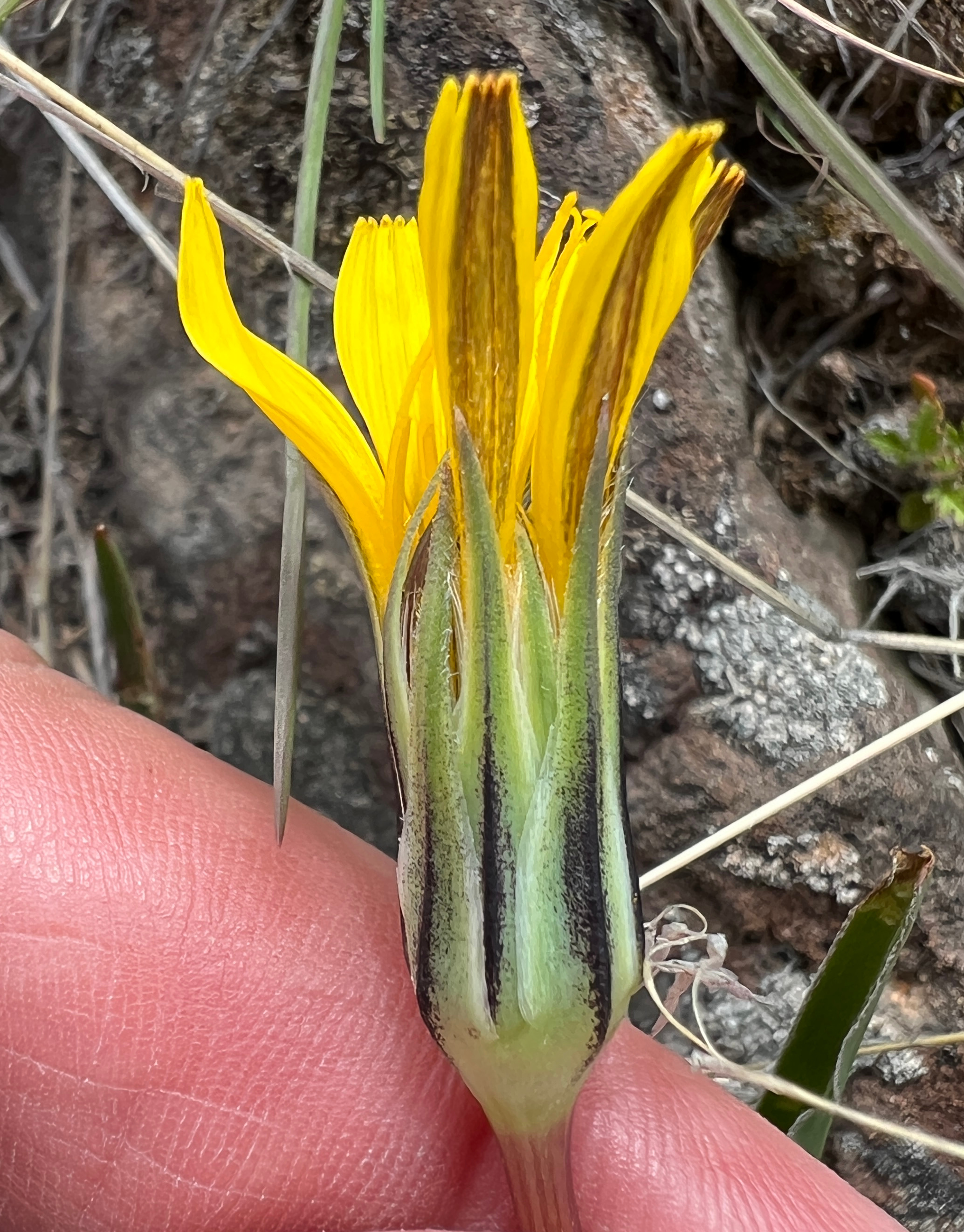
Phyllaries
