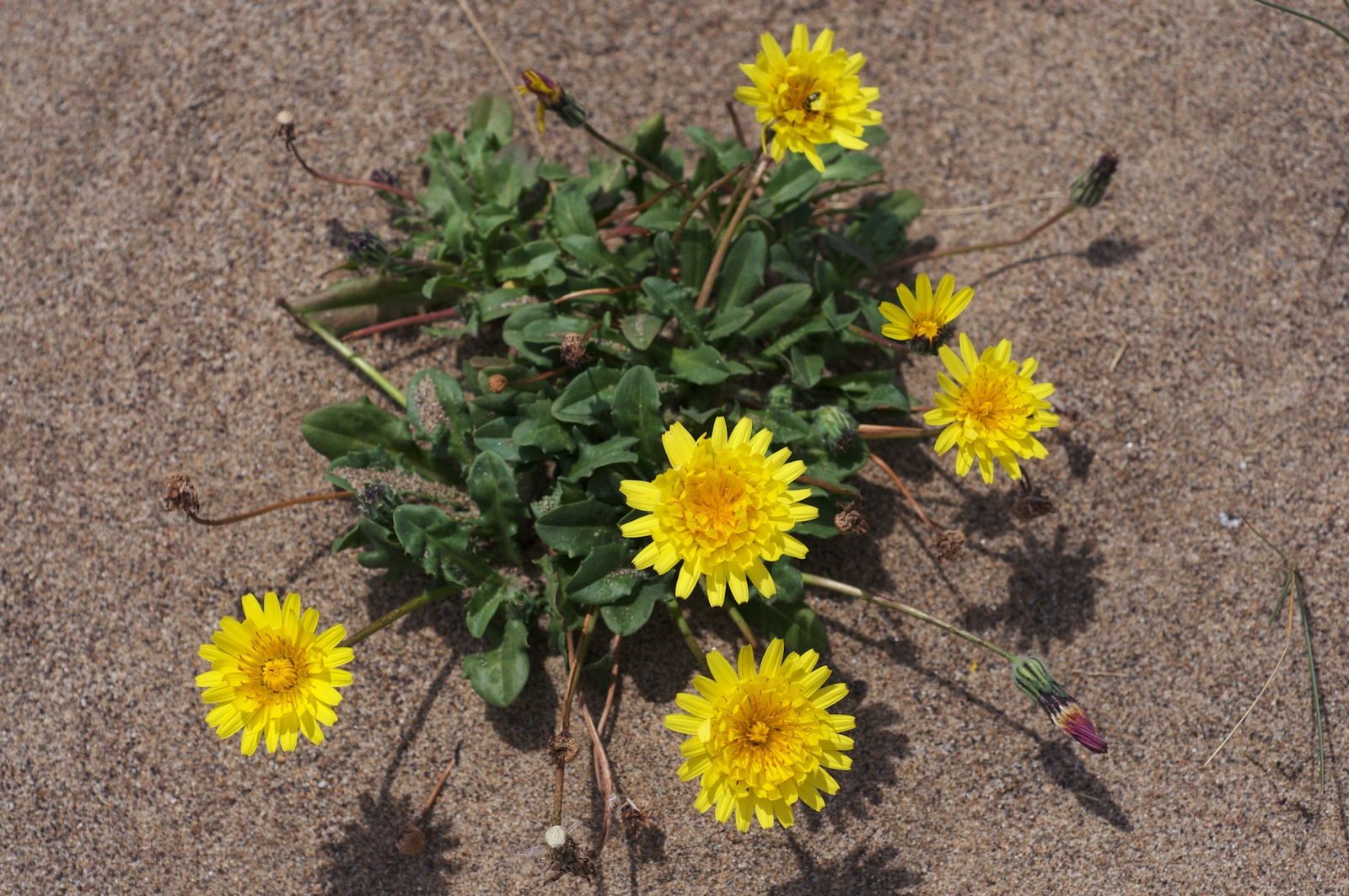

Scientific classification
- Kingdom: Plantae
- Clade: Tracheophytes
- Clade: Angiosperms
- Clade: Eudicots
- Clade: Asterids
- Order: Asterales
- Family: Asteraceae
- Genus: Agoseris
- Species: A. apargioides

Binomial name
- Agoseris apargioides (Less.) Greene

Synonyms
- Synonymy: Agoseris eastwoodiae Fedde; Agoseris humilis (Benth.) Kuntze; Agoseris maritima E.Sheld.; Agoseris maritima Eastw.; Barkhausia lessingii Hook. & Arn.; Leontodon hirsutus Hook.; Microrhynchus humilis Benth.; Stylopappus lessingii D.Dietr.; Taraxacum hirsutum (Hook.) Torr. & A.Gray; Troximon apargioides Less.; Troximon humile (Benth.) A.Gray

= Agoseris apargioides =

Species of flowering plant

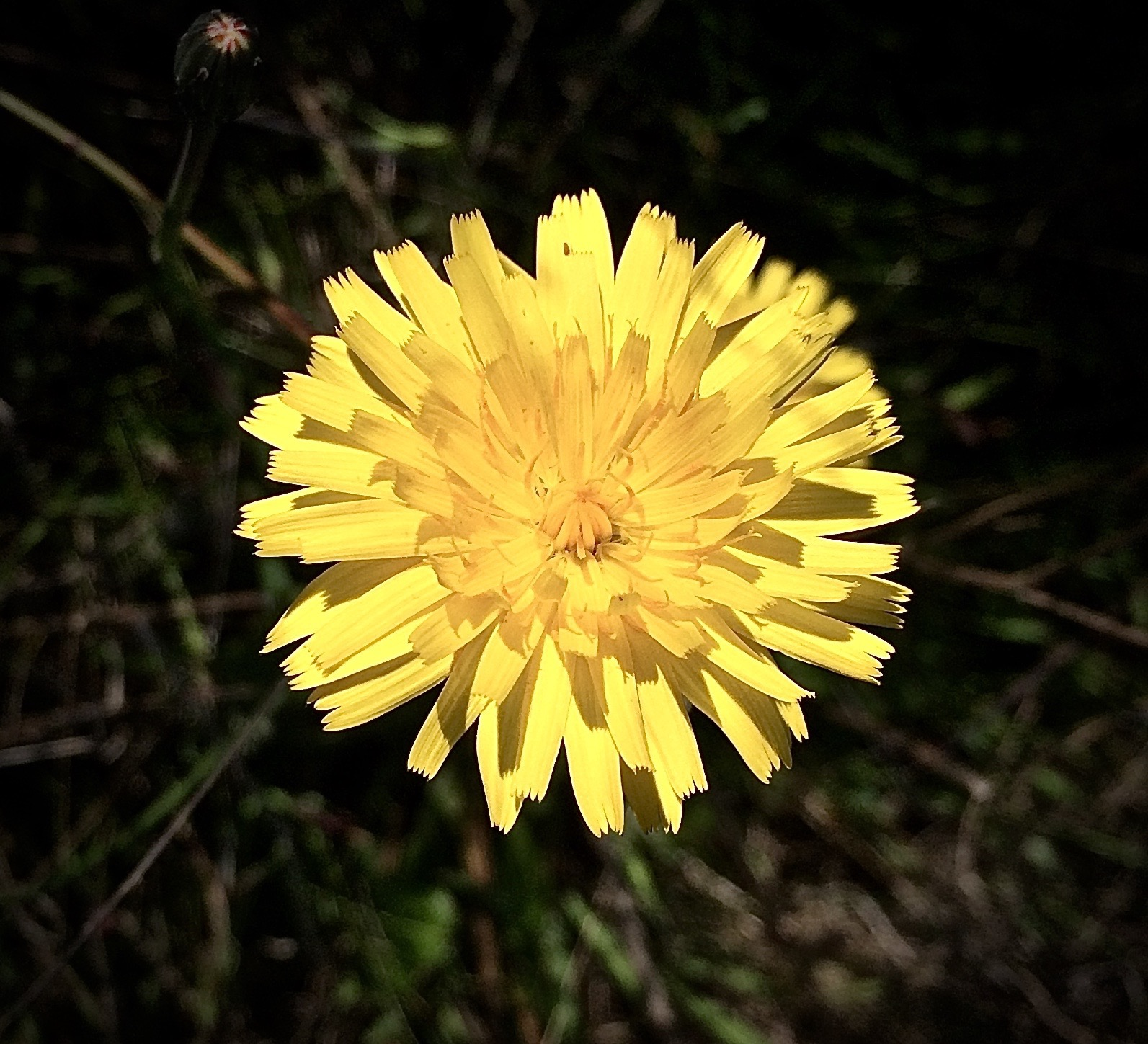
Agoseris apargioides, or seaside false-dandelion, Cambria, California

Agoseris apargioides is a species in the family Asteraceae, is commonly called seaside agoseris or seaside false-dandelion. It is native to the Pacific coast of the United States from Washington to central California, where it grows primarily on coastal dunes.

Agoseris apargioides is a low-growing, perennial herb with milky or orange sap, that may be stemless or with long, rhizome-like stems that are buried by drifting sand. The leaves form low rosettes on the ground. They are slender to broad, up to 15 centimeters long, and usually with 3-5 pairs of lobes along the margins (these sometimes lacking). The peduncle of the inflorescence can be as tall as 45 centimeters but is usually much shorter. The flower head is up to 2 centimeters wide, surrounded by glabrous to hairy phyllaries, and contains yellow ray florets (the outer ones often have a purple strip on the lower surface) but no disc florets. The fruit is an achene between 5-12 millimeters long; the lower part of the achene contains a single seed, while the upper portion of the achene forms a slender beak that possesses a terminal, white pappus.

== Varieties ==
Three varieties are recognized by Flora of North America and Calflora but not by The Plant List:

- Agoseris apargioides var. apargioides - west-central California
- Agoseris apargioides var. eastwoodiae - northwestern California
- Agoseris apargioides var. maritima - Washington, Oregon, extreme northwestern California
