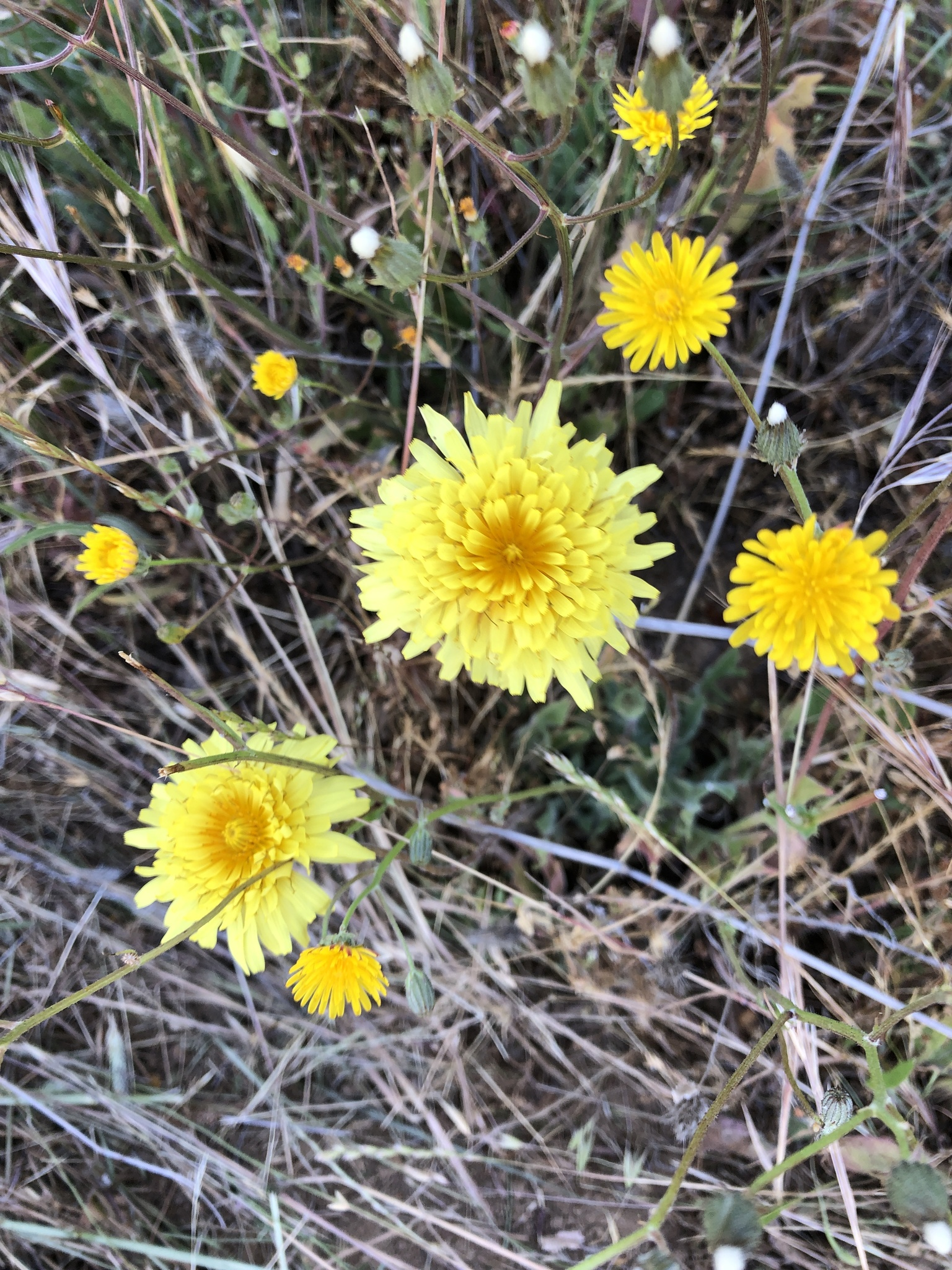

Scientific classification
- Kingdom: Plantae
- Clade: Tracheophytes
- Clade: Angiosperms
- Clade: Eudicots
- Clade: Asterids
- Order: Asterales
- Family: Asteraceae
- Genus: Agoseris
- Species: A. hirsuta

Binomial name
- Agoseris hirsuta (Hook.) Greene

Synonyms
- Leontodon hirsutus Hook.; Microrhynchus harfordii Kellogg; Taraxacum hirsutum (Hook.) DC.

= Agoseris hirsuta =

Species of flowering plant

Agoseris hirsuta is a North American species of flowering plants in the family Asteraceae known by the common name Coast Range agoseris or woolly goat chicory. It grows only in the Coast Ranges along the Pacific coast of California, from Humboldt County to San Luis Obispo County.

== Description ==
Agoseris hirsuta resembles the common dandelion (Taraxacum officinale) in having no leafy stems, only a rosette of leaves close to the ground. There is a single flower head with many yellow ray florets but no disc florets.
