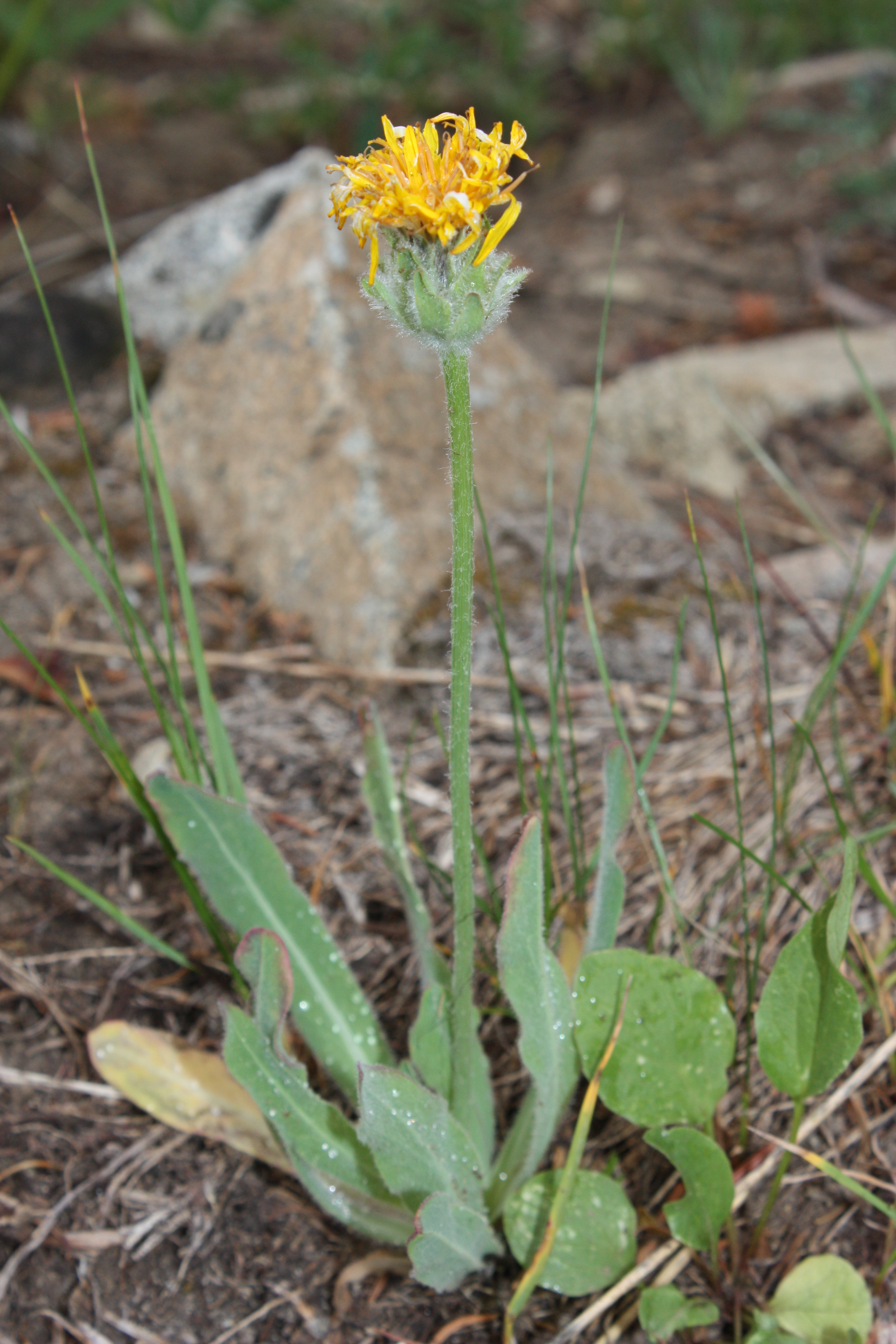
- Mount Rainier National Park

Conservation status
- Secure (NatureServe)

Scientific classification
- Kingdom: Plantae
- Clade: Tracheophytes
- Clade: Angiosperms
- Clade: Eudicots
- Clade: Asterids
- Order: Asterales
- Family: Asteraceae
- Genus: Agoseris
- Species: A. glauca

Binomial name
- Agoseris glauca (Pursh) Raf.

Synonyms
- Synonymy: Agoseris agrestis Osterh.; Agoseris altissima Rydb.; Agoseris apiculata Greene; Agoseris aspera (Rydb.) Rydb.; Agoseris dasycarpa Greene; Agoseris eisenhoweri B.Boivin; Agoseris isomeris Greene; Agoseris lacera Greene; Agoseris lanulosa Greene; Agoseris lapathifolia Greene; Agoseris longissima Greene; Agoseris longula Greene; Agoseris maculata Rydb.; Agoseris microdonta Greene; Agoseris procera Greene; Agoseris pubescens Rydb.; Agoseris pumila (Nutt.) Rydb.; Agoseris scorzonerifolia (Schrad.) Greene; Agoseris turbinata Rydb.; Agoseris vestita Greene; Agoseris vicinalis Greene; Agoseris villosa Rydb.; Ammogeton scorzonerifolius Schrad.; Microrhynchus glaucus (Pursh) D.C.Eaton; Tragopogon glaucus (Pursh) Steud.; Troximon glaucum Pursh; Troximon pubescens (Rydb.) A.Nelson; Troximon pumilum Nutt.; Troximon villosum (Rydb.) A.Nelson

= Agoseris glauca =

Species of flowering plant

Agoseris glauca is a species of flowering plant in the family Asteraceae known by the common names false dandelion, pale agoseris, prairie agoseris, and short-beaked agoseris. It is native to western North America.

== Description ==
Agoseris glauca is a perennial herb which varies in general appearance. Growing up to 70 centimeters (28 inches), it produces a basal patch of leaves of various shapes which may be as long as the plant is high, but are typically up to 35 cm (14 in).

There is no stem, but from May to September the plant flowers in a stemlike inflorescence which is sometimes erect, reaching heights near .5 metres (1 1/2 feet) or taller. The flower head is 1–3 cm (1/2–1 1/4 in) wide with layers of pointed phyllaries. The head is ligulate, bearing many yellow ray florets but no disc florets. The rays may become pinkish with age.

The fruit is an achene with a body up to a centimeter long and a pappus, which may be almost 2 cm in length.

=== Similar species ===
Other species in the genus known as false dandelion or mountain dandelion, as well as true dandelions, can be distinguished from A. glauca by differences in their fruit.

== Taxonomy ==
Varieties

- Agoseris glauca var. dasycephala (Torr. & A. Gray) Jeps.
- Agoseris glauca var. glauca

== Distribution and habitat ==
The plant is native to western and northwestern North America from Alaska east to the Northwest Territories and Ontario, southeast to California, Arizona, and New Mexico. It grows in many habitat types, usually those which are non-forested.

== Uses ==
The plant contains a bitter milky juice, which solidifies into a substance that can be chewed as gum; this may have been done by some Plains Indians.
