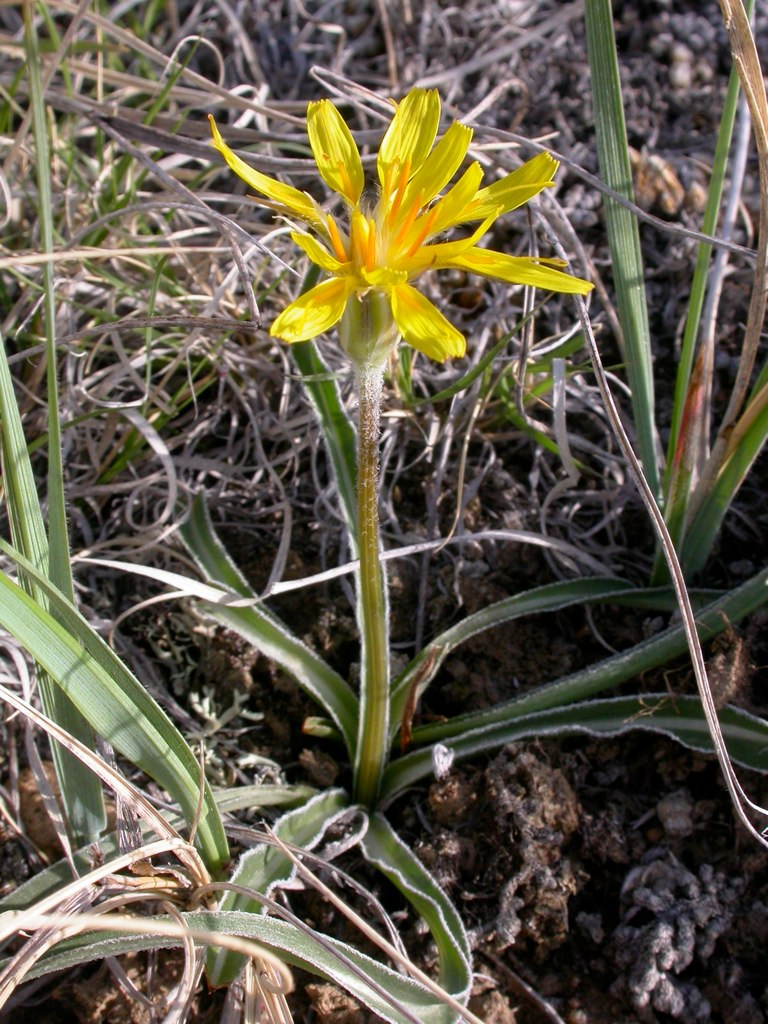

Scientific classification
- Kingdom: Plantae
- Clade: Embryophytes
- Clade: Tracheophytes
- Clade: Angiosperms
- Clade: Eudicots
- Clade: Asterids
- Order: Asterales
- Family: Asteraceae
- Genus: Nothocalais
- Species: N. cuspidata

Binomial name
- Nothocalais cuspidata (Pursh) Greene

Synonyms
- Agoseris cuspidata; Troximon cuspidatum Pursh

= Nothocalais cuspidata =

Species of flowering plant

Nothocalais cuspidata, the prairie false dandelion, is a herbaceous perennial with yellow flowers and long slender leaves. It is a member of the Asteraceae family and is native to the great plains. N.cuspidata faces habitat loss from the increasing fragmentation of the great plains.

Prairie false dandelion is also called: sharppoint prairie dandelion, microseris, wavy-leaf prairie-dandelion, sharppoint microseris, and microséris cuspidé.

== Habitat ==
N. cuspidata inhabits dry, well drained soils in open areas or grasslands along with gravely hillsides. They span from Canada to Texas and from New Mexico to Illinois, they exist in isolated populations in fragmented habitats. Habitats like these typically occur on bluffs or steeps slopes that border a river.

== Identification ==
N. cuspidata is characterized by their basal-only leaves. The leaves are long and narrow sometimes with erose to undulate margin, giving them a grass-like appearance. They have a single yellow flower that resembles a dandelion and can easily be mistaken for common dandelion.

== Phenology and reproduction ==
N. cuspidata is a perennial. Blooming from early-May through early-June, which is also the optimal identification period. The fruiting season is from late-May through late-June.

== Threats ==
N. cuspidata along with other species native to the Great Plains are at risk of habitat loss from woody encroachment and habitat fragmentation. Habitat fragmentation causes a decrease in genetic diversity from reducing the number of plants a specimen can pollinate and their ability to adapt to environmental pressures.
