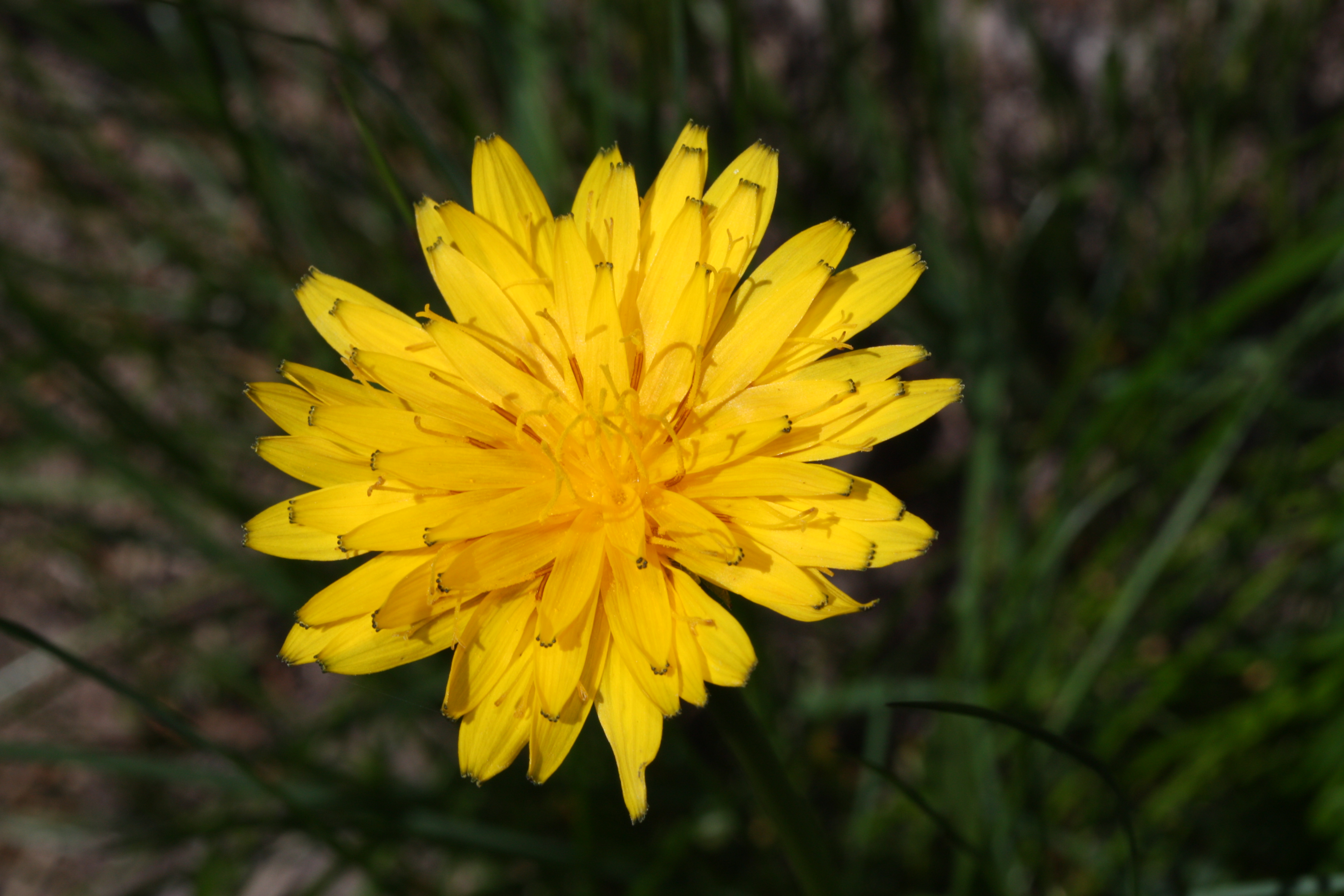

Scientific classification
- Kingdom: Plantae
- Clade: Tracheophytes
- Clade: Angiosperms
- Clade: Eudicots
- Clade: Asterids
- Order: Asterales
- Family: Asteraceae
- Genus: Nothocalais
- Species: N. alpestris

Binomial name
- Nothocalais alpestris (A.Gray) K.L. Chambers

Synonyms
- Agoseris alpestris (A.Gray) Greene; Agoseris barbellulata (Greene ex A.Gray) Greene; Microseris alpestris (A.Gray) Q.Jones ex Cronquist; Troximon alpestre A.Gray

= Nothocalais alpestris =

Species of flowering plant

Nothocalais alpestris is a species of flowering plant in the family Asteraceae known by the common name alpine lake false dandelion. It is native to the Cascade Range, Sierra Nevada and other mountains from northern Washington to central California, where it grows in subalpine forests and meadows, most commonly at 1,200–2,700 m (4,000–9,000 ft) elevation.

== Description ==
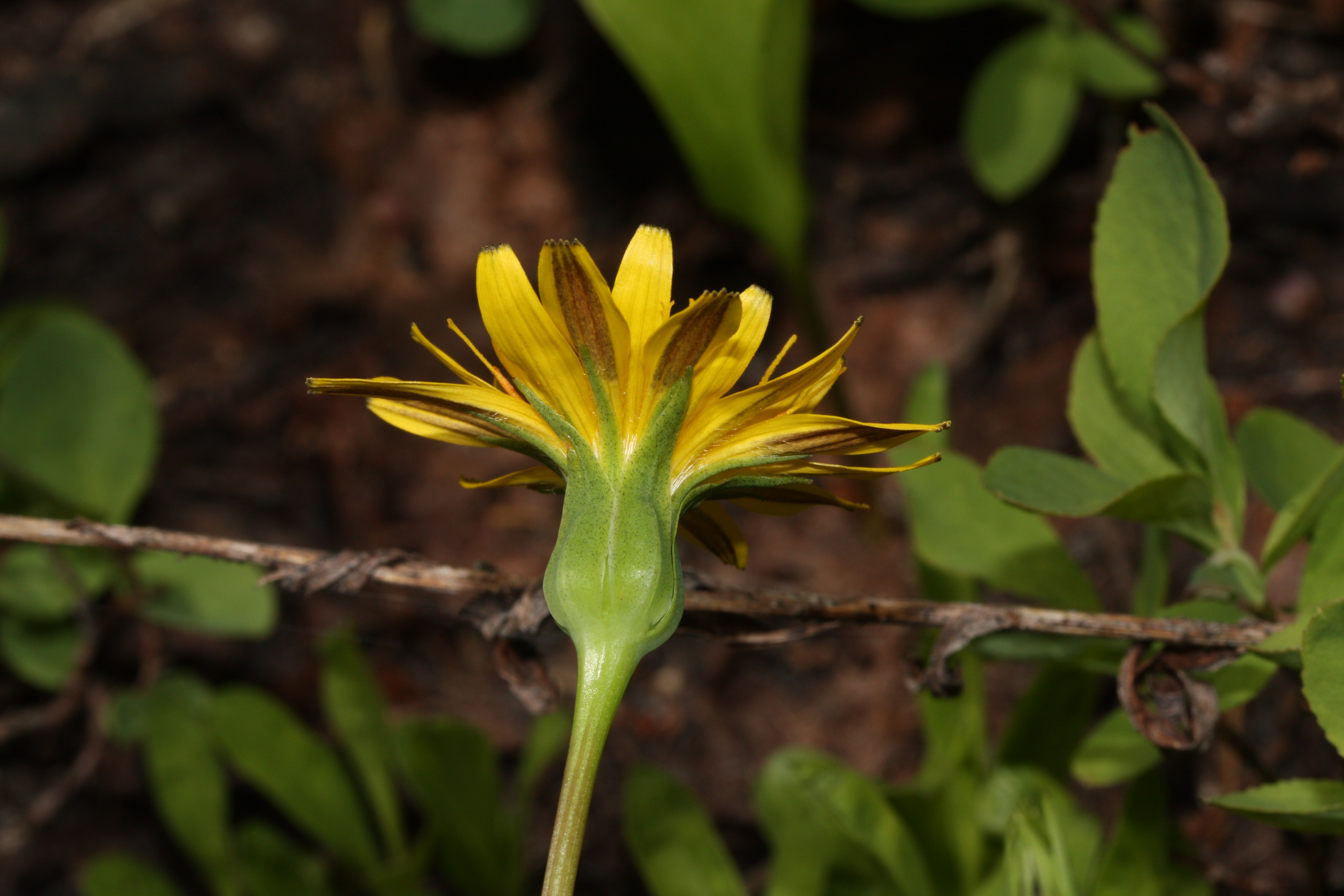
Hairless green phyllaries are nearly equal in length, the outer wider than the inner, and often purple-dotted.

Nothocalais alpestris is a nearly hairless perennial herb growing from a thick caudex and reaching about 25 cm (10 in) tall. The leaves are located around the base of the stem and have toothed, wavy, or smooth edges, and sometimes a thin coat of small hairs. They measure up to 20 cm (8 in) long. The flower head is borne singly, usually on a leafless stalk. Hairless shiny phyllaries are green, usually with tiny purple dots and nearly equal in length, with the outer ones wider than the inner. The corolla contains many yellow ray florets and no disc florets. The fruit from each floret is a cylindrical achene up to 1 cm (1/2 in) long, not considering the large pappus of up to 50 hairlike white bristles which may be an additional centimeter in length.
