= Kazbegia =

Scientific classification
- Kingdom: Plantae
- Clade: Tracheophytes
- Clade: Angiosperms
- Clade: Eudicots
- Clade: Asterids
- Order: Asterales
- Family: Asteraceae
- Tribe: Senecioneae
- Subtribe: Senecioninae
- Genus: Kazbegia; Uysal & Hamzaoğlu
- Species: K. parviflora

Binomial name
- Kazbegia parviflora (M.Bieb.) Uysal & Hamzaoğlu

Synonyms
- Caucasalia parviflora (M.Bieb.) B.Nord.; Cineraria parviflora M.Bieb.; Senecio alatus Willd. ex Ledeb.; Senecio lampsanoides DC.

Genus of flowering plants

Kazbegia is a genus of flowering plants in the family Asteraceae. It includes a single species, Kazbegia parviflora, a rhizomatous geophyte native to the Caucasus.

The species was first described as Cineraria parviflora by Friedrich August Marschall von Bieberstein in 1808. In 1997 Bertil Nordenstam moved the species to genus Caucasalia. In 2024 Bozkurt et al. published a phylogenetic and morphological analysis which found the species to be distinct from other species of Caucasalia, and the authors placed the species in the new monotypic genus Kazbegia, which they named for Kazbegi mountain in the Georgian Caucasus.
