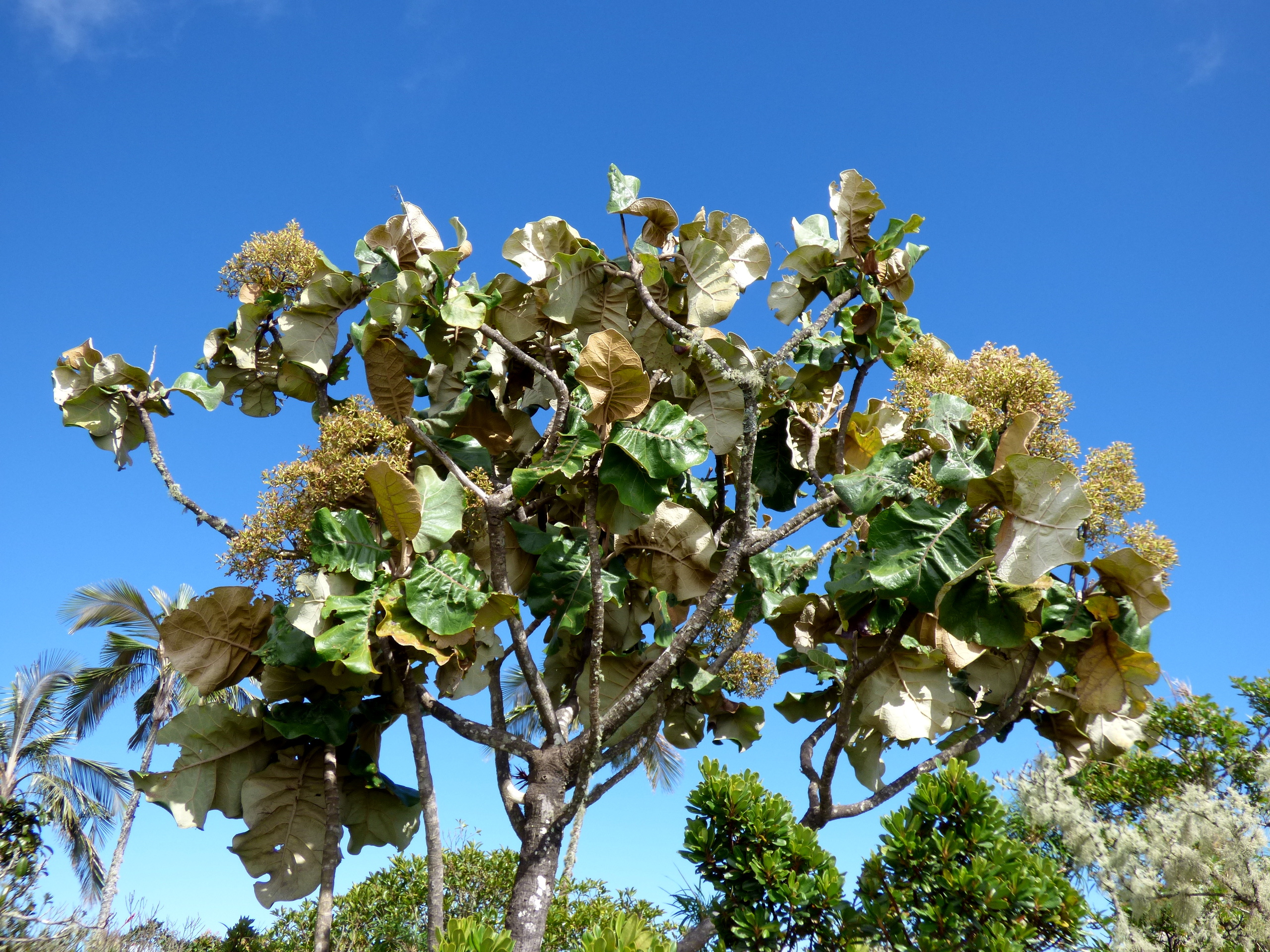
- Paragynoxys undatifolia

Scientific classification
- Kingdom: Plantae
- Clade: Tracheophytes
- Clade: Angiosperms
- Clade: Eudicots
- Clade: Asterids
- Order: Asterales
- Family: Asteraceae
- Subfamily: Asteroideae
- Tribe: Senecioneae
- Genus: Paragynoxys (Cuatrec.) Cuatrec.

Synonyms
- Senecio sect. Praegynoxys Cuatrec.; Aequatorium subg. Praegynoxys (Cuatrec.) B.Nord.

= Paragynoxys =

Genus of flowering plants

Paragynoxys is a genus of South American flowering plants in the groundsel tribe within the sunflower family.

Species

- Paragynoxys angosturae - Colombia
- Paragynoxys corei - Colombia
- Paragynoxys cuatrecasasii - Venezuela
- Paragynoxys magnifolia - Venezuela
- Paragynoxys martingrantii - Venezuela
- Paragynoxys meridana - Venezuela
- Paragynoxys neodendroides - Colombia
- Paragynoxys pileolanata - Colombia
- Paragynoxys regis - Ecuador
- Paragynoxys santurbanensis - Colombia
- Paragynoxys steyermarkii - Venezuela
- Paragynoxys undatifolia - Colombia
- Paragynoxys uribei - Colombia
- Paragynoxys venezuelae - Venezuela

formerly included

See Paracalia

- Paragynoxys lopezii - Paracalia lopezii
