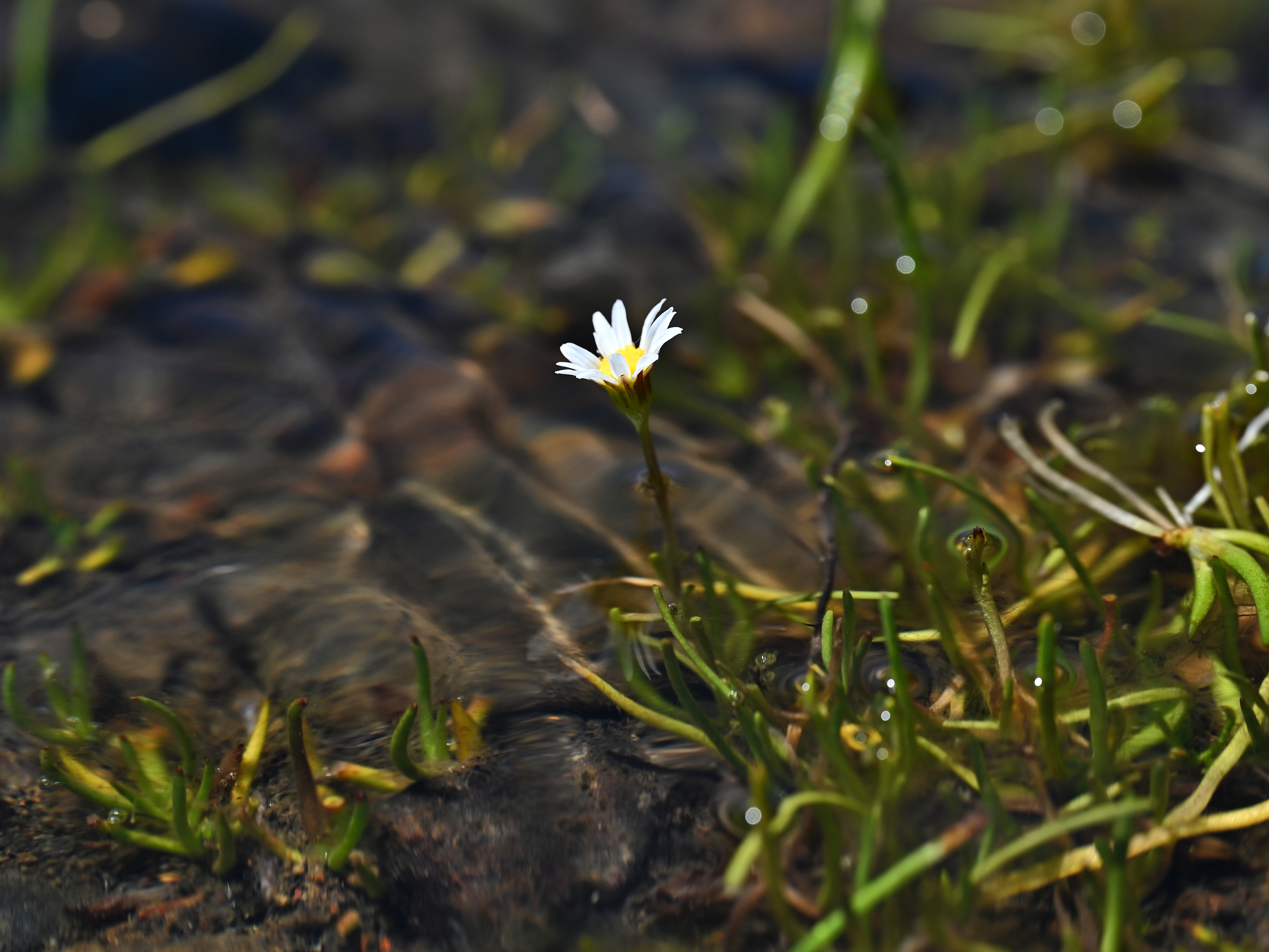
- Haplosticha zosterifolia in Araucania, Chile

Scientific classification
- Kingdom: Plantae
- Clade: Tracheophytes
- Clade: Angiosperms
- Clade: Eudicots
- Clade: Asterids
- Order: Asterales
- Family: Asteraceae
- Subfamily: Asteroideae
- Tribe: Senecioneae
- Subtribe: Senecioninae
- Genus: Haplosticha; Phil.

Species
- Haplosticha arnicoides (Hook. & Arn.) Pruski; Haplosticha trifurcata (G.Forst.) Pruski; Haplosticha zosterifolia (Hook. & Arn.) Pruski

= Haplosticha =

Genus of flowering plants

Haplosticha is a genus of flowering plants in the family Asteraceae. It includes three species of herbaceous perennials native to southern and central Chile and southern Argentina.

The genus was first named by Rodolfo Amando Philippi in 1859, and later synonymized with Senecio. John Francis Pruski revived the genus in 2021. Species have white ray corollas is similar to Iocenes, but are distinguished from Iocenes by their truncate exappendiculate styles.

== Species ==
Three species are accepted.

- Haplosticha arnicoides (Hook. & Arn.) Pruski – central and southern Chile
- Haplosticha trifurcata (G.Forst.) Pruski – south-central and southern Chile and southern Argentina
- Haplosticha zosterifolia (Hook. & Arn.) Pruski – central and southern Chile and southern Argentina (Neuquén and Rio Negro provinces)
