= Mesogramma =

Mesogramma may refer to:

- Mesogramma (plant), a genus of plants in the family Asteraceae
- Mesogramma, a genus of flies in the family Syrphidae, synonym of Mesograpta
- Mesogramma, a genus of butterflies in the family Geometridae, synonym of Mesotype
- Mesogramma, a fossil genus of insects in the family Hebeigrammidae, synonym of Hebeigramma
