= Oligothrix =

Scientific classification
- Kingdom: Plantae
- Clade: Tracheophytes
- Clade: Angiosperms
- Clade: Eudicots
- Clade: Asterids
- Order: Asterales
- Family: Asteraceae
- Subfamily: Asteroideae
- Tribe: Senecioneae
- Genus: Oligothrix; DC.
- Species: O. gracilis

Binomial name
- Oligothrix gracilis DC.

Genus of flowering plants

Oligothrix is a genus of flowering plants in the groundsel tribe within the sunflower family.

Species

The only known species is Oligothrix gracilis, which is endemic to the Cape Provinces of South Africa.

formerly included

see Psednotrichia

- Oligothrix newtonii O.Hoffm. - Psednotrichia newtonii (O.Hoffm.) Anderb. & P.O.Karis
- Oligothrix xyridopsis O.Hoffm. - Psednotrichia xyridopsis (O.Hoffm.) Anderb. & P.O.Karis
