= Ischnea =

Scientific classification
- Kingdom: Plantae
- Clade: Embryophytes
- Clade: Tracheophytes
- Clade: Angiosperms
- Clade: Eudicots
- Clade: Asterids
- Order: Asterales
- Family: Asteraceae
- Subfamily: Asteroideae
- Tribe: Senecioneae
- Genus: Ischnea; F.Muell.

Type species
- Ischnea elachoglossa F.Muell.

Genus of flowering plants

Ischnea is a genus of New Guinean flowering plants in the daisy family.

Species

- Ischnea brassii H.Rob. & Brettell - Papua New Guinea
- Ischnea capellana Swenson - Papua New Guinea
- Ischnea elachoglossa F.Muell. - Indonesian New Guinea
- Ischnea keysseri Mattf. - New Guinea
- Ischnea korythoglossa Mattf. - New Guinea

formerly included

see Lagenocypsela

- Ischnea latifolia Mattf. - Lagenocypsela latifolia (Mattf.) Swenson & K.Bremer
