= Brachionostylum =

Scientific classification
- Kingdom: Plantae
- Clade: Tracheophytes
- Clade: Angiosperms
- Clade: Eudicots
- Clade: Asterids
- Order: Asterales
- Family: Asteraceae
- Subfamily: Asteroideae
- Tribe: Senecioneae
- Genus: Brachionostylum; Mattf.
- Species: B. pullei

Binomial name
- Brachionostylum pullei Mattf.

Genus of flowering plants

Brachionostylum is a monotypic genus of flowering plants in the aster family, Asteraceae, containing the single species Brachionostylum pullei. It is endemic to New Guinea.
