= Herreranthus =

Scientific classification
- Kingdom: Plantae
- Clade: Tracheophytes
- Clade: Angiosperms
- Clade: Eudicots
- Clade: Asterids
- Order: Asterales
- Family: Asteraceae
- Subfamily: Asteroideae
- Tribe: Senecioneae
- Genus: Herreranthus; B.Nord.
- Species: H. rivalis

Binomial name
- Herreranthus rivalis (Greenm.) B.Nord.

Genus of plants

Herreranthus is a genus of flowering plants belonging to the family Asteraceae. It contains a single species, Herreranthus rivalis.

Its native range is Cuba.

The genus is named after Pedro Pablo Herrera Oliver (20th and 21st centuries), Cuban biologist who worked at the ministry of science in Havana; specialist in native Asteraceae.
