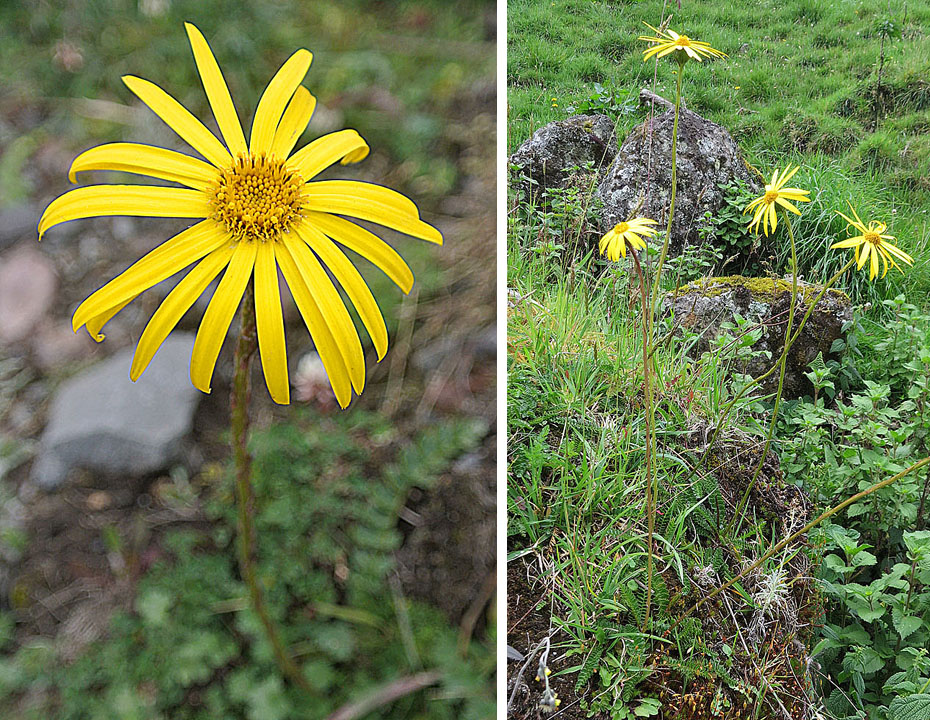
- Dorobaea pimpinellifolia

Scientific classification
- Kingdom: Plantae
- Clade: Tracheophytes
- Clade: Angiosperms
- Clade: Eudicots
- Clade: Asterids
- Order: Asterales
- Family: Asteraceae
- Subfamily: Asteroideae
- Tribe: Senecioneae
- Genus: Dorobaea; Cass.

= Dorobaea =

Genus of flowering plants

Dorobaea is a genus of flowering plants in the daisy family, Asteraceae.
