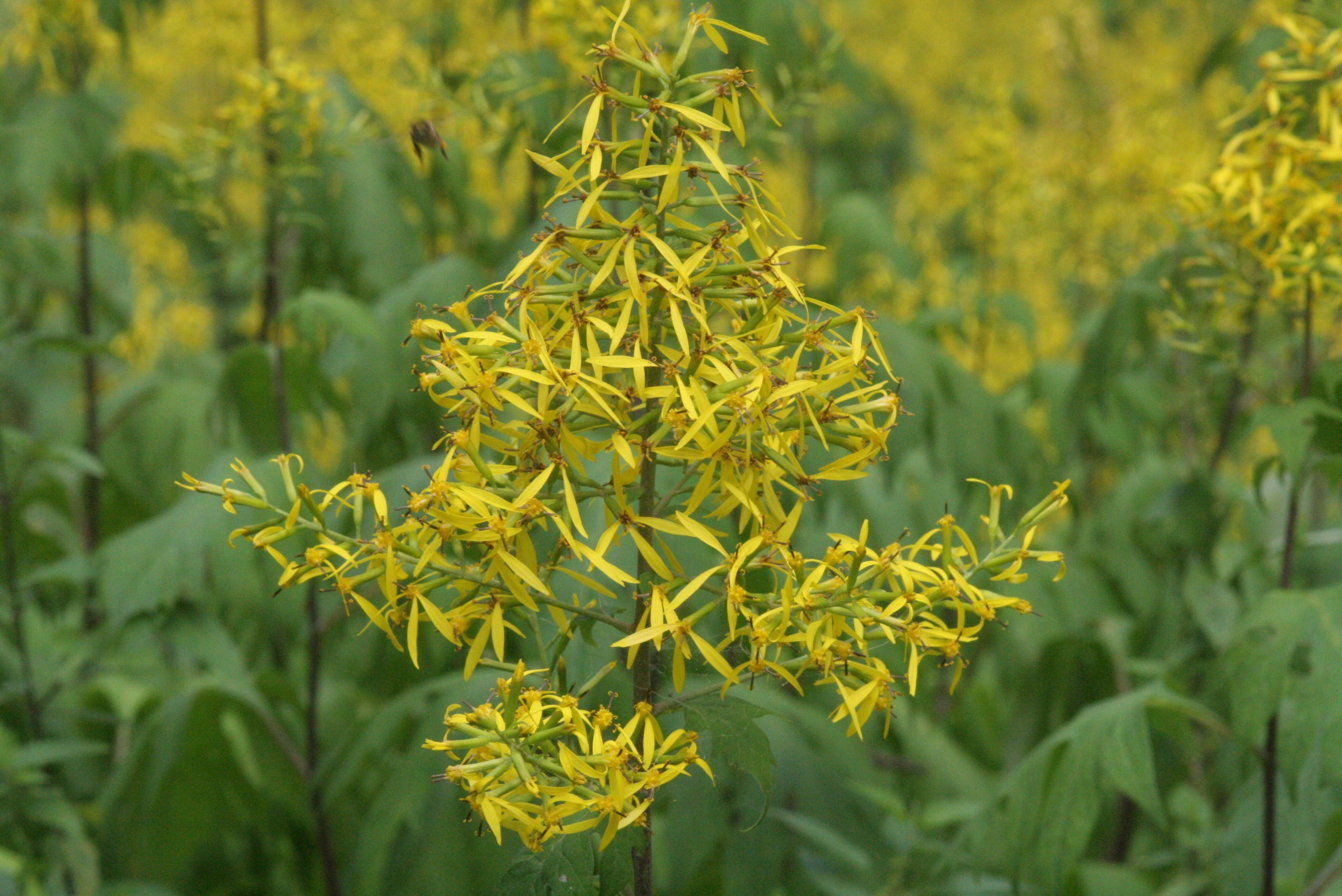
- Sinacalia tangutica

Scientific classification
- Kingdom: Plantae
- Clade: Tracheophytes
- Clade: Angiosperms
- Clade: Eudicots
- Clade: Asterids
- Order: Asterales
- Family: Asteraceae
- Subfamily: Asteroideae
- Tribe: Senecioneae
- Genus: Sinacalia; H.Rob. & Brettell

Type species
- Senecio henryi Hemsl.

Synonyms
- Sincalia H.Rob. & Brettell, alternate spelling

= Sinacalia =

Genus of plants

Sinacalia is a genus of Chinese plants in the groundsel tribe within the daisy family.

Species

- Sinacalia caroli (C.Winkl.) C.Jeffrey & Y.L.Chen - Gansu, Sichuan
- Sinacalia davidii (Franch.) H.Koyama - Shaanxi, Sichuan, Tibet, Yunnan
- Sinacalia macrocephala (H.Rob. & Brettell) C.Jeffrey & Y.L.Chen - Hubei
- Sinacalia tangutica (Maxim.) B.Nord - Gansu, Hebei, Henan, Hubei, Hunan, Ningxia, Qinghai, Shaanxi, Shanxi, Sichuan
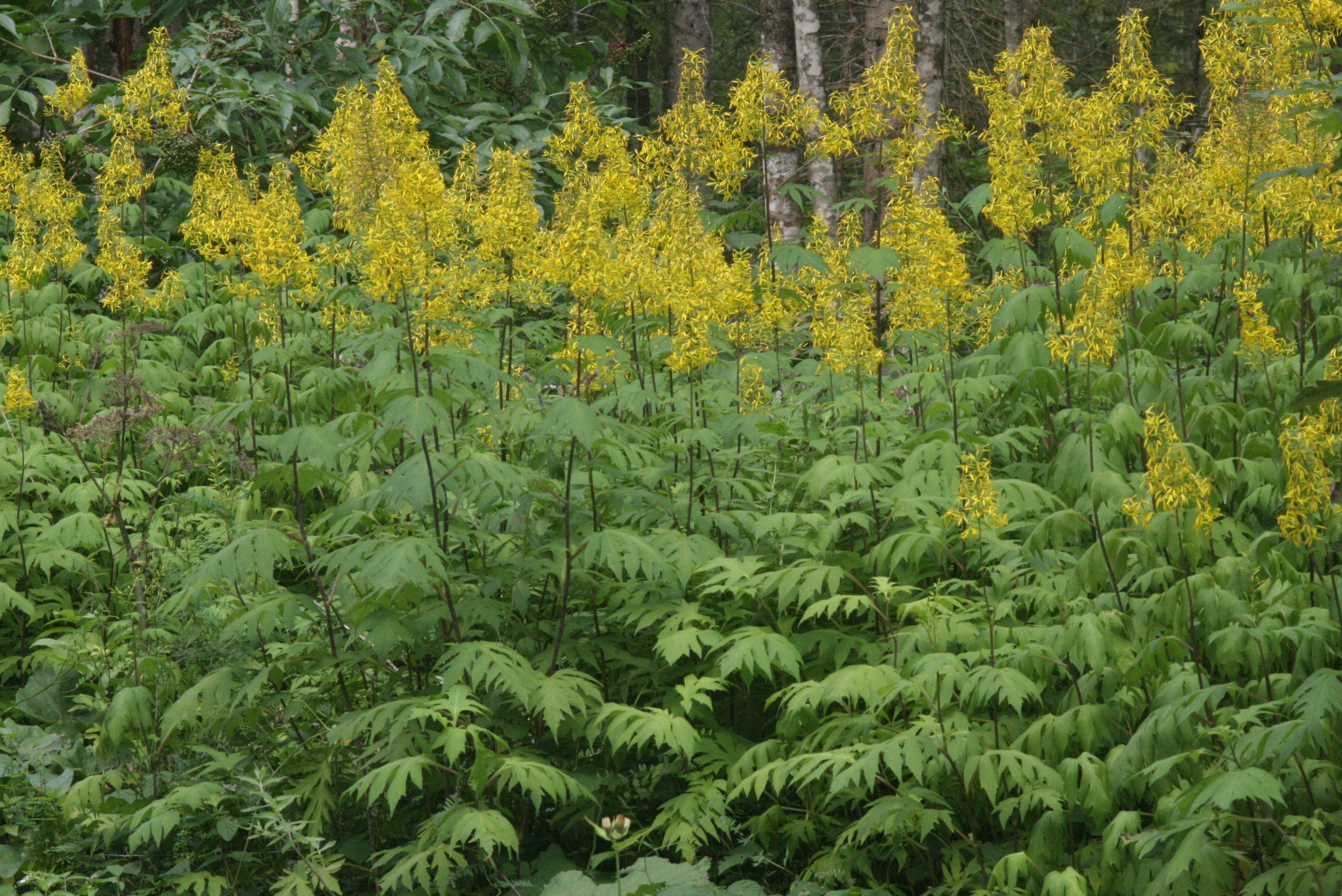
Sinacalia tangutica

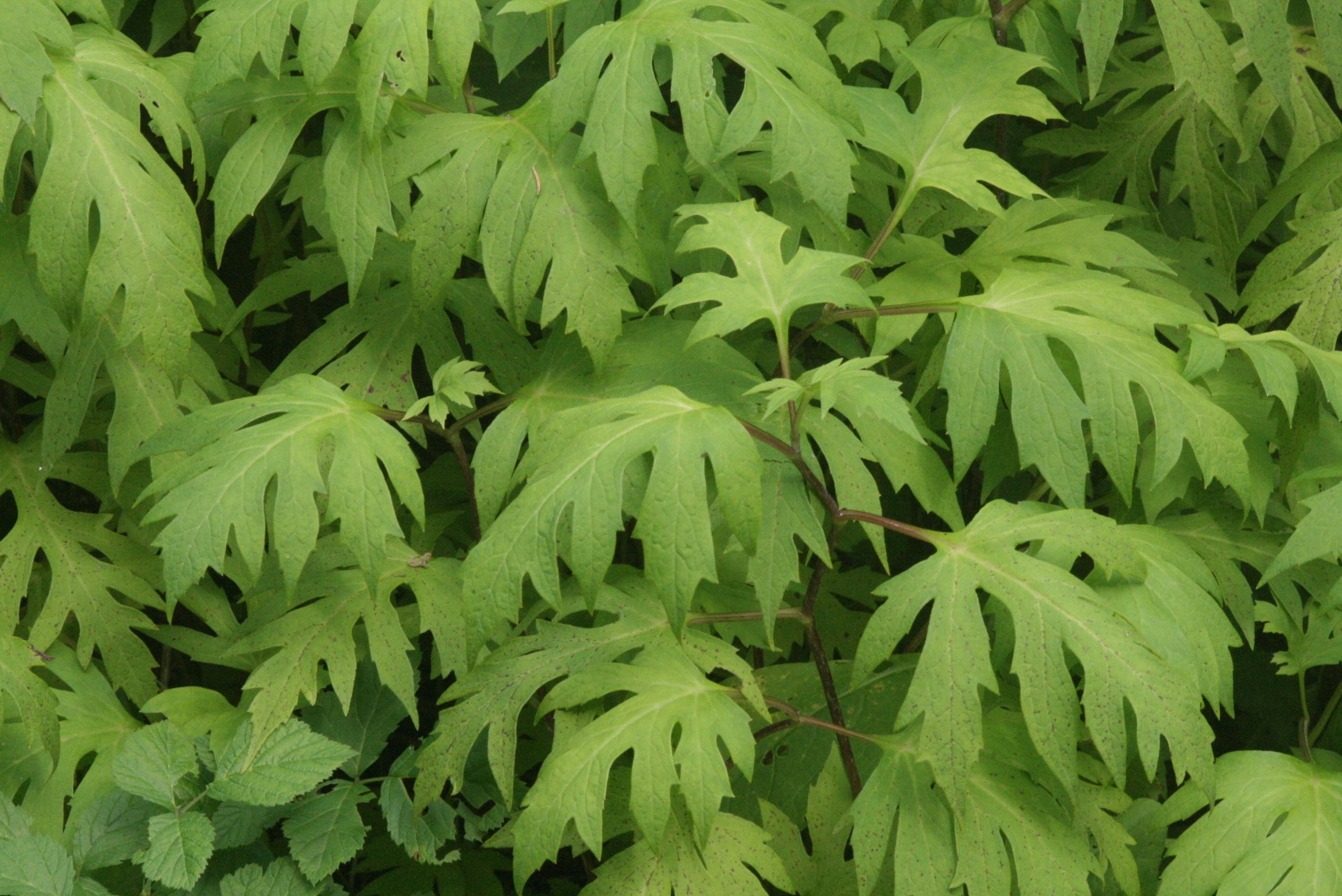
Sinacalia tangutica

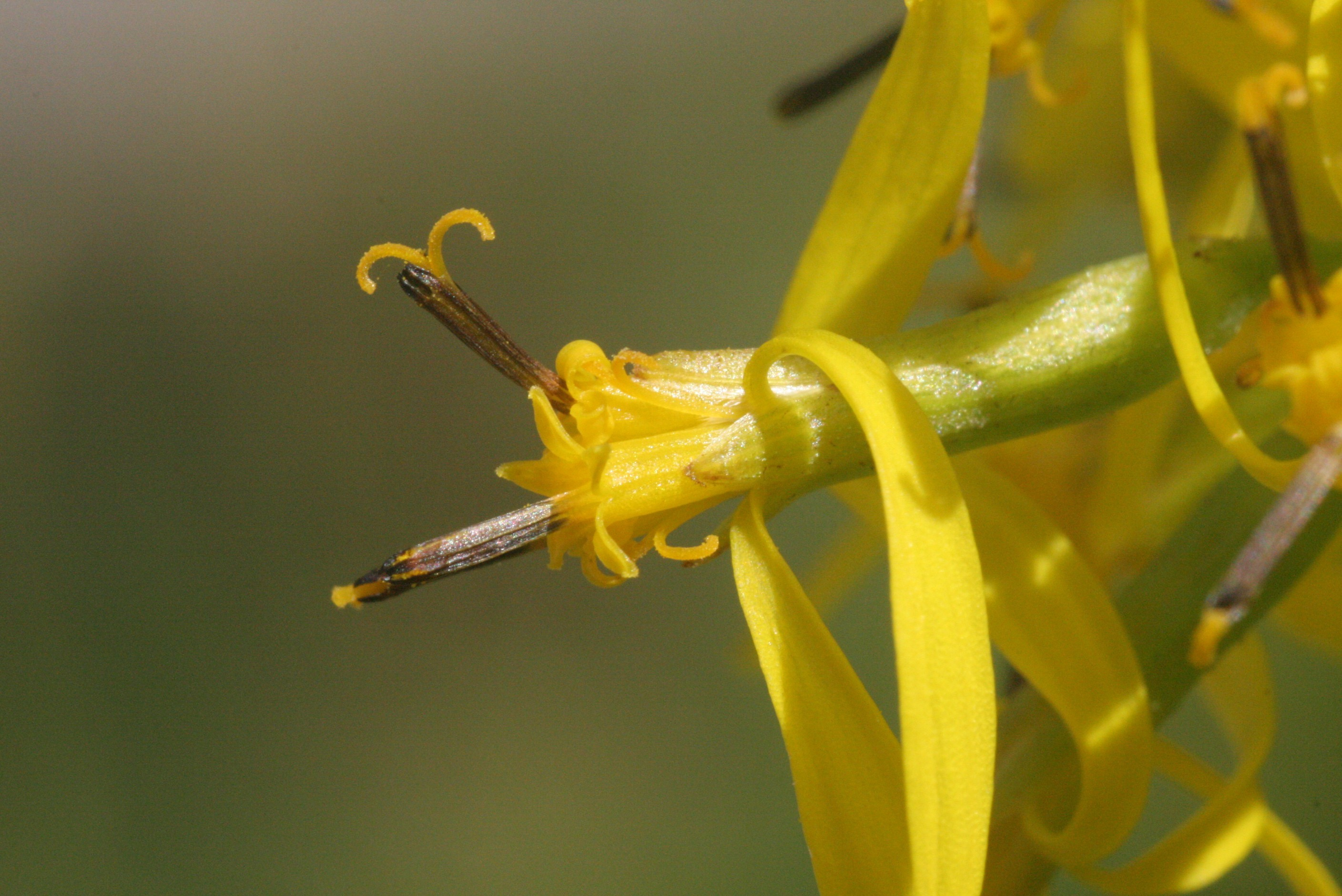
Sinacalia tangutica
