= Dresslerothamnus =

Scientific classification
- Kingdom: Plantae
- Clade: Embryophytes
- Clade: Tracheophytes
- Clade: Angiosperms
- Clade: Eudicots
- Clade: Asterids
- Order: Asterales
- Family: Asteraceae
- Subfamily: Asteroideae
- Tribe: Senecioneae
- Genus: Dresslerothamnus; H.Rob.

Type species
- Dresslerothamnus angustiradiatus (T.M.Barkley) H.Rob.

Genus of flowering plants

Dresslerothamnus is a genus of flowering plants in the daisy family.

Species

- Dresslerothamnus angustiradiatus (T.M.Barkley) H.Rob. – Panama
- Dresslerothamnus gentryi H.Rob. – Colombia
- Dresslerothamnus peperomioides H.Rob. – Panama
- Dresslerothamnus schizotrichus (Greenm.) C.Jeffrey – Costa Rica
