= Charadranaetes =

Scientific classification
- Kingdom: Plantae
- Clade: Tracheophytes
- Clade: Angiosperms
- Clade: Eudicots
- Clade: Asterids
- Order: Asterales
- Family: Asteraceae
- Subfamily: Asteroideae
- Tribe: Senecioneae
- Genus: Charadranaetes; Janovec & H.Rob.
- Species: C. durandii

Binomial name
- Charadranaetes durandii (Klatt) Janovec & H.Rob.

Synonyms
- Pseudogynoxys durandii (Klatt) B.L.Turner; Senecio durandii Klatt

Genus of flowering plants

Charadranaetes is a genus of flowering plants belonging to the family Asteraceae. It contains a single species, Charadranaetes durandii, a subshrub endemic to Costa Rica.
