= Papuacalia =

Scientific classification
- Kingdom: Plantae
- Clade: Tracheophytes
- Clade: Angiosperms
- Clade: Eudicots
- Clade: Asterids
- Order: Asterales
- Family: Asteraceae
- Subfamily: Asteroideae
- Tribe: Senecioneae
- Genus: Papuacalia; Veldkamp

Type species
- Papuacalia dindondl (P.Royen) Veldkamp

Genus of flowering plants

Papuacalia is a genus of New Guinean flowering plants in the groundsel tribe within the sunflower family.

Species

- Papuacalia aurea - Papua New Guinea
- Papuacalia carstenszensis - New Guinea
- Papuacalia dindondl - New Guinea
- Papuacalia gandin - New Guinea
- Papuacalia glossophylla - New Guinea
- Papuacalia kandambren - New Guinea
- Papuacalia kukul - New Guinea
- Papuacalia milleri - western New Guinea
- Papuacalia mogrere - New Guinea
- Papuacalia ottoensis - New Guinea
- Papuacalia sandsii - western New Guinea
- Papuacalia saruwagedensis - New Guinea
- Papuacalia titoi - western New Guinea
- Papuacalia valentini - western New Guinea
- Papuacalia veldkampii - western New Guinea
- Papuacalia versteegii - New Guinea
- Papuacalia yuleensis - Papua New Guinea
