= Gynoxys regis =

Conservation status
- Vulnerable (IUCN 3.1)

Scientific classification
- Kingdom: Plantae
- Clade: Tracheophytes
- Clade: Angiosperms
- Clade: Eudicots
- Clade: Asterids
- Order: Asterales
- Family: Asteraceae
- Subfamily: Asteroideae
- Tribe: Senecioneae
- Genus: Gynoxys
- Species: G. regis

Binomial name
- Gynoxys regis H.Rob. & Cuatrec.

Synonyms
- Paragynoxys regis (H.Rob. & Cuatrec.) H.Rob. & Cuatrec.

Species of flowering plant

Gynoxys regis is a species of flowering plant in the family Asteraceae. It is found only in Ecuador. Its natural habitat is high Andean forest (2,500–3,500 m). It is threatened by habitat loss.
