= Mattfeldia =

Scientific classification
- Kingdom: Plantae
- Clade: Tracheophytes
- Clade: Angiosperms
- Clade: Eudicots
- Clade: Asterids
- Order: Asterales
- Family: Asteraceae
- Subfamily: Asteroideae
- Tribe: Senecioneae
- Genus: Mattfeldia; Urb.
- Species: M. triplinervis

Binomial name
- Mattfeldia triplinervis Urb.

Genus of flowering plants

Mattfeldia is a genus of flowering plants in groundsel tribe within the daisy family.

Species

There is only one known species, Mattfeldia triplinervis, known only from Haiti.
