= Parafaujasia =

Scientific classification
- Kingdom: Plantae
- Clade: Tracheophytes
- Clade: Angiosperms
- Clade: Eudicots
- Clade: Asterids
- Order: Asterales
- Family: Asteraceae
- Subfamily: Asteroideae
- Tribe: Senecioneae
- Genus: Parafaujasia; C.Jeffrey

Type species
- Parafaujasia mauritiana C.Jeffrey

Genus of flowering plants

Parafaujasia is a genus of flowering plants in the daisy family, native to certain islands in the Indian Ocean.

Species

- Parafaujasia fontinalis (Cordem.) C.Jeffrey - Réunion
- Parafaujasia mauritiana C.Jeffrey - Mauritius
