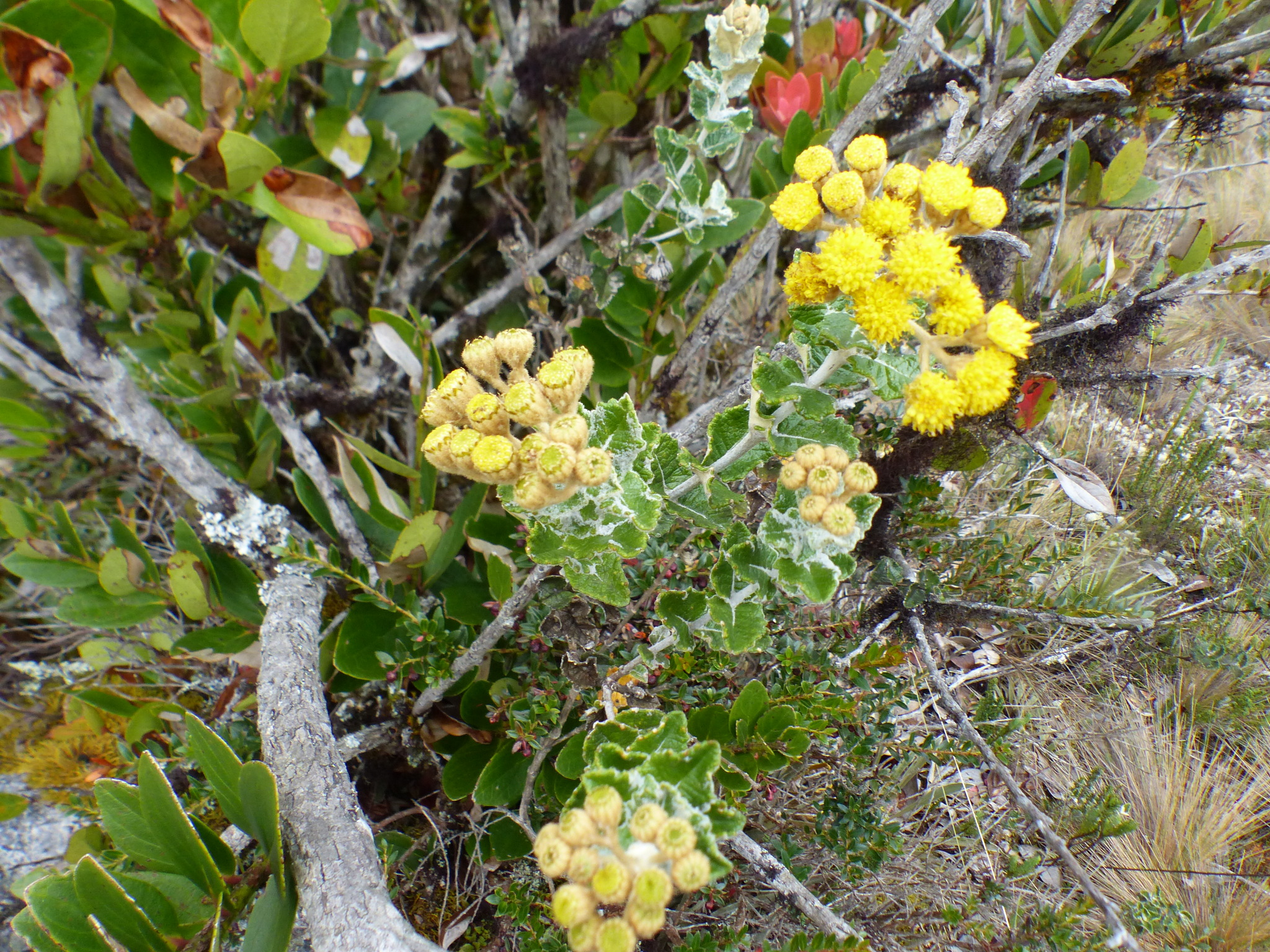
- Scrobicaria ilicifolia in Colombia

Scientific classification
- Kingdom: Plantae
- Clade: Tracheophytes
- Clade: Angiosperms
- Clade: Eudicots
- Clade: Asterids
- Order: Asterales
- Family: Asteraceae
- Subfamily: Asteroideae
- Tribe: Senecioneae
- Genus: Scrobicaria; Cass.

Type species
- Scrobicaria ilicifolia (L.f.) B.Nord.

= Scrobicaria =

Genus of plants

Scrobicaria is a genus of South American plants in the groundsel tribe within the daisy family.

Species

- Scrobicaria aquifolia (Cuatrec.) B.Nord. - Venezuela
- Scrobicaria ilicifolia (L.f.) B.Nord. - Colombia
- Scrobicaria soatana S.Díaz & A.Correa - Colombia
