= Io ambondrombeensis =

Scientific classification
- Kingdom: Plantae
- Clade: Tracheophytes
- Clade: Angiosperms
- Clade: Eudicots
- Clade: Asterids
- Order: Asterales
- Family: Asteraceae
- Tribe: Senecioneae
- Subtribe: Senecioninae
- Genus: Io; B.Nord.
- Species: I. ambondrombeensis

Binomial name
- Io ambondrombeensis (Humbert) B.Nord.

Synonyms
- Senecio ambondrombeensis Humbert

Species of flowering plant

Io ambondrombeensis is a species of flowering plant in the family Asteraceae. It is endemic to Madagascar, and is the sole species in genus Io.
