= Robinsonecio =

Scientific classification
- Kingdom: Plantae
- Clade: Tracheophytes
- Clade: Angiosperms
- Clade: Eudicots
- Clade: Asterids
- Order: Asterales
- Family: Asteraceae
- Subfamily: Asteroideae
- Tribe: Senecioneae
- Genus: Robinsonecio; T.M.Barkley & Janovec

Genus of flowering plant

Robinsonecio is a genus of flowering plants belonging to the family Asteraceae.

It is native to Mexico and Guatemala.

The genus name of Robinsonecio is in honour of Harold E. Robinson (1932–2020), an American botanist and an entomologist. It was first described and published in Sida Vol.17 on page 79 in 1996.

Known species, according to Kew;

- Robinsonecio gerberifolius (Sch.Bip. ex Hemsl.) T.M.Barkley & Janovec
- Robinsonecio porphyresthes (T.M.Barkley) T.M.Barkley & Janovec
