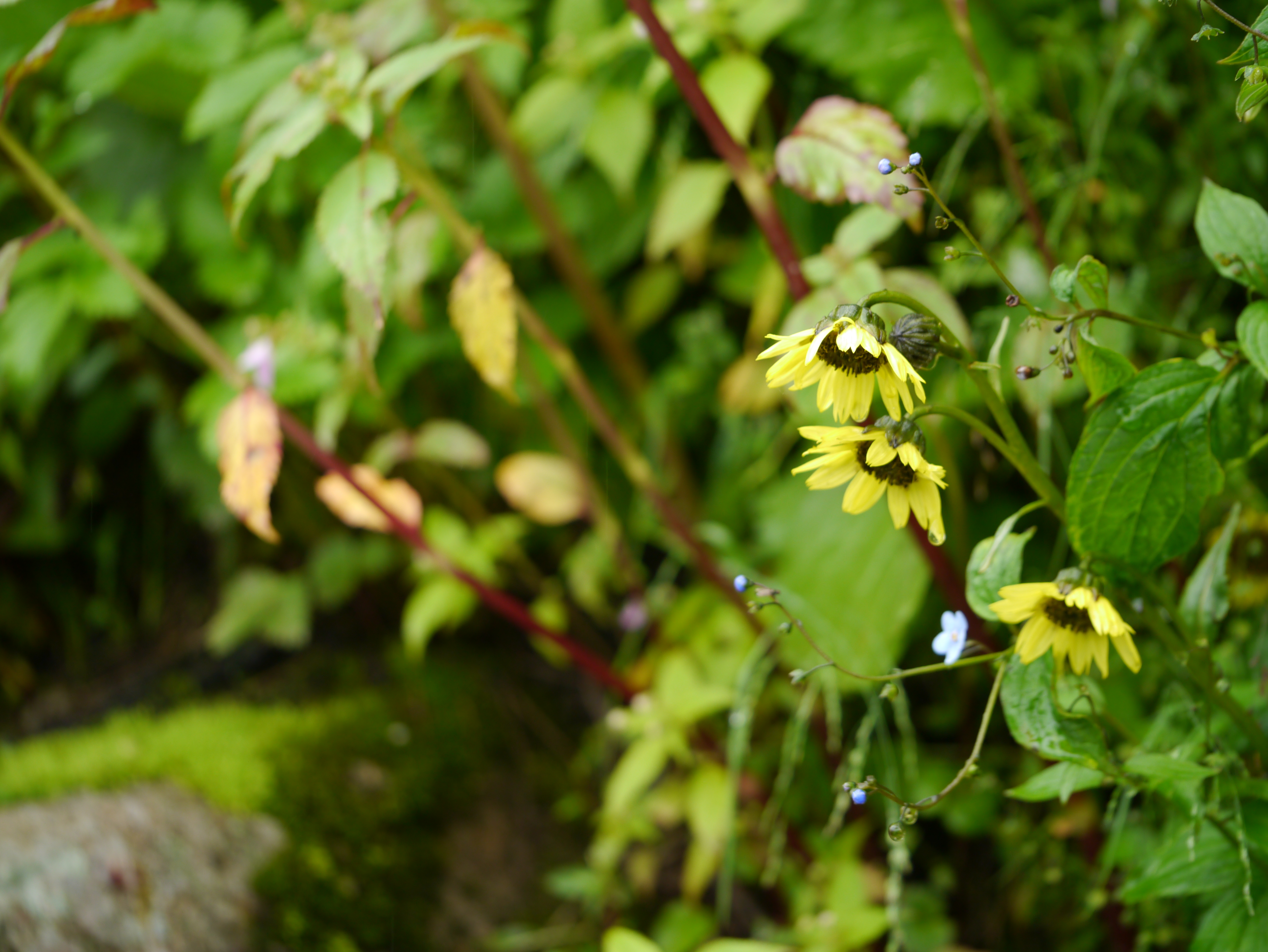
- Cremanthodium arnicoides

Scientific classification
- Kingdom: Plantae
- Clade: Tracheophytes
- Clade: Angiosperms
- Clade: Eudicots
- Clade: Asterids
- Order: Asterales
- Family: Asteraceae
- Subfamily: Asteroideae
- Tribe: Senecioneae
- Genus: Cremanthodium; Benth.

= Cremanthodium =

Genus of flowering plants

Cremanthodium is a large genus of flowering plants in the daisy family.

Cremanthodium is native to China and the Himalayas (India, Nepal, Bhutan, Pakistan, Myanmar, etc.).

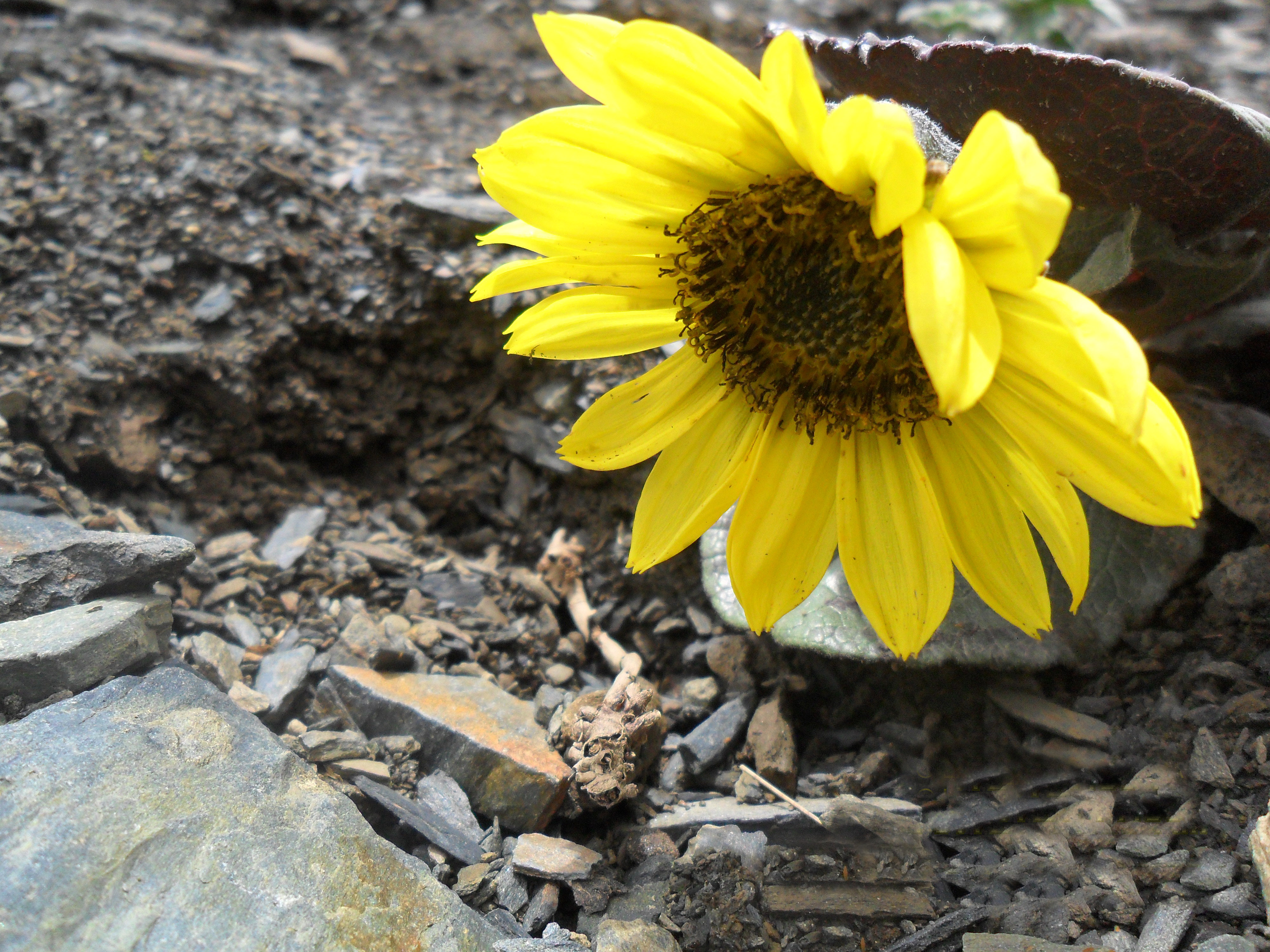
Cremanthodium purpureifolium
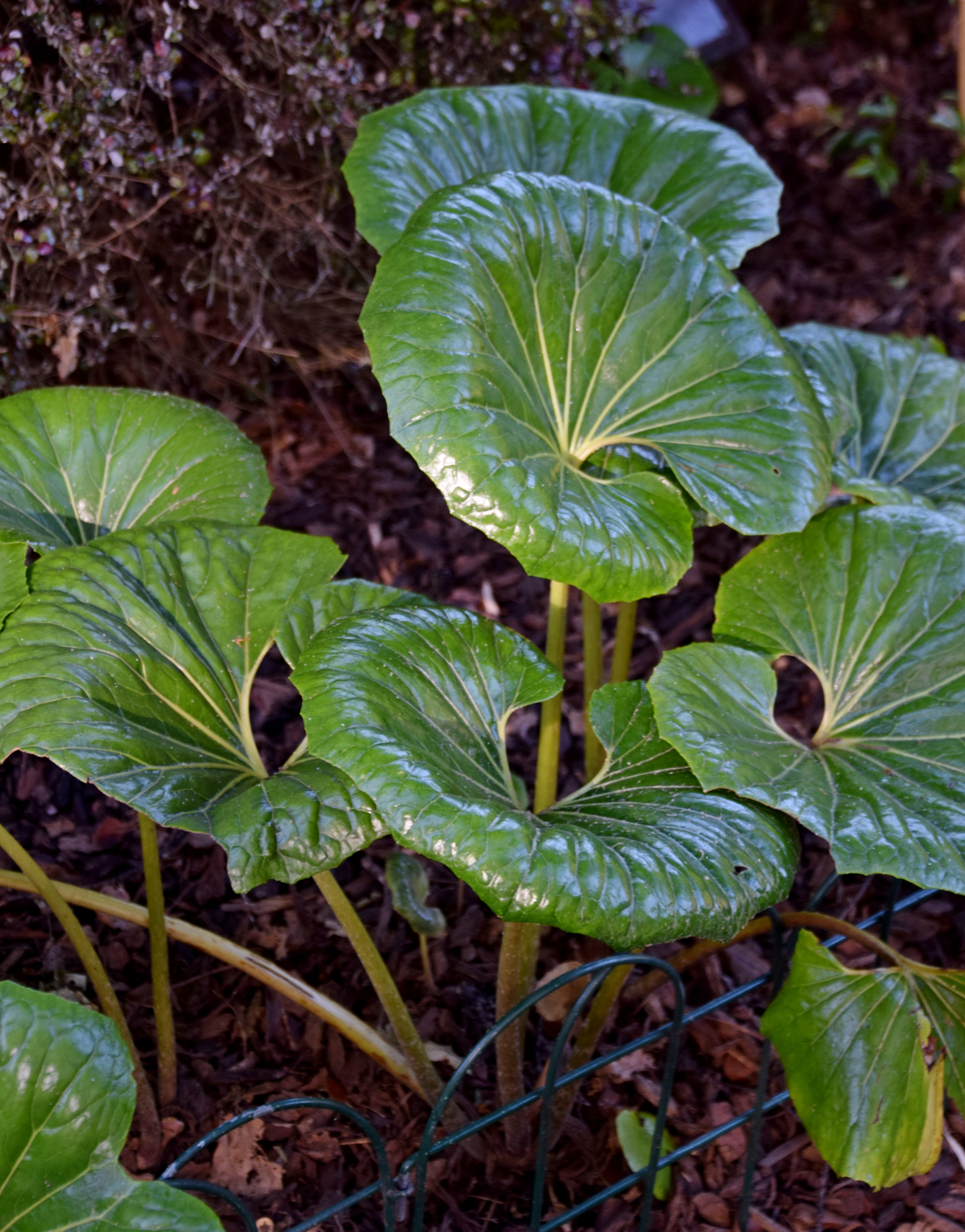
Cremanthodium reniforme
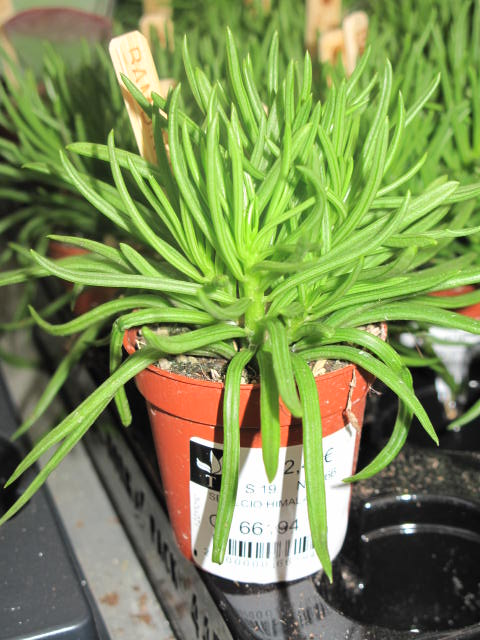
Cremanthodium pinnatifidum

Species

- Cremanthodium angustifolium W.W.Sm.
- Cremanthodium arnicoides (DC. ex Royle) R.D.Good
- Cremanthodium atrocapitatum R.D.Good
- Cremanthodium bhutanicum Ludlow
- Cremanthodium botrycephalum S.W.Liu
- Cremanthodium brachychaetum C.C.Chang
- Cremanthodium brunneopilosum S.W.Liu
- Cremanthodium bulbilliferum W.W.Sm.
- Cremanthodium bupleurifolium W.W.Sm.
- Cremanthodium calcicola W.W.Sm.
- Cremanthodium campanulatum (Franch.) Diels
- Cremanthodium chungdienense Ling & S.W.Liu
- Cremanthodium citriflorum R.D.Good
- Cremanthodium conaense S.W.Liu
- Cremanthodium cordatum S.W.Liu
- Cremanthodium coriaceum S.W.Liu
- Cremanthodium cucullatum Ling & S.W.Liu
- Cremanthodium cyclaminanthum Hand.-Mazz.
- Cremanthodium daochengense Ling & S.W.Liu
- Cremanthodium decaisnei C.B.Clarke
- Cremanthodium delavayi (Franch.) Diels ex H.Lév.
- Cremanthodium discoideum Maxim.
- Cremanthodium dissectum Grierson
- Cremanthodium ellisii (Hook.f.) Kitam.
- Cremanthodium farreri W.W.Sm.
- Cremanthodium forrestii Jeffrey
- Cremanthodium glandulipilosum Y.L.Chen ex S.W.Liu
- Cremanthodium glaucum Hand.-Mazz.
- Cremanthodium helianthus (Franch.) W.W.Sm.
- Cremanthodium heterocephalum Y.L.Chen
- Cremanthodium hookeri C.B.Clarke
- Cremanthodium humile Maxim.
- Cremanthodium laciniatum Ling & Y.L.Chen ex S.W.Liu
- Cremanthodium lineare Maxim.
- Cremanthodium lingulatum S.W.Liu
- Cremanthodium microglossum S.W.Liu
- Cremanthodium microphyllum S.W.Liu
- Cremanthodium nanum (Decne.) W.W.Sm.
- Cremanthodium nepalense Kitam.
- Cremanthodium nervosum S.W.Liu
- Cremanthodium nobile (Franch.) Diels ex H.Lév.
- Cremanthodium oblongatum C.B.Clarke
- Cremanthodium obovatum Ling & S.W.Liu
- Cremanthodium palmatum Benth.
- Cremanthodium petiolatum S.W.Liu
- Cremanthodium phyllodineum S.W.Liu
- Cremanthodium pilosum S.W.Liu
- Cremanthodium pinnatifidum Benth.
- Cremanthodium pinnatisectum (Ludlow) Y.L.Chen & S.W.Liu
- Cremanthodium potaninii C.Winkl.
- Cremanthodium prattii (Hemsl.) R.D.Good
- Cremanthodium principis (Franch.) R.D.Good
- Cremanthodium pseudo-oblongatum R.D.Good
- Cremanthodium pteridophyllum Y.-L.Chen
- Cremanthodium puberulum S.W.Liu
- Cremanthodium pulchrum R.D.Good
- Cremanthodium purpureifolium Kitam.
- Cremanthodium pyrolifolium (H.Lév.) T.L.Ming
- Cremanthodium reniforme (DC.) Benth.
- Cremanthodium rhodocephalum Diels
- Cremanthodium sagittifolium Ling & Y.L.Chen ex S.W.Liu
- Cremanthodium sino-oblongatum R.D.Good
- Cremanthodium smithianum (Hand.-Mazz.) Hand.-Mazz.
- Cremanthodium spathulifolium S.W.Liu
- Cremanthodium stenactinium Diels ex Diels
- Cremanthodium stenoglossum Ling & S.W.Liu
- Cremanthodium suave W.W.Sm.
- Cremanthodium thomsonii C.B.Clarke
- Cremanthodium trilobum S.W.Liu
- Cremanthodium variifolium R.D.Good
- Cremanthodium wardii W.W.Sm.
- Cremanthodium yadongense S.W.Liu
