= Angeldiazia =

Scientific classification
- Kingdom: Plantae
- Clade: Tracheophytes
- Clade: Angiosperms
- Clade: Eudicots
- Clade: Asterids
- Order: Asterales
- Family: Asteraceae
- Subfamily: Asteroideae
- Tribe: Senecioneae
- Genus: Angeldiazia; M.O.Dillon & Zapata
- Species: A. weigendii

Binomial name
- Angeldiazia weigendii M.O.Dillon & Zapata

Genus of flowering plants

Angeldiazia is a genus of flowering plants belonging to the family Asteraceae. It contains a single species, Angeldiazia weigendii.

Its native range is Peru.
