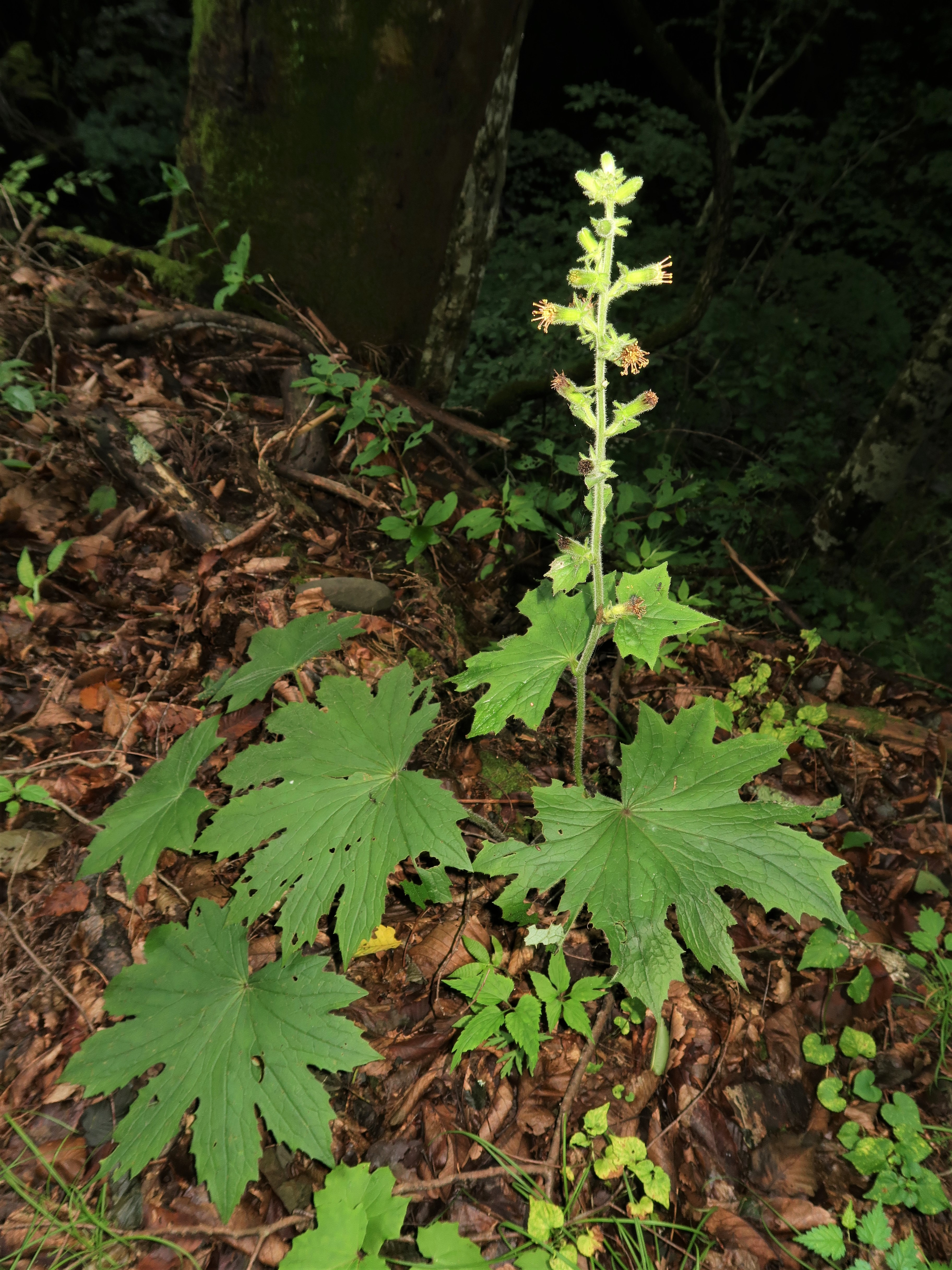
- Miricacalia makinoana

Scientific classification
- Kingdom: Plantae
- Clade: Tracheophytes
- Clade: Angiosperms
- Clade: Eudicots
- Clade: Asterids
- Order: Asterales
- Family: Asteraceae
- Subfamily: Asteroideae
- Tribe: Senecioneae
- Genus: Miricacalia; Kitamura
- Species: M. makineana

Binomial name
- Miricacalia makineana (Yatabe) Kitam.

Synonyms
- Senecio makineanus Yatabe; Cacalia iinumae Makino; Cacalia makineanus (Yatabe) Makino

= Miricacalia =

Genus of flowering plants

Miricacalia is a genus of flowering plants in the groundsel tribe within the daisy family.

Species

There is only one accepted species, Miricacalia makineana, native to Japan.

formerly included

see Parasenecio

- Miricacalia firma (Kom.) Nakai - Parasenecio firmus (Kom.) Y.L.Chen
