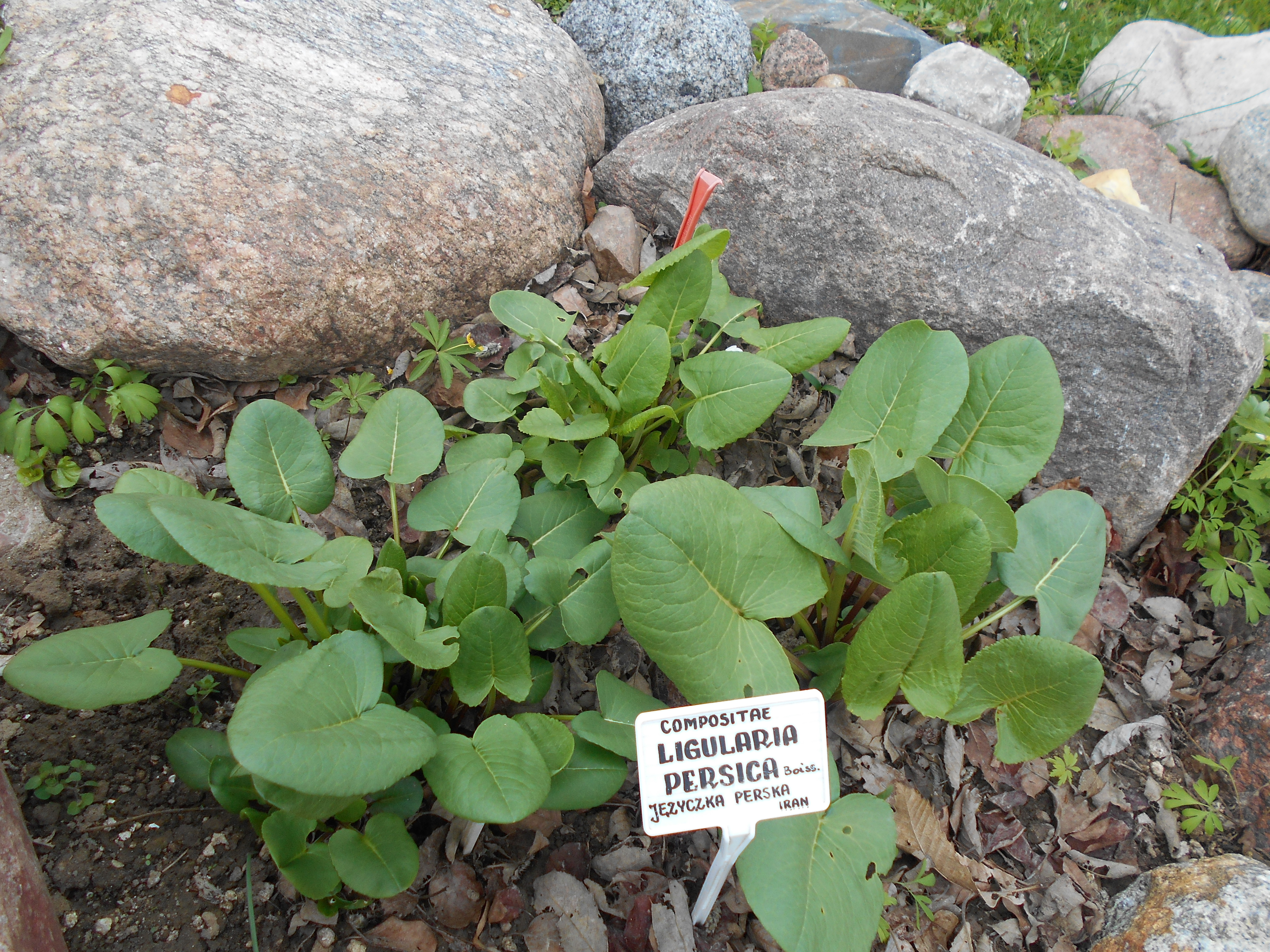
- Dolichorrhiza persica

Scientific classification
- Kingdom: Plantae
- Clade: Embryophytes
- Clade: Tracheophytes
- Clade: Angiosperms
- Clade: Eudicots
- Clade: Asterids
- Order: Asterales
- Family: Asteraceae
- Subfamily: Asteroideae
- Tribe: Senecioneae
- Genus: Dolichorrhiza (Pojark.) Galushko

Synonyms
- Ligularia subg. Dolichorrhiza Pojark.

= Dolichorrhiza =

Genus of flowering plants

Dolichorrhiza is a genus of flowering plants in the sunflower family.

Species

- Dolichorrhiza caucasica (M.Bieb.) Galushko - Armenia, Republic of Georgia, Azerbaijan
- Dolichorrhiza correvoniana (Albov) Galushko - Republic of Georgia
- Dolichorrhiza persica (Boiss.) B.Nord. - Iran
- Dolichorrhiza renifolia (C.A.Mey.) Galushko - Republic of Georgia
