= Arbelaezaster =

Scientific classification
- Kingdom: Plantae
- Clade: Tracheophytes
- Clade: Angiosperms
- Clade: Eudicots
- Clade: Asterids
- Order: Asterales
- Family: Asteraceae
- Subfamily: Asteroideae
- Tribe: Senecioneae
- Genus: Arbelaezaster; Cuatrec.
- Species: A. ellsworthii

Binomial name
- Arbelaezaster ellsworthii (Cuatrec.) Cuatrec.

Synonyms
- Senecio ellsworthii Cuatrec.

Genus of flowering plants

Arbelaezaster is a genus of flowering plants in the daisy family.

There is only one known species, Arbelaezaster ellsworthii, native to Colombia and Venezuela.
