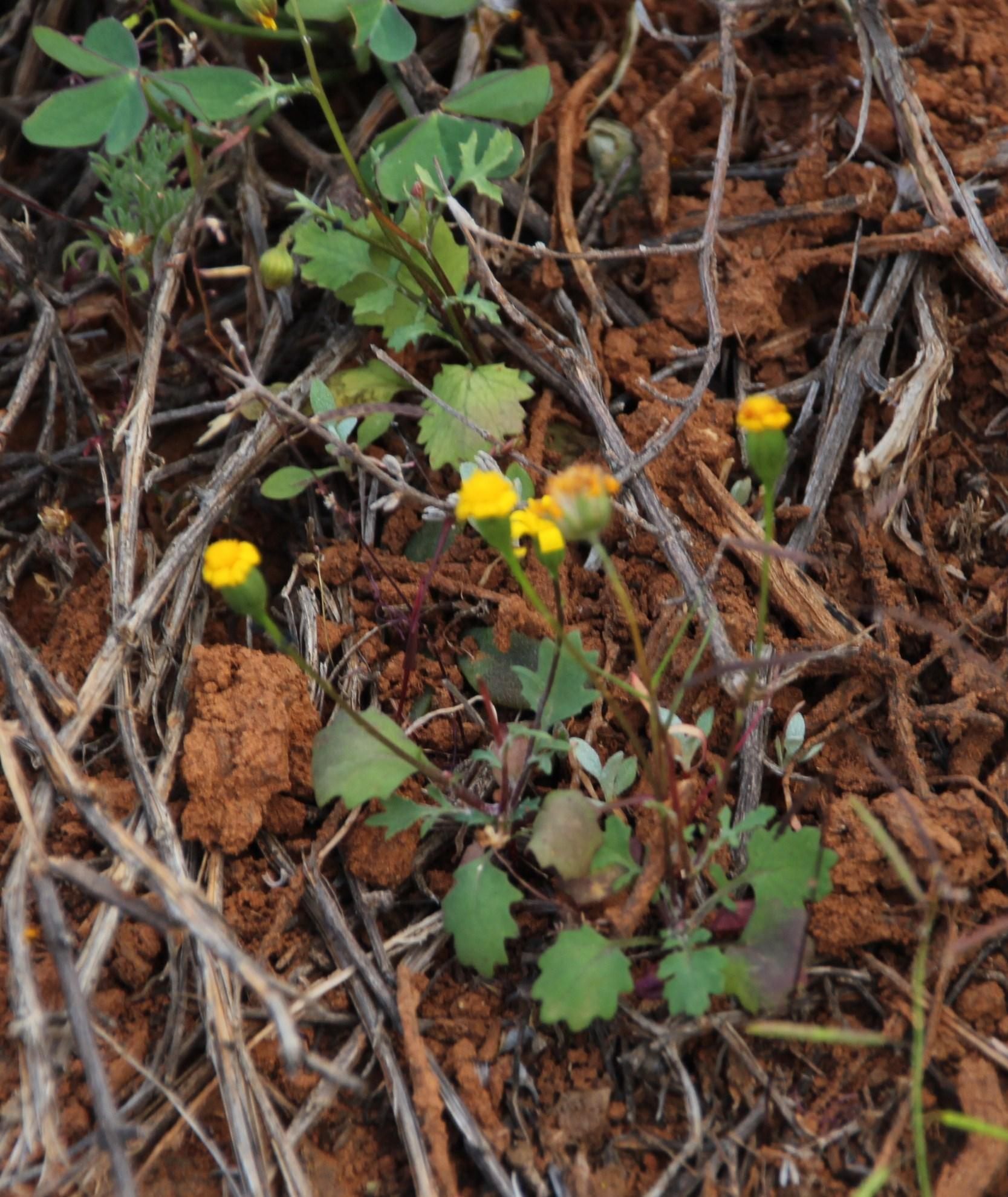
- Stilpnogyne bellidioides

Scientific classification
- Kingdom: Plantae
- Clade: Tracheophytes
- Clade: Angiosperms
- Clade: Eudicots
- Clade: Asterids
- Order: Asterales
- Family: Asteraceae
- Subfamily: Asteroideae
- Tribe: Senecioneae
- Genus: Stilpnogyne; DC.
- Species: S. bellioides

Binomial name
- Stilpnogyne bellioides DC.

= Stilpnogyne =

Genus of plants

Stilpnogyne is a genus of flowering plants in the groundsel tribe within the sunflower family. The only known species is Stilpnogyne bellioides, native to the Cape Provinces of South Africa.
