= Dicercoclados =

Scientific classification
- Kingdom: Plantae
- Clade: Tracheophytes
- Clade: Angiosperms
- Clade: Eudicots
- Clade: Asterids
- Order: Asterales
- Family: Asteraceae
- Subfamily: Asteroideae
- Tribe: Senecioneae
- Genus: Dicercoclados; C.Jeffrey & Y.L.Chen
- Species: D. triplinervis

Binomial name
- Dicercoclados triplinervis C.Jeffrey & Y.L.Chen

Genus of flowering plants

Dicercoclados is a genus of flowering plants in the daisy family.

There is only one known species, Dicercoclados triplinervis, endemic to Guizhou Province in China.
