= Chaetacalia =

Scientific classification
- Kingdom: Plantae
- Clade: Tracheophytes
- Clade: Angiosperms
- Clade: Eudicots
- Clade: Asterids
- Order: Asterales
- Family: Asteraceae
- Tribe: Senecioneae
- Subtribe: Senecioninae
- Genus: Chaetacalia; Pruski
- Species: C. stylotricha

Binomial name
- Chaetacalia stylotricha (Cabrera) Pruski

Synonyms
- Lasiocephalus stylotrichus (Cabrera) Cuatrec.; Senecio stylotrichus Cabrera

Genus of flowering plants

Chaetacalia is a genus of flowering plants in the family Asteraceae. It includes a single species, Chaetacalia stylotricha, an herbaceous perennial endemic to Santa Cruz Department of Bolivia.

The species was first described as Senecio stylotrichus by Ángel Lulio Cabrera in 1950. In 2021 John Francis Pruski placed the species in the new monotypic genus Chaetacalia as Chaetacalia stylotricha.
