= Bolandia =

Scientific classification
- Kingdom: Plantae
- Clade: Tracheophytes
- Clade: Angiosperms
- Clade: Eudicots
- Clade: Asterids
- Order: Asterales
- Family: Asteraceae
- Subfamily: Asteroideae
- Tribe: Senecioneae
- Genus: Bolandia; Cron

Genus of flowering plants

Bolandia is a genus of flowering plants belonging to the family Asteraceae. It is endemic to the Cape Provinces of South Africa.

Species:

- Bolandia argillacea (Cron) Cron
- Bolandia elongata (L.f.) J.C.Manning & Cron
- Bolandia glabrifolia (DC.) J.C.Manning & Cron
- Bolandia pedunculosa (DC.) Cron
- Bolandia pinnatifida (Thunb.) J.C.Manning & Cron
