= Pippenalia =

Scientific classification
- Kingdom: Plantae
- Clade: Tracheophytes
- Clade: Angiosperms
- Clade: Eudicots
- Clade: Asterids
- Order: Asterales
- Family: Asteraceae
- Subfamily: Asteroideae
- Tribe: Senecioneae
- Genus: Pippenalia; R.McVaugh
- Species: P. delphiniifolia

Binomial name
- Pippenalia delphiniifolia (Rydb.) R.McVaugh

Synonyms
- Odontotrichum delphiniifolium Rydb.

Genus of flowering plants

Pippenalia is a genus of Mexican plants in the groundsel tribe within the sunflower family.

The genus is named in honor of botanist Richard Wayne Pippen.

Species

The only known species is Pippenalia delphiniifolia, native to Mexico (Chihuahua, Zacatecas, Aguascalientes, Jalisco, Durango).
