= Dauresia =

Scientific classification
- Kingdom: Plantae
- Clade: Tracheophytes
- Clade: Angiosperms
- Clade: Eudicots
- Clade: Asterids
- Order: Asterales
- Family: Asteraceae
- Subfamily: Asteroideae
- Tribe: Senecioneae
- Genus: Dauresia; B.Nord. & Pelser

Genus of flowering plants

Dauresia is a genus of flowering plants belonging to the family Asteraceae.

Its native range is Namibia.

Species:

- Dauresia alliariifolia (O.Hoffm.) B.Nord. & Pelser
- Dauresia flava B.Nord.
