= Stenops =

Scientific classification
- Kingdom: Plantae
- Clade: Tracheophytes
- Clade: Angiosperms
- Clade: Eudicots
- Clade: Asterids
- Order: Asterales
- Family: Asteraceae
- Subfamily: Asteroideae
- Tribe: Senecioneae
- Genus: Stenops; B.Nord.

Type species
- Stenops helodes B.Nord.

Synonyms
- Pseudocadiscus Lisowski

Genus of plants

Stenops is a genus of African flowering plants in the daisy family.

Species

- Stenops helodes B.Nord.
- Stenops zairensis (Lisowski) B.Nord.
