= Odontocline =

Scientific classification
- Kingdom: Plantae
- Clade: Tracheophytes
- Clade: Angiosperms
- Clade: Eudicots
- Clade: Asterids
- Order: Asterales
- Family: Asteraceae
- Subfamily: Asteroideae
- Tribe: Senecioneae
- Genus: Odontocline; B.Nord.

Type species
- Odontocline glabra (Sw.) B.Nord.

Genus of flowering plants

Odontocline is a genus of Jamaican flowering plants in the daisy family.

Species

All the species are native to Jamaica.

- Odontocline dolichantha (Krug & Urb.) B.Nord.
- Odontocline fadyenii (Griseb.) B.Nord.
- Odontocline glabra (Sw.) B.Nord.
- Odontocline hollickii (Britton ex Greenm.) B.Nord.
- Odontocline laciniata (Sw.) B.Nord.
- Odontocline tercentenariae (Proctor) B.Nord.
