= Lundinia =

Scientific classification
- Kingdom: Plantae
- Clade: Tracheophytes
- Clade: Angiosperms
- Clade: Eudicots
- Clade: Asterids
- Order: Asterales
- Family: Asteraceae
- Subfamily: Asteroideae
- Tribe: Senecioneae
- Genus: Lundinia; B.Nord.
- Species: L. plumbea

Binomial name
- Lundinia plumbea (Griseb.) B.Nord.

Synonyms
- Senecio plumbeus Griseb.

Species of flowering plant

Lundinia is a genus of flowering plants belonging to the family Asteraceae. It only contains one known species, Lundinia plumbea.

It is native to Cuba and the Dominican Republic.

The genus name of Lundinia is in honour of Roger Lundin (1955–2005), a Swedish botanist at the natural history museum in Stockholm. The Latin specific epithet of plumbea refers to plumbeus meaning leaden.

The genus was first described and published in Compositae Newslett. Vol.44 on pages 64–66 in 2006.
