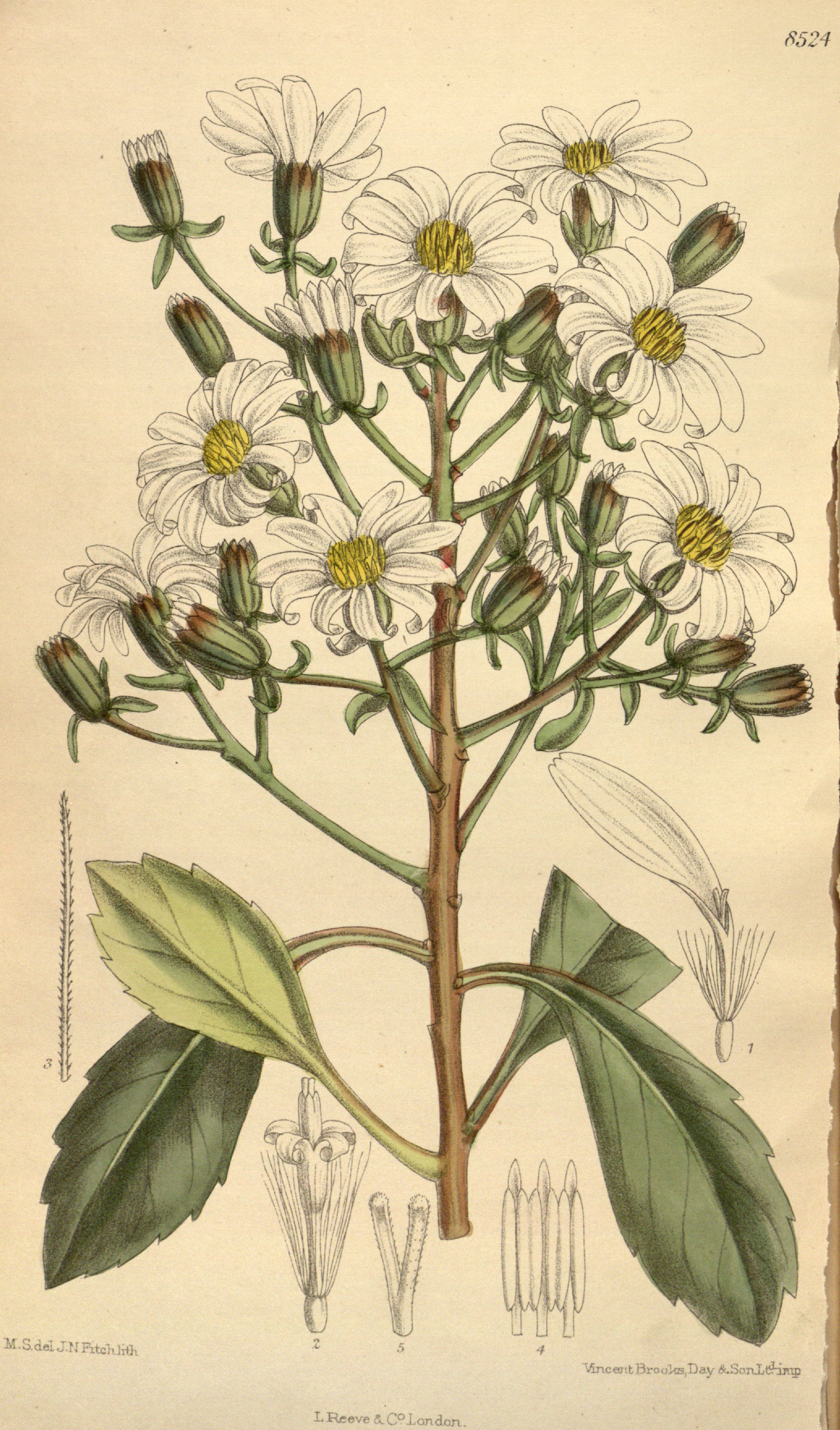

Scientific classification
- Kingdom: Plantae
- Clade: Tracheophytes
- Clade: Angiosperms
- Clade: Eudicots
- Clade: Asterids
- Order: Asterales
- Family: Asteraceae
- Subfamily: Asteroideae
- Tribe: Senecioneae
- Genus: Urostemon; B.Nord.
- Species: U. kirkii

Binomial name
- Urostemon kirkii (Hook.f. ex Kirk) B.Nord.

Synonyms
- List (Species): Aster retroflexus A.Cunn. ex Hook.f.; Brachyglottis kirkii (Hook.f. ex Kirk) C.J.Webb; Senecio glastifolius Hook.f.; Senecio kirkii Hook.f. ex Kirk; Senecio neozeylandicus Druce; Solidago arborescens A.Cunn. ex Hook.f.

= Urostemon =

Genus of flowering plants

Urostemon is a genus of flowering plants belonging to the family Asteraceae. The genus is monotypic, being represented by the single species Urostemon kirkii found in New Zealand. Endemic to North Island, usually growing as a small epiphytic bush. It is classified as nationally vulnerable.
