= Ligulariopsis =

Scientific classification
- Kingdom: Plantae
- Clade: Embryophytes
- Clade: Tracheophytes
- Clade: Angiosperms
- Clade: Eudicots
- Clade: Asterids
- Order: Asterales
- Family: Asteraceae
- Subfamily: Asteroideae
- Tribe: Senecioneae
- Genus: Ligulariopsis; Y.L. Chen
- Species: L. shichuana

Binomial name
- Ligulariopsis shichuana Y.L. Chen

Synonyms
- Cacalia longispica Z. Ying Zhang & Y. H. Guo 1985, illegitimate homonym not Hand.-Mazz. 1938

Genus of flowering plants

Ligulariopsis is a genus of flowering plants in the groundsel tribe within the sunflower family.

== Species ==
There is only one known species, Ligulariopsis shichuana, native to Gansu and Shaanxi Provinces in China.
