= Dendrocacalia =

Scientific classification
- Kingdom: Plantae
- Clade: Tracheophytes
- Clade: Angiosperms
- Clade: Eudicots
- Clade: Asterids
- Order: Asterales
- Family: Asteraceae
- Subfamily: Asteroideae
- Tribe: Senecioneae
- Genus: Dendrocacalia (Nakai) Nakai ex Tuyama
- Species: D. crepidifolia

Binomial name
- Dendrocacalia crepidifolia (Nakai) Nakai

Synonyms
- Dendrocacalia crepididifolia Nakai, spelling variant; Cacalia crepidifolia Nakai

Genus of flowering plants

Dendrocacalia is a genus of flowering plants in the daisy family.

There is only one known species, Dendrocacalia crepidifolia, endemic to Haha-jima (Haha Island, one of Ogasawara Islands (Bonin Islands) in the North Pacific, part of Japan).
