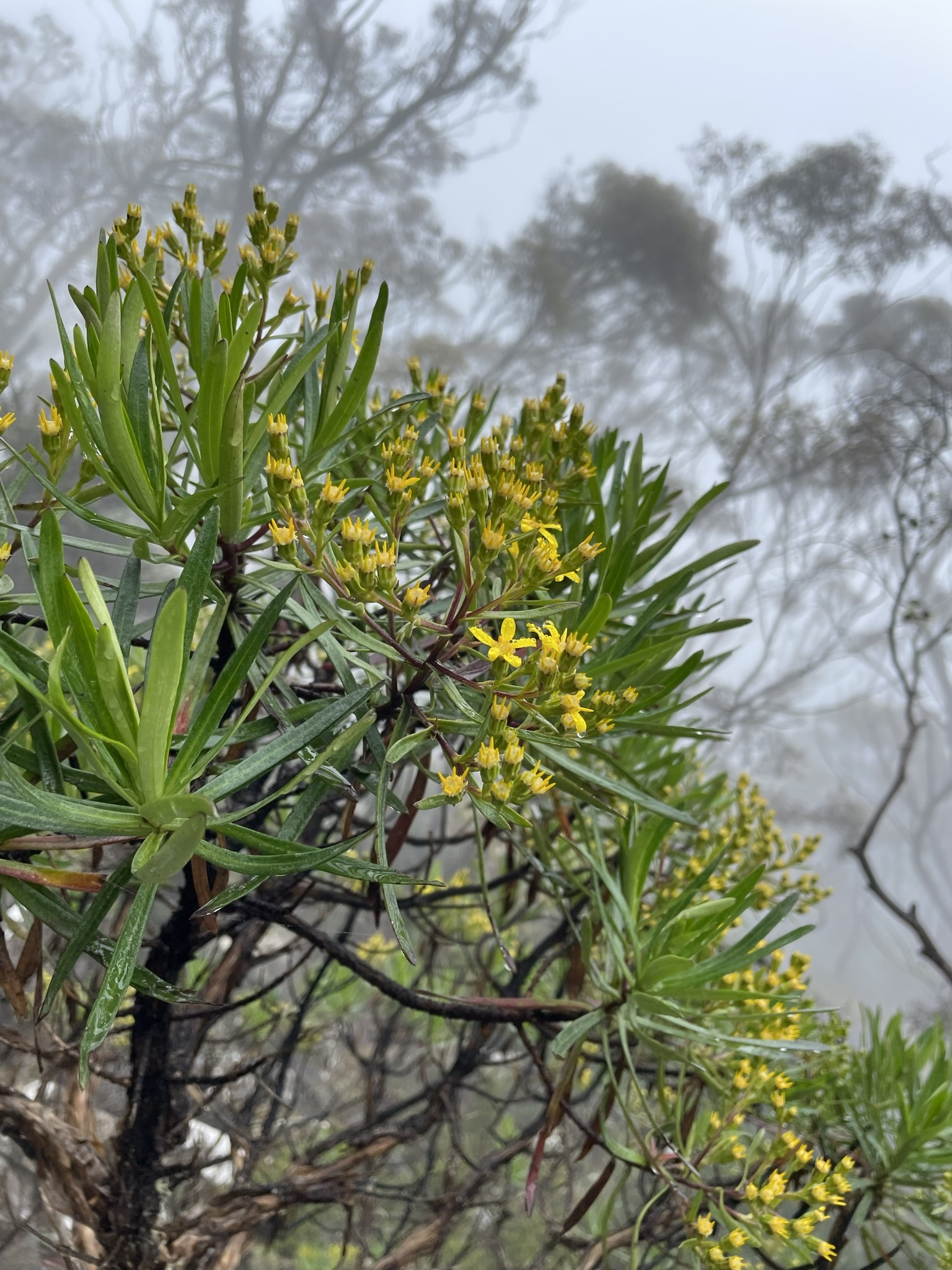

Scientific classification
- Kingdom: Plantae
- Clade: Tracheophytes
- Clade: Angiosperms
- Clade: Eudicots
- Clade: Asterids
- Order: Asterales
- Family: Asteraceae
- Subfamily: Asteroideae
- Tribe: Senecioneae
- Genus: Centropappus; Hook.f.
- Species: C. brunonis

Binomial name
- Centropappus brunonis Hook.f.

= Centropappus =

Centropappus brunonis

Genus of flowering plants

Centropappus is a genus of flowering plants belonging to the family Asteraceae. It contains a single species, Centropappus brunonis.

It is native to the mountains of Tasmania.
