= Oldfeltia =

Scientific classification
- Kingdom: Plantae
- Clade: Tracheophytes
- Clade: Angiosperms
- Clade: Eudicots
- Clade: Asterids
- Order: Asterales
- Family: Asteraceae
- Subfamily: Asteroideae
- Tribe: Senecioneae
- Genus: Oldfeltia; B.Nord. & Lundin
- Species: O. polyphlebia

Binomial name
- Oldfeltia polyphlebia (Griseb.) B.Nord. & Lundin

Synonyms
- Pentacalia polyphlebia (Griseb.) Borhidi; Senecio polyphlebius Griseb.

Species of flowering plant

Oldfeltia is a genus of flowering plants belonging to the family Asteraceae. It contains only one known species, Oldfeltia polyphlebia.

It is native to Cuba.

The genus name of Oldfeltia is in honour of Karin Oldfelt Hjertonsson (b. 1940), a Swedish artist who collaborated with the author Bertil Nordenstam. Hjertonsson was the Swedish ambassador to Cuba for several years. The Latin specific epithet of polyphlebia is a portmanteau word, 'poly-' is derived from Greek πολύς (polús) meaning many or much, and '-phlebia' means "veins". Both the genus and species were first described and published in Compositae Newslett. Vol. 38 on pages 66–67 in 2002.
