= Psacaliopsis =

Scientific classification
- Kingdom: Plantae
- Clade: Tracheophytes
- Clade: Angiosperms
- Clade: Eudicots
- Clade: Asterids
- Order: Asterales
- Family: Asteraceae
- Subfamily: Asteroideae
- Tribe: Senecioneae
- Genus: Psacaliopsis; H.Rob. & Brettell

Type species
- Senecio purpusii Greenman ex Brandegee

Genus of plants

Psacaliopsis is a genus of Mexican plants in the groundsel tribe within the daisy family.

Species

- Psacaliopsis macdonaldii (B.L.Turner) C.Jeffrey - Oaxaca
- Psacaliopsis paneroi (B.L.Turner) C.Jeffrey - Oaxaca
- Psacaliopsis purpusii (Greenm. ex Brandegee) H.Rob. & Brettell - Oaxaca

formerly included

see Roldana Senecio

- Psacaliopsis pinetorum (Hemsl.) Funston & Villaseñor - Roldana pinetorum (Hemsl.) H.Rob. & Brettell
- Psacaliopsis pudica (Standl. & Steyerm.) H.Rob. & Brettell - Senecio nubivagus L.O.Williams
