= Digitacalia =

Scientific classification
- Kingdom: Plantae
- Clade: Embryophytes
- Clade: Tracheophytes
- Clade: Angiosperms
- Clade: Eudicots
- Clade: Asterids
- Order: Asterales
- Family: Asteraceae
- Subfamily: Asteroideae
- Tribe: Senecioneae
- Genus: Digitacalia; Pippen

Type species
- Cacalia jatrophoides Kunth.

Genus of flowering plants

Digitacalia is a genus of flowering plants in the daisy family.

Species

All known species are endemic to Mexico

- Digitacalia chiapensis (Hemsl.) Pippen - Chiapas
- Digitacalia crypta B.L.Turner - Oaxaca
- Digitacalia hintoniorum B.L.Turner - Michoacán
- Digitacalia jatrophoides (Kunth) Pippen - Zacatecas, Jalisco, Michoacán, Guerrero, Oaxaca, Guanajuato, Colima
- Digitacalia napeifolia (DC.) Pippen - Oaxaca, Michoacán

formerly included

- Digitacalia heteroidea (Klatt) Pippen - Synonym of Roldana heteroidea (Klatt) H.Rob. & Brettell
