= Nelsonianthus =

Scientific classification
- Kingdom: Plantae
- Clade: Tracheophytes
- Clade: Angiosperms
- Clade: Eudicots
- Clade: Asterids
- Order: Asterales
- Family: Asteraceae
- Subfamily: Asteroideae
- Tribe: Senecioneae
- Genus: Nelsonianthus; H.Rob. & Brettell

Genus of flowering plant

Nelsonianthus is a genus of flowering plants belonging to the family Asteraceae.

It is native to southern Mexico and Guatemala.

The genus name of Nelsonianthus is in honour of Edward William Nelson (1855–1934), an American naturalist and ethnologist. It was first described and published in Phytologia Vol.27 on page 54 in 1973.

== Known species ==
According to Kew:

- Nelsonianthus epiphyticus H.Rob. & Brettell
- Nelsonianthus tapianus (B.L.Turner) C.Jeffrey
