= Graphistylis =

Scientific classification
- Kingdom: Plantae
- Clade: Embryophytes
- Clade: Tracheophytes
- Clade: Angiosperms
- Clade: Eudicots
- Clade: Asterids
- Order: Asterales
- Family: Asteraceae
- Subfamily: Asteroideae
- Tribe: Senecioneae
- Genus: Graphistylis; B.Nord.

Type species
- Graphistylis organensis (Casar.) B.Nord.

Genus of flowering plants

Graphistylis is a genus of Brazilian flowering plants in the daisy family.

Species

- Graphistylis argyrotricha (Dusén) B.Nord. - Minas Gerais, Rio de Janeiro
- Graphistylis cuneifolia (Gardner) B.Nord. - Rio de Janeiro
- Graphistylis dichroa (Bong.) D.J.N.Hind - Minas Gerais, Rio de Janeiro, Santa Catarina, São Paulo
- Graphistylis itatiaiae (Dusén) B.Nord. - Minas Gerais, Rio de Janeiro, São Paulo
- Graphistylis oreophila (Dusén) B.Nord. - Rio de Janeiro, Santa Catarina, São Paulo
- Graphistylis organensis (Casar.) B.Nord. - Espírito Santo, Minas Gerais, Rio de Janeiro, Santa Catarina, São Paulo
- Graphistylis riopretensis A.M.Teles & B.Nord. - Minas Gerais
- Graphistylis toledoi (Cabrera) B.Nord. - São Paulo
