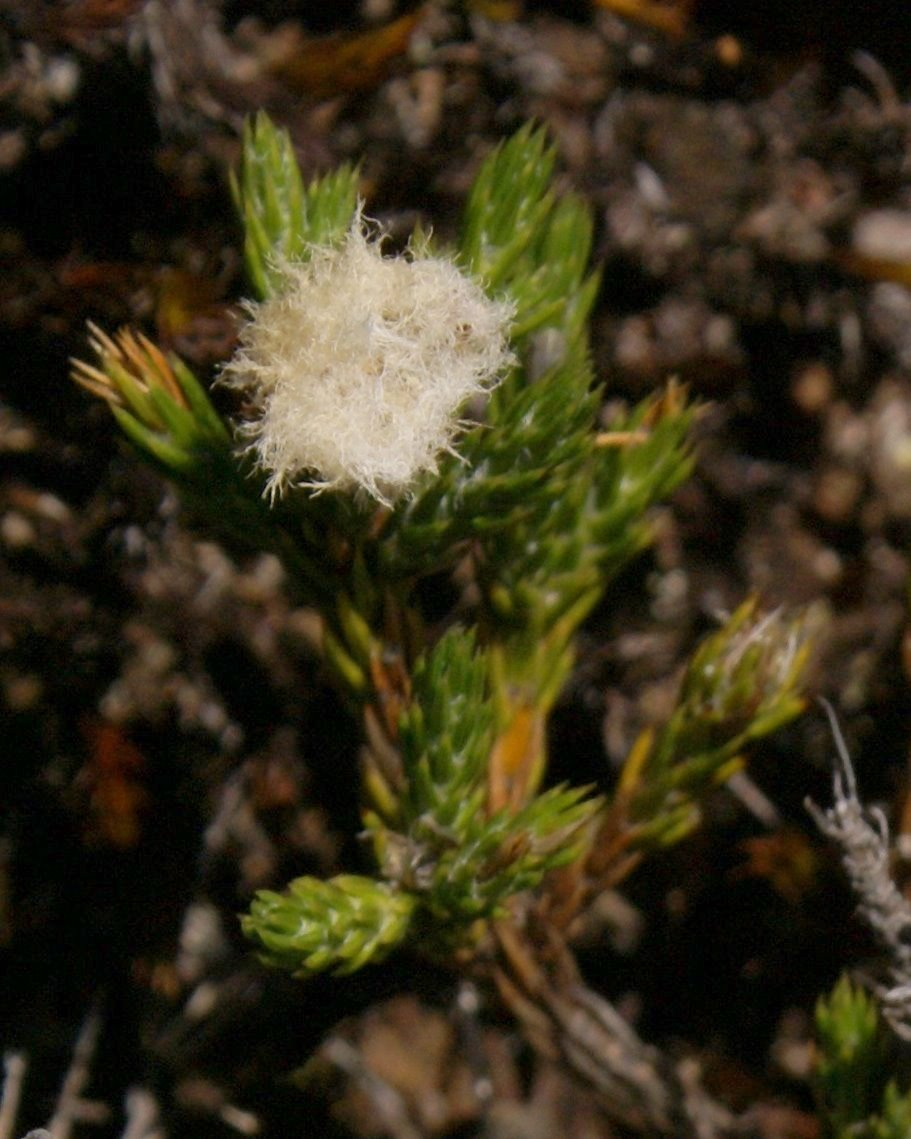
- Eriothrix lycopodioides

Scientific classification
- Kingdom: Plantae
- Clade: Tracheophytes
- Clade: Angiosperms
- Clade: Eudicots
- Clade: Asterids
- Order: Asterales
- Family: Asteraceae
- Subfamily: Asteroideae
- Tribe: Senecioneae
- Genus: Eriothrix; Cass.

Type species
- Eriothrix juniperifolia (syn. of E. lycopodioides) Cass.

Synonyms
- Eriotrix, misspelling

= Eriothrix (plant) =

Genus of flowering plants

Eriothrix is a genus of flowering plants in the daisy family, endemic to the Island of Réunion in the Indian Ocean, part of the French Republic.

Species

- Eriothrix commersonii Cadet - Réunion
- Eriothrix lycopodioides (Lam.) DC. - Réunion
