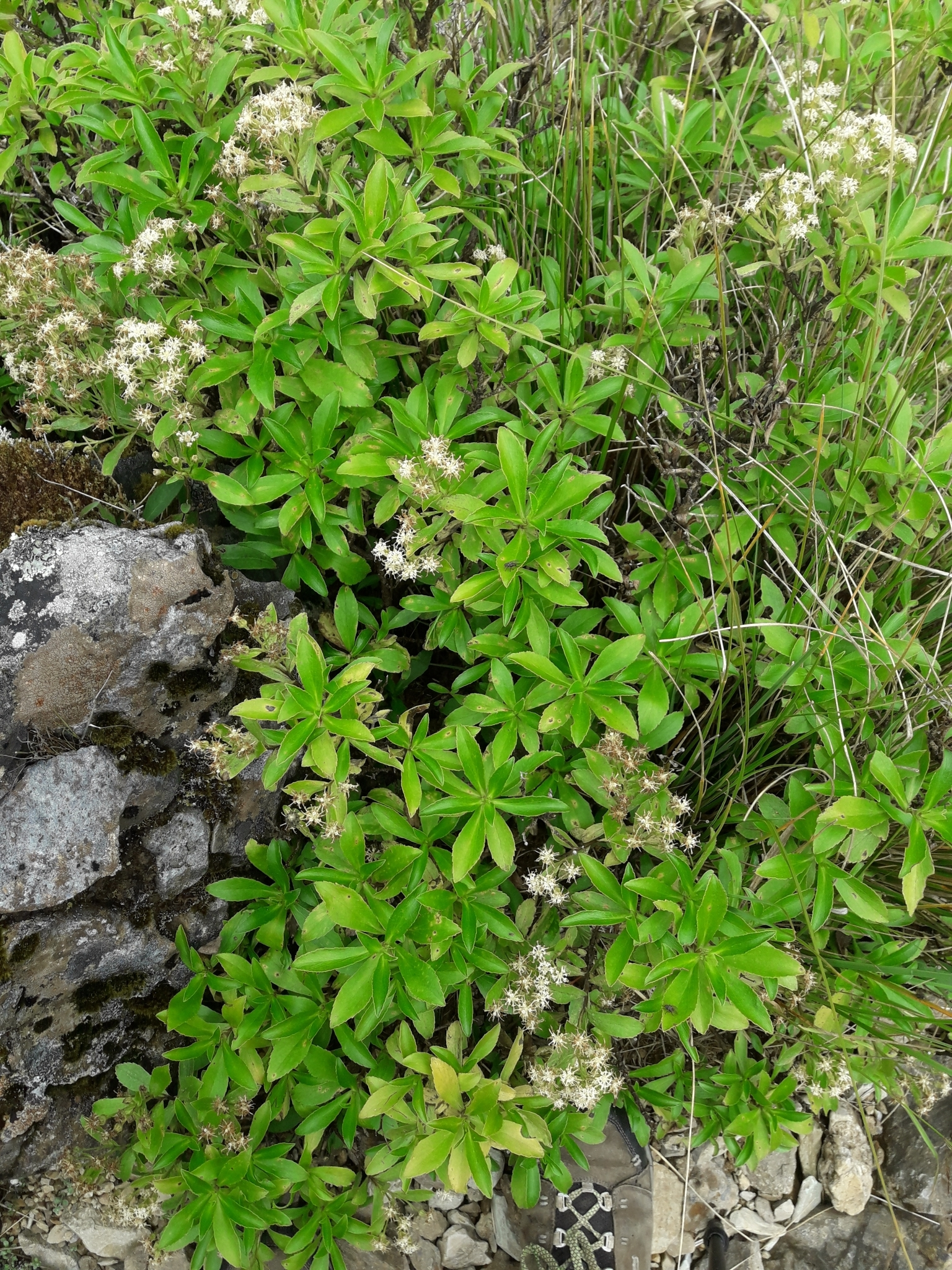

Scientific classification
- Kingdom: Plantae
- Clade: Embryophytes
- Clade: Tracheophytes
- Clade: Angiosperms
- Clade: Eudicots
- Clade: Asterids
- Order: Asterales
- Family: Asteraceae
- Subfamily: Asteroideae
- Tribe: Senecioneae
- Genus: Traversia; Hook.f.
- Species: T. baccharoides

Binomial name
- Traversia baccharoides Hook.f.

Synonyms
- Senecio geminatus Kirk

= Traversia =

Genus of land plants

Traversia is a genus of New Zealand plants in the groundsel tribe within the daisy family.

Species

The only known species is Traversia baccharoides, found only in New Zealand.
