= Antillanthus =

Scientific classification
- Kingdom: Plantae
- Clade: Tracheophytes
- Clade: Angiosperms
- Clade: Eudicots
- Clade: Asterids
- Order: Asterales
- Family: Asteraceae
- Subfamily: Asteroideae
- Tribe: Senecioneae
- Genus: Antillanthus; B.Nord.

Type species
- Antillanthus ekmanii (Alain) B.Nord.

Genus of flowering plants

Antillanthus is a genus of the tribe Senecioneae in the family Asteraceae described as a genus in 2006. Many members of this genus were previously listed as Pentacalia and Senecio.

The entire genus is endemic to Cuba. IPNI

Species

1. Antillanthus acunae (Borhidi) B.Nord. - Pentacalia acunae Borhidi
2. Antillanthus almironcillo (M. Gomez) B. Nord. - Senecio almironcillo M.Gomez - Pentacalia almironcillo (M. Gomez) Proctor
3. Antillanthus azulensis (Alain) B. Nord. - Senecio azulensis Alain
4. Antillanthus biseriatus (Alain) B. Nord. - Senecio biseriatus Alain
5. Antillanthus carinatus (Greenm.) B. Nord. - Senecio carinatus Greenm. - Pentacalia carinata (Greenm.) Borhidi
6. Antillanthus cubensis (Greenm.) B. Nord. - Senecio cubensis Greenm. - Pentacalia cubensis (Greenm.) Borhidi
7. Antillanthus ekmanii (Alain) B.Nord. - Senecio ekmanii Alain
8. Antillanthus eriocarphus (Greenm.) B. Nord. -Senecio eriocarphus Greenm. - Pentacalia eriocarpha (Greenm.) Borhidi
9. Antillanthus leucolepis (Greenm.) B. Nord. - Senecio leucolepis Greenm. - Pentacalia leucolepis (Greenm.) Borhidi
10. Antillanthus moaensis (Alain) B. Nord. - Senecio moaensis Alain - Pentacalia moaensis (Alain) Borhidi
11. Antillanthus moldenkei (Greenm. & Alain) B. Nord. - Senecio moldenkei Greenm. & Alain
12. Antillanthus pachylepis (Greenm.) B. Nord. - Senecio pachylepis Greenm.
13. Antillanthus pachypodus (Greenm.) B. Nord. - Senecio pachypodus Greenm. - Pentacalia pachypoda (Greenm.) Borhidi
14. Antillanthus saugetii (Alain) B. Nord. - Senecio saugetii Alain - Pentacalia saugetii (Alain) Borhidi
15. Antillanthus shaferi (Greenm.) B. Nord. - Senecio shaferi Greenm. - Pentacalia shaferi (Greenm.) Borhidi
16. Antillanthus subsquarrosus (Greenm.) B. Nord. - Senecio subsquarrosus Greenm.
17. Antillanthus trichotomus (Greenm.) B. Nord. - Senecio trichotomus Greenm. - Pentacalia trichotoma (Greenm.) Borhidi
