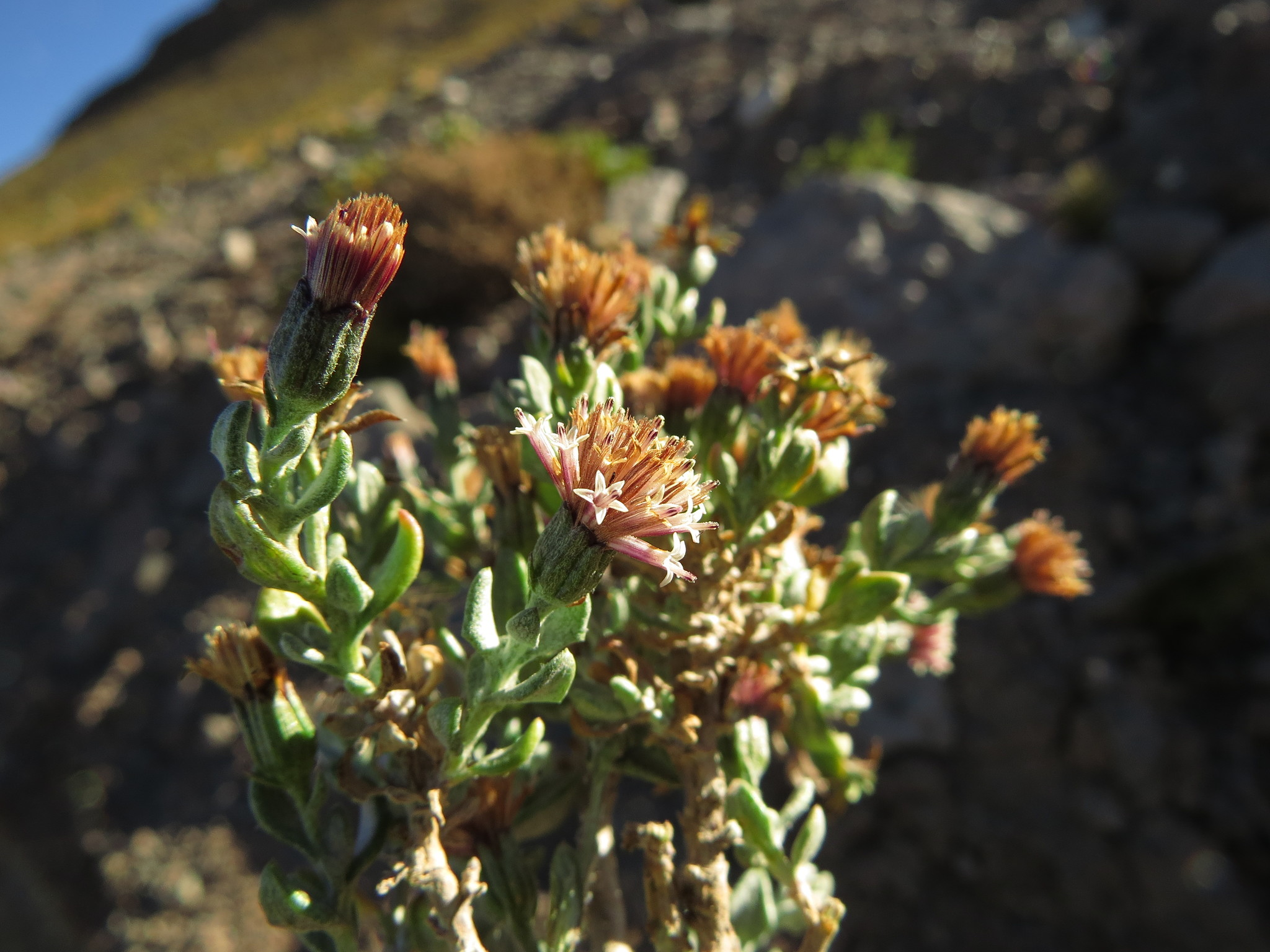
- Chersodoma candida

Scientific classification
- Kingdom: Plantae
- Clade: Embryophytes
- Clade: Tracheophytes
- Clade: Angiosperms
- Clade: Eudicots
- Clade: Asterids
- Order: Asterales
- Family: Asteraceae
- Subfamily: Asteroideae
- Tribe: Senecioneae
- Genus: Chersodoma; Phil., 1891 emend. Cabrera, 1946

Synonyms
- Senecio subg. Dioicosenecio Cabrera; Senecio sect. Diclini Cabrera; Chersodoma subg. Diclinanthus B.Nord.

= Chersodoma =

Genus of flowering plants

Chersodoma is a genus of South American flowering plants in the daisy family. Members of this genus or dioecious shrubs or subshrubs.

Species

- Chersodoma antennaria - Peru, Bolivia
- Chersodoma arequipensis - Peru, Chile
- Chersodoma argentina - northwestern Argentina
- Chersodoma candida - Peru, Bolivia, Argentina
- Chersodoma deltoidea - Peru
- Chersodoma glabriuscula - northwestern Argentina
- Chersodoma jodopappa - northwestern Argentina, northern Chile, Peru, Bolivia
- Chersodoma juanisernii - Peru
- Chersodoma ovopedata - Peru
