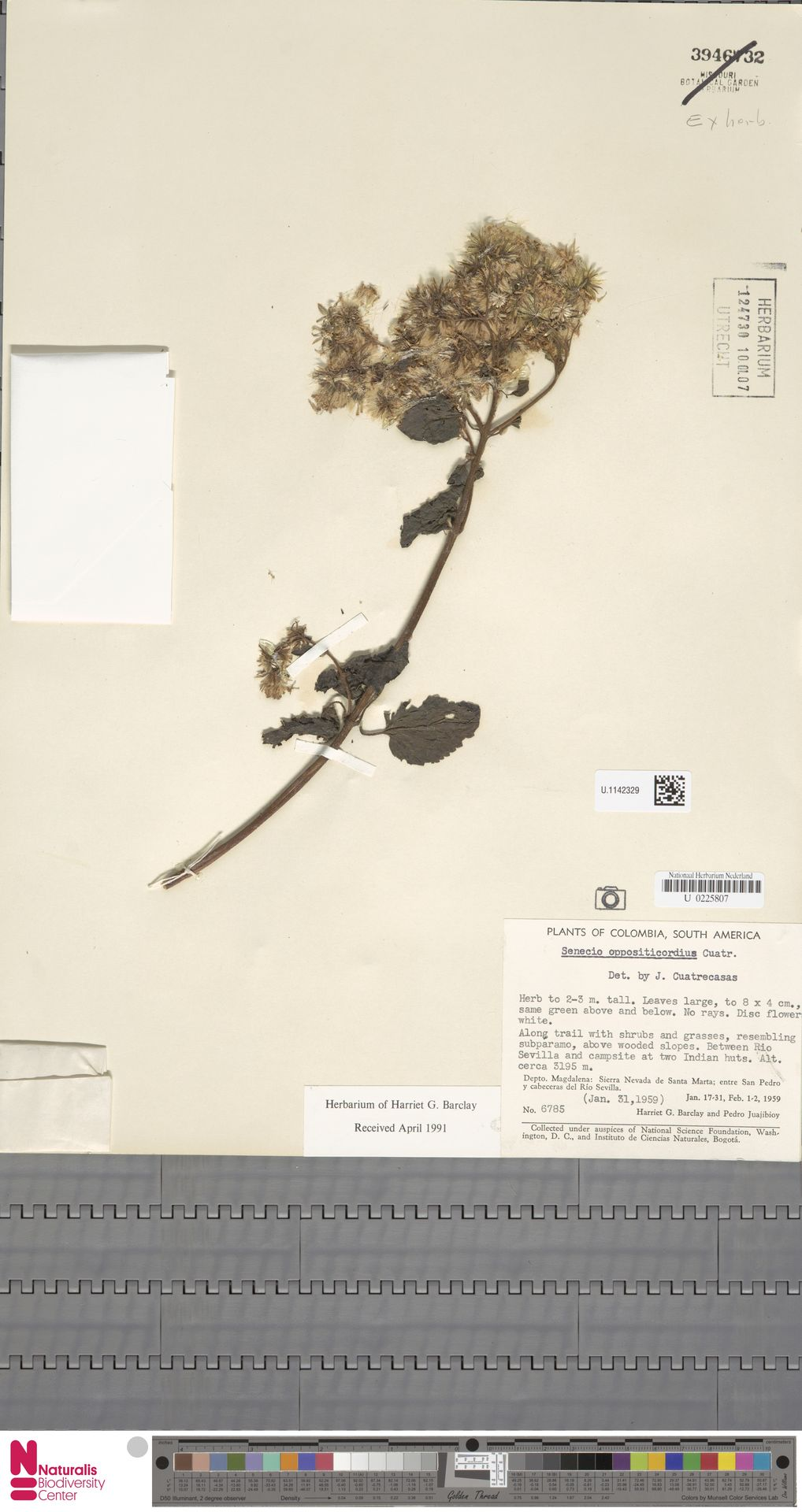
- Cabreriella oppositicordius

Scientific classification
- Kingdom: Plantae
- Clade: Embryophytes
- Clade: Tracheophytes
- Clade: Angiosperms
- Clade: Eudicots
- Clade: Asterids
- Order: Asterales
- Family: Asteraceae
- Subfamily: Asteroideae
- Tribe: Senecioneae
- Genus: Cabreriella; Cuatrec.

Type species
- Cabreriella sanctae-martae (J.M.Greenman) Cuatrec.

= Cabreriella =

Genus of flowering plants

Cabreriella is a genus of flowering plants in the aster family, Asteraceae. It is native to South America.

Species

- Cabreriella oppositicordia - Colombia, Venezuela
- Cabreriella sanctae-martae - Colombia (Cesar and Magdalena regions)
