= Mixtecalia =

Scientific classification
- Kingdom: Plantae
- Clade: Tracheophytes
- Clade: Angiosperms
- Clade: Eudicots
- Clade: Asterids
- Order: Asterales
- Family: Asteraceae
- Subfamily: Asteroideae
- Tribe: Senecioneae
- Subtribe: Tussilagininae
- Genus: Mixtecalia; Redonda-Mart., García-Mend. & D.Sandoval
- Species: M. teitaensis

Binomial name
- Mixtecalia teitaensis Redonda-Mart., García-Mend. & D.Sandoval

Genus of flowering plants

Mixtecalia is a genus of flowering plants in the family Asteraceae. It includes a single species, Mixtecalia teitaensis, which is endemic to Oaxaca in southern Mexico.

The genus and species were first described in 2020.
