= Pojarkovia =

Scientific classification
- Kingdom: Plantae
- Clade: Tracheophytes
- Clade: Angiosperms
- Clade: Eudicots
- Clade: Asterids
- Order: Asterales
- Family: Asteraceae
- Subfamily: Asteroideae
- Tribe: Senecioneae
- Genus: Pojarkovia; Askerova
- Species: P. pojarkovae

Binomial name
- Pojarkovia pojarkovae (Schischk.) Greuter

Synonyms
- Senecio pojarkovae Schischk.; Senecio stenocephalus Boiss.; Pojarkovia stenocephala (Boiss.) Askerova

Genus of plants

Pojarkovia is a genus of flowering plants in the sunflower family.

== Species ==
accepted species

- Pojarkovia pojarkovae (Schischk.) Greuter - Azerbaijan and Republic of Georgia

formerly included

- Pojarkovia macrophylla (M.Bieb.) Askerova - Synonym of Caucasalia macrophylla (M.Bieb.) B.Nord.
- Pojarkovia pauciloba (DC.) Askerova - Synonym of Iranecio paucilobus (DC.) B.Nord.
- Pojarkovia platyphylloides (Sommier & Levier) Askerova - Synonym of Caucasalia pontica (K.Koch) Greuter
