= Bafutia =

Conservation status
- Near Threatened (IUCN 2.3)

Scientific classification
- Kingdom: Plantae
- Clade: Tracheophytes
- Clade: Angiosperms
- Clade: Eudicots
- Clade: Asterids
- Order: Asterales
- Family: Asteraceae
- Subfamily: Asteroideae
- Tribe: Senecioneae
- Genus: Bafutia; C.D.Adams
- Species: B. tenuicaulis

Binomial name
- Bafutia tenuicaulis C.D.Adams

Genus of flowering plants

Bafutia tenuicaulis is a species of flowering plant in the family Asteraceae, and the only species in the genus Bafutia. It is found in Cameroon and Nigeria, where it lives in rocky areas.
