= Lamprocephalus =

Scientific classification
- Kingdom: Plantae
- Clade: Tracheophytes
- Clade: Angiosperms
- Clade: Eudicots
- Clade: Asterids
- Order: Asterales
- Family: Asteraceae
- Subfamily: Asteroideae
- Tribe: Senecioneae
- Genus: Lamprocephalus; B.Nord.
- Species: L. montanus

Binomial name
- Lamprocephalus montanus B.Nord.

Genus of flowering plants

Lamprocephalus is a genus of plants in the groundsel tribe within the sunflower family.

Species

There is only one known species, Lamprocephalus montanus, a rare endemic native to Western Cape Province in South Africa.
