= Nesampelos =

Scientific classification
- Kingdom: Plantae
- Clade: Tracheophytes
- Clade: Angiosperms
- Clade: Eudicots
- Clade: Asterids
- Order: Asterales
- Family: Asteraceae
- Subfamily: Asteroideae
- Tribe: Senecioneae
- Genus: Nesampelos; B.Nord. 2007

Type species
- Conyza lucens Poir.

Synonyms
- Nesampelos B.Nord. 2006

Genus of flowering plants

Nesampelos is a genus of flowering plants in the daisy family, native to the Island of Hispaniola in the West Indies.

Species

- Nesampelos alainii (J.Jiménez Alm.) B.Nord. - Dominican Republic
- Nesampelos hotteana (Urb. & Ekman) B.Nord. - Haiti
- Nesampelos lucens (Poir.) B.Nord. - Haiti
