= Garcibarrigoa =

Scientific classification
- Kingdom: Plantae
- Clade: Tracheophytes
- Clade: Angiosperms
- Clade: Eudicots
- Clade: Asterids
- Order: Asterales
- Family: Asteraceae
- Subfamily: Asteroideae
- Tribe: Senecioneae
- Genus: Garcibarrigoa; Cuatrec.

Type species
- Garcibarrigoa telembina (Cuatrec.) Cuatrec.

Genus of flowering plants

Garcibarrigoa is a genus of South American flowering plants in the daisy family.

Species

- Garcibarrigoa sinbundoya S.Díaz & Pedraza - Putumayo region of Colombia
- Garcibarrigoa telembina (Cuatrec.) Cuatrec. - Ecuador
