= Iranecio =

Scientific classification
- Kingdom: Plantae
- Clade: Embryophytes
- Clade: Tracheophytes
- Clade: Angiosperms
- Clade: Eudicots
- Clade: Asterids
- Order: Asterales
- Family: Asteraceae
- Subfamily: Asteroideae
- Tribe: Senecioneae
- Genus: Iranecio; B.Nord.

Genus of flowering plants

Iranecio is a genus of flowering plants in the sunflower family, native to the eastern Mediterranean east to the Caucasus.

Species

- Iranecio bulghardaghensis (Soldano) D.Heller
- Iranecio cariensis (Boiss.) C.Jeffrey
- Iranecio davisii (V.A.Matthews) C.Jeffrey
- Iranecio elbrusensis (Boiss.) B.Nord.
- Iranecio eriospermus (DC.) C.Jeffrey
- Iranecio hypochionaeus (Boiss.) C.Jeffrey
- Iranecio jurineifolius (Boiss. & Balansa) C.Jeffrey
- Iranecio kubensis (Grossh.) C.Jeffrey
- Iranecio lazicus (Boiss. & Balansa) C.Jeffrey
- Iranecio lipskyi C.Jeffrey
- Iranecio lorentii (Hochst.) C.Jeffrey
- Iranecio massagetovii (Schischk.) C.Jeffrey
- Iranecio oligolepis (Boiss.) B.Nord.
- Iranecio pandurifolius (K.Koch) C.Jeffrey
- Iranecio paucilobus (DC.) B.Nord.
- Iranecio taraxacifolius (M.Bieb.) C.Jeffrey
