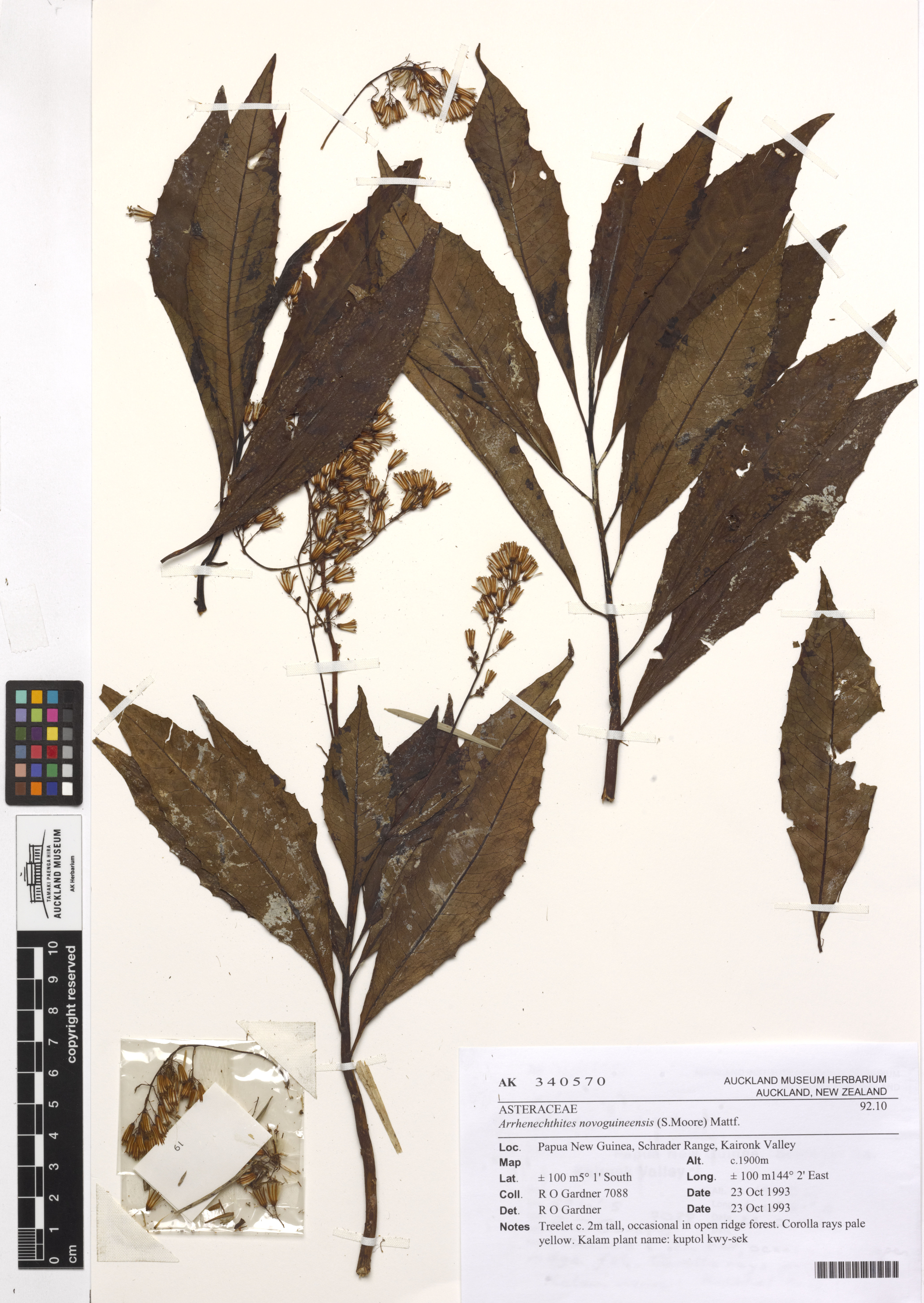
- Arrhenechthites novoguineensis

Scientific classification
- Kingdom: Plantae
- Clade: Embryophytes
- Clade: Tracheophytes
- Clade: Angiosperms
- Clade: Eudicots
- Clade: Asterids
- Order: Asterales
- Family: Asteraceae
- Subfamily: Asteroideae
- Tribe: Senecioneae
- Genus: Arrhenechthites; Mattfeld

Type species
- Arrhenechthites tomentellus Mattfeld

= Arrhenechthites =

Genus of flowering plants

Arrhenechthites is a genus of flowering plants in the daisy family.

Species

There is some disagreement over whether the genus name is masculine or feminine. Hence many of the species have two names that can be found in various publications. To help the reader find appropriate information, we provide links to both sets of names below.

- Arrhenechthites alba / Arrhenechthites albus - New Guinea
- Arrhenechthites haplogyna / Arrhenechthites haplogynus - New Guinea
- Arrhenechthites hydrangeoides - Sulawesi
- Arrhenechthites mixta / Arrhenechthites mixtus - New South Wales, Victoria
- Arrhenechthites novoguineensis - New Guinea
- Arrhenechthites tomentella / Arrhenechthites tomentellus - New Guinea
