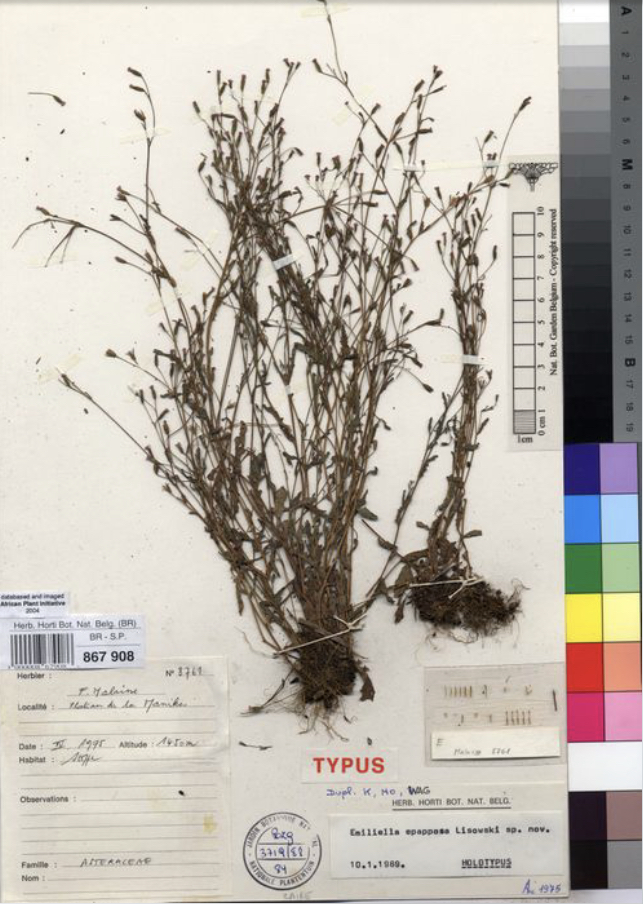
- Emiliella epapposa

Scientific classification
- Kingdom: Plantae
- Clade: Tracheophytes
- Clade: Angiosperms
- Clade: Eudicots
- Clade: Asterids
- Order: Asterales
- Family: Asteraceae
- Subfamily: Asteroideae
- Tribe: Senecioneae
- Genus: Emiliella; S.Moore

Type species
- Emiliella exigua S.Moore

= Emiliella =

Genus of flowering plants

Emiliella is a genus of African flowering plants in the daisy family.

Species

- Emiliella biensis Torre - Angola
- Emiliella drummondii Torre - Zambia
- Emiliella epapposa Lisowski - Zaire
- Emiliella exigua S.Moore - Angola
- Emiliella palhinhana Torre - Angola
- Emiliella zambiensis Torre - Zambia
