= Cissampelopsis =

Scientific classification
- Kingdom: Plantae
- Clade: Tracheophytes
- Clade: Angiosperms
- Clade: Eudicots
- Clade: Asterids
- Order: Asterales
- Family: Asteraceae
- Subfamily: Asteroideae
- Tribe: Senecioneae
- Genus: Cissampelopsis; Miq. (1856)

Type species
- Cissampelopsis volubilis (Blume) Miq.

Synonyms
- Cacalia sect. Cissampelopsis DC.; Senecio subg. Synotis C.B.Clarke; Senecio sect. Scandentes C.B.Clarke; Senecio series Scandentes (C.B.Clarke) H.Koyama; Senecio sect. Synotis Benth.; Senecio series Synotis H.Koyama

Genus of flowering plants

Cissampelopsis is a genus of flowering plants in the daisy family, native to India, China, and Southeast Asia.

== Species ==
12 species are accepted.

- Cissampelopsis ansteadii (Tadul. & Jacob) C.Jeffrey & Y.L.Chen – Tamil Nadu
- Cissampelopsis buimalia (Buch.-Ham. ex D.Don) C.Jeffrey & Y.L.Chen – Yunnan, Mizoram, Bhutan, Sikkim, Nepal
- Cissampelopsis calcadensis (Ramaswami) C.Jeffrey & Y.L.Chen – Tamil Nadu
- Cissampelopsis corifolia C.Jeffrey & Y.L.Chen – Yunnan, Tibet, Meghalaya, Sikkim, West Bengal, Assam, Myanmar
- Cissampelopsis corymbosa (Wall. ex DC.) C.Jeffrey & Y.L.Chen – Andhra Pradesh, Kerala, Madhya Pradesh, Tamil Nadu, Sri Lanka
- Cissampelopsis erythrochaeta – Hunan
- Cissampelopsis glandulosa C.Jeffrey & Y.L.Chen – Yunnan
- Cissampelopsis quinquesquamata C.Ren – Myanmar
- Cissampelopsis spelaeicola (Vaniot) C.Jeffrey & Y.L.Chen – Yunnan, Guizhou, Sichuan, Guangxi
- Cissampelopsis vivekananthanii Gopalan & Chithra – Kerala and Tamil Nadu
- Cissampelopsis volubilis (Blume) Miq. – Yunnan, Guizhou, Guangxi, Hainan, Assam, Manipur, Meghalaya, India, Myanmar, Thailand, Peninsular Malaysia, Sumatra
- Cissampelopsis walkeri (Arn.) C.Jeffrey & Y.L.Chen – Kerala, Tamil Nadu, Sri Lanka
