= Zemisia =

Scientific classification
- Kingdom: Plantae
- Clade: Tracheophytes
- Clade: Angiosperms
- Clade: Eudicots
- Clade: Asterids
- Order: Asterales
- Family: Asteraceae
- Subfamily: Asteroideae
- Tribe: Senecioneae
- Genus: Zemisia; B.Nord.

Genus of flowering plants

Zemisia is a genus of flowering plants belonging to the family Asteraceae. The genus was circumscribed by Rune Bertil Nordenstam in Compositae News Lett. vol.44 on page 72 in 2006.

It is native to southern Mexico, El Salvador, Guatemala, Honduras and Jamaica.

The genus name of Zemisia is in reference to Zemi, a deity or ancestral spirit, and a sculptural object housing the spirit, among the Taíno people of the Caribbean.

Species:

- Zemisia discolor (Sw.) B.Nord.
- Zemisia thomasii (Klatt) Pruski
