= Synotis =

Scientific classification
- Kingdom: Plantae
- Clade: Tracheophytes
- Clade: Angiosperms
- Clade: Eudicots
- Clade: Asterids
- Order: Asterales
- Family: Asteraceae
- Subfamily: Asteroideae
- Tribe: Senecioneae
- Genus: Synotis (C.B.Clarke) C.Jeffrey & Y.L.Chen

Type species
- Synotis wallichii (DC.) C.Jeffrey & Y.L.Chen

Synonyms
- Senecio subgen. Synotis C.B.Clarke

Genus of plants

Synotis is a genus of Asian plants in the groundsel tribe within the daisy family. The species occur mostly in the Himalayan region of southwestern China and the northern Indian subcontinent, but a few are native to northern China.

Species

- Synotis acuminata
- Synotis ainsliifolia
- Synotis alata
- Synotis atractylidifolia
- Synotis auriculata
- Synotis austroyunnanensis
- Synotis bhot
- Synotis birmanica
- Synotis borii
- Synotis brevipappa
- Synotis calocephala
- Synotis cappa
- Synotis cavaleriei
- Synotis changiana
- Synotis cordifolia
- Synotis damiaoshanica
- Synotis duclouxii
- Synotis erythropappa
- Synotis fulvipes
- Synotis glomerata
- Synotis guizhouensis
- Synotis hieraciifolia
- Synotis ionodasys
- Synotis jowaiensis
- Synotis kunthiana
- Synotis longipes
- Synotis lucorum
- Synotis lushaensis
- Synotis muliensis
- Synotis nagensium
- Synotis nayongensis
- Synotis otophylla
- Synotis palmatisecta
- Synotis pseudoalata
- Synotis reniformis
- Synotis rufinervis
- Synotis saluenensis
- Synotis sciatrephes
- Synotis setchuanensis
- Synotis simonsii
- Synotis sinica
- Synotis solidaginea
- Synotis tetrantha
- Synotis triligulata
- Synotis vagans
- Synotis vaniotii
- Synotis wallichii
- Synotis xantholeuca
- Synotis yakoensis
- Synotis yui

formerly included

see Senecio

- Synotis rhabdos - Senecio rhabdos
