= Iocenes =

Scientific classification
- Kingdom: Plantae
- Clade: Tracheophytes
- Clade: Angiosperms
- Clade: Eudicots
- Clade: Asterids
- Order: Asterales
- Family: Asteraceae
- Subfamily: Asteroideae
- Tribe: Senecioneae
- Genus: Iocenes; B.Nord.
- Species: I. virens

Binomial name
- Iocenes virens (Phil.) Pruski

Synonyms
- Senecio acanthifolius Hombr. & Jacquinot nom. illeg.; Senecio acanthifolius subsp. virens (Phil.) Cabrera & Zardini; Senecio ombrophyllus Skottsb.; Senecio virens Phil. (1894) (basionym)

Genus of flowering plants

Iocenes is a genus of flowering plants in the daisy family.

There is only one known species, Iocenes virens, native to extreme southern South America (Tierra del Fuego Province in Argentina and Magallanes Region in Chile).
