= Caucasalia =

- Senecio platyphyllus (now Caucasalia macrophylla)

Scientific classification
- Kingdom: Plantae
- Clade: Tracheophytes
- Clade: Angiosperms
- Clade: Eudicots
- Clade: Asterids
- Order: Asterales
- Family: Asteraceae
- Subfamily: Asteroideae
- Tribe: Senecioneae
- Genus: Caucasalia; B.Nord., 1997

Genus of flowering plants

Caucasalia is a genus of flowering plants in the daisy family. It includes three species native to Turkey and the Caucasus.

== Species ==
Three species are accepted.

- Caucasalia macrophylla (M.Bieb.) B.Nord. – Turkey, Caucasus
- Caucasalia pontica (K.Koch) Greuter – Georgia
- Caucasalia similiflora (Kolak.) B.Nord. – Georgia

=== Formerly placed here ===
- Kazbegia parviflora (M.Bieb.) Uysal & Hamzaoğlu (as Caucasalia parviflora (M.Bieb.) B.Nord.)
