= Lagenocypsela =

Scientific classification
- Kingdom: Plantae
- Clade: Tracheophytes
- Clade: Angiosperms
- Clade: Eudicots
- Clade: Asterids
- Order: Asterales
- Family: Asteraceae
- Subfamily: Asteroideae
- Tribe: Astereae
- Subtribe: Lagenophorinae
- Genus: Lagenocypsela; Swenson & K.Bremer

Genus of flowering plants

Lagenocypsela is a genus of New Guinean flowering plants in the family Asteraceae.

Species

- Lagenocypsela latifolia (Mattf.) Swenson & K.Bremer - New Guinea
- Lagenocypsela papuana (J.Kost.) Swenson & K.Bremer - New Guinea
