= Paracalia =

Scientific classification
- Kingdom: Plantae
- Clade: Tracheophytes
- Clade: Angiosperms
- Clade: Eudicots
- Clade: Asterids
- Order: Asterales
- Family: Asteraceae
- Subfamily: Asteroideae
- Tribe: Senecioneae
- Genus: Paracalia; Cuatrec.

Genus of flowering plants

Paracalia is a genus of South American flowering plants in the groundsel tribe within the sunflower family.

Species

- Paracalia jungioides (Hook. & Arn.) Cuatrec. - Peru
- Paracalia lopezii (M.O.Dillon & Sagást.) A.Correa - Peru
- Paracalia pentamera (Cuatrec.) Cuatrec. - Bolivia
