= Humbertacalia =

Scientific classification
- Kingdom: Plantae
- Clade: Tracheophytes
- Clade: Angiosperms
- Clade: Eudicots
- Clade: Asterids
- Order: Asterales
- Family: Asteraceae
- Genus: Humbertacalia; C.Jeffrey (1992)

species
- 12; see text

Genus of flowering plants

Humbertacalia is a genus of plants in the sunflower family, Asteraceae. It includes 12 species native to Madagascar (12 species) and Réunion (one species) in the western Indian Ocean.

== Species ==
12 species are accepted.

- Humbertacalia abbreviata (Humbert) Rabarim., Callm. & J.Calvo – Madagascar
- Humbertacalia amplexifolia (Humbert) C.Jeffrey – Madagascar
- Humbertacalia apocynifolia (Baker) Rabarim., Callm. & J.Calvo – Madagascar
- Humbertacalia coursii (Humbert) C.Jeffrey – Madagascar
- Humbertacalia diffusa (Humbert) J.Calvo, Rabarim. & Callm. – Madagascar
- Humbertacalia leucopappa (DC.) Pruski – Madagascar
- Humbertacalia madagascarensis Y.L.Peng & Li Bing Zhang – Madagascar
- Humbertacalia neoalleizettei (Humbert) C.Jeffrey – Madagascar
- Humbertacalia pyrifolia (DC.) C.Jeffrey – Madagascar
- Humbertacalia racemosa (DC.) C.Jeffrey – Madagascar
- Humbertacalia tomentosa (Lam.) C.Jeffrey – Madagascar and Réunion
- Humbertacalia voluta (Baker) C.Jeffrey – Madagascar
