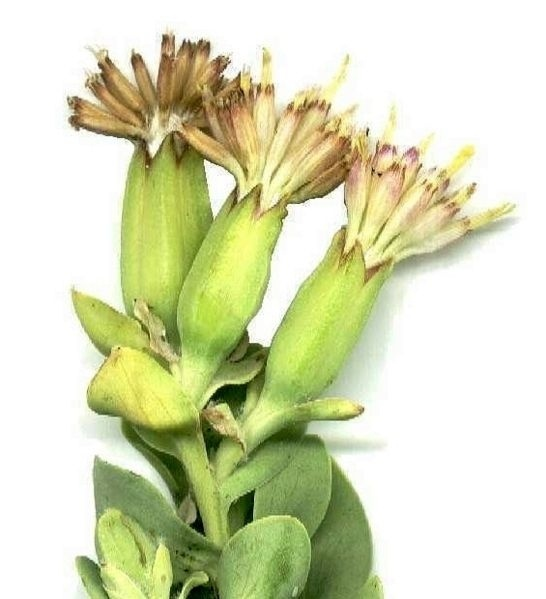
- Lopholaena coriifolia

Scientific classification
- Kingdom: Plantae
- Clade: Tracheophytes
- Clade: Angiosperms
- Clade: Eudicots
- Clade: Asterids
- Order: Asterales
- Family: Asteraceae
- Subfamily: Asteroideae
- Tribe: Senecioneae; Cass.

Genera
- See text

= Senecioneae =

Tribe of flowering plants in the family Asteraceae

Senecioneae is the largest tribe of the Asteraceae, or the sunflower family, comprising over 150 genera and over 3,500 species. Almost one-third of the species in this tribe are placed in the genus Senecio. Its members exhibit probably the widest possible range of form to be found in the entire plant kingdom, and include annuals, minute creeping alpines, herbaceous and evergreen perennials, shrubs, climbers, succulents, trees, and semi-aquatic plants.

Plants in this tribe are responsible for more livestock poisonings than all other plants combined. Its members usually contain liver and kidney toxic and carcinogenic unsaturated pyrrolizidine alkaloids in Senecio and furanoeremophilanes in Tetradymia.

A number of species are well known in horticulture.

== Classification ==
Since the time of Bentham, the "premier systematic botanist of the nineteenth century", considerable efforts have been made to classify and understand the striking morphological diversity in the Senecioneae. The traditional view of the tribe has been that of one huge genus Senecio plus many other genera which exhibit varying degrees of distinctiveness. Circumscription and delimitation of the tribe have experienced expansions and contractions over the decades as genera and groups of genera have been moved in and out, as was the case for Arnica, Liabum, Munnozia, Schistocarpha, etc. which have since then been excluded. Of the several potential causes for this constant redefinition the greatest is probably that little is known about its intergeneric relationships or a lack of phylogenetic understanding enhanced by the other problems of conflicting clues from morphological characters, the large size of the tribe, the absence of a precise delimitation or circumscription of Senecio and the naturalness of these assemblages combined with the imprecise boundaries of the different species themselves.

Many segregate genera have been recognized in recent studies, often with circumscriptions derived from selected representative species. Whether the recognition of numerous segregate genera provides a better taxonomy than treating the variation patterns as infrageneric taxa is yet unclear. A respectable case can be made for maintaining Senecio as a broad concept, at least until revisionary studies at the species level are carried out and the results subjected to critical analyses. Most genera that have been removed from the Senecioneae in the broadest sense have come to rest within the Liabeae or within a broadly circumscribed Heliantheae (e.g., allies in the Arnicinae, Chaenactidinae, or Madiinae; Haploesthes in the Flaveriinae; and Raillardella and allies in the Madiinae). Additional information may be found in B. G. Baldwin et al. (2002), H. Robinson (1981), B. Nordenstam (1977–1978) and K. Bremer (1994).

== Genera ==
Senecioneae genera recognized by the Global Compositae Database as of October 2022:

- Abrotanella Cass. (synonym Trineuron Hook.f.)
- Acrisione
- Adenostyles
- Aequatorium
- Aetheolaena
- Angeldiazia
- Antillanthus
- Arbelaezaster
- Arnoglossum
- Arrhenechthites
- Austrosynotis
- Bafutia
- Barkleyanthus
- Bedfordia
- Bethencourtia
- Blennosperma
- Bolandia
- Brachionostylum
- Brachyglottis
- Cabreriella
- Cacaliopsis
- Cadiscus
- Capelio
- Caucasalia
- Caxamarca
- Centropappus
- Chaetacalia
- Charadranaetes
- Chersodoma
- Cineraria
- Cissampelopsis
- Crassocephalum
- Cremanthodium
- Crocidium
- Culcitium
- Curio
- Dauresia
- Delairea
- Dendrocacalia
- Dendrophorbium
- Dendrosenecio
- Dicercoclados
- Digitacalia
- Dolichoglottis
- Dolichorrhiza
- Dorobaea
- Doronicum
- Dresslerothamnus
- Ekmaniopappus
- Elekmania
- Emilia
- Emiliella
- Endocellion
- Erechtites
- Eriothrix
- Euryops
- Farfugium
- Faujasia
- Faujasiopsis
- Garcibarrigoa
- Graphistylis
- Gymnodiscus
- Gynoxys
- Gynura
- Haastia
- Haplosticha
- Hasteola
- Herodotia
- Herreranthus
- Hertia
- Hoehnephytum
- Homogyne
- Hubertia
- Humbertacalia
- Ignurbia
- Io
- Iocenes
- Iranecio
- Ischnea
- Jacmaia
- Jacobaea
- Jessea
- Kleinia
- Lachanodes
- Lasiocephalus
- Lamprocephalus
- Leonis
- Lepidospartum
- Ligularia
- Ligulariopsis
- Lopholaena
- Lordhowea
- Luina
- Lundinia
- Mattfeldia
- Mesogramma
- Mikaniopsis
- Miricacalia
- Misbrookea
- Mixtecalia
- Monticalia
- Nelsonianthus
- Nemosenecio
- Nesampelos
- Nordenstamia
- Odontocline
- Oldfeltia
- Oligothrix
- Oresbia
- Othonna
- Packera
- Papuacalia
- Paracalia
- Parafaujasia
- Paragynoxys
- Parasenecio
- Pentacalia
- Pericallis
- Petasites
- Phaneroglossa
- Pippenalia
- Pittocaulon
- Pladaroxylon
- Pojarkovia
- Psacaliopsis
- Psacalium Cass. (synonym Mesoneuris A.Gray)
- Psednotrichia
- Pseudogynoxys
- Rainiera
- Robinsonecio
- Robinsonia
- Roldana
- Rugelia
- Scapisenecio
- Scrobicaria
- Senecio L. (synonym Pseudojacobaea (Hook.f.) R.Mathur)
- Shafera
- Sinacalia
- Sinosenecio
- Solanecio
- Steirodiscus
- Stenops
- Stilpnogyne
- Syneilesis
- Synotis
- Talamancalia
- Telanthophora
- Tephroseris
- Tetradymia
- Traversia
- Tussilago
- Urostemon
- Vickifunkia C.Ren, L.Wang, I.D.Illar. & Q.E.Yang
- Villasenoria
- Werneria
- Xenophyllum
- Yermo
- Zemisia
