= Mesogramma apiifolium =

Scientific classification
- Kingdom: Plantae
- Clade: Tracheophytes
- Clade: Angiosperms
- Clade: Eudicots
- Clade: Asterids
- Order: Asterales
- Family: Asteraceae
- Subfamily: Asteroideae
- Tribe: Senecioneae
- Genus: Mesogramma; DC.
- Species: M. apiifolium

Binomial name
- Mesogramma apiifolium DC.

Species of plant

Mesogramma is a genus of flowering plants belonging to the family Asteraceae. It contains a single species, Mesogramma apiifolium.

Its native range is Southern Tropical and Southern Africa.
