= Psednotrichia =

Scientific classification
- Kingdom: Plantae
- Clade: Tracheophytes
- Clade: Angiosperms
- Clade: Eudicots
- Clade: Asterids
- Order: Asterales
- Family: Asteraceae
- Subfamily: Asteroideae
- Tribe: Senecioneae
- Genus: Psednotrichia; Hiern

Synonyms
- Xyridopsis B.Nord.

Genus of plants

Psednotrichia is a genus of Angolan flowering plants in the groundsel tribe within the sunflower family.

Species

- Psednotrichia newtonii (O.Hoffm.) Anderb. & P.O.Karis
- Psednotrichia perennis N.G.Bergh & B Nord.
- Psednotrichia xyridopsis (O.Hoffm.) Anderb. & P.O.Karis

formerly included

Psednotrichia australis Alston - Felicia australis (Alston) E.Phillips
