= Wapiti River (New Zealand) =

- Route of the Wapiti River
- Mouth of the Wapiti River Wapiti River (New Zealand) (South Island)

Location
- Country: New Zealand

Physical characteristics
- Source
  - location: Stuart Mountains
  - coordinates: 44°58′11″S 167°34′21″E
  - elevation: 1,280 m (4,200 ft)
- Mouth
  - location: Lake Te Anau
  - coordinates: 45°05′39″S 167°34′31″E
  - elevation: 210 m (690 ft)

Basin features
- Progression: Wapiti River → North West Arm → Lake Te Anau → Waiau River → Foveaux Strait
- Tributaries
  - left: Canyon Creek
  - right: Rugged Burn, Barrier Stream

The Wapiti River is a river in the Southland Region of New Zealand. It rises in the northern extremity of the Stuart Mountains in Fiordland National Park, the top of its watershed being part of the main divide. Two branches feed Lake Sutherland, (elevation 470 metres (1,540 ft)) the outflow of which flows southwest to Lake Thomson. A further 2.2 kilometres (1.4 mi) reach of the river heads east to Lake Hankinson, which is separated from the North West Arm of the Middle Fiord of Lake Te Anau by a final 0.6-kilometre (0.4 mi) stretch of the river.

The river is named for the Wapiti (Cervus canadensis), an introduced deer species found in Fiordland. Lake Wapiti lies a few kilometres from the Wapiti River, but is in a separate catchment, that of the Doon River feeding the West Arm of the Middle Fiord. A tramping track connecting Lake Te Anau to George Sound via the Henry Pass follows the Wapiti River from its mouth as far as the head of Lake Thomson, thereafter turning west up a tributary named Rugged Burn.

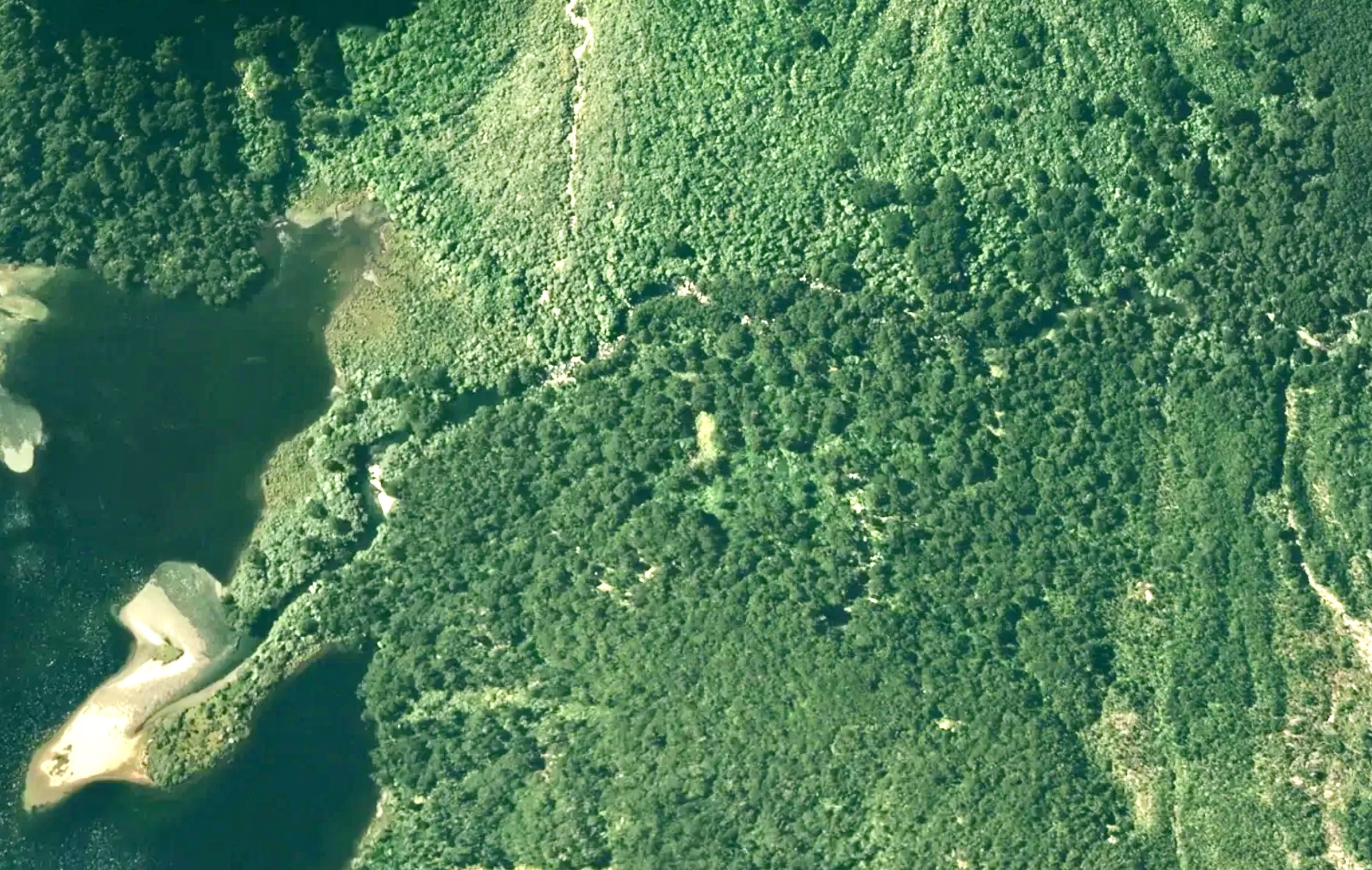
Wapiti River delta, Lake Sutherland

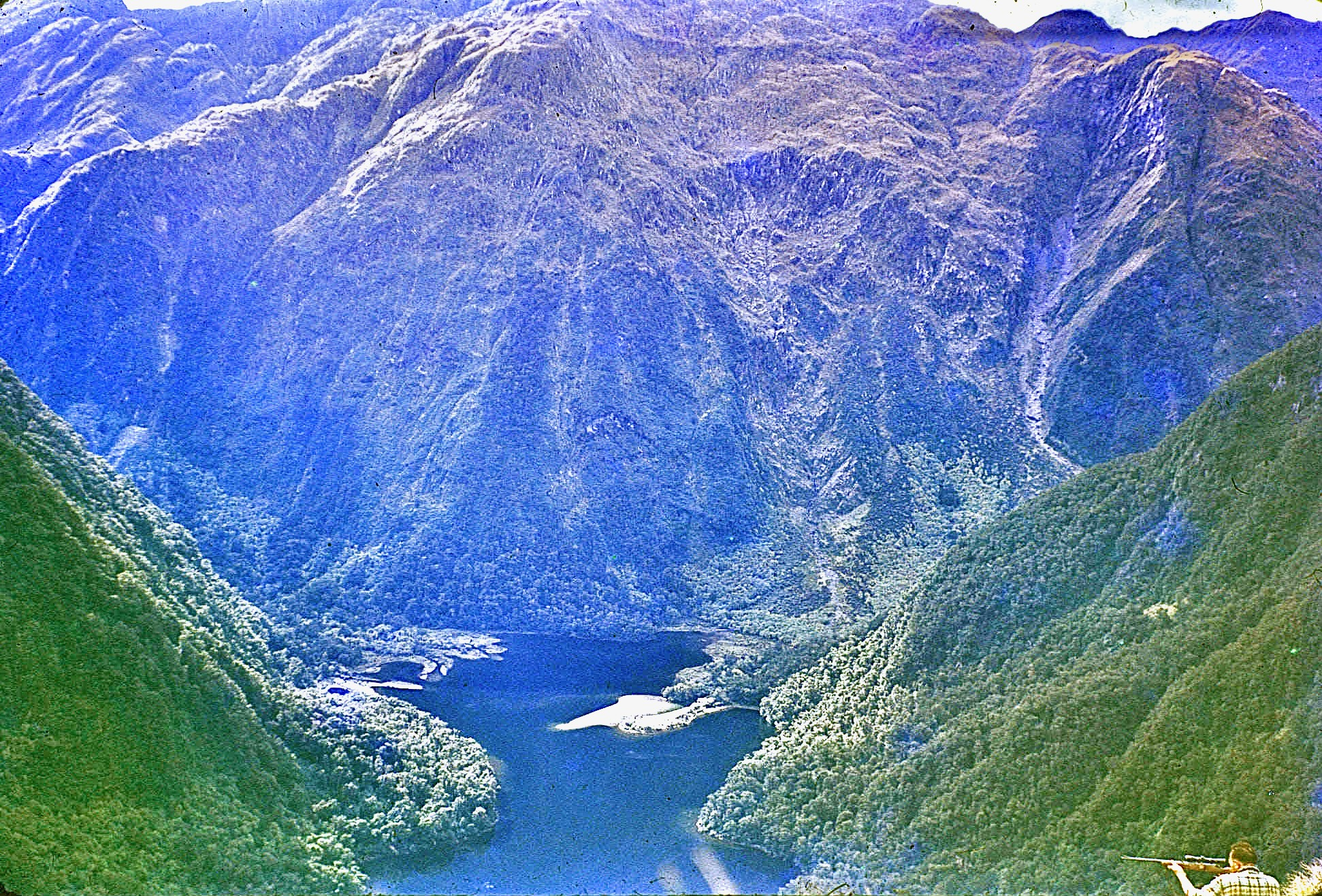
Lake Sutherland and Wapiti delta

== Vegetation ==
The silver beech (tirowhārangi) forest grows up to about 830 m (2,720 ft). In it pepper tree (mountain horopito), broadleaf (kāpuka), fuchsia (kōtukutuku), coprosma (karamū), soft tree-fern, ribbonwood (mākaka), wine berry (makmako) and crown fern (piupiu) are common. Above the tree line, bog pine, hebe, dracophyllum (neinei) and tussock (wī) are common. In 2013, in an alpine monitoring plot above Lake Sutherland, 85 species were found, including Abrotanella linearis, Abrotanella rostrata, Aciphylla congesta (cushion speargrass), Aciphylla multisecta (small speargrass), Aciphylla takahea (large speargrass), Celmisia bonplandii (New Zealand aster, tikumu), Celmisia holosericea, Gentianella grisebachii, Lobelia gaberrima, Ourisia remotifolia (mountain foxglove), Ranunculus sericophyllus (silky alpine buttercup) and Astelia petriei.
