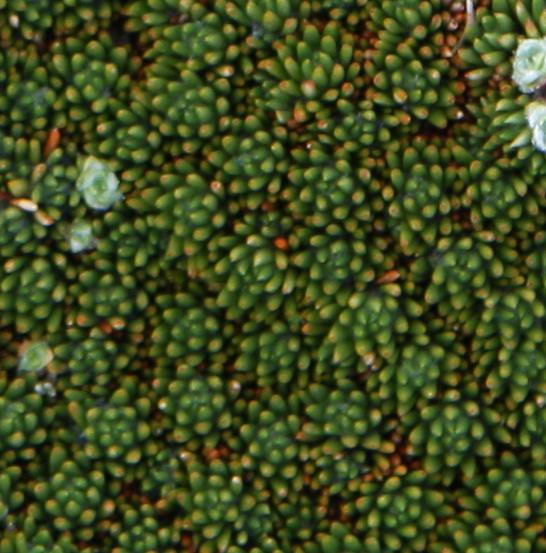
- Abrotanella forsteroides

Scientific classification
- Kingdom: Plantae
- Clade: Tracheophytes
- Clade: Angiosperms
- Clade: Eudicots
- Clade: Asterids
- Order: Asterales
- Family: Asteraceae
- Subfamily: Asteroideae
- Tribe: Senecioneae
- Genus: Abrotanella; Cass.

Synonyms
- Ceratella Hook.f.; Scleroleima Hook.f.; Trineuron Hook.f.

= Abrotanella =

Genus of flowering plants

Abrotanella is a genus of flowering plants in the family Asteraceae. It includes 22 species which are native to Australia, New Guinea, New Zealand, and southern South America.

They are usually small plants, sometimes not reaching more than a few millimetres above the ground, although some form cushions in bolster heaths reaching up to a metre in diameter.

== Taxonomy ==
Genus Abrotanella is placed in the tribe Senecioneae and is the sole genus in the subtribe Abrotanellinae. The genus was formerly placed in the subtribe Blennospermatinae, but molecular and morphological studies have shown it to be distinct from other genera in that group.

Phylogenetic studies have shown that Abrotanella forms a well-supported monophyletic group. It is sister to a clade formed by three other genera: Crocidium, Blennosperma, and Ischnea. Within Abrotanella, A. forsteroides from Tasmania is sister to all other species in the genus.

== Evolutionary history ==
The evolutionary history of Abrotanella has been investigated using molecular dating techniques, providing insights into the timing of its diversification. According to these studies, the stem age of Abrotanella is estimated to be approximately 19.4 million years ago, placing its origin in the early Miocene. However, the radiation of extant species began much later, around 4.2 million years ago during the Pliocene. This was followed by a significant divergence event about 3.1 million years ago, which led to the formation of the two main lineages observed within the genus.

Biogeographic analyses suggest that South America was likely part of the ancestral area for Abrotanella. The genus is thought to have reached New Zealand and other Pacific areas through long-distance dispersal, as the timing of its evolution postdates the separation of these landmasses. This finding challenges earlier hypotheses that might have attributed the distribution of Abrotanella to ancient vicariance events related to the break-up of Gondwana.

The distribution of Abrotanella species reflects a complex history involving both vicariance and dispersal events. Researchers have proposed that this distribution pattern may have resulted from a combination of factors, including potential migration via land bridges or stepping stones along the Antarctic coast, as well as long-distance dispersal across ocean barriers.

== Description ==
Abrotanella comprises small alpine or subalpine plants, often forming cushions. They are typically found growing in moist habitats, herbfields, among rocks, or on bare soils.

Most species of Abrotanella lack obvious adaptations for long-distance dispersal. However, some species, such as A. submarginata and A. muscosa, have fruits with twin hairs and an apical crown, which could potentially aid in dispersal.

== Species ==
22 species are accepted.

- Abrotanella caespitosa Petrie ex Kirk – New Zealand
- Abrotanella diemii Cabrera – Argentina
- Abrotanella emarginata (Gaudich.) Cass. – Chile, Argentina, Falkland Islands
- Abrotanella fertilis Swenson – New Zealand
- Abrotanella filiformis Petrie – New Zealand (Stewart Islands)
- Abrotanella forsteroides (Hook.f.) Benth. – New Zealand, Tasmania
- Abrotanella inconspicua Hook.f. – New Zealand
- Abrotanella linearifolia A.Gray (synonyms A. crassipes Skottsb. and A. moseleyi Skottsb.) – Tierra del Fuego
- Abrotanella linearis Bergg. – New Zealand
- Abrotanella muscosa Kirk – New Zealand
- Abrotanella nivigena (F.Muell.) F.Muell. ex Benth. – Australia
- Abrotanella papuana S.Moore – New Guinea
- Abrotanella patearoa Heads – New Zealand
- Abrotanella purpurea Swenson – Chile
- Abrotanella pusilla (Hook.f.) Hook.f. – New Zealand
- Abrotanella rostrata Swenson – New Zealand
- Abrotanella rosulata (Hook.f.f) Hook.f. – Campbell Islands
- Abrotanella scapigera (F.Muell.) F.Muell. ex Benth. – Tasmania
- Abrotanella spathulata (Hook.f.) Hook.f. – Auckland Islands
- Abrotanella submarginata A.Gray – Argentina, Chile
- Abrotanella trichoachaenia Cabrera – Argentina, Chile
- Abrotanella trilobata Swenson – Tierra del Fuego

Formerly placed here

- Rhamphogyne rhynchocarpa (Balf.f.) S.Moore, as Abrotanella rhynchocarpa Balf.f.

== Bibliography ==
- Cassini, Alexandre Henri Gabriel de (1825). Dictionnaire des Sciences Naturelles, dans lequel on traite méthodiquement des différens êtres de la nature, considérés soit en eux-mêmes, d'aprés l'état actuel de nos connoissances, soit relativement à l'utilité quén peuvent retirer la médecine, l'agriculture, le commerce et les arts (in French). Vol. 36 (2 ed.). Strasbourg and Paris: F.G. Levrault and Le Normant.
- Hooker, Joseph Dalton; Fitch, Walter Hood; Reeve Brothers (1844). The botany of the Antarctic voyage of H.M. discovery ships Erebus and Terror in the Years 1839-1843 :under the command of Captain Sir James Clark Ross. Vol. 1. London: Reeve Brothers.
- Swenson U. 1995. Systematics of Abrotanella, an amphi-Pacific genus of Asteraceae (Senecioneae). Pl. Syst. Evol. 197. (1-4): 149–193.
- Wagstaff, Steven J.; Breitwieser, Ilse & Swenson, Ulf 2006. Origin and relationships of the austral genus Abrotanella (Asteraceae) inferred from DNA sequences. Taxon 55(1):95-106.
