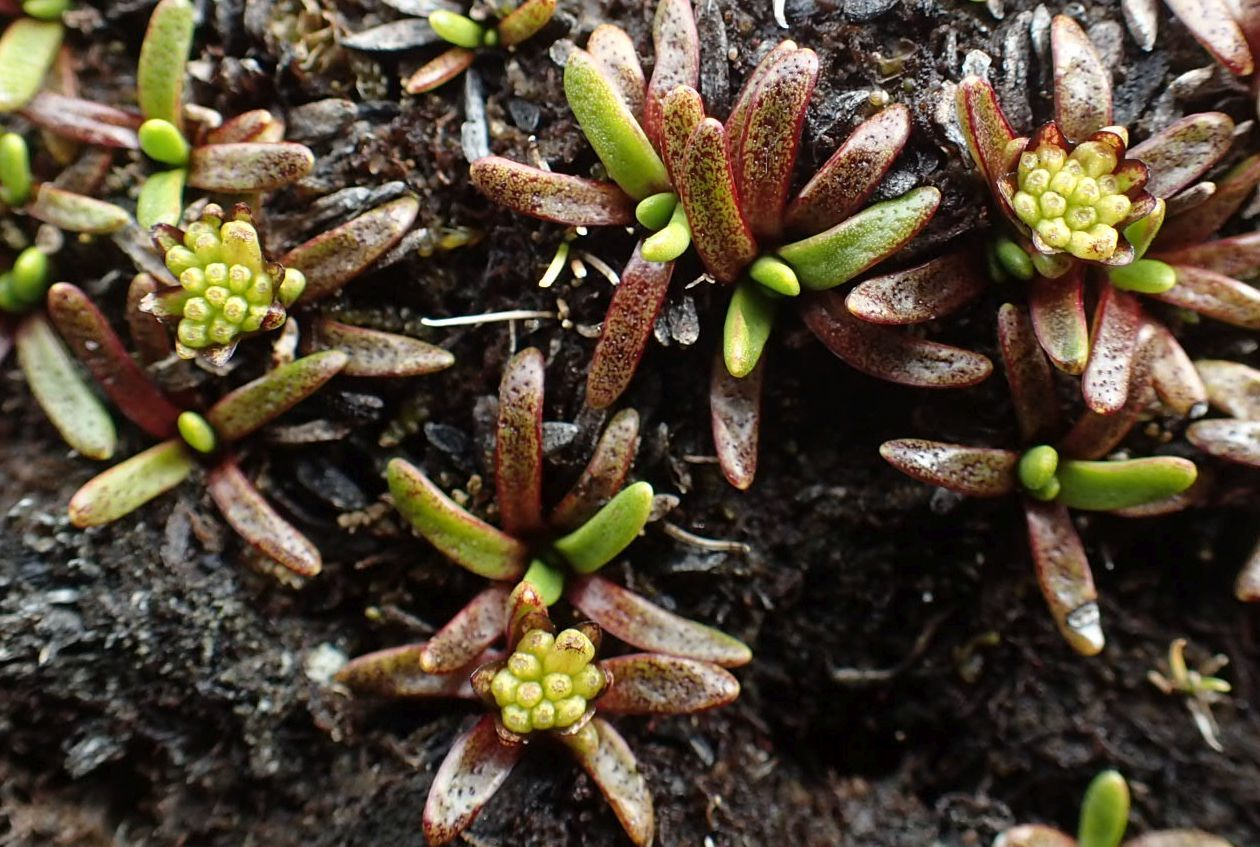

Scientific classification
- Kingdom: Plantae
- Clade: Tracheophytes
- Clade: Angiosperms
- Clade: Eudicots
- Clade: Asterids
- Order: Asterales
- Family: Asteraceae
- Genus: Abrotanella
- Species: A. caespitosa

Binomial name
- Abrotanella caespitosa Petrie ex Kirk

= Abrotanella caespitosa =

Species of plant

Abrotanella caespitosa is a member of the daisy family and is an endemic species of New Zealand.

== Description ==
Abrotanella caespitosa forms a loose cushion habit with runners that have distant scale leaves. It has narrower leaves compared to its close relatives and lacks a waxy bloom on its leaves.

== Distribution and habitat ==
The species is found in the South Island and southern North Island of New Zealand. It grows in alpine herbfield habitats.

== Taxonomy and evolution ==
Abrotanella caespitosa is closely related to A. inconspicua, A. nivigena (from Australia), and A. patearoa. These four species form a well-supported clade and have almost identical DNA sequences, suggesting they diverged within the last 500,000 years. Abrotanella caespitosa is part of a radiation of Abrotanella species that occurred during the Pliocene and Pleistocene, associated with mountain building and glaciation episodes.

== Gallery ==
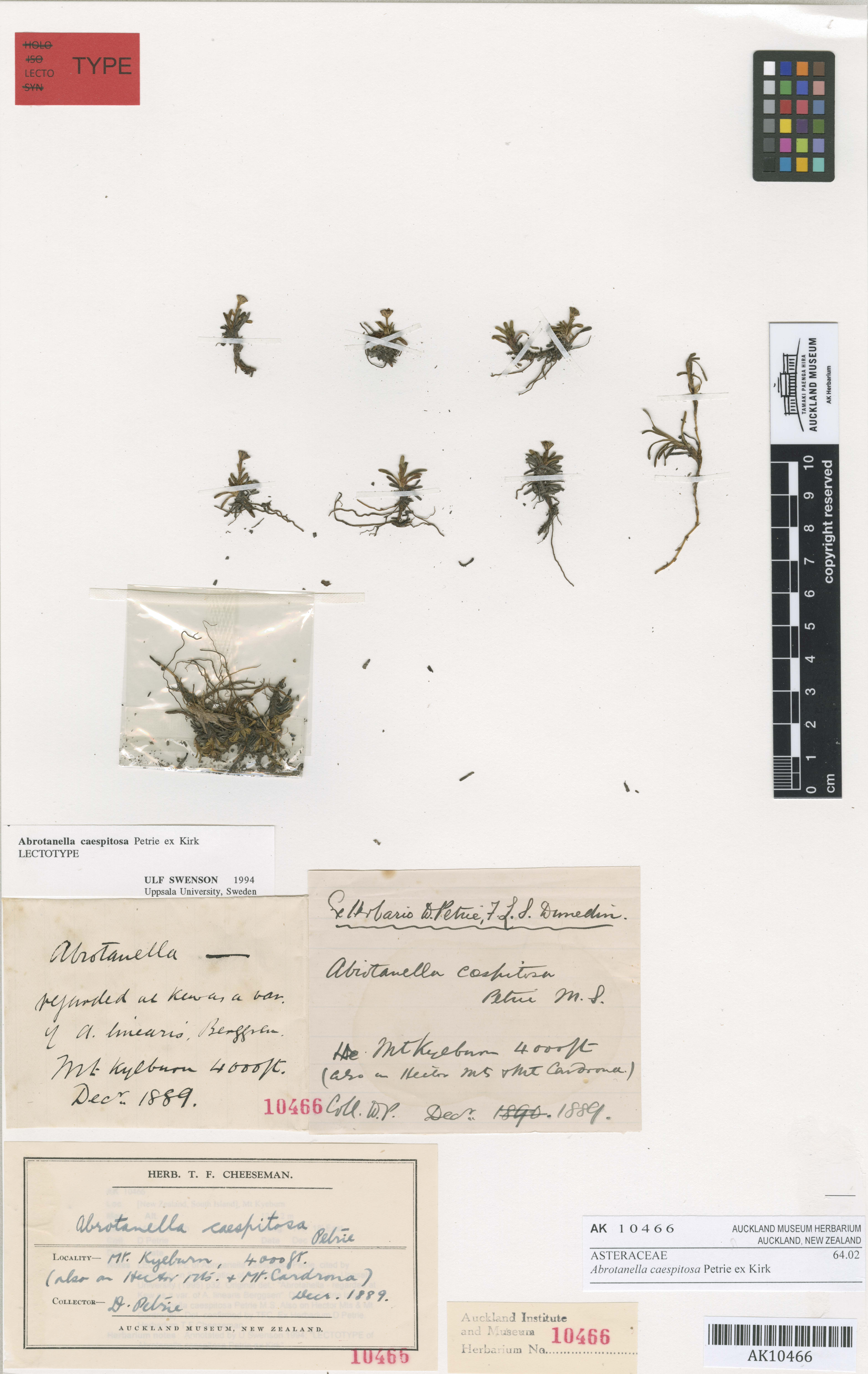
Herbarium specimen from the Auckland War Memorial Museum

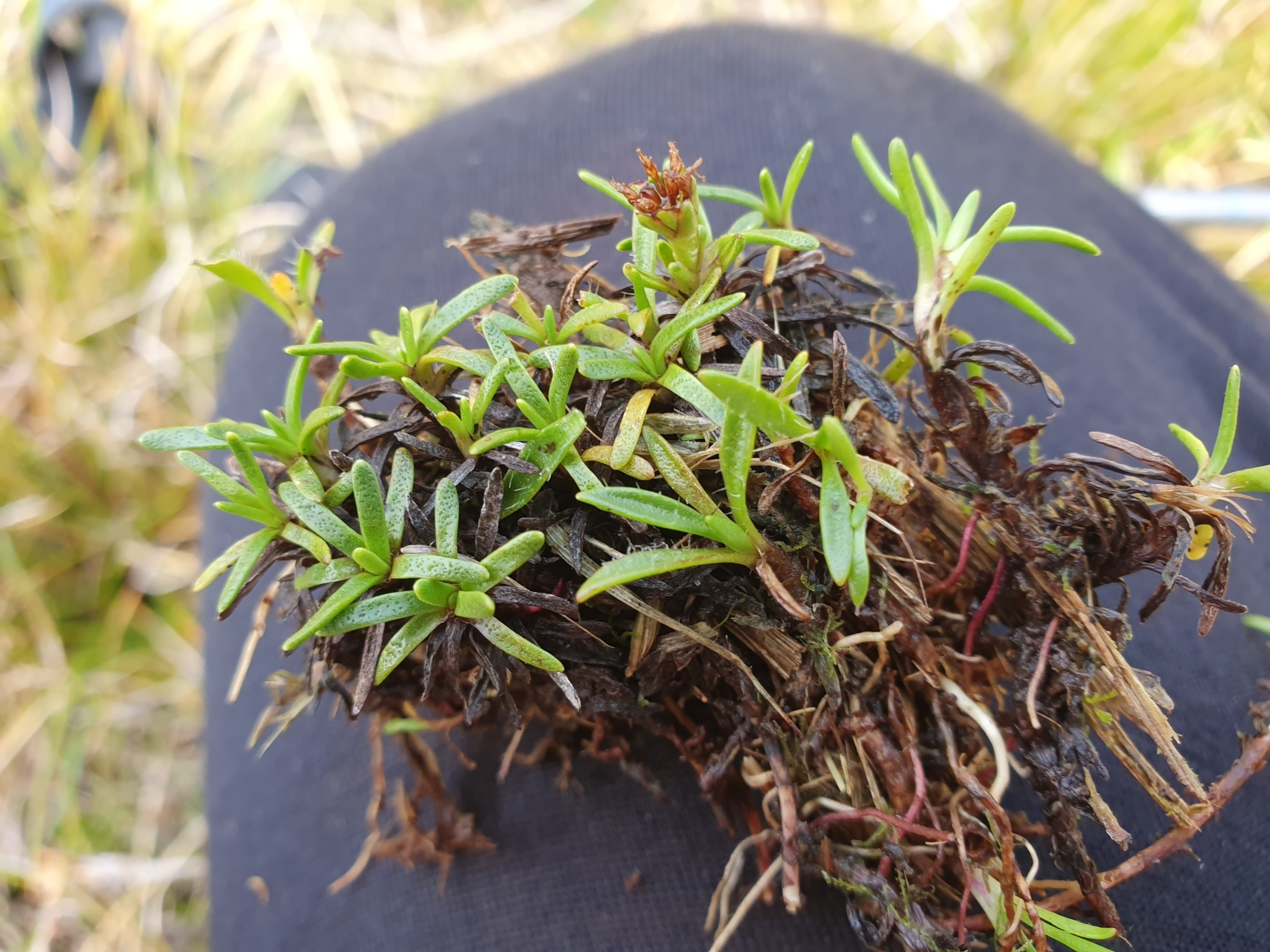
Close-up and root system of A. caespitosa

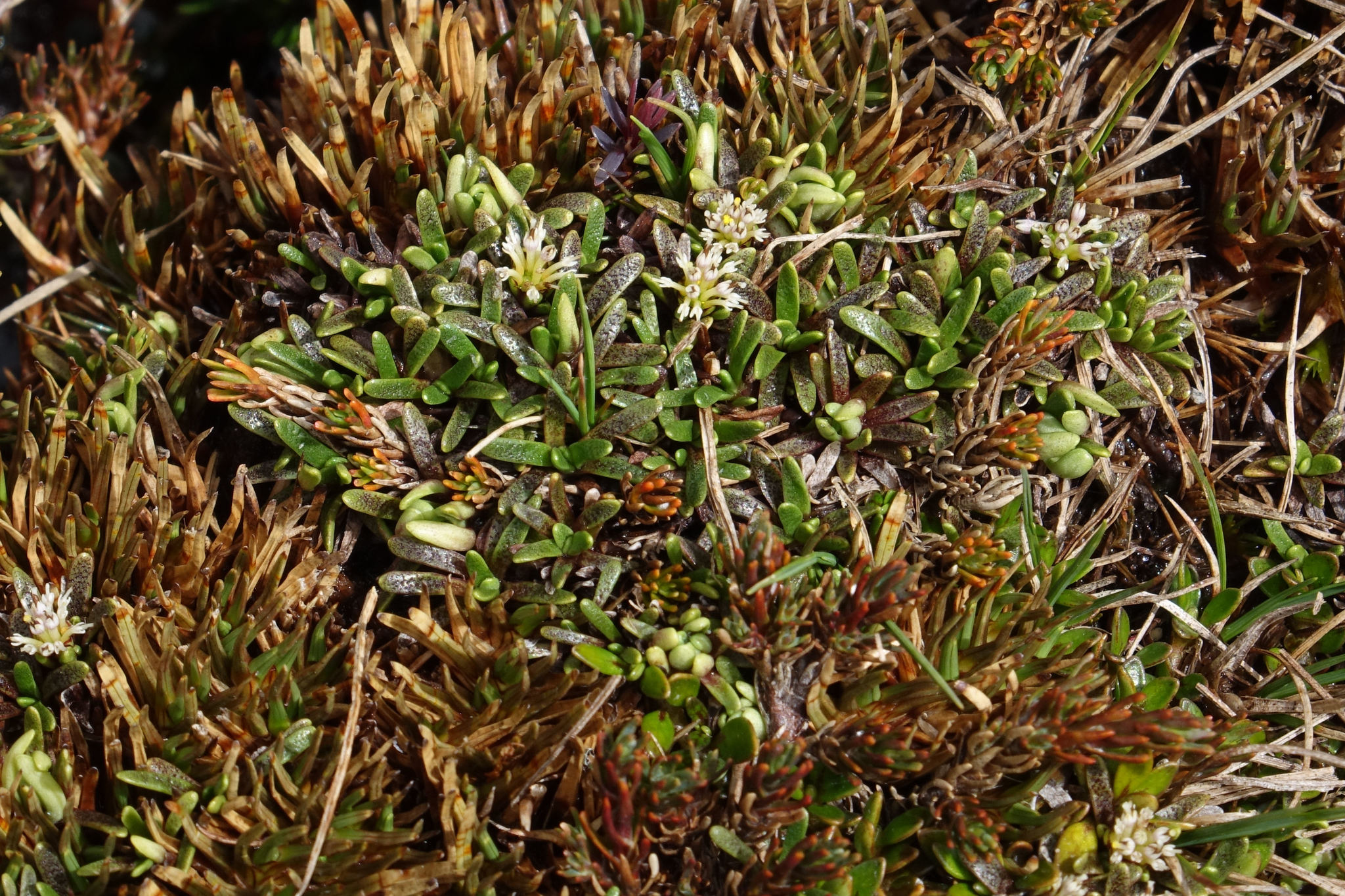
Flowering A. caespitosa

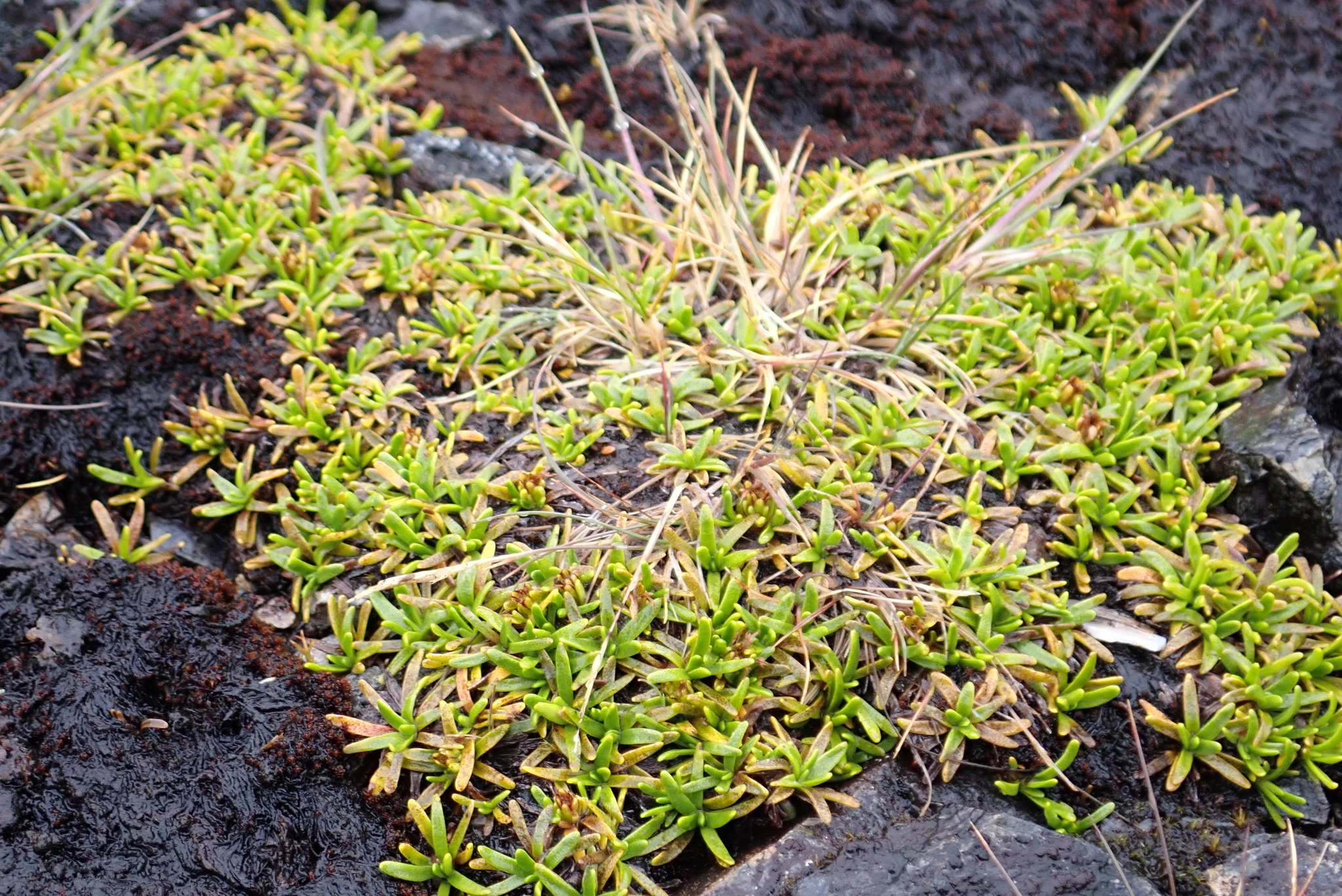
A. caespitosa growing in a rocky alpine environment in the Nelson Lakes National Park
