= Endemic flora of Stewart Island =

About 85% of Stewart Island is a national park

Of the 893 plant taxa (including hybrids) native to Stewart Island or Rakiura (Māori), the third largest Island in New Zealand located south of the South Island, 585 plants are native, and only a fraction are endemic (found nowhere else). (Note: Although Wilson records 28 taxa, five of these are no longer recognised; bringing the count to 23. This does not include Azorella lyallii, which is not officially endemic to Stewart Island, although it is seldom recorded elsewhere.)

Much of this endemism is found in alpine areas, and is represented mostly by small daisies and buttercups. Brachyglottis stewartiae is the only endemic tree. The smaller offshore islands including: Tītī Islands, Codfish Island and islets in the Foveaux Strait are included as Stewart Island in this list. Although David Lyall collected the first plant from Stewart Island in around 1847–51, the first large survey of the flora of Stewart Island was published by botanist Leonard Cockayne in 1909. The most recent full treatment of the island's flora was written by Hugh Wilson in 1987. As Cockayne notes, Stewart Island is a largely unchanged landscape and as a result of this and its unique ecology, it has a national park which covers 85% of its area.

Although the vast majority of plants found on Stewart Island are found in other parts of New Zealand, several of the most common native mainland plants are not found there. Notably missing are any beech trees (Nothofagus sp.), which may be a result of glaciation, as well as kōwhai, māhoe, and kānuka, among others. When glaciers retreated from montane areas of Stewart Island 14,000 years ago, beech trees, as a result of their slow rate of spread, were not fast enough to recolonise. Other common plants were later introduced after their seeds were blown across the Foveaux Strait. Notable ecosystems in Stewart Island include: large dunes formed by pīngao, podocarp forests dominated by kāmahi and rimu, and coastal scrub of tree daisies. The ecosystems most significant to the endemic flora are the alpine and montane herbfields and grasslands–especially the "boggy meadow". The montane zone begins at around 450 m (1,480 ft) and is uniquely affected by very high winds and rates of rainfall, and a lack of sunshine. Although now protected, the endemic flora is put at risk by introduced mammalian predators such as possums and deer. As a result many species are threatened and listed as Naturally Uncommon or, in one plant's case, as Nationally Critical by the New Zealand Threat Classification System (NZTCS).

== Vascular plants ==
Endemic vascular plants of Stewart Island
Scientific name	Image	Common name(s)	Family	NZTCS	Distribution	Ref.
Abrotanella muscosa Kirk, 1892	Small tufts of leaves coming out of the ground		Asteraceae	Naturally Uncommon	Stewart Island	
Aciphylla cartilaginea Petrie, 1915	Small plant with spiky green and brown leaves		Apiaceae	Naturally Uncommon	Stewart Island; subalpine grassland	
Aciphylla stannensis J. W. Dawson, 1980		Tin Range speargrass	Apiaceae	Naturally Uncommon	Stewart Island; on Tin Range	
Aciphylla traillii Kirk, 1884	Small plant with spiky leaves	Stewart Island speargrass	Apiaceae	Naturally Uncommon	Stewart Island	
Brachyglottis stewartiae (J.B.Armstr.) B.Nord., 1978	Cluster of yellow flowers		Asteraceae	Naturally Uncommon	Stewart Island and Foveaux Islets; coastal scrub	
Bulbinella gibbsii var. gibbsii Cockayne, 1909	Small plant with cluster of yellow flowers	Gibbs's Māori onion, Gibbs's lily, Gibbs's onion	Asphodelaceae	Naturally Uncommon	Stewart Island	
Cardamine megalantha Heenan, 2017		Cress	Asphodelaceae	Nationally Endangered	Stewart Island	
Celmisia clavata G.Simpson & J.S.Thomson, 1942	Small cushion plant with white and yellow flowers	Stewart Island silver cushion daisy	Asteraceae	Naturally Uncommon	Stewart Island	
Celmisia polyvena G.Simpson & G.Thomson, 1942	Small white and yellow daisy flower	Tin Range mountain daisy	Asteraceae	Naturally Uncommon	Stewart Island	
Celmisia rigida (Kirk) Cockayne, 1909	Small daisy with leathery leaves		Asteraceae	Naturally Uncommon	Stewart Island; Ernest Islands, Long Island, Codfish Island	
Chionochloa crassiuscula subsp. crassiuscula (Kirk) Zotov,	Small plant spiky brown and green leaves	Pungent snow tussock	Poaceae	Naturally Uncommon	Stewart Island	
Chionochloa lanea Connor Cockayne, 1987		Stewart Island snow tussock	Poaceae	Naturally Uncommon	Stewart Island; montane to alpine grassland	
Craspedia robusta var. pedicellata Kirk, 1987	Two small daisies on beach	Woollyhead	Asteraceae	Naturally Uncommon	Stewart Island	
Gentiana gibbsii (Petrie) T.N.Ho et S.W.Liu, 1993	Small flowers with five white petals	Mt Anglem gentian, Gibbs's gentian	Gentianaceae	Naturally Uncommon	Stewart Island; Mt Anglem and Little Mt Anglem	
Gingidia flabellata (Kirk) J. W. Dawson, 1974	Plant with small shiny leaves in crevice	Stewart Island aniseed	Apiaceae	Naturally Uncommon	Stewart Island; in the south-west	
Leptinella traillii subsp. traillii (Kirk) D.G.Lloyd et C.Webb, 1972	Small plant with furry leaves	Traills Button Daisy	Asteraceae	Naturally Uncommon	Stewart and nearby Islands	
Macrolearia lyallii (Hook.f.) Saldivia, 2022	Bush with furry light green leaves	Subantarctic tree daisy	Asteraceae	Naturally Uncommon	Stewart and nearby Islands	
Poa aucklandica subsp. rakiura Edgar, 1986		Mt Anglem poa	Poaceae	Nationally Critical	Stewart Island; Mt Anglem	
Raoulia goyenii Kirk, 1884	A light green coloured clump-shaped plant	Stewart Island vegetable sheep	Asteraceae	Naturally Uncommon	Stewart Island; herbfield and fellfield	
Ranunculus kirkii Petrie, 1887	Crawling plant with club-shaped leaves		Ranunculaceae	Naturally Uncommon	Stewart Island	
Ranunculus stylosus H.D.Wilson & Garn.-Jones, 1983	Crawing plant with furry club-shaped leaves		Ranunculaceae	Naturally Uncommon	Stewart Island; south	
Ranunculus viridis H.D.Wilson & Garn.-Jones, 1983	Buttercup with small shiny leaves	Mount Allen buttercup	Ranunculaceae	Nationally Critical	Stewart Island; Tin range	

== Non-vascular plants ==
Endemic non-vascular flora of Stewart Island
Scientific name	Image	Common name(s)	Family	NZTCS	Distribution	Ref.
Plagiochila hatcheri Engel et Merr., 1999		Liverwort	Apiaceae	Naturally Uncommon	Stewart Island	
