= Rostrata =

Latin adjective, marine warfare term

Rostratus (masculine), rostrata (feminine) or rostratum (neuter) is a Latin adjective meaning "beaked, curved, hooked, with a crooked point, or with a curved front".

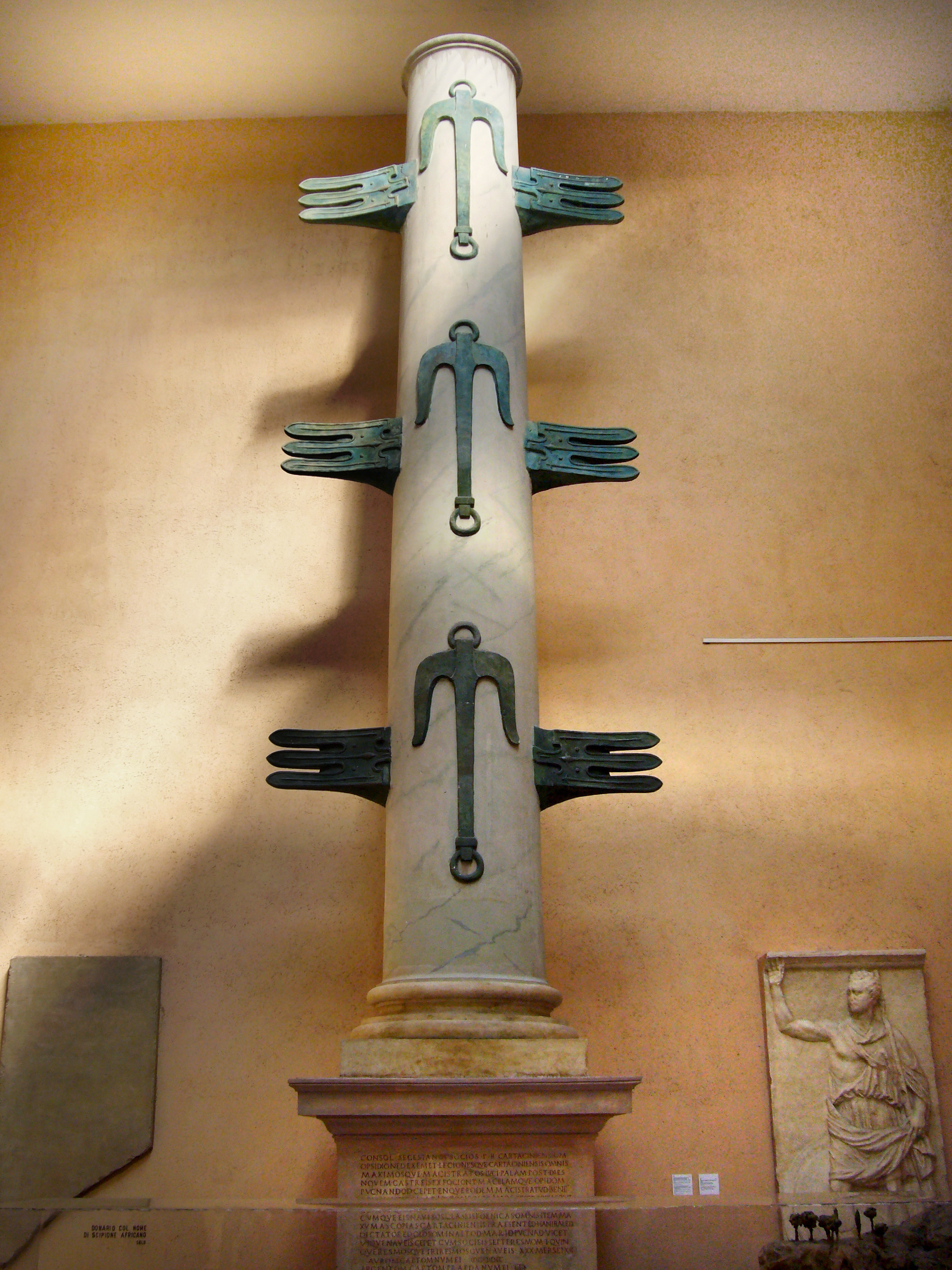
Reproduction of the Columna rostrata of Gaius Duilius (ca. 260 BC) at the Museum of Roman Civilization

In marine warfare, the term beak (rostrum) referred to the ram bows on warships, which were metal or metal-covered beams projecting from ships' bows, used to pierce enemy vessels by ramming.

== Roman usage ==
Columna rostrata (Rostral column)

After the Battle of Mylae in 260 BC during the First Punic War, a columna rostrata (a victory column), was placed in the Roman Forum in honour of Gaius Duilius. It was so called because it was adorned with the beaks (ram bows) of the captured Carthaginian vessels. The columna rostrata became a favourite site for speeches.

Corona rostrata

A corona rostrata was a golden wreath, decorated with small golden prow and beak of a ship. These were awarded to commanders who were victorious in naval warfare.

== Modern usage ==
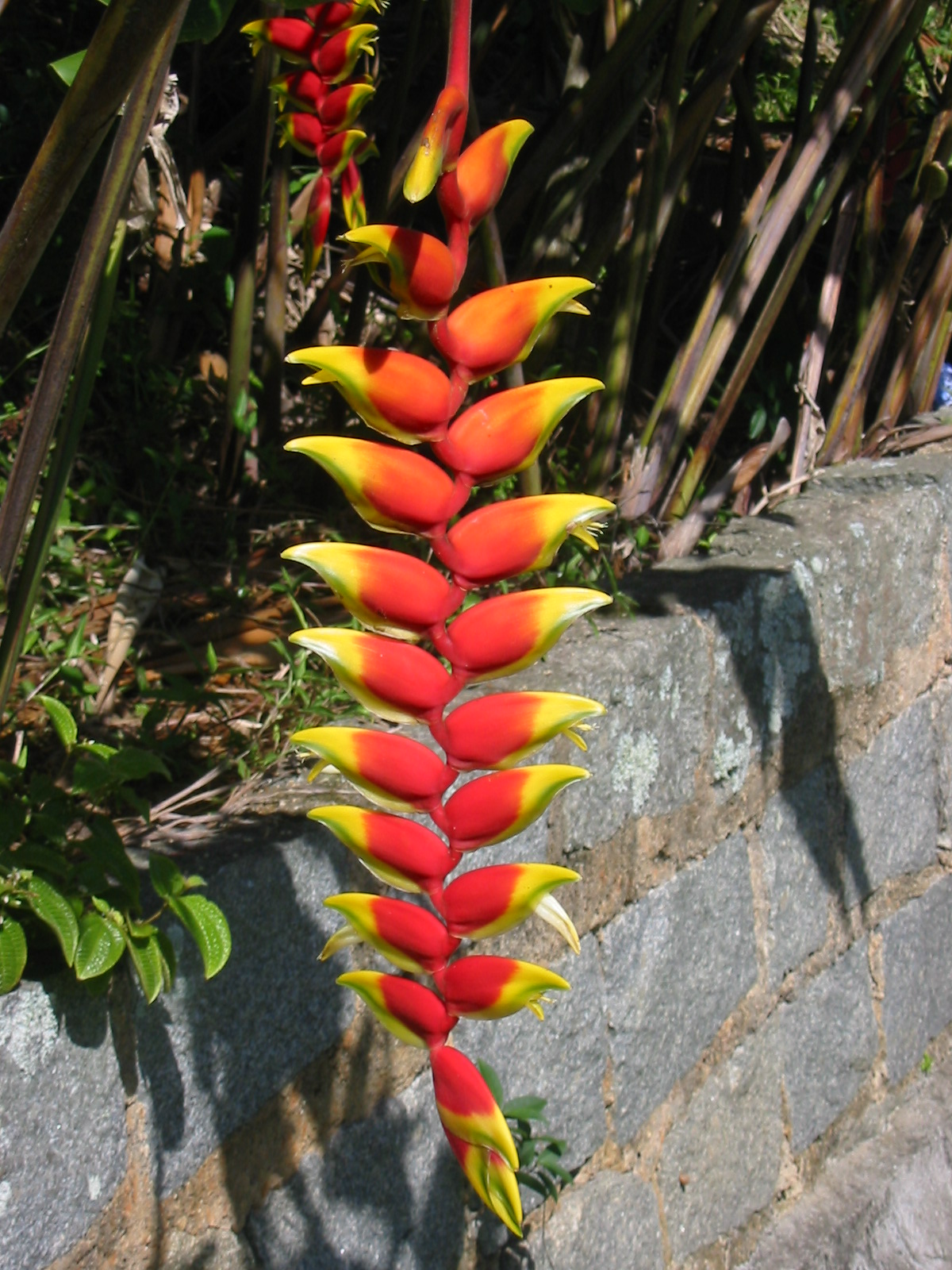
Heliconia rostrata flowers showing characteristic beak shape

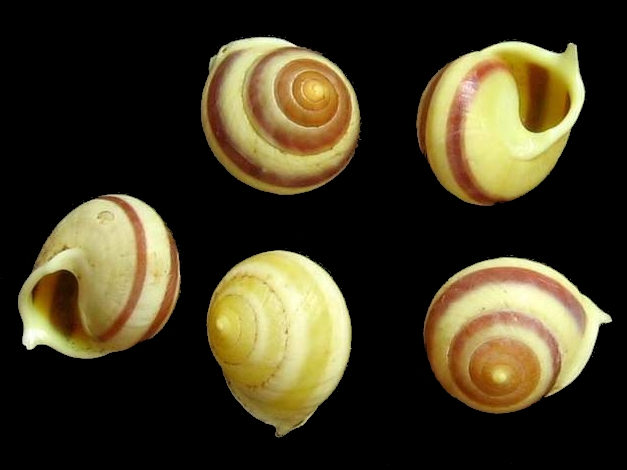
Shells of Helicina rostrata, showing the projection on the aperture

In modern usage the adjective is used in Linnaean taxonomy to refer to a wide variety of species because of the beaked form of part of their anatomy. Examples include:

- Abrotanella rostrata is a species of cushion plant in the family Asteraceae whose white florets produce distinctively beaked cypselae (fruiting bodies).
- Bembix rostrata is a species of sand wasp native to Central Europe whose labrum is extended into a narrow beak.
- Canthigaster rostrata, known as the Caribbean sharpnose-puffer fish, lives in the Western Central Atlantic and is a puffer fish in the fish family Tetraodontidae
- Carex rostrata, known as beaked sedge or bottle sedge, is a large waterside grasslike perennial whose fruits have a beaked shape
- Helicina rostrata is a species of tropical land snail with a small beak-like projection on one side of the aperture of its shell (see image)
- Heliconia rostrata, known as Patujú or lobster claw, is a herbaceous perennial native to north west South America, with characteristic claw-shaped or beak-shaped flowers (see image)
- Yucca rostrata, the beaked yucca, is a tree-like plant belonging to the genus Yucca in southern U.S. and northern Mexico.
- Zebrasoma rostratum, known as the longnose surgeonfish or black tang, is a marine reef tang in the fish family Acanthuridae. It is so called because of its protruding snout.

== See also ==
- Rostrum (disambiguation)
- Rostra
