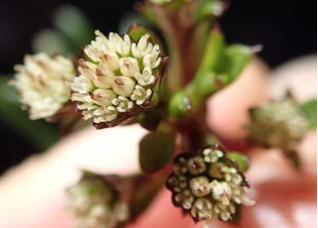

Scientific classification
- Kingdom: Plantae
- Clade: Tracheophytes
- Clade: Angiosperms
- Clade: Eudicots
- Clade: Asterids
- Order: Asterales
- Family: Asteraceae
- Genus: Abrotanella
- Species: A. scapigera

Binomial name
- Abrotanella scapigera (F.Muell.) F.Muell. ex Benth.

Synonyms
- Trineuron scapigerum F.Muell.

= Abrotanella scapigera =

Species of plant

Abrotanella scapigera is an endemic angiosperm of Tasmania, Australia. It is a member of the family Asteraceae, commonly found in alpine regions of northwest and south-central Tasmania. This species is named after its characteristic sparsely leaved flowering stem that distinguishes it from the other 18 species of the Genus.

== Description ==
Abrotanella scapigera is a dicotyledon herb with a rosette leaf pattern. The habit of this species is similar to grass and can be described as loosely caespitose, growing to a height of up to 10 cm. Leaves have a visible midrib and are light green in colour. The margins of the leaf are often smooth or sparingly hairy, with the apex ending in a short point. The stem of the herb has few leaves and some pubescent hair. Flowering occurs from the middle of December to February each year. During this time erect heads (capitulum) extend from the plant within which white, tubular florets occur that lack a pappus. These florets are arranged in a disk shape, with outer florets growing approximately 1mm long while central florets grow 1.5–2.0 mm long. Positioned beneath and around the head are modified leaves known as bracts.

== Habitat and distribution ==
Abrotanella scapigera is endemic to Tasmania and commonly occurs in alpine areas between 950 and 1400 metres above sea level. This species requires moist microsites for growth and is occasionally found to be growing in the shelter of low shrubs. Habitat type varies greatly and can include coniferous heathland, sedgeland, heathland, and low alpine grassland.

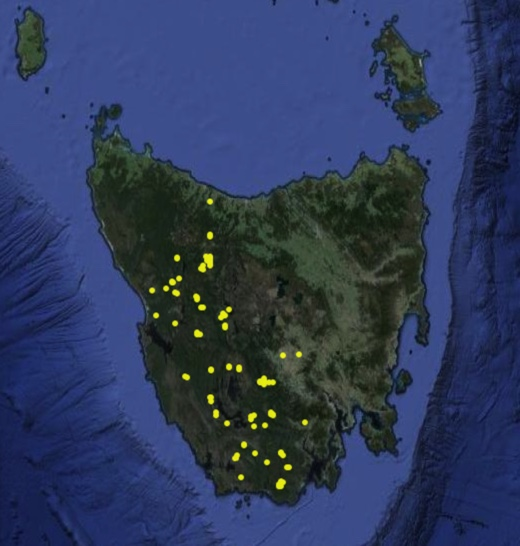
Distribution of Abrotanella scapigera from Atlas of Living Australia

This plant is also a constituent of fjaeldmark and snow patch plant communities, along with species such as Poa gunnii, Montitega dealbata and Richea sprengelioides. These two vegetation communities are exposed to and shaped by a combination of high-intensity winds and abrasive conditions including intense solar exposure, snow, ice, grit, and blown rain. Fjaeldmark (also known as Feldmark) only occurs in a restricted environmental window and is therefore limited to areas such as Southern Tasmania. Snow Patch communities are more common and can be found on Mt Eliza, Cradle Mountain, and Mount Field National Park.

== Associations and distinctions from similar species ==
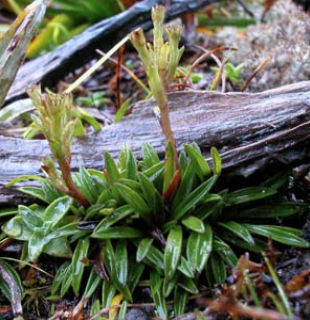
Growing pattern of Abrotanella scapigera

Within Genus Abrotanella there are 19 species, all of which are small alpine to sub-alpine plants. Abrotanella scapigera has the closest evolutionary relationship to two of these species, Abrotanella rosulata and Abrotanella spathulata. Both A. rosulata and A. spathulata are endemic to the sub-Antarctic Cambell and Auckland islands. Further distinctions between these three closely related species include the absence of vascular tissue in the outer florets of A. rosulata and A. spathulata, as well as the colour of central florets which are white for A. scapigera and purple for A. rosulata and A. spathulata.

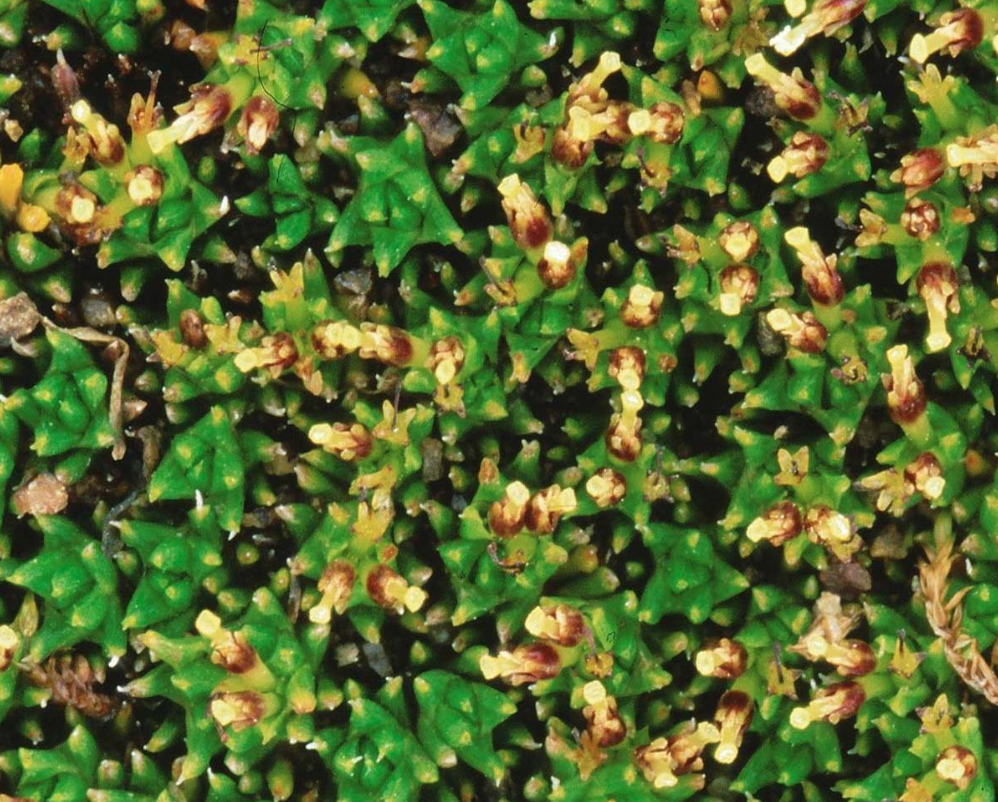
Growing pattern of Abrotanella forsteroides

Only one other species within Genus Abrotanella occurs in Tasmania. This is Abrotanella forsteroides, a plant that is also endemic to the state. Both A. forsteroides and A. scapigera have simple flower heads, containing only a few tubular flowers. These species can easily be distinguished by their contrasting growth habits, with A. forsteroides forming dense cushions often intermixed with other plants, while A. scapigera grows as a rosette herb that is comparatively less compact and low-growing. The leaves of each species are also dissimilar, with those of A. forsteroides growing to a length of approximately 8mm, the apex of which is covered in fine hair. Comparatively, the leaves of A. scapigera are smooth or sparingly hairy and grow over 1 cm long.

== Uses ==
Fjaeldmark plant communities are an artefact of macroclimatic conditions and have characteristically narrow climatic niches and limited occurrence. As a result of these factors, Fjaeldmark has been identified as a priority for monitoring the impacts of the changing climate in the Tasmanian Wilderness World Heritage Area (TWWHA). Plant populations within these communities are monitored and changes are mapped over time, with A. scapigera therefore being used as a sample species (among many others) for understanding the impacts of climate change at a small scale.
