= Abrotanella submarginata =

Scientific classification
- Kingdom: Plantae
- Clade: Tracheophytes
- Clade: Angiosperms
- Clade: Eudicots
- Clade: Asterids
- Order: Asterales
- Family: Asteraceae
- Genus: Abrotanella
- Species: A. submarginata

Binomial name
- Abrotanella submarginata A.Gray

Species of plant

Abrotanella submarginata is a member of the daisy family and is an endemic species found in Chile (Magallanes).
