= Abrotanella filiformis =

Scientific classification
- Kingdom: Plantae
- Clade: Tracheophytes
- Clade: Angiosperms
- Clade: Eudicots
- Clade: Asterids
- Order: Asterales
- Family: Asteraceae
- Genus: Abrotanella
- Species: A. filiformis

Binomial name
- Abrotanella filiformis Petrie

Species of flowering plant

Abrotanella filiformis is a species of flowering plant in the family Asteraceae. It is endemic to Stewart Island in southern New Zealand.
