= Abrotanella purpurea =

Scientific classification
- Kingdom: Plantae
- Clade: Tracheophytes
- Clade: Angiosperms
- Clade: Eudicots
- Clade: Asterids
- Order: Asterales
- Family: Asteraceae
- Genus: Abrotanella
- Species: A. purpurea

Binomial name
- Abrotanella purpurea Swenson

Species of plant

Abrotanella purpurea is a member of the daisy family and is endemic species of southern Chile.
