= Abrotanella trilobata =

Scientific classification
- Kingdom: Plantae
- Clade: Tracheophytes
- Clade: Angiosperms
- Clade: Eudicots
- Clade: Asterids
- Order: Asterales
- Family: Asteraceae
- Genus: Abrotanella
- Species: A. trilobata

Binomial name
- Abrotanella trilobata Swenson

Species of plant

Abrotanella trilobata is a member of the daisy family and is found in southern Argentina and southern Chile.
