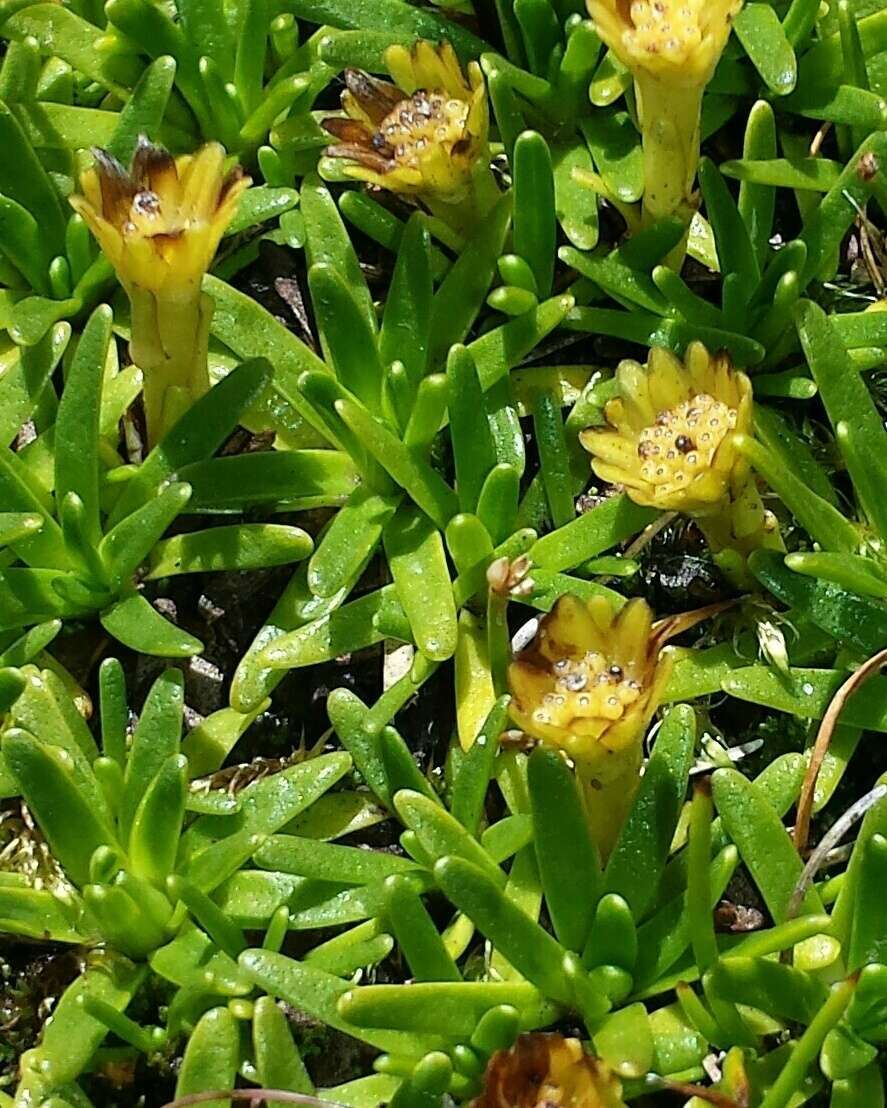
- (image: Russell Best, 2015)

Scientific classification
- Kingdom: Plantae
- Clade: Tracheophytes
- Clade: Angiosperms
- Clade: Eudicots
- Clade: Asterids
- Order: Asterales
- Family: Asteraceae
- Genus: Abrotanella
- Species: A. nivigena

Binomial name
- Abrotanella nivigena (F.Muell.) F.Muell.

Synonyms
- Trineuron nivigenum F.Muell.

= Abrotanella nivigena =

Species of plant

Abrotanella nivigena (common name - Snow wort) is a member of the daisy family and ranges from southeast New South Wales to eastern Victoria, Australia, growing in the Kosciuszko region. It is a cushion plant growing from 3 to 5 cm tall.

It was first described in 1855 as Trineuron nivigenum by Ferdinand von Mueller, who described it as growing "on grassy or gravelly places in the Munyang Mountains, irrigated by melting glaciers" at altitudes of 5000 to 6000 feet. Mueller redescribed it in 1865 as Abrotanella nivigena. Similar plants in Papua New Guinea were previously included in this species, but molecular evidence indicates that these are not the same, and the New Guinean plants have now reverted to the previous name of Abrotanella papuana Moore.

== Gallery ==
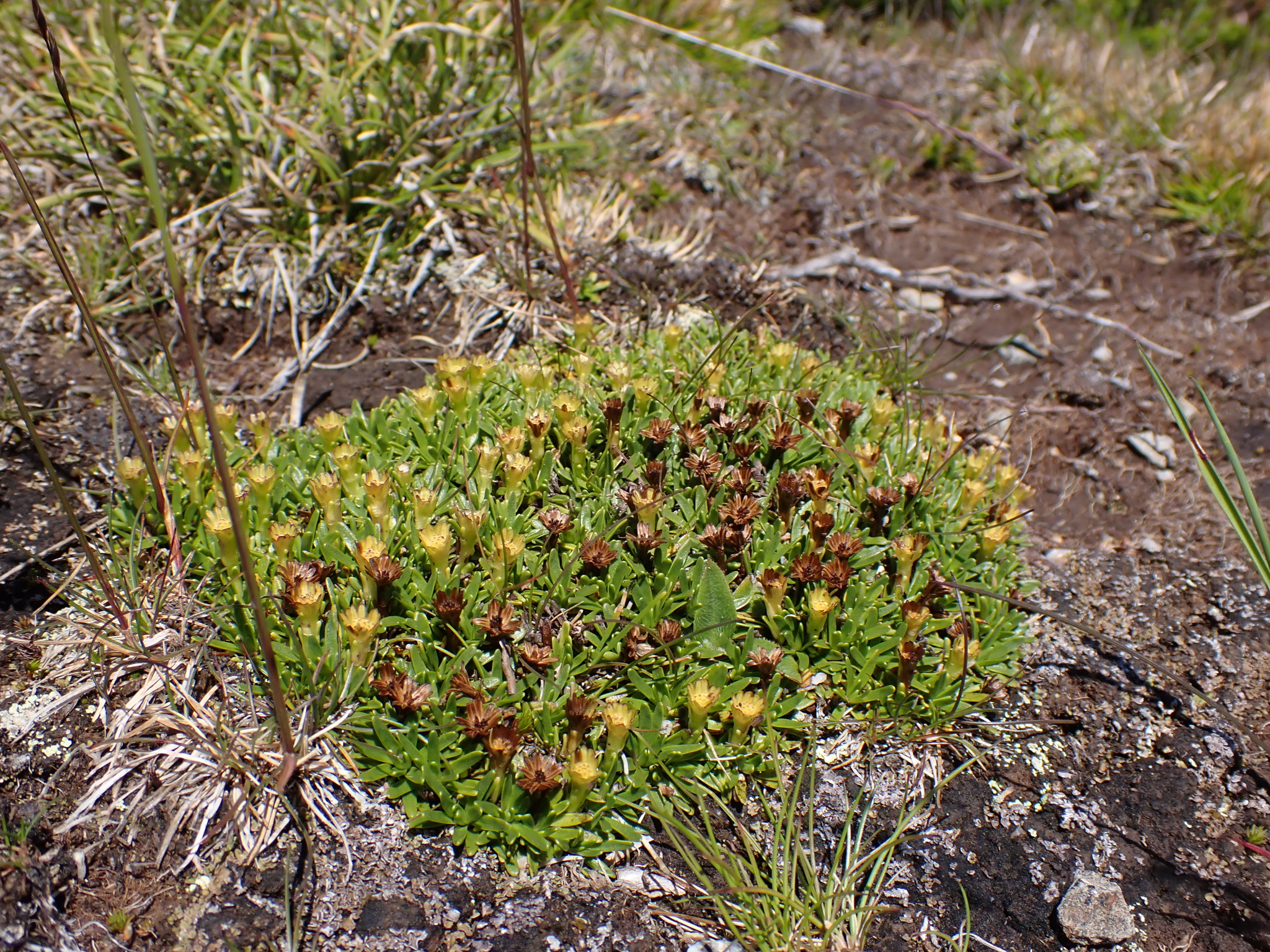

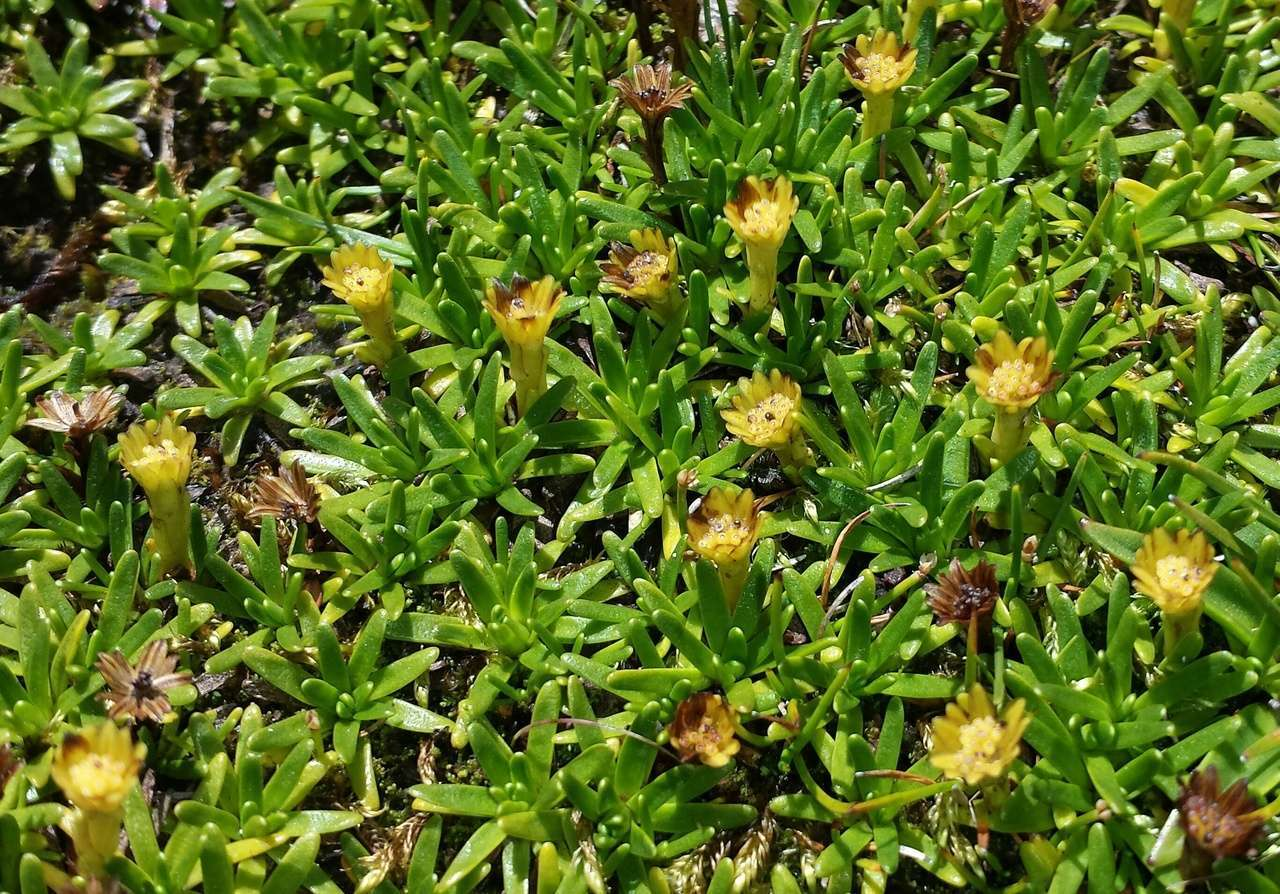

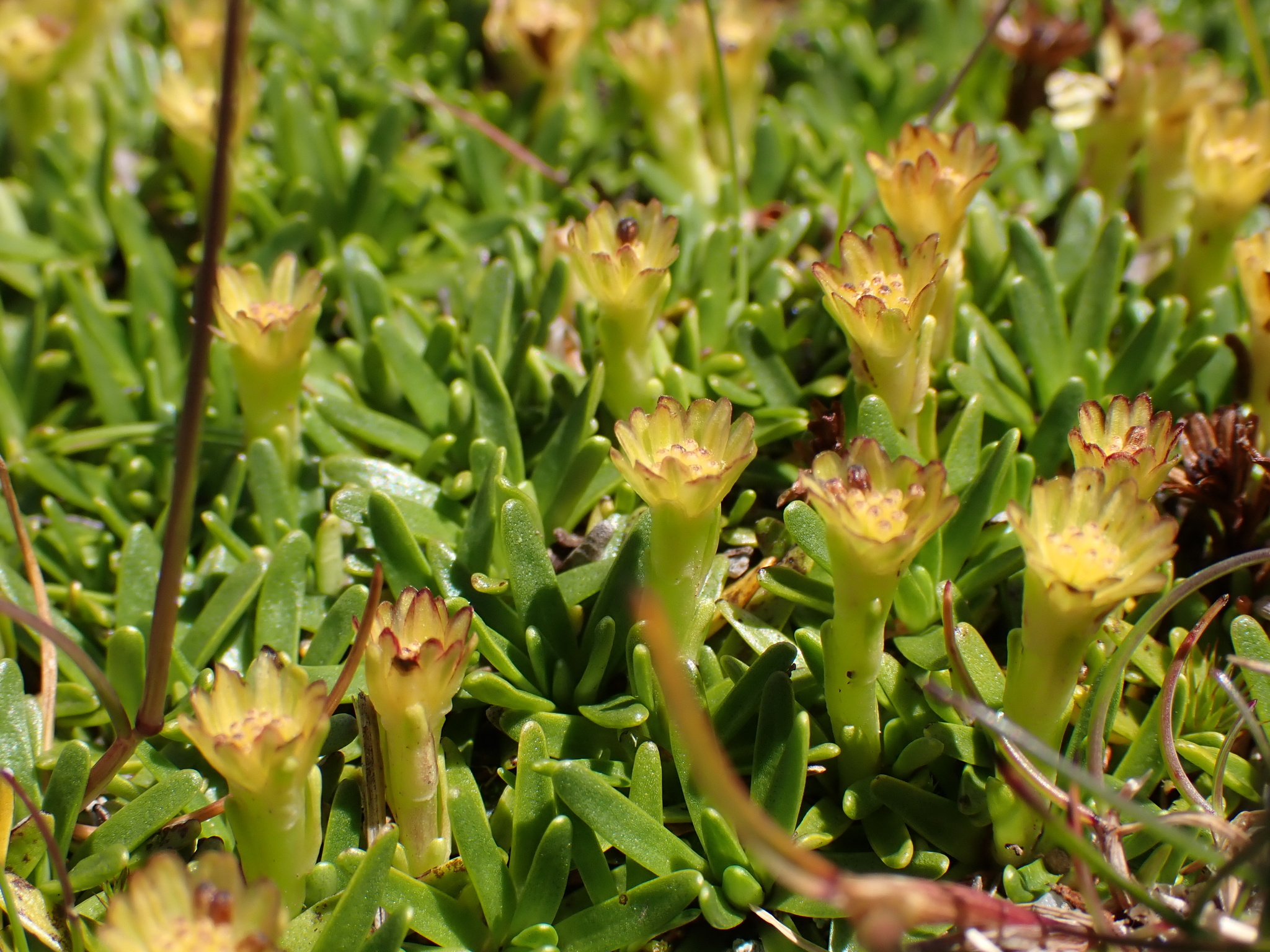
