= Abrotanella diemii =

Scientific classification
- Kingdom: Plantae
- Clade: Tracheophytes
- Clade: Angiosperms
- Clade: Eudicots
- Clade: Asterids
- Order: Asterales
- Family: Asteraceae
- Genus: Abrotanella
- Species: A. diemii

Binomial name
- Abrotanella diemii Cabrera

Species of plant

Abrotanella diemii is a member of the daisy family and is an endemic species of southern Argentina, (Neuquén).
