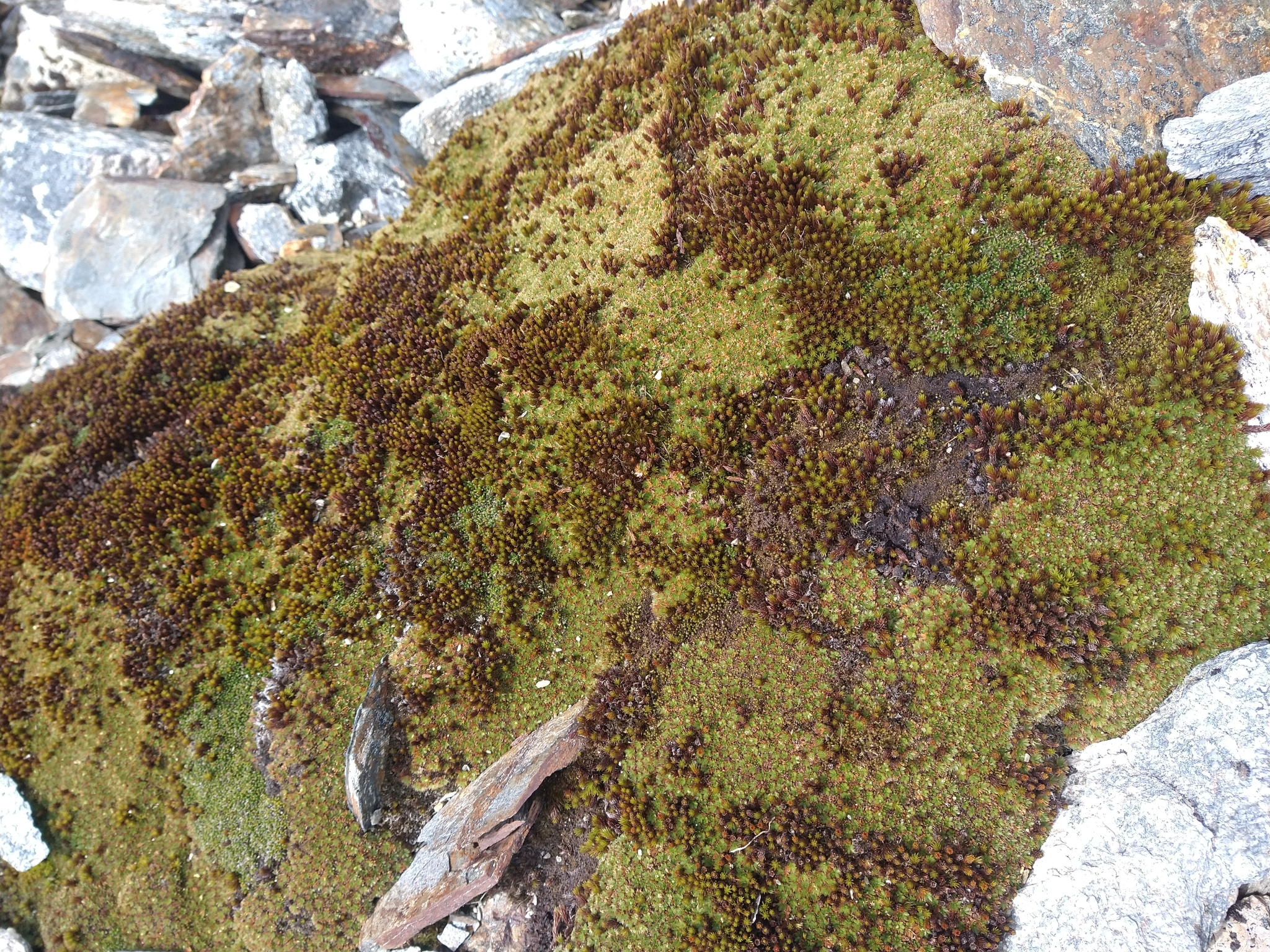

Scientific classification
- Kingdom: Plantae
- Clade: Tracheophytes
- Clade: Angiosperms
- Clade: Eudicots
- Clade: Asterids
- Order: Asterales
- Family: Asteraceae
- Genus: Abrotanella
- Species: A. emarginata

Binomial name
- Abrotanella emarginata (Gaudich.) Cass.

Synonyms
- Oligosporus emarginatus Cass.

= Abrotanella emarginata =

Species of plant

Abrotanella emarginata is a member of the daisy family and is found in Patagonia, the Falkland Islands and New Guinea.
