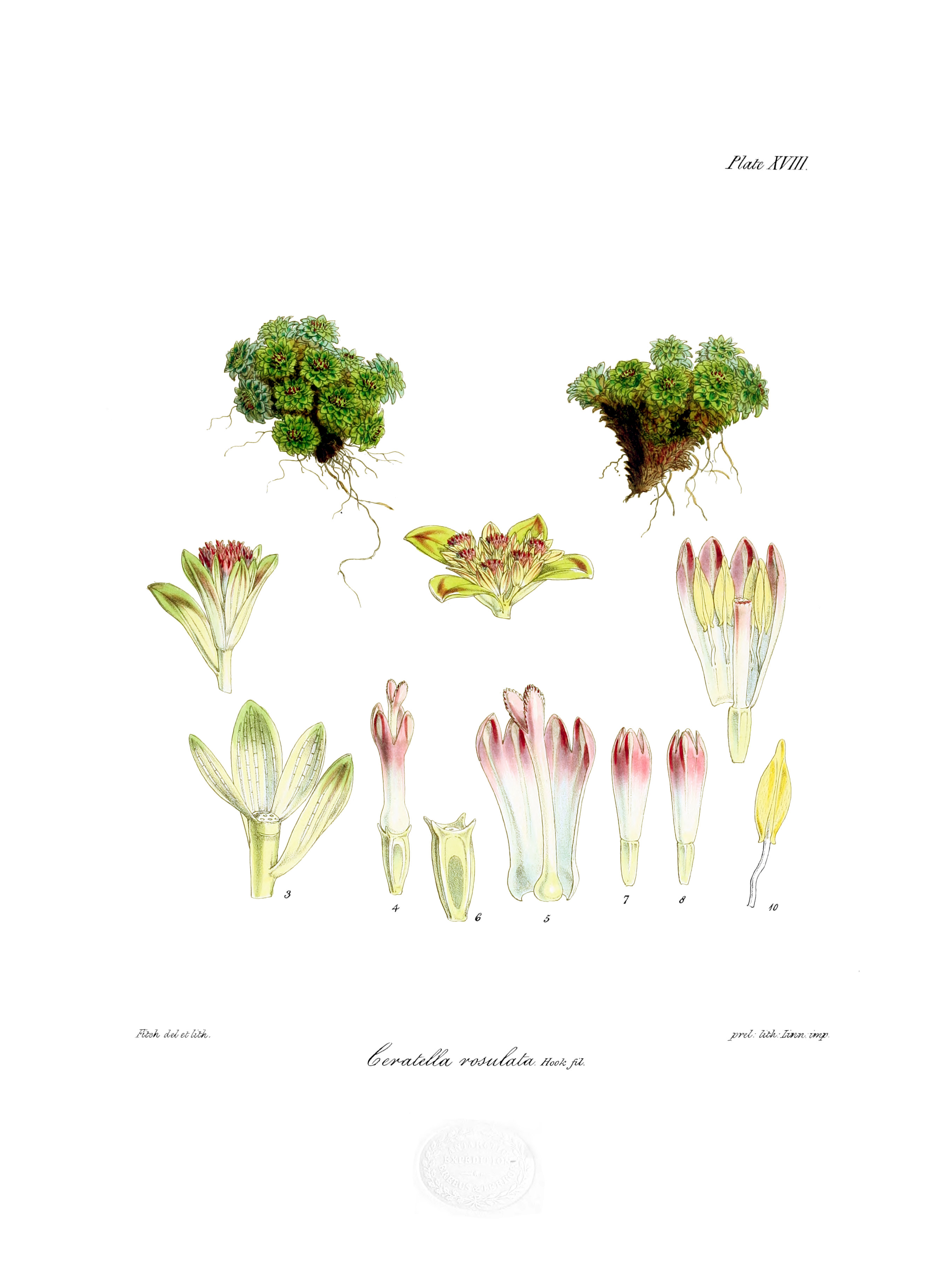

Conservation status
- Naturally Uncommon (NZ TCS)

Scientific classification
- Kingdom: Plantae
- Clade: Tracheophytes
- Clade: Angiosperms
- Clade: Eudicots
- Clade: Asterids
- Order: Asterales
- Family: Asteraceae
- Genus: Abrotanella
- Species: A. rosulata

Binomial name
- Abrotanella rosulata (Hook.f.) Hook.f.

Synonyms
- Ceratella rosulata Hook.f.

= Abrotanella rosulata =

Species of flowering plant

Abrotanella rosulata is a plant in the family Asteraceae, endemic to the Campbell Islands.

== Description ==
Hooker describes it as "a small, densely tufted, moss-like herb", with stems that are 1–1.5 inches (2.5–3.8 cm) high. The leaves overlap, and are recurved, rigid, and leathery. They are 1/4-1/3 in long, narrow ovate or lanceolate, acute, concave above. The flower heads are aggregated amongst the upper leaves and 1/10 in long. There are 8-10 involucral scales which are linear oblong, and leathery with translucent veins. The male flower has a four-angled corolla, and the angles are translucent. The female flower has a tubular corolla, and is four-toothed. The achene is four-angled.

== Taxonomy ==
It was first described in 1844 as Ceratella rosulata by Joseph Dalton Hooker who found it in the Campbell Islands, "in crevices of rocks at the tops of the mountains, at an elevation of 1400 feet", but in 1864 he amended the genus to Abrotanella.

== Conservation status ==
In 2009 and 2012, it was declared "At Risk - Naturally Uncommon" under the New Zealand Threat Classification System. In 2018 its status remained as "At Risk - Naturally Uncommon" due to its restricted range.
