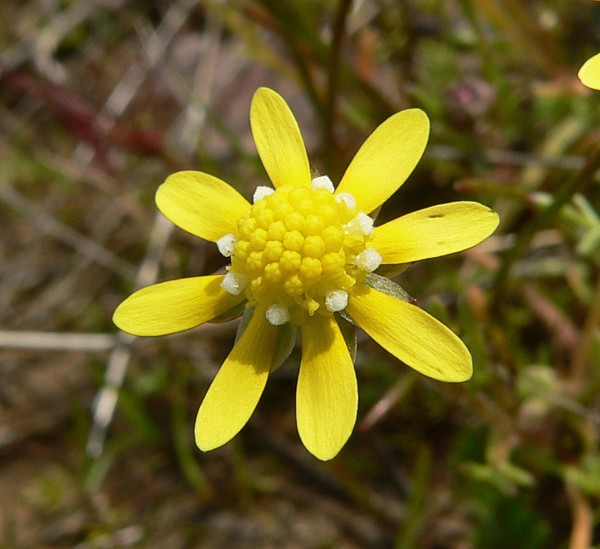

Conservation status
- Apparently Secure (NatureServe)

Scientific classification
- Kingdom: Plantae
- Clade: Tracheophytes
- Clade: Angiosperms
- Clade: Eudicots
- Clade: Asterids
- Order: Asterales
- Family: Asteraceae
- Genus: Blennosperma
- Species: B. nanum

Binomial name
- Blennosperma nanum (Hook.) S.F.Blake

Synonyms
- Chrysanthemum nanum Hook.

= Blennosperma nanum =

Species of flowering plant

Blennosperma nanum is an annual plant in the daisy family native to California. Common names include glue-seed, common stickyseed, and yellow carpet.

== Description ==
It is an annual with small yellow flower heads The heads are a paler yellow than many other daisy-like flowers, and the ring of stamens ooze a viscous white juice containing the pollen. The fruits are also carried in a gluey fluid. The Greek name for the genus means "slimy seed."

== Distribution ==
The species is distributed throughout the lower elevations in California from Shasta County to San Diego County, but nowhere is it particularly abundant. It is a resident of vernal pool floral communities. Glue-seed is often one of the first flowers to bloom as winter turns to spring.

Subspecies

- Blennosperma nanum var. robustum: the Point Reyes subspecies of the plant, sometimes called Point Reyes blennosperma, is very rare and is only found in that isolated area.
- Blennosperma nanum var. nanum is much more common, and is sometimes called common blennosperma, yellow carpet, or meadow daisy.
