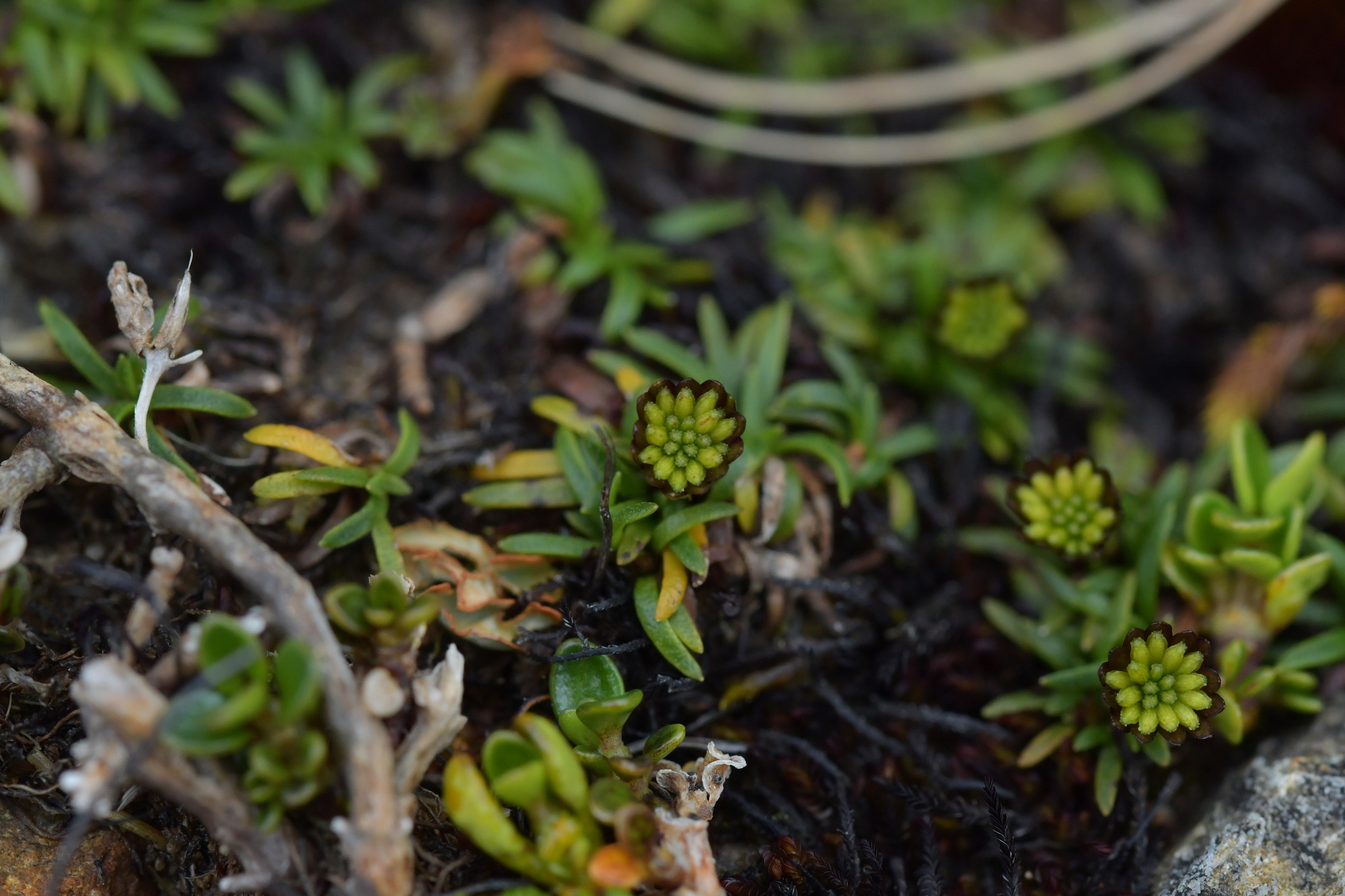

Scientific classification
- Kingdom: Plantae
- Clade: Tracheophytes
- Clade: Angiosperms
- Clade: Eudicots
- Clade: Asterids
- Order: Asterales
- Family: Asteraceae
- Genus: Abrotanella
- Species: A. pusilla

Binomial name
- Abrotanella pusilla (Hook.f.) Hook.f.

Synonyms
- Trineuron pusillum Hook.f.

= Abrotanella pusilla =

Species of plant

Abrotanella pusilla is a member of the daisy family and is an endemic species of New Zealand.

== Description ==
Stock slender, multicipital, or the branches elongate, creeping and rooting; lvs scattered along branches and tufted at base of erect peduncles clad in lflike bracts; ± 1-1∙5 cm. × 1 mm., linear, straight to falcate, spreading to recurved, apiculate to subacute, coriac., glab. to sparsely hairy near sheathing base. Peduncles slender, up to c. 2 cm. long in fr. Capitula c. 5 mm. diam.; phyll. 8-14, oblong, obtuse to subacute, c. 3 mm. long, veins often obscure. Florets 10-25; achenes linear-clavate, 4-ribbed on one face, each rib produced into a short appendage.

== Taxonomy ==
Abrotanella pusilla was collected and described by Joseph Dalton Hooker. The specific epithet pusilla likely comes from the hairy sheathing near the base, as pusilla means 'hairy' in Latin.

== Habitat ==
Subalpine and subarctic biomes.

== Ecology ==
It can host several species of fungi.
