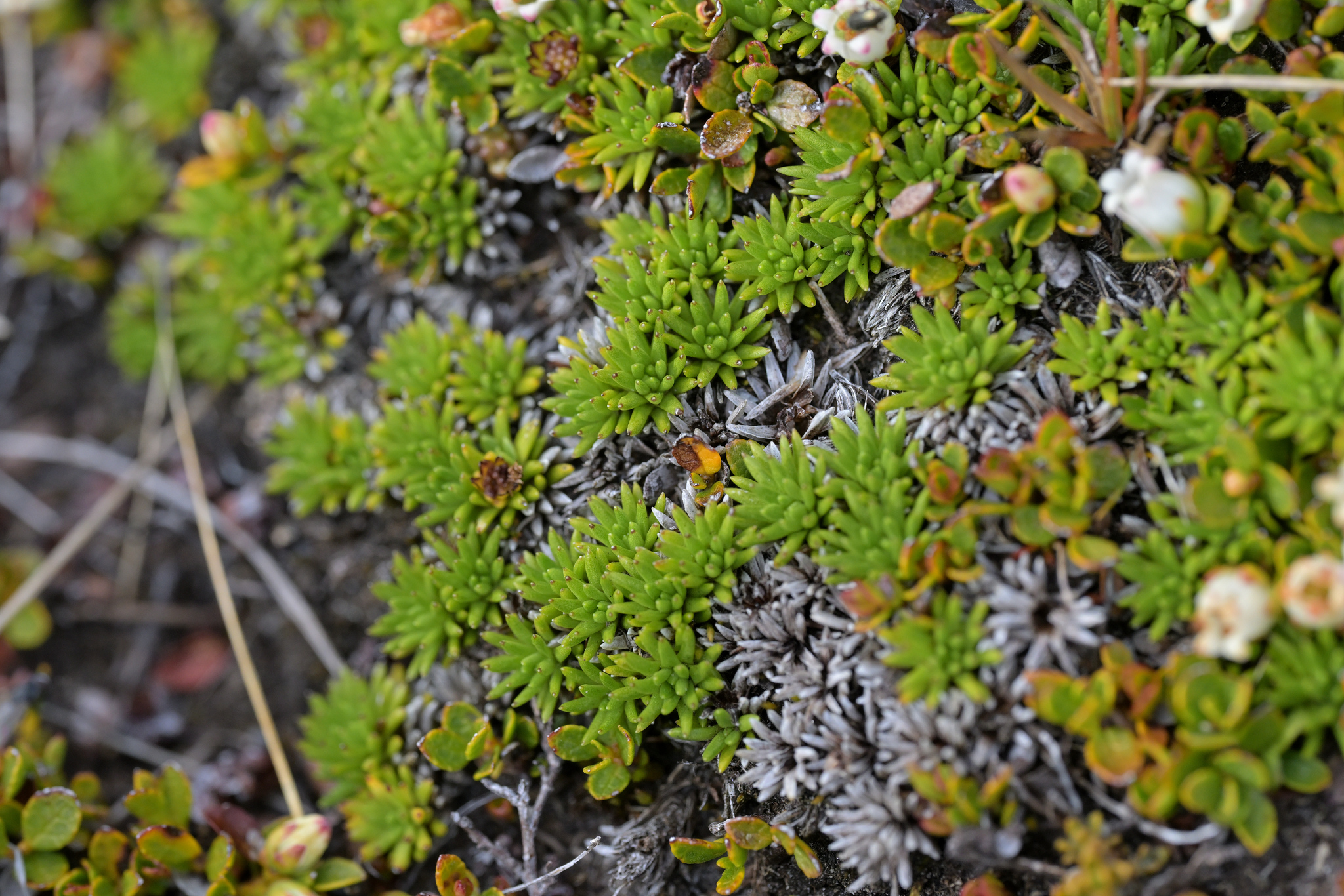

Scientific classification
- Kingdom: Plantae
- Clade: Embryophytes
- Clade: Tracheophytes
- Clade: Spermatophytes
- Clade: Angiosperms
- Clade: Eudicots
- Clade: Asterids
- Order: Asterales
- Family: Asteraceae
- Genus: Abrotanella
- Species: A. inconspicua

Binomial name
- Abrotanella inconspicua Hook.f.

= Abrotanella inconspicua =

Species of plant

Abrotanella inconspicua is a member of the daisy family and is native to Stewart Island and the South Island of New Zealand. The flowers of this plant are coloured cream and yellow.
