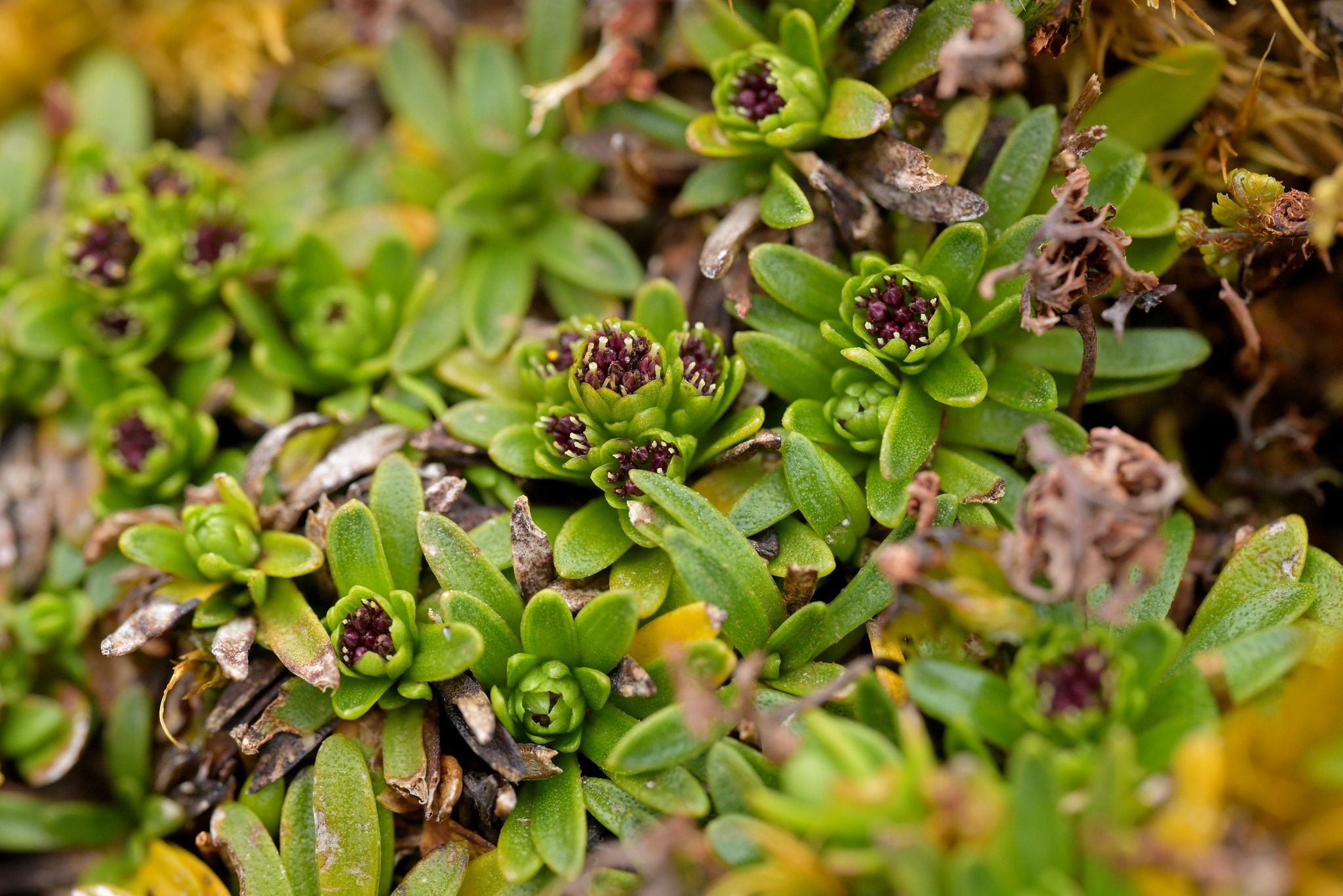

Scientific classification
- Kingdom: Plantae
- Clade: Embryophytes
- Clade: Tracheophytes
- Clade: Spermatophytes
- Clade: Angiosperms
- Clade: Eudicots
- Clade: Asterids
- Order: Asterales
- Family: Asteraceae
- Genus: Abrotanella
- Species: A. spathulata

Binomial name
- Abrotanella spathulata (Hook.f.) Hook.f.

Synonyms
- Trineuron spathulatum Hook.f.

= Abrotanella spathulata =

Species of plant

Abrotanella spathulata is a member of the daisy family and is an endemic species of the Antipodean Islands.
