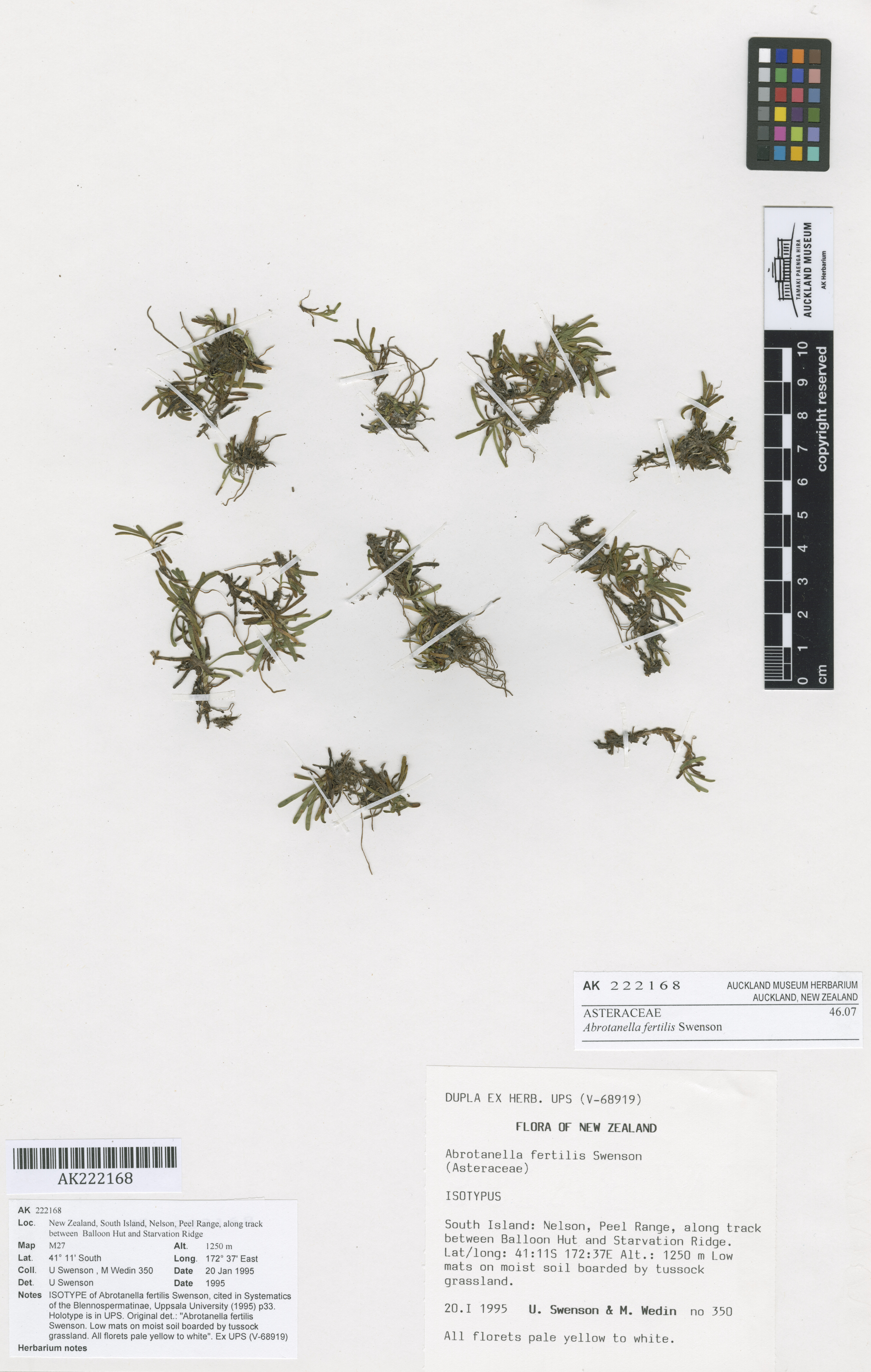

Scientific classification
- Kingdom: Plantae
- Clade: Tracheophytes
- Clade: Angiosperms
- Clade: Eudicots
- Clade: Asterids
- Order: Asterales
- Family: Asteraceae
- Genus: Abrotanella
- Species: A. fertilis

Binomial name
- Abrotanella fertilis Swenson

= Abrotanella fertilis =

Species of plant

Abrotanella fertilis is a member of the daisy family and is an endemic species of New Zealand.

== Biology ==
A. fertilis is a small plant with long (under 2mm), thin, green leaves, which form large mats. Its flowers are cream or yellow, with central florets. It is anemochorous, meaning that the cypselae are wind-dispersed.

== Taxonomy ==
First described in 1995. Fertilis derives from Latin and refers to the "fertile central florets".

== Distribution and habitat ==
A. fertilis grows in both the North and South Islands of New Zealand, mainly in subalpine or subarctic areas. It can grow as low as 600m in elevation, but mostly lives in habitats from 900m to 1450m.
