= Abrotanella linearifolia =

Scientific classification
- Kingdom: Plantae
- Clade: Tracheophytes
- Clade: Angiosperms
- Clade: Eudicots
- Clade: Asterids
- Order: Asterales
- Family: Asteraceae
- Genus: Abrotanella
- Species: A. linearifolia

Binomial name
- Abrotanella linearifolia A.Gray

Synonyms
- Abrotanella crassipes Skottsb.; Abrotanella moseleyi Skottsb.

Species of plant

Abrotanella linearifolia is a member of the daisy family and is found in Chile, South America.
