= Abrotanella trichoachaenia =

Scientific classification
- Kingdom: Plantae
- Clade: Tracheophytes
- Clade: Angiosperms
- Clade: Eudicots
- Clade: Asterids
- Order: Asterales
- Family: Asteraceae
- Genus: Abrotanella
- Species: A. trichoachaenia

Binomial name
- Abrotanella trichoachaenia Cabrera

Species of plant

Abrotanella trichoachaenia is a member of the daisy family and is found in southern Chile to Argentina (Neuquén, Rio Negro).
