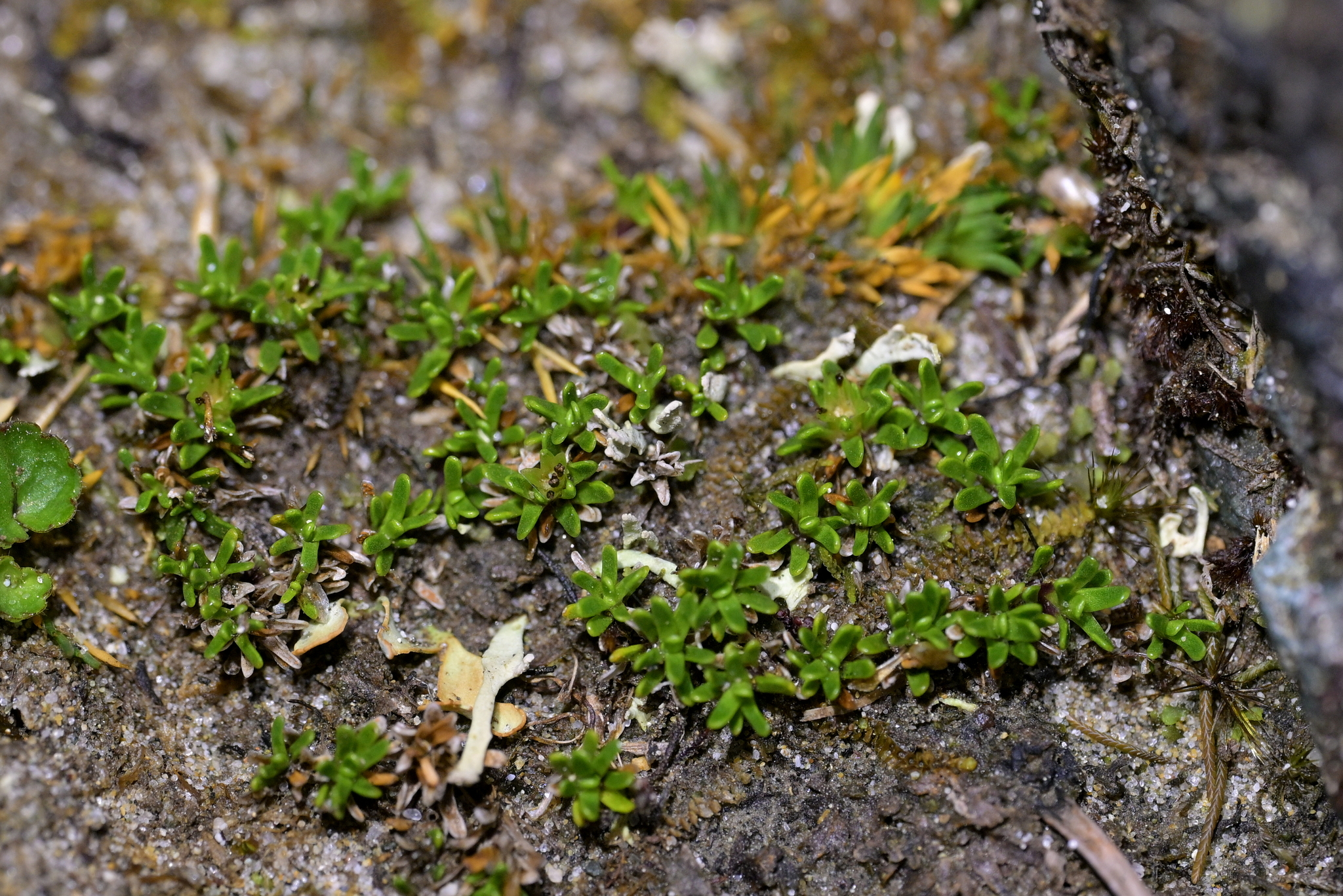
- Abrotanella muscosa Kirk

Conservation status
- Naturally Uncommon (NZ TCS)

Scientific classification
- Kingdom: Plantae
- Clade: Tracheophytes
- Clade: Angiosperms
- Clade: Eudicots
- Clade: Asterids
- Order: Asterales
- Family: Asteraceae
- Genus: Abrotanella
- Species: A. muscosa

Binomial name
- Abrotanella muscosa Kirk

= Abrotanella muscosa =

Species of plant

Abrotanella muscosa is a member of the daisy family and is found on Stewart Island, New Zealand.

== Taxonomy ==
Abrotanella muscosa is a species in the family Asteraceae. It was described by New Zealand botanist Thomas Kirk in 1892. The type specimen was collected on the "summit of Rakiahua" on Stewart Island.

== Distribution ==
This species is endemic to New Zealand. It is found on Stewart Island.

== Conservation status ==
A. muscosa is listed as At Risk - Naturally Uncommon on the latest threat listing for New Zealand plants.

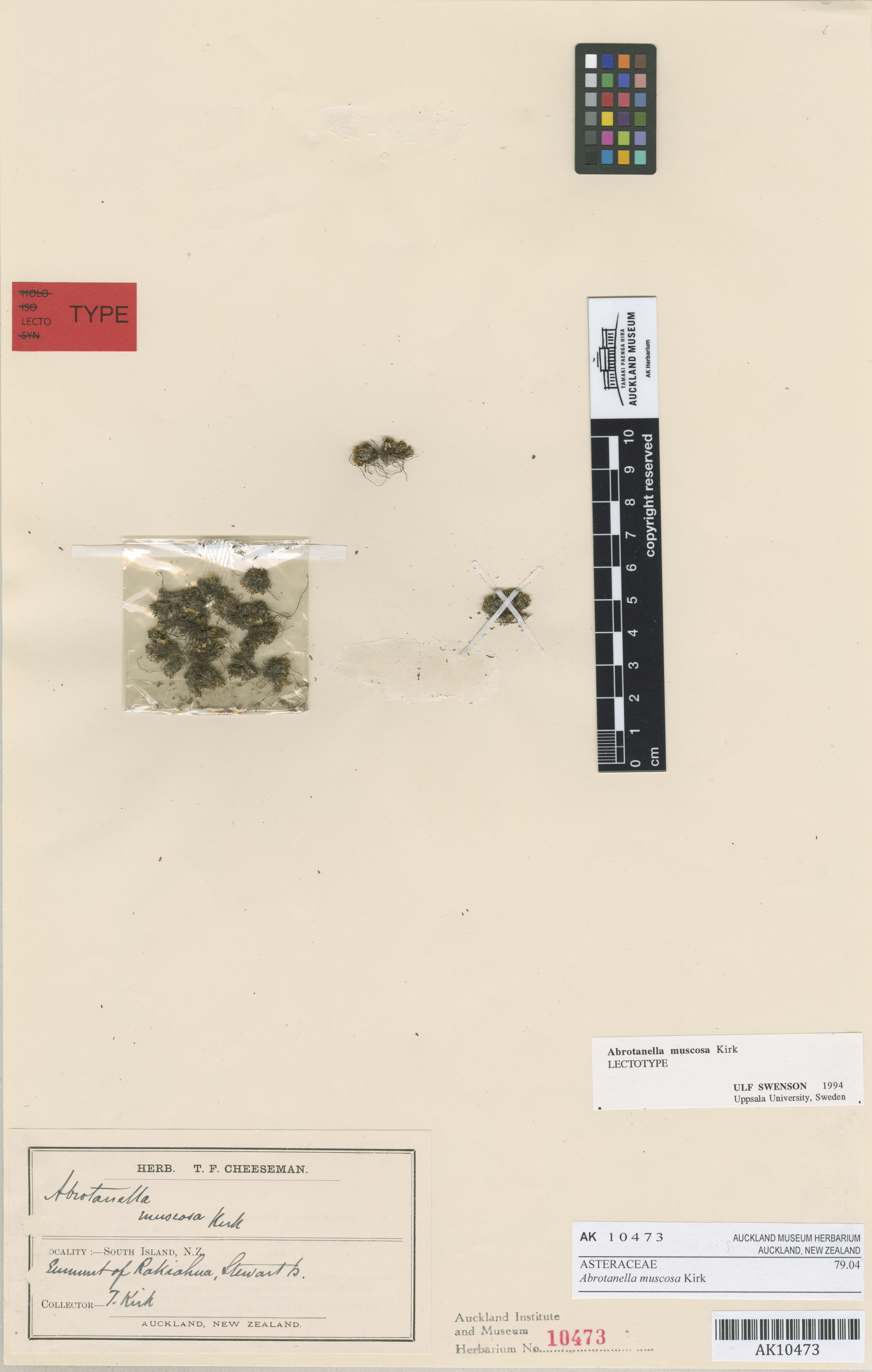
Herbarium specimen of A. muscosa
