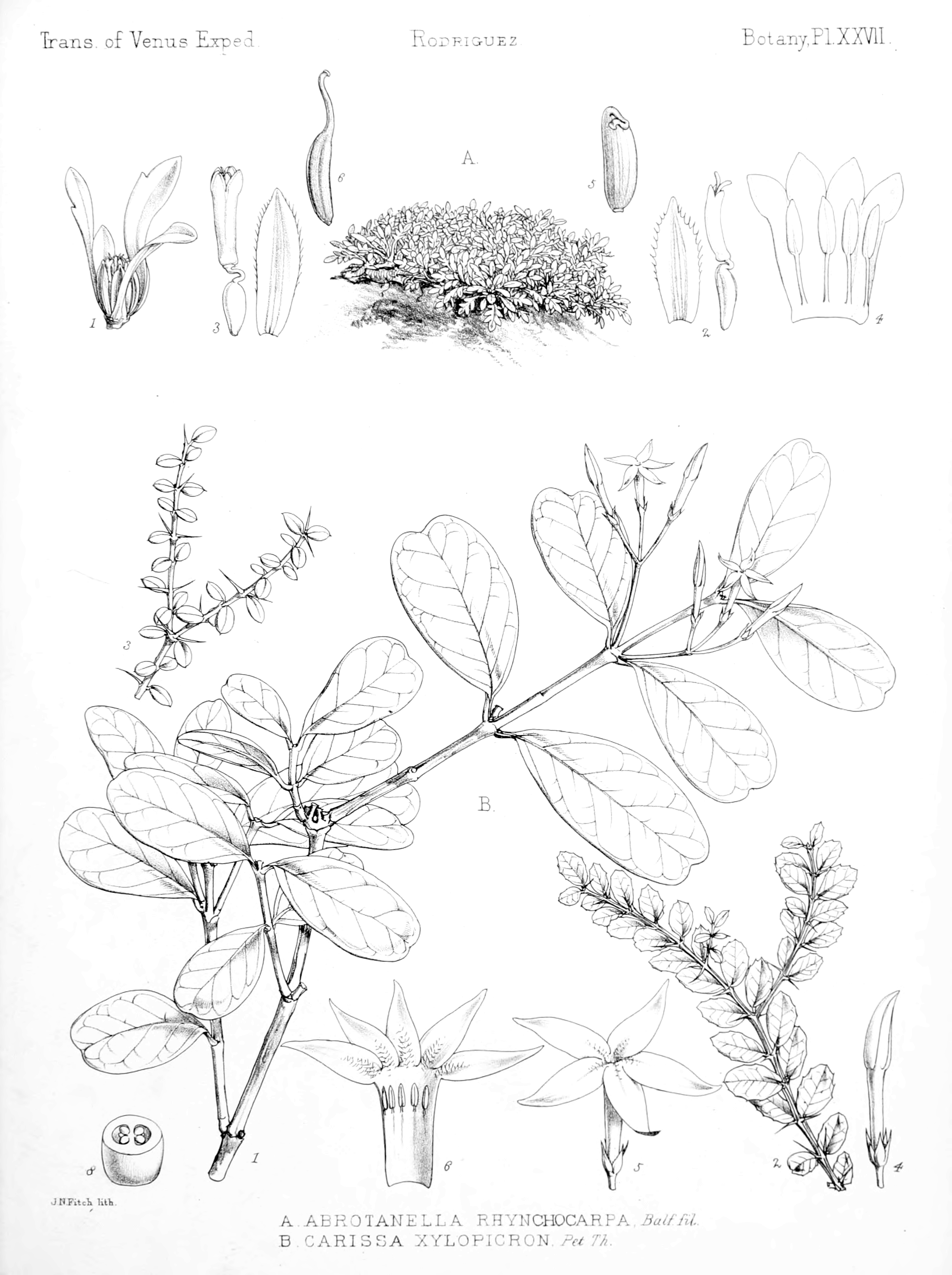
- A. (top): Abrotanella rhynchocarpa, Balf fil. = Rhamphogyne rhynchocarpa B. (bottom): Carissa xylopicron, Pet. Th. = Carissa spinarum

Scientific classification
- Kingdom: Plantae
- Clade: Tracheophytes
- Clade: Angiosperms
- Clade: Eudicots
- Clade: Asterids
- Order: Asterales
- Family: Asteraceae
- Subfamily: Asteroideae
- Tribe: Astereae
- Subtribe: Grangeinae
- Genus: Rhamphogyne; S.Moore
- Species: R. rhynchocarpa

Binomial name
- Rhamphogyne rhynchocarpa (Balf.f.) S.Moore

Synonyms
- Abrotanella rhynchocarpa Balf.f.

= Rhamphogyne =

Species of plant

Rhamphogyne is a genus of plants in the tribe Astereae within the family Asteraceae.

This genus resembles plants from the related ragwort tribe (Senecioneae) in some respects.

Species

The only known species is Rhamphogyne rhynchocarpa, native to Rodrigues Island in the Indian Ocean, part of the Republic of Mauritius.

formerly included

see Lagenocypsela

- Rhamphogyne papuana J.Kost. - Lagenocypsela papuana (J.Kost.) Swenson & K.Bremer
