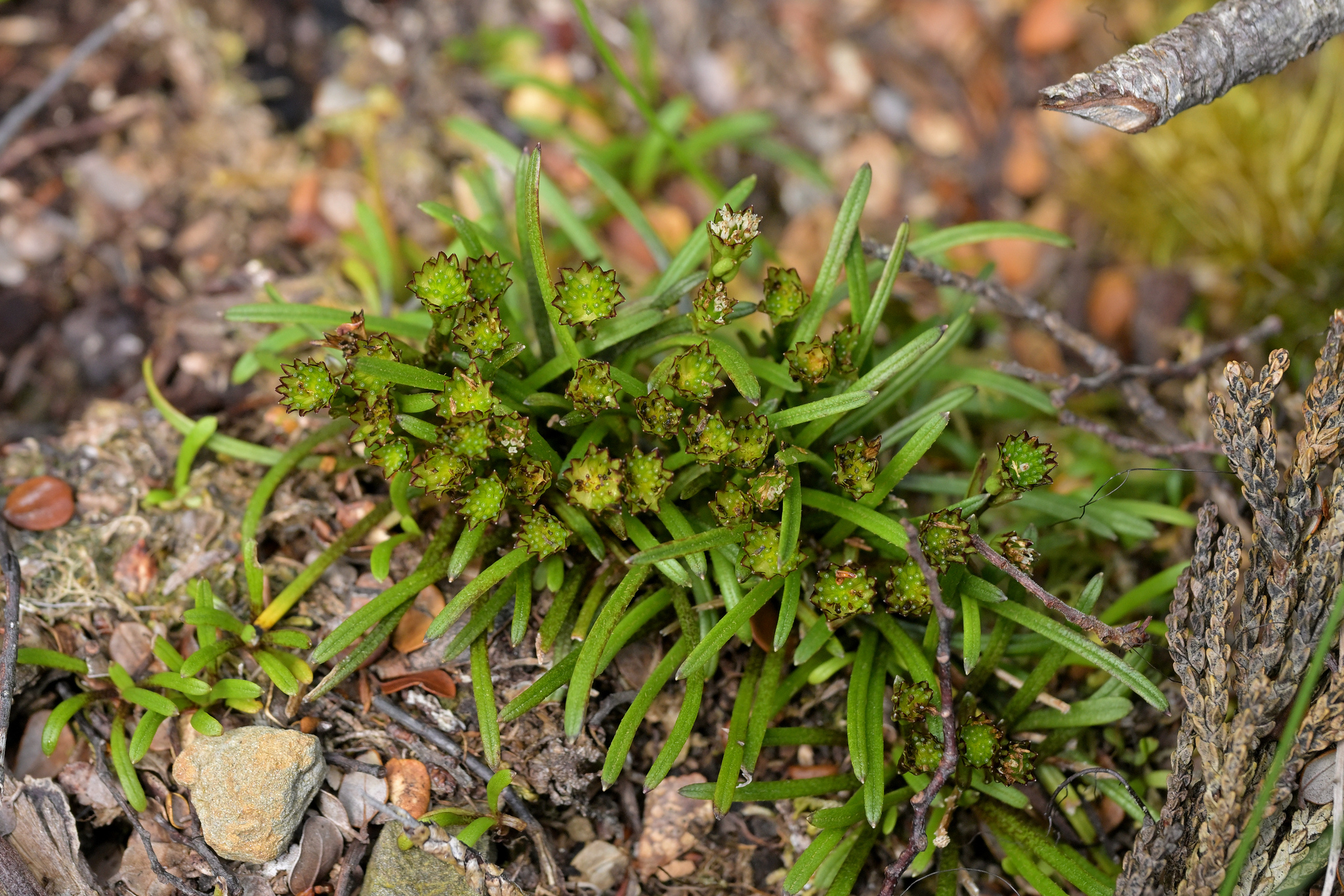

Conservation status
- Not Threatened (NZ TCS)

Scientific classification
- Kingdom: Plantae
- Clade: Tracheophytes
- Clade: Angiosperms
- Clade: Eudicots
- Clade: Asterids
- Order: Asterales
- Family: Asteraceae
- Genus: Abrotanella
- Species: A. linearis

Binomial name
- Abrotanella linearis Berggr.

Synonyms
- Abrotanella filiformis Petrie; Abrotanella linearis var. apiculata Simpson & Thomson

= Abrotanella linearis =

Species of plant

Abrotanella linearis is a species of flowering plant in the daisy family (Asteraceae) and is native to Stewart Island and the South Island of New Zealand. Swedish botanist Sven Berggren described the species in 1878. Plants of this species are small with linear leaves and white florets.

== Taxonomy ==
Abrotanella linearis Berggr. is a plant endemic to New Zealand in the family Asteraceae. It was described in 1878 by Swedish botanist Sven Berggren.

The type material was collected by Berggren at Kelly's Hill in Westland, New Zealand. The lectotype was designated by Ulf Swenson and is held at the Lund University herbarium (Herbarium LD), with isolectotypes at other herbaria.

The specific epithet, linearis, refers to the linear shape of the leaves.

The chromosome number is 2n=18.

== Phylogeny ==
Abrotanella linearis was included in phylogenetic analyses of standard DNA sequencing markers (nuclear ribosomal DNA and chloroplast DNA regions). It was placed within a monophyletic Abrotanella genus in a highly-supported clade comprising species from New Zealand, Australia and New Guinea.

== Distribution and habitat ==
Abrotanella linearis is endemic to New Zealand. It is common in montane forests and subalpine grasslands from 700-1400 m above sea level on the South Island, and from 250-670 m on Stewart Island. It flowers from September to February.

== Conservation status ==
A. linearis was listed as Not Threatened on the most recent assessment (2023-2024) of the New Zealand Threatened Classification for plants.
