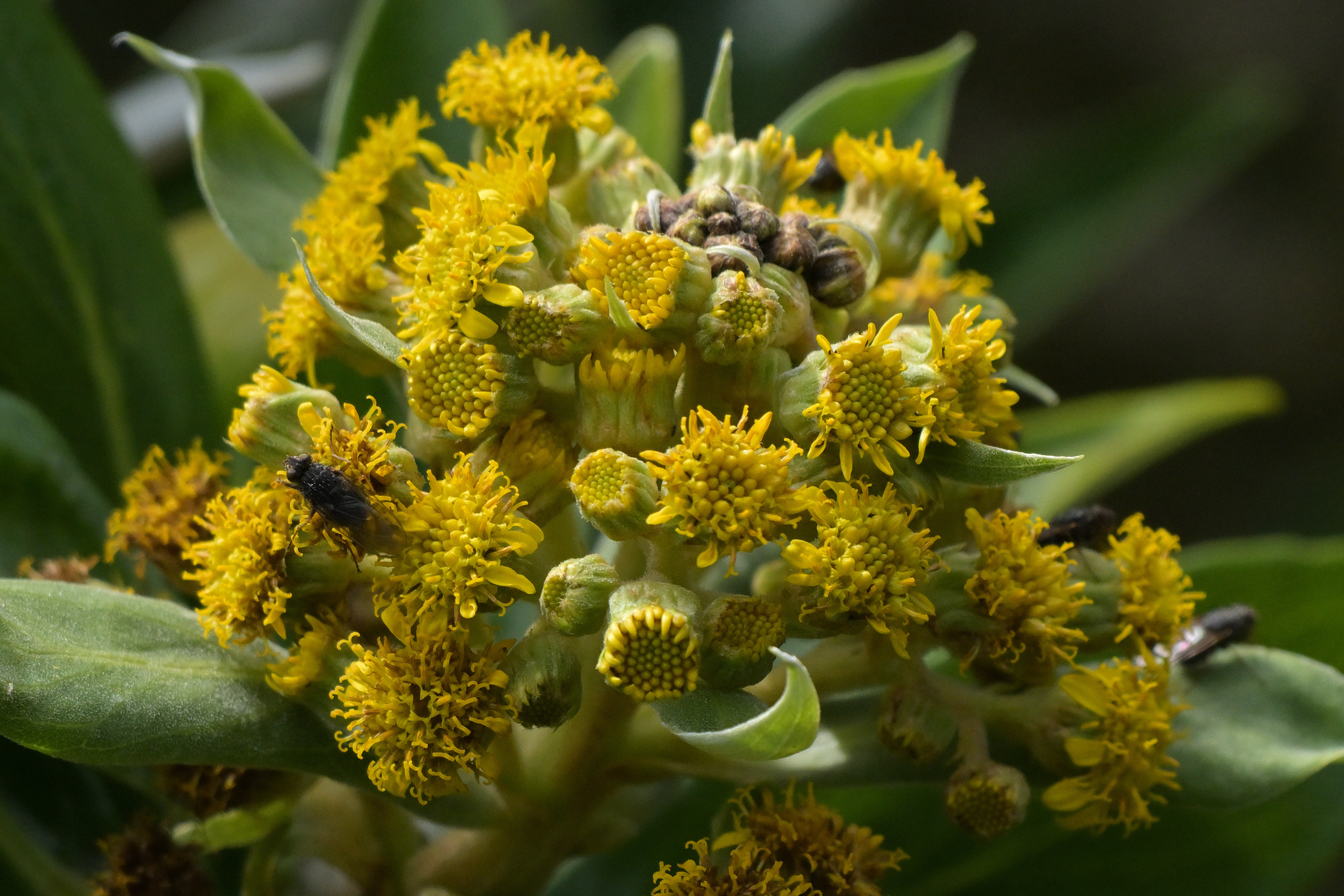
- Flowering plant from Stewart Island

Conservation status
- Naturally Uncommon (NZ TCS)

Scientific classification
- Kingdom: Plantae
- Clade: Tracheophytes
- Clade: Angiosperms
- Clade: Eudicots
- Clade: Asterids
- Order: Asterales
- Family: Asteraceae
- Genus: Brachyglottis
- Species: B. stewartiae

Binomial name
- Brachyglottis stewartiae (J.B.Armstr.) B.Nord.

Synonyms
- Senecio muelleri Kirk; Senecio stewartiae J.B.Armstr.

= Brachyglottis stewartiae =

Species of flowering plant

Brachyglottis stewartiae or Stewart Island Tree Groundsel is a species of flowering plant, often referred to as a tree daisy, in the family Asteraceae. It is found only in New Zealand, especially on Rakiura Stewart Island and some nearby islands, including Snares Islands. Together with another tree daisy, Macrolearia lyallii, it is common in the forest of the Snares Islands, growing to about 6 m in height. It bears conspicuous clusters of yellow daisy-like flowers.

== Taxonomy ==
The species was originally described as Senecio stewartiae by New Zealand botanist Joseph Beattie Armstrong in 1881. It was later transferred to the genus Brachyglottis by Bertil Nordenstam in 1978. The species epithet stewartiae refers to the type location of the species (Stewart Island). The type specimen was collected by James West Stack.

When it was first described, Armstrong noted that it was probably most similar morphologically to the Chatham Island species, Brachyglottis huntii. Indeed, these two species were found to be very closely related genetically in a phylogenetic study using the standard nuclear ribosomal DNA internal transcribed spacer (ITS) region. The same study used a molecular dating method to determine the two species diverged between 0.016 and 2.18 million years ago, and their next closest relative is the South Island species, B. cassinioides.

== Distribution ==
Brachyglottis stewartiae is endemic to New Zealand. It is found on Stewart Island and nearby Herekopare Island, as well as Snares Islands and Solander Islands.

== Conservation status ==
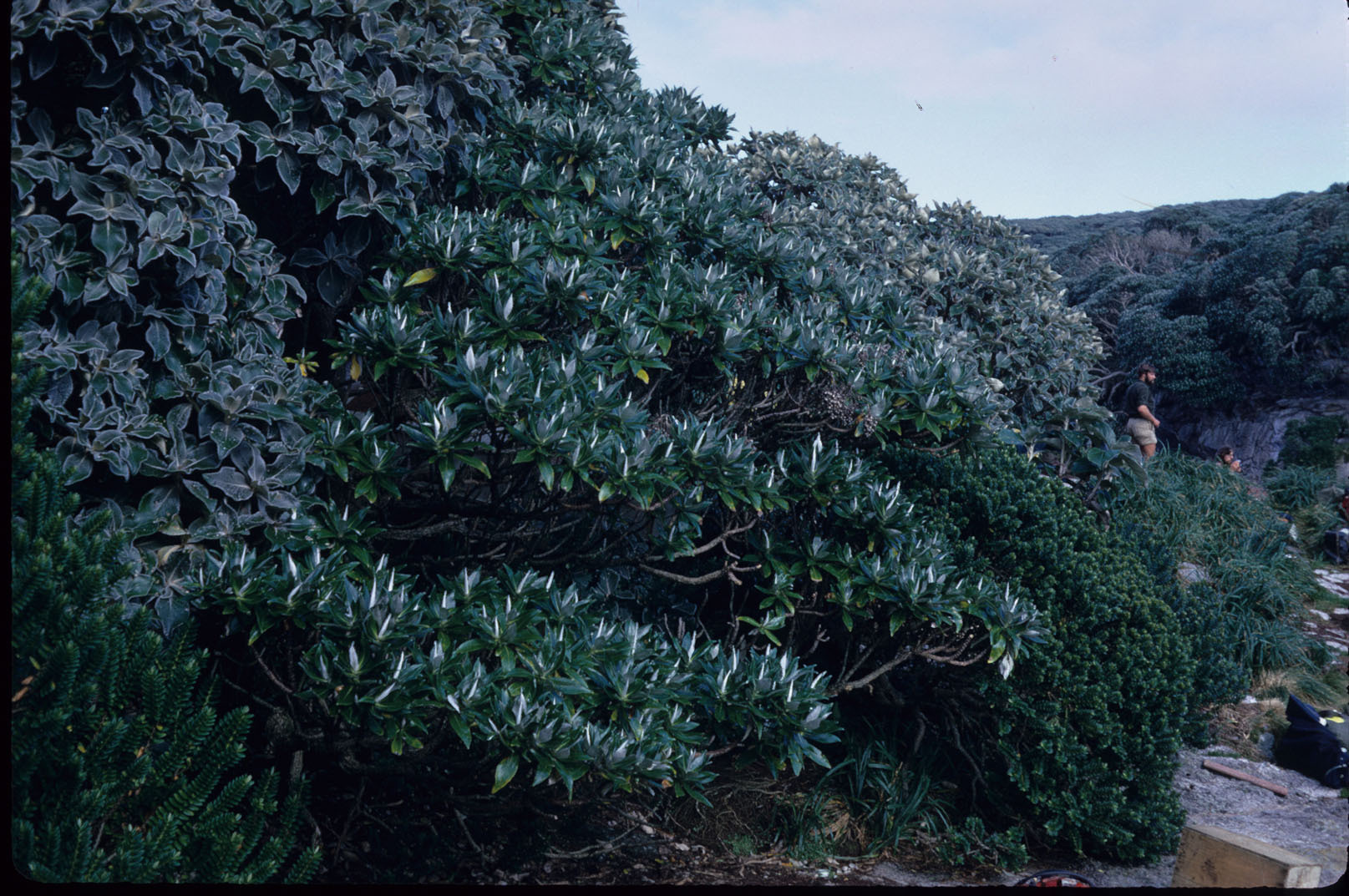
Flowering plant from Stewart Island

B. stewartiae was classified as being At Risk - Naturally Uncommon in the latest New Zealand threatened classification.
