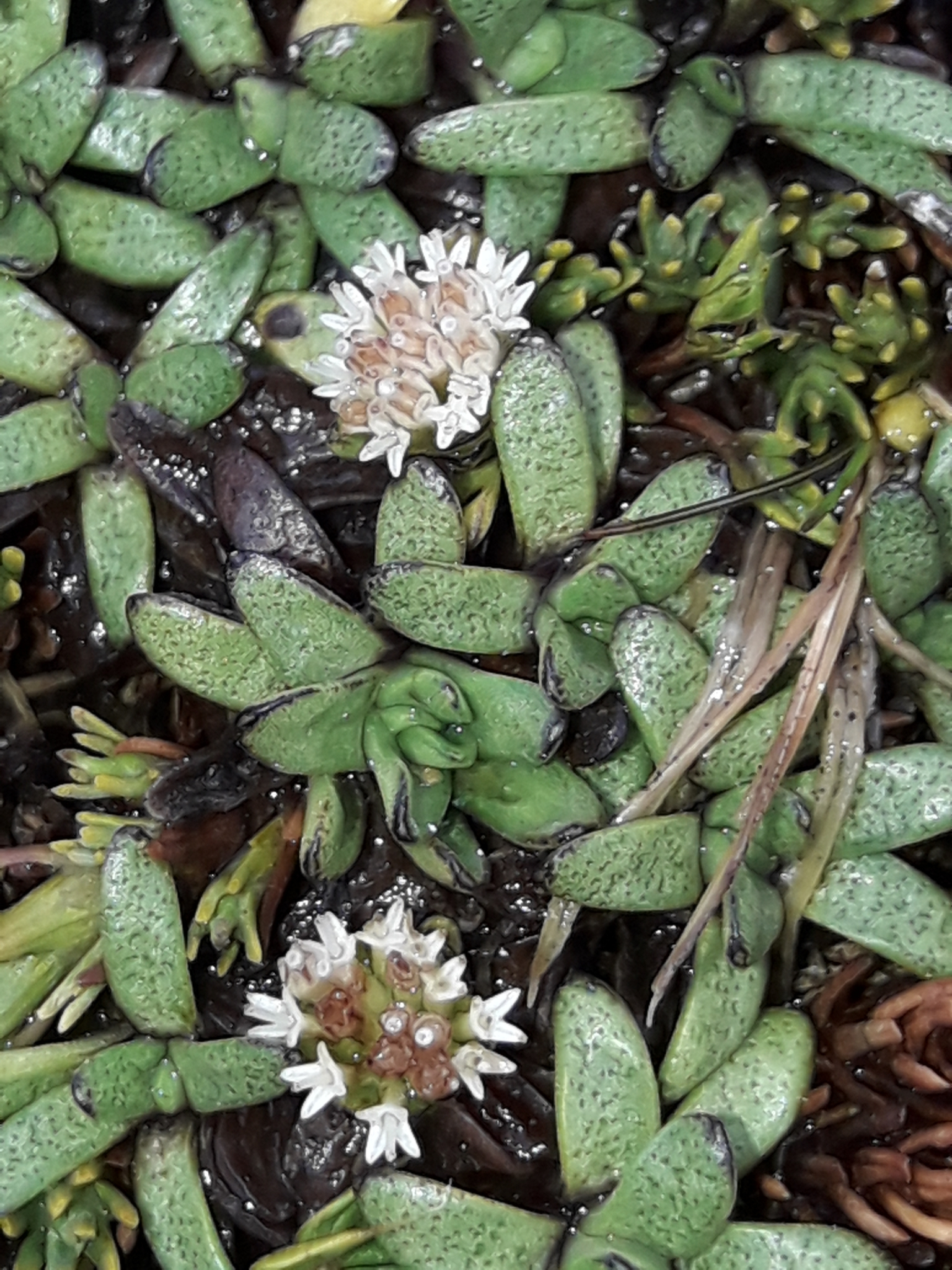

Scientific classification
- Kingdom: Plantae
- Clade: Tracheophytes
- Clade: Angiosperms
- Clade: Eudicots
- Clade: Asterids
- Order: Asterales
- Family: Asteraceae
- Genus: Abrotanella
- Species: A. patearoa

Binomial name
- Abrotanella patearoa Heads

= Abrotanella patearoa =

Species of plant

Abrotanella patearoa is a species of flowering plant in the family Asteraceae. The species is endemic to the Rock and Pillar Range in the South Island of New Zealand.
