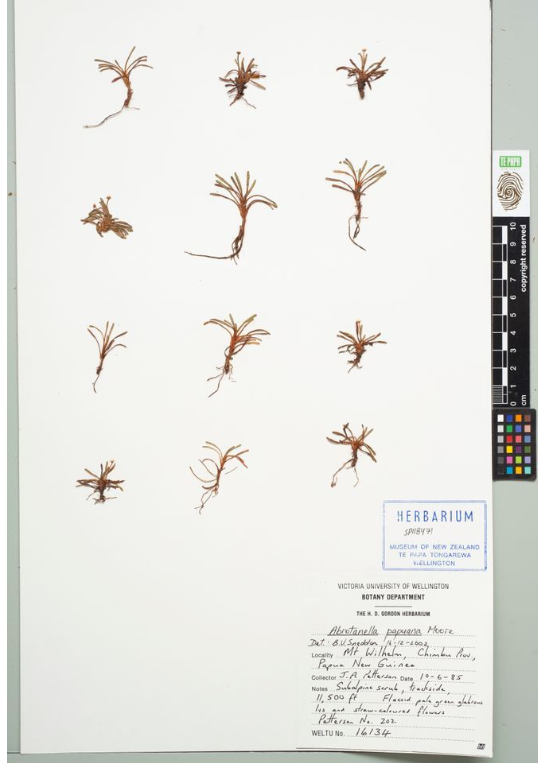
- specimen from Chimbu Province, Mount Wilhelm

Scientific classification
- Kingdom: Plantae
- Clade: Tracheophytes
- Clade: Angiosperms
- Clade: Eudicots
- Clade: Asterids
- Order: Asterales
- Family: Asteraceae
- Genus: Abrotanella
- Species: A. papuana

Binomial name
- Abrotanella papuana S.Moore

= Abrotanella papuana =

Species of plant

Abrotanella papuana is a member of the daisy family and is endemic to New Guinea.
