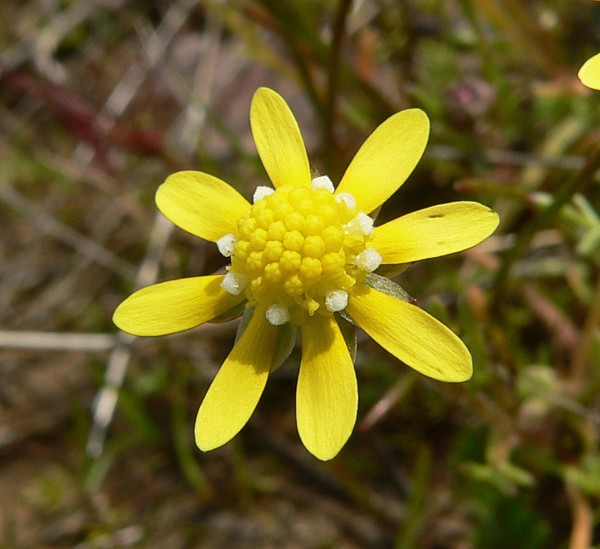
- Blennosperma nanum

Scientific classification
- Kingdom: Plantae
- Clade: Tracheophytes
- Clade: Angiosperms
- Clade: Eudicots
- Clade: Asterids
- Order: Asterales
- Family: Asteraceae
- Subfamily: Asteroideae
- Tribe: Senecioneae
- Genus: Blennosperma; Less.

Synonyms
- Apalus DC.; Coniothele DC.

= Blennosperma =

Stickyseeds

Genus of flowering plants

Blennosperma is a genus of plants in the sunflower family. They are known commonly as stickyseeds; the name Blennosperma is Greek for "slimy seed."

Species

- Blennosperma bakeri - Baker's stickyseed - California
- Blennosperma chilense - Chilean stickyseed - Chile (Provinces of Maule, O'Higgins, Valparaíso)
- Blennosperma cretacea - southern Venezuela, northwestern Brazil
- Blennosperma nanum - glueseed - California
