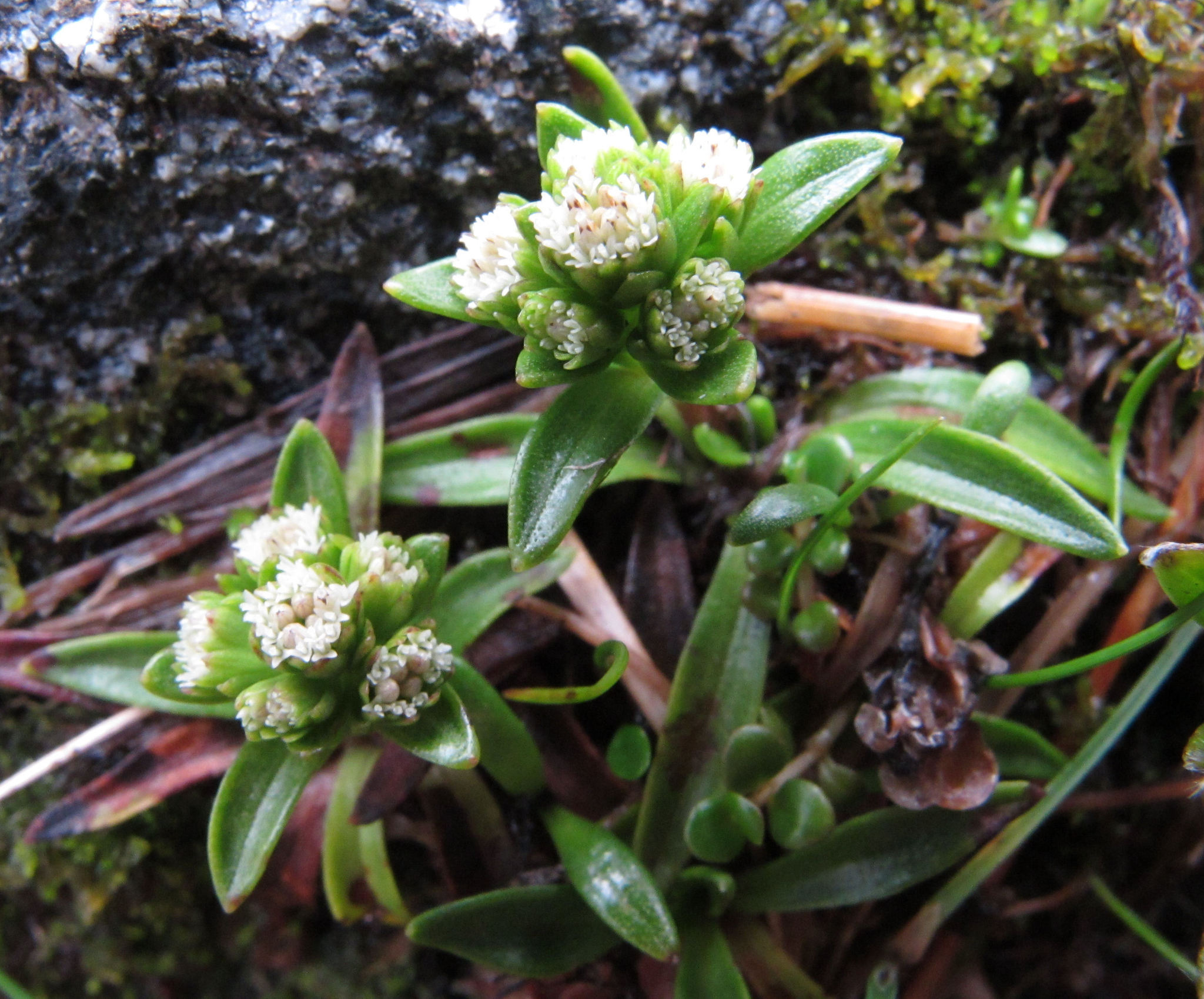

Scientific classification
- Kingdom: Plantae
- Clade: Embryophytes
- Clade: Tracheophytes
- Clade: Angiosperms
- Clade: Eudicots
- Clade: Asterids
- Order: Asterales
- Family: Asteraceae
- Genus: Abrotanella
- Species: A. rostrata

Binomial name
- Abrotanella rostrata Swenson

= Abrotanella rostrata =

Species of flowering plant

Abrotanella rostrata is a species of cushion plant belonging to the family Asteraceae. This tiny plant, only reaching 5 cm in height, is restricted to rocky places in the high mountains of southern South Island, New Zealand. It can be distinguished from its congeners by the combination of white florets and distinctively beaked cypselae. It flowers in December and January.

This plant is considered threatened due to its limited range.
