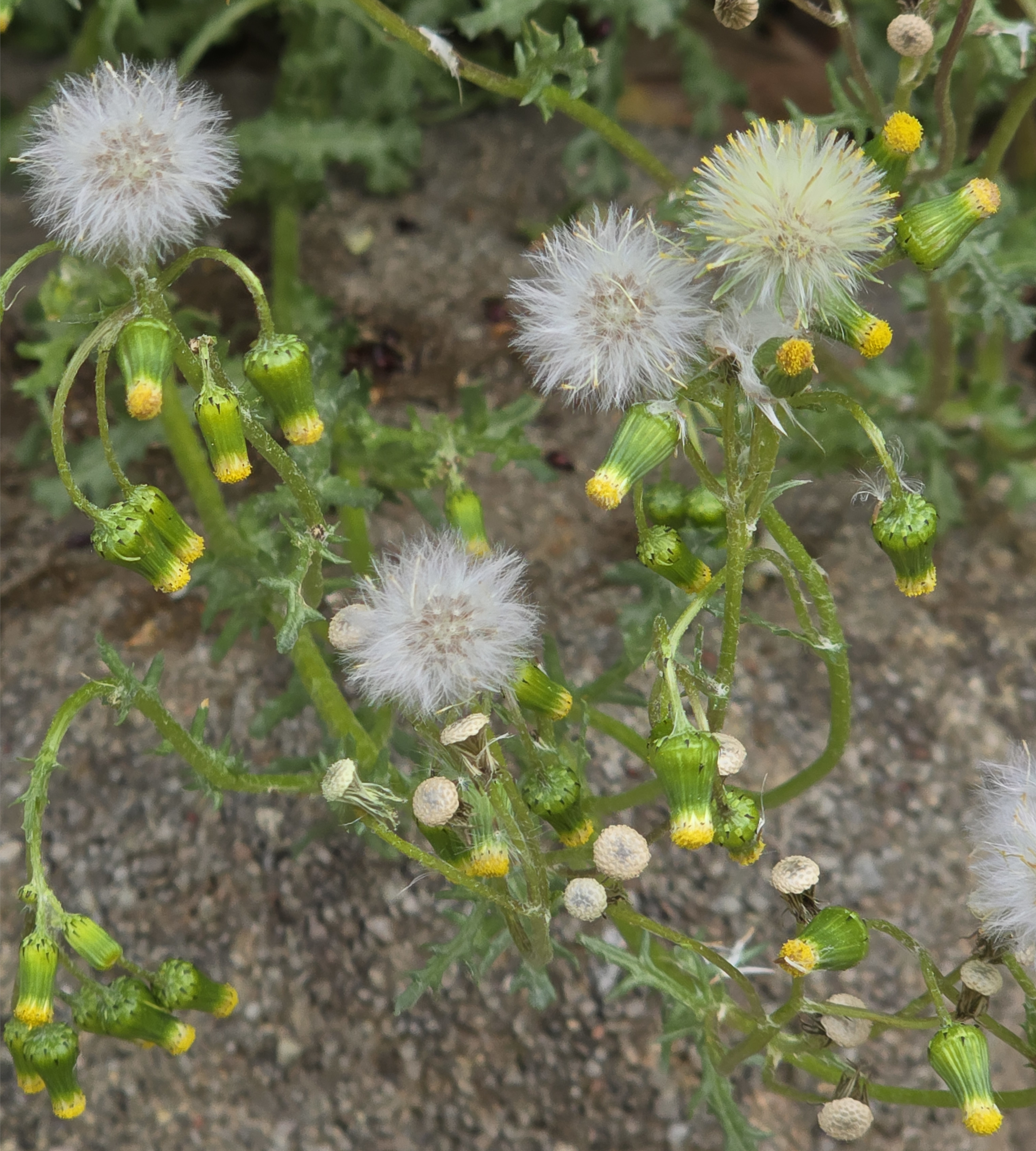
- Senecio vulgaris at Neuendettelsau, Nuremberg, Germany

Scientific classification
- Kingdom: Plantae
- Clade: Tracheophytes
- Clade: Angiosperms
- Clade: Eudicots
- Clade: Asterids
- Order: Asterales
- Family: Asteraceae
- Subfamily: Asteroideae
- Tribe: Senecioneae
- Genus: Senecio; L.

Type species
- Senecio vulgaris L.

Species
- 1,482; see text

Synonyms
- Synonymy: Acleia DC.; Adenotrichia Lindl.; Anecio Neck.; Aspelina Cass.; Brachypappus Sch.Bip.; Brachyrhynchos Less.; Cadiscus E.Mey. ex DC.; Carderina Cass.; Cladopogon Sch.Bip.; Crociseris (Rchb.) Fourr.; Cryptochaete Raimondi; Erechthites Less.; Eudorus Cass.; Farobaea Schrank ex Colla; Jacobanthus Fourr.; Madacarpus Wight; Madaractis DC.; Melalema Hook.f.; Metazanthus Meyen; Moerkensteinia Opiz; Obaejaca Cass.; Pseudojacobaea (Hook.f.) R.Mathur; Pterosenecio Sch.Bip. ex Baker; Sclerobasis Cass.; Seneciunculus Opiz; Symphipappus Klatt; Synarthrum Cass.

= Senecio =

Genus of flowering plants

Senecio is a genus of flowering plants in the daisy family (Asteraceae) that includes groundsels and some ragworts. Variously circumscribed taxonomically, the genus Senecio is one of the largest genera of flowering plants. Plants of the World Online currently accepts 1,482 species.

== Etymology ==
The genus name Senecio comes from Latin senex 'old man'. The name, as used by Pliny the Elder, refers to the plant’s grey hairiness as soon as fruiting commences.

== Description ==
=== Morphology ===
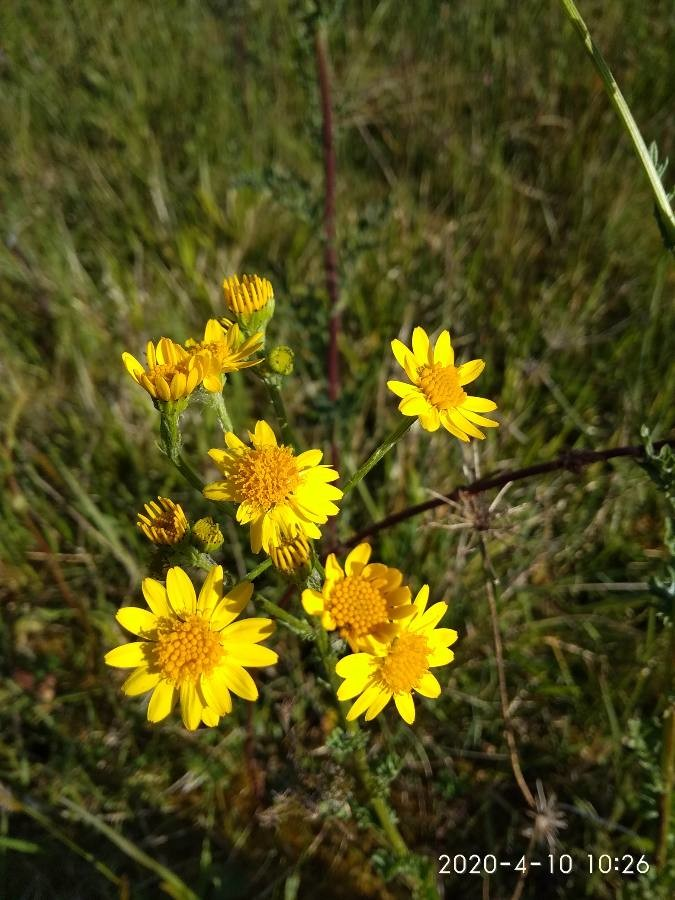
Senecio squalidus flowerheads have the yellow ray florets typical of many species

The flower heads are often rayed (though the type species Senecio vulgaris does not have ray florets), with the heads borne in branched clusters, and usually completely yellow, but green, purple, white and blue flowers are known as well.

In its current circumscription, the genus contains species that are annual or perennial herbs, shrubs, small trees, aquatics or climbers.

=== Chemistry ===
Pyrrolizidine alkaloids are found in all Senecio species. These alkaloids serve as a natural biocides to deter or even kill animals that would eat them. Livestock generally do not find them palatable. Senecio species are used as food plants by the larvae of some Lepidoptera species that have developed tolerance for these alkaloids.

== Taxonomy ==
The traditional circumscription of Senecio is artificial, being polyphyletic, even in its new circumscription which is based on genetic data. Despite the separation of many species into other genera, the genus still contains c. 1,250 species and is one of the largest genera of flowering plants.

As no morphological synapomorphies are known to determine which species belong to the genus or not, no exact species number is known. The genus has an almost worldwide distribution and evolved in the mid- to late Miocene.

=== Phylogeny ===
As of 2007, many genera and the whole tribe were in need of revision. Many species currently placed in the genus need to be transferred to other or new genera, and others have been retransferred to Senecio. In its new delimitation the genus is still not monophyletic.

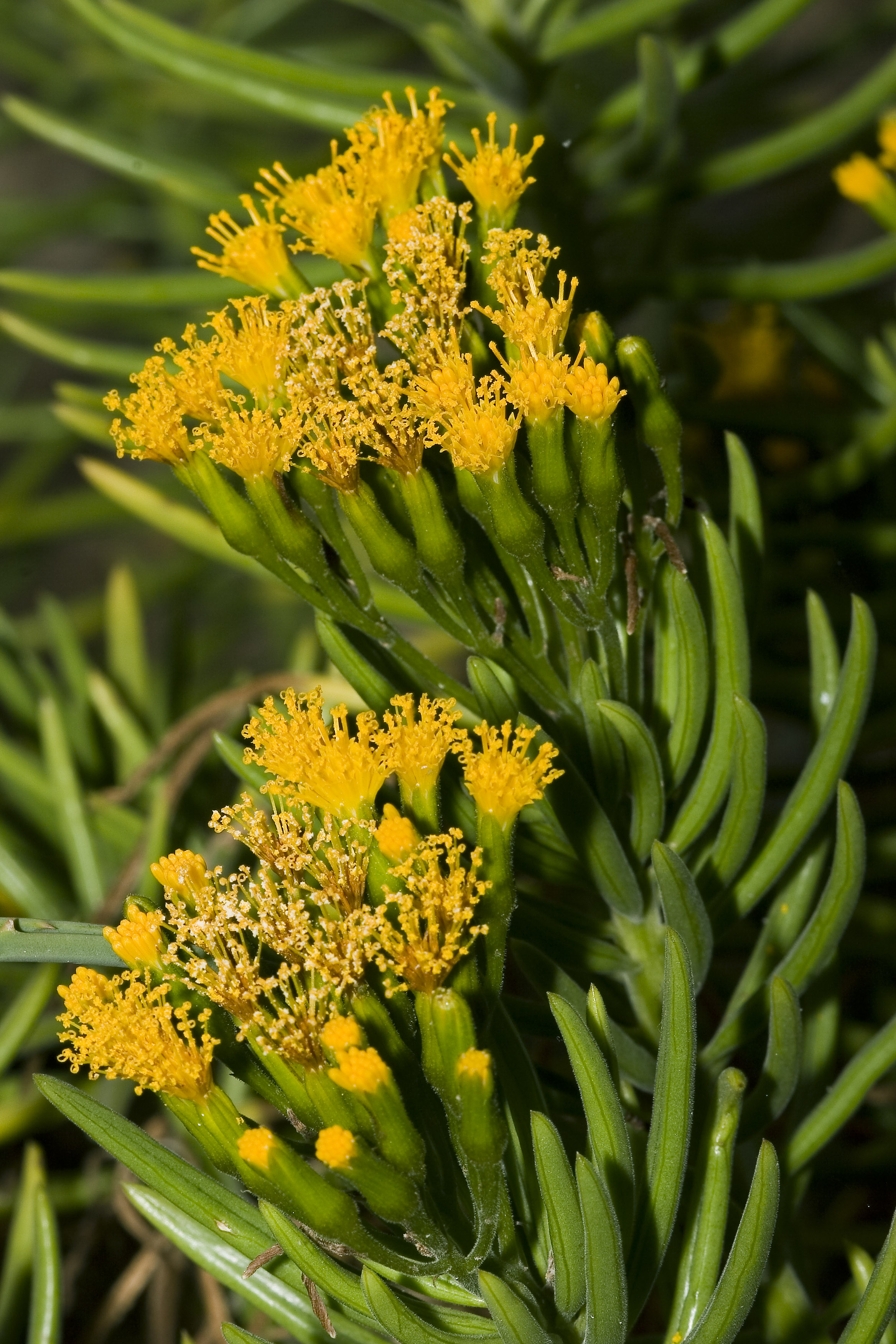
S. barbertonicus Succulent Bush Senecio

The following genera are currently accepted by Plants of the World Online, and contain species that are or have been included within Senecio.

- Aetheolaena Cass.
- Antillanthus B.Nord.
- Barkleyanthus H.Rob. & Brettell
- Bethencourtia Choisy (synonym Canariothamnus B.Nord.)
- Brachyglottis J.R.Forst. & G.Forst.
- Curio P.V.Heath
- Dauresia B.Nord. & Pelser
- Dendrophorbium C.Jeffrey
- Dendrosenecio (Hauman ex Hedberg) B.Nord. - Giant groundsels native to high-elevation areas of East Africa
- Dorobaea Cass.
- Dresslerothamnus H.Rob.
- Elekmania B.Nord.
- Hasteola Raf.
- Herreranthus B.Nord.
- Hubertia Bory
- Iocenes B.Nord.
- Jacobaea Mill.
- Leonis B.Nord.
- Ligularia Cass.
- Lundinia B.Nord.
- Mesogramma DC.
- Monticalia C.Jeffrey
- Nelsonianthus H.Rob. & Brettell
- Nesampelos B.Nord., nom. inval.
- Oldfeltia B.Nord. & Lundin
- Packera Á.Löve & D.Löve
- Pentacalia Cass.
- Pippenalia McVaugh
- Pittocaulon H.Rob. & Brettell
- Pojarkovia Askerova
- Psacaliopsis H.Rob. & Brettell
- Pseudogynoxys (Greenm.) Cabrera
- Robinsonia DC. (synonym Vendredia Baill.)
- Roldana La Llave
- Sinosenecio B.Nord.
- Synotis (C.B.Clarke) C.Jeffrey & Y.L.Chen
- Telanthophora H.Rob. & Brettell
- Tephroseris (Rchb.) Rchb.
- Zemisia B.Nord.

=== Selected species ===
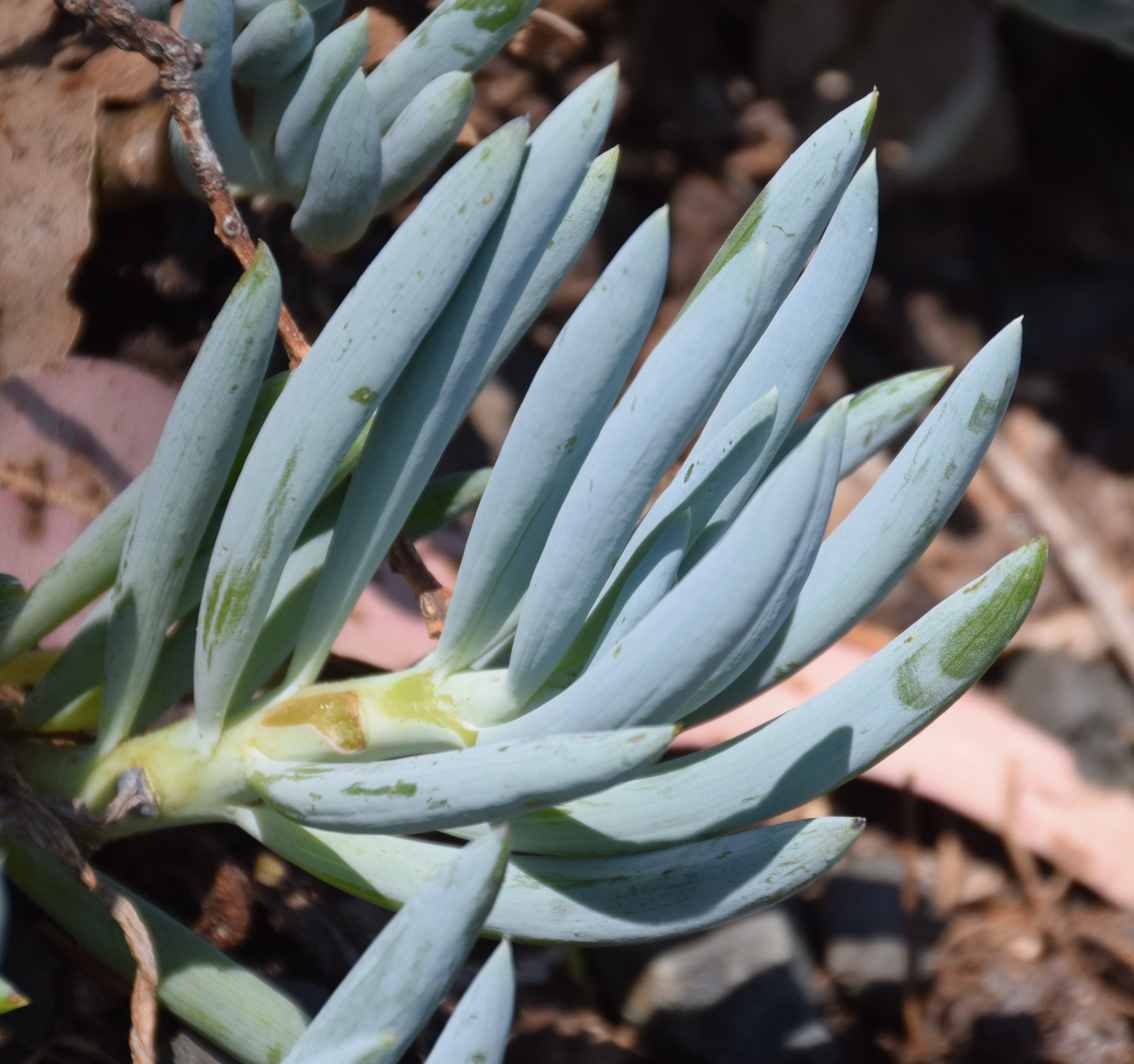
Some of the popular succulent species that were formerly included within Senecio, such as Senecio serpens (pictured) and Senecio rowleyanus, are now placed in the genus Curio.

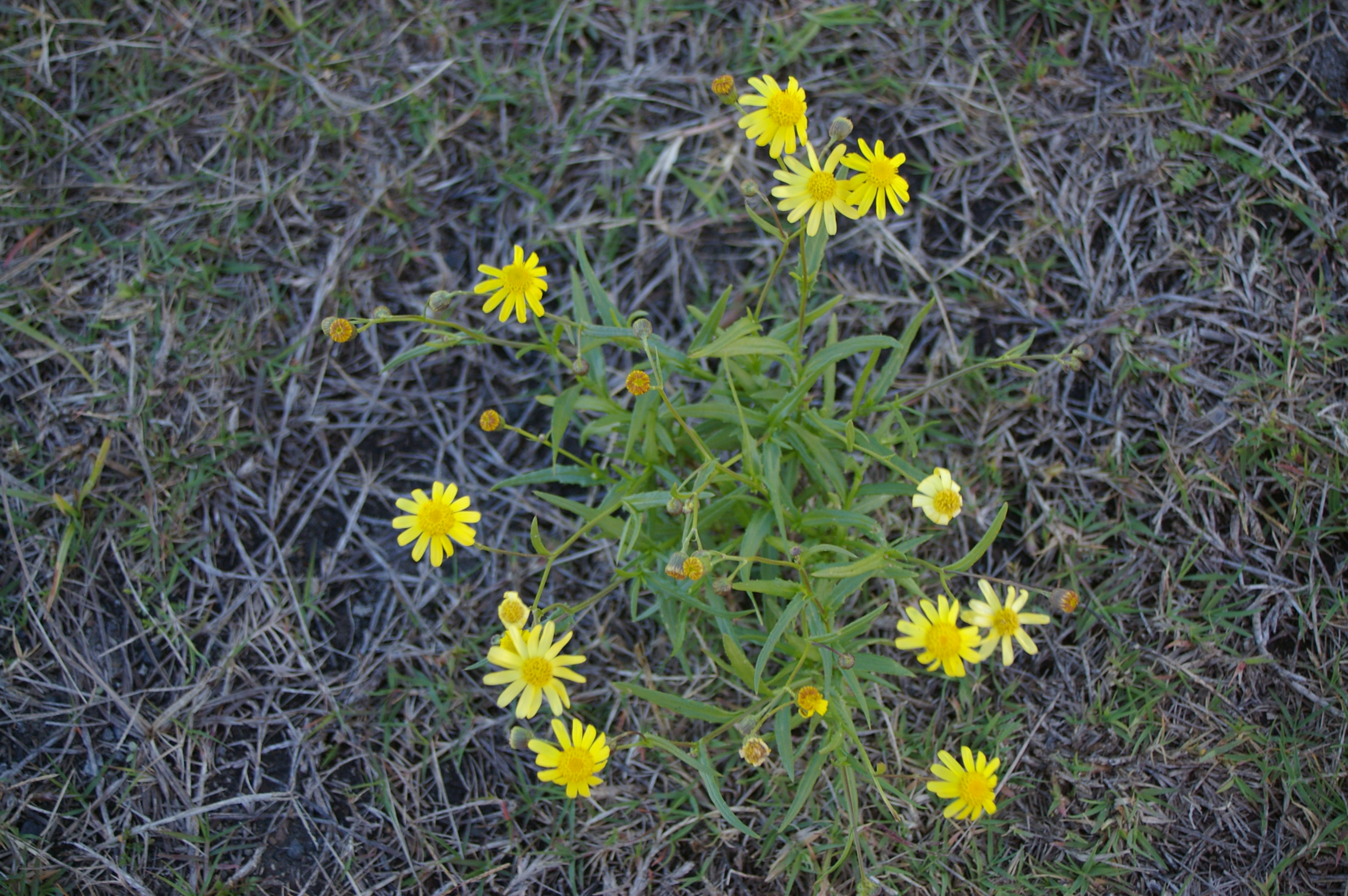
Senecio madagascariensis, Fireweed

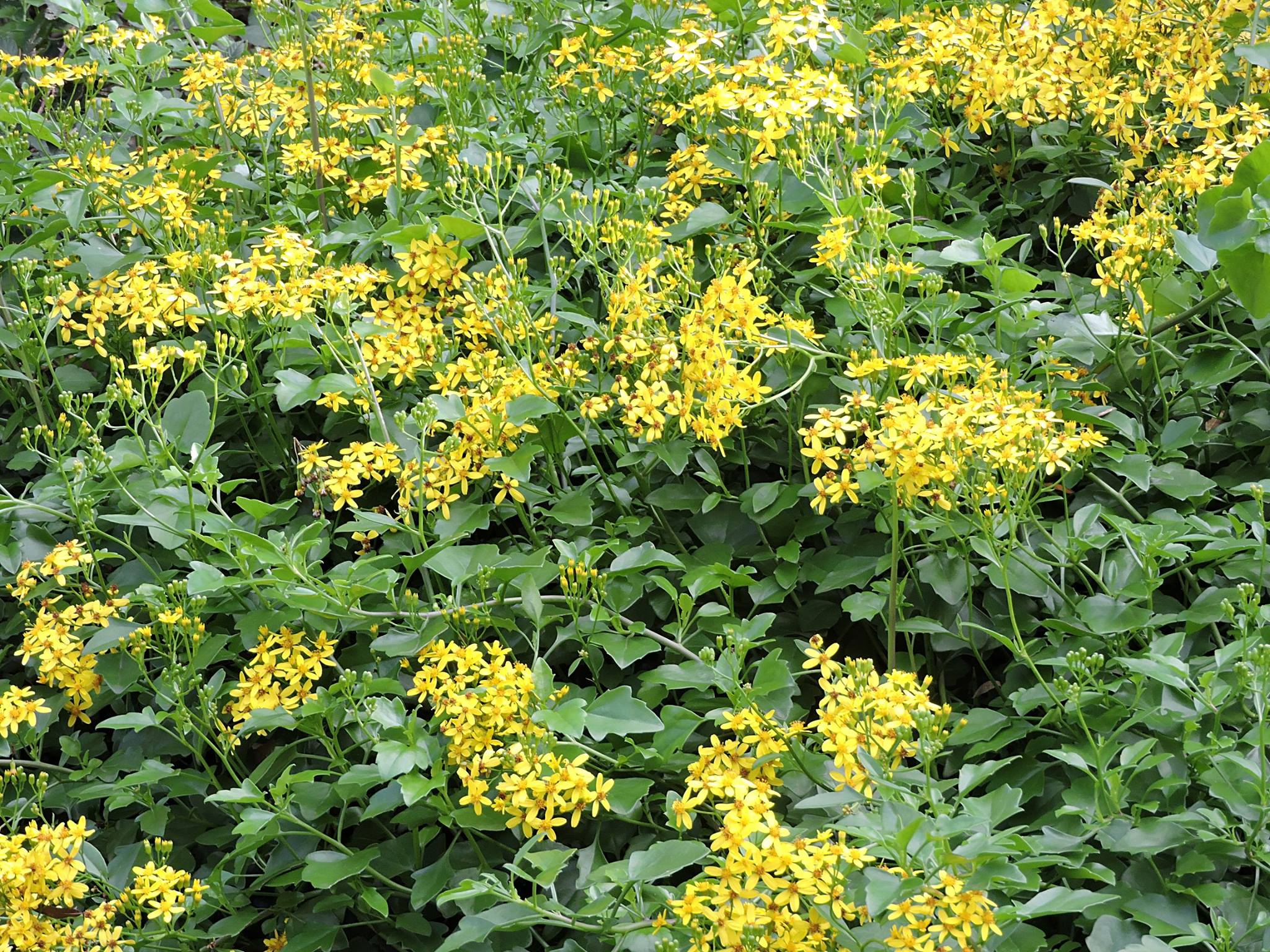
Senecio angulatus, Cape Ivy

- Senecio ampullaceus Hook. — Texas ragwort, Texas squaw-weed, Texas groundsel, clasping-leaf groundsel
- Senecio angulatus L.f. — creeping groundsel
- Senecio antisanae Benth.
- Senecio arborescens
- Senecio barbertonicus Klatt — succulent bush senecio
- Senecio bigelovii A.Gray — nodding groundsel
- Senecio brasiliensis (Spreng.) Less. — flor-das-almas
- Senecio cambrensis Rosser — Welsh groundsel, Welsh ragwort
- Senecio candicans Wall. ex DC. — angel wings
- Senecio casapaltensis Ball (synonym Senecio sanmarcosensis H.Beltrán)
- Senecio crassissimus Humbert
- Senecio decaryi Humbert — Madagascar senecio
- Senecio elegans L. — purple groundsel
- Senecio falklandicus Hook.f.
- Senecio flaccidus Less. — Douglas senecio, threadleaf groundsel, threadleaf ragwort
- Senecio gallicus Vill. ex Chaix — French groundsel
- Senecio glaucus L. — Jaffa groundsel
- Senecio howeanus Belcher
- Senecio inaequidens DC. — South African ragwort
- Senecio iscoensis Hieron.
- Senecio keniophytum R.E.Fr.
- Senecio lamarckianus Bullock
- Senecio leucanthemifolius Poir. — coastal ragwort
- Senecio macroglossus DC. — Natal ivy, wax ivy
- Senecio madagascariensis Poir. — Madagascar ragwort
- Senecio neowbsteri S.F.Blake – Olympic Mountain groundsel
- Senecio oxyriifolius DC. (synonym Senecio tropaeolifolius) — false nasturtium
- Senecio patagonicus Hook. & Arn.
- Senecio pauciradiatus Belcher
- Senecio pokohinuensis (de Lange & B.G.Murray) de Lange — Mokohinau groundsel
- Senecio pulcher Hook. & Arn.
- Senecio scandens Buch.-Ham. ex D.Don — climbing Senecio
- Senecio squalidus L. — Oxford ragwort
- Senecio triangularis Hook. — arrowleaf groundsel
- Senecio vaginatus Hook. & Arn.
- Senecio vernalis Waldst. & Kit. — eastern groundsel
- Senecio viscosus L. — sticky ragwort
- Senecio vulgaris L. — common groundsel, old-man-in-the-spring

Formerly in Senecio (partial list)

- Brachyglottis greyi (as S. greyi)
- Jacobaea vulgaris (common ragwort; as S. jacobaea)
- Pericallis × hybrida (as S. cruentus)
- Rugelia nudicaulis — Rugels ragwort
- Telanthophora grandifolia (Less.) H.Rob. & Brettell (as S. grandifolius Less.)
- Tephroseris papposa (Rchb.) Schur (as S. papposus)

== Distribution ==
The genus Senecio is distributed almost worldwide. It is one of the few genera occurring in all five regions with a Mediterranean climate. Furthermore, species are found in mountainous regions, including tropical alpine-like areas.
