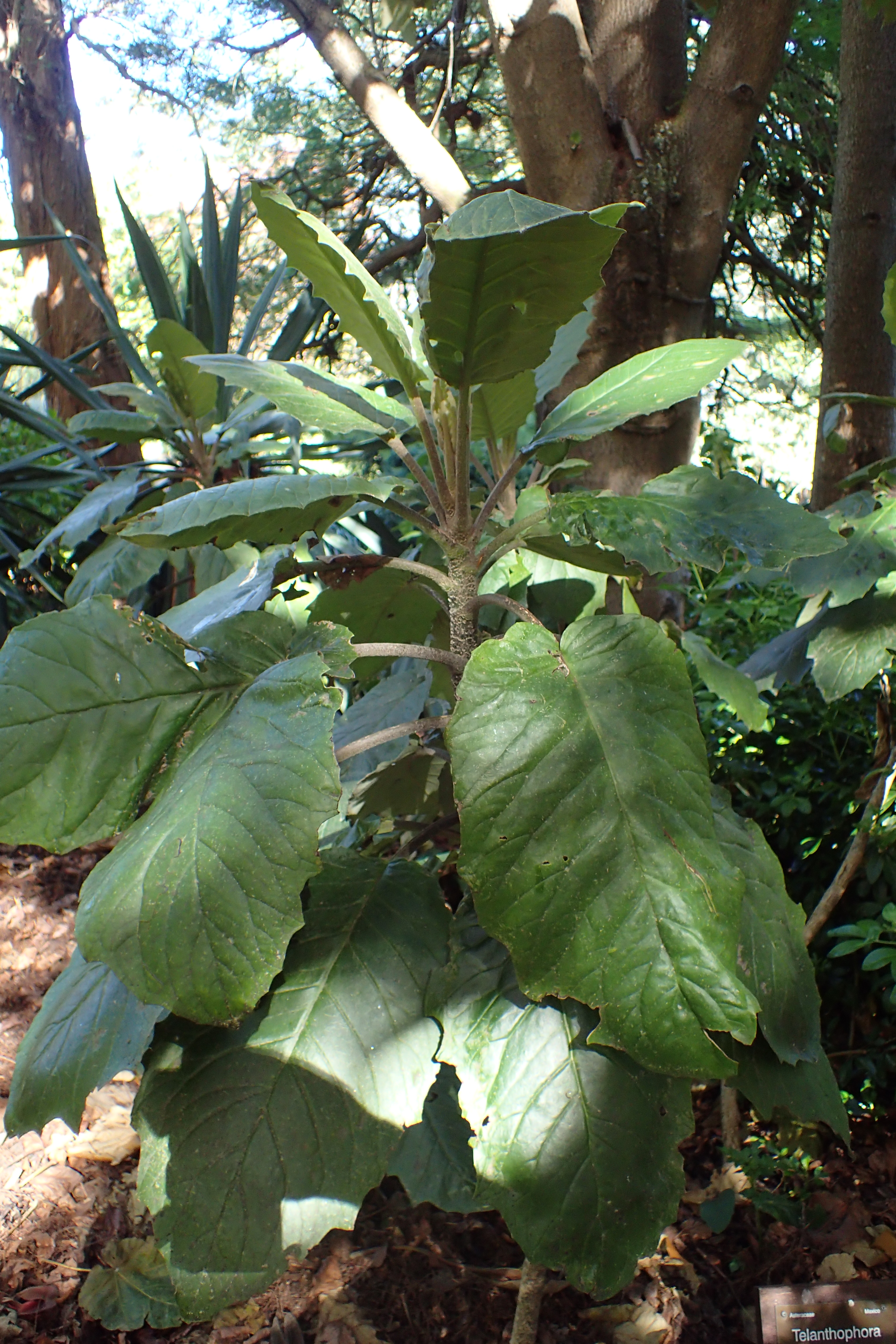
- Telanthophora grandifolia

Scientific classification
- Kingdom: Plantae
- Clade: Tracheophytes
- Clade: Angiosperms
- Clade: Eudicots
- Clade: Asterids
- Order: Asterales
- Family: Asteraceae
- Subfamily: Asteroideae
- Tribe: Senecioneae
- Genus: Telanthophora; H.Rob. & Brettell

Type species
- Senecio arborescens Steetz

= Telanthophora =

Genus of plants

Telanthophora is a genus of Mesoamerican plants in the groundsel tribe within the daisy family.

Species

- Telanthophora arborescens (Steetz) H.Rob. & Brettell - Panamá, El Salvador, Costa Rica, Mexico (Oaxaca, Veracruz)
- Telanthophora bartlettii H.Rob. & Brettell - Belize
- Telanthophora cobanensis (J.M.Coult.) H.Rob. & Brettell - Mexico (Oaxaca, Chiapas), Guatemala, Belize, El Salvador, Honduras, Nicaragua
- Telanthophora grandifolia (Less.) H.Rob. & Brettell - Mexico (Veracruz, Oaxaca, Chiapas), Guatemala, Belize, El Salvador, Honduras, Nicaragua, Costa Rica, Panamá
- Telanthophora serraquitchensis (Greenm.) H.Rob. & Brettell - Mexico (Chiapas), El Salvador

formerly included

see Senecio and Villasenoria

- Telanthophora andrieuxii - Senecio andrieuxii
- Telanthophora molinae - Senecio cobanensis
- Telanthophora orcuttii - Villasenoria orcuttii
- Telanthophora sublaciniatus - Senecio cobanensis
- Telanthophora uspantanensis - Senecio uspantanensis
- Telanthophora cobanensis var. molinae - Senecio cobanensis
