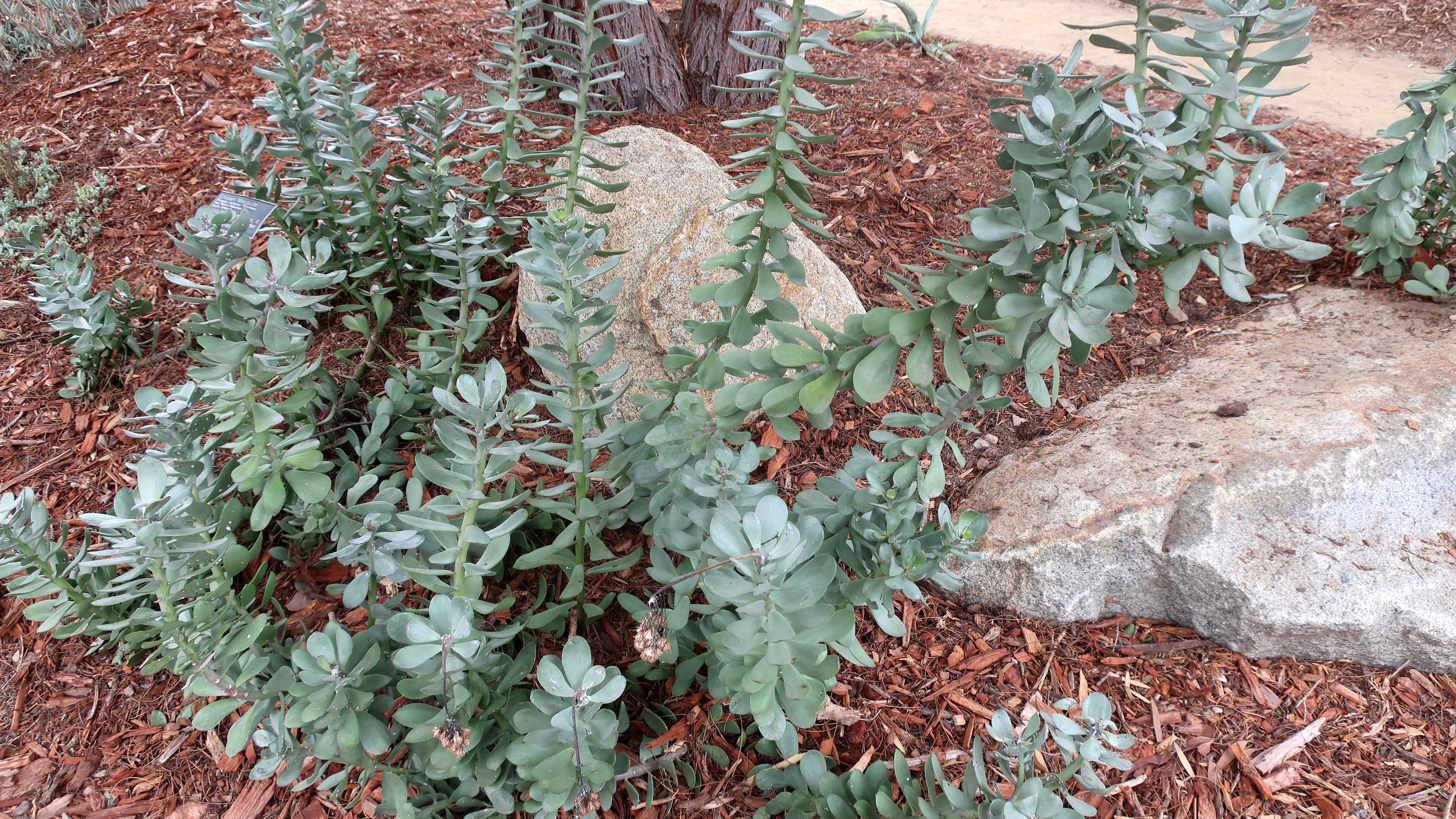

Scientific classification
- Kingdom: Plantae
- Clade: Tracheophytes
- Clade: Angiosperms
- Clade: Eudicots
- Clade: Asterids
- Order: Asterales
- Family: Asteraceae
- Genus: Senecio
- Species: S. decaryi

Binomial name
- Senecio decaryi Humbert

= Senecio decaryi =

Species of flowering plant

Senecio decaryi, also called yellow puffs and Madagascar senecio, is a succulent plant native to Madagascar. Its epithet tributes French botanist and ethnologist Raymond Decary (1891–1973).

== Description ==
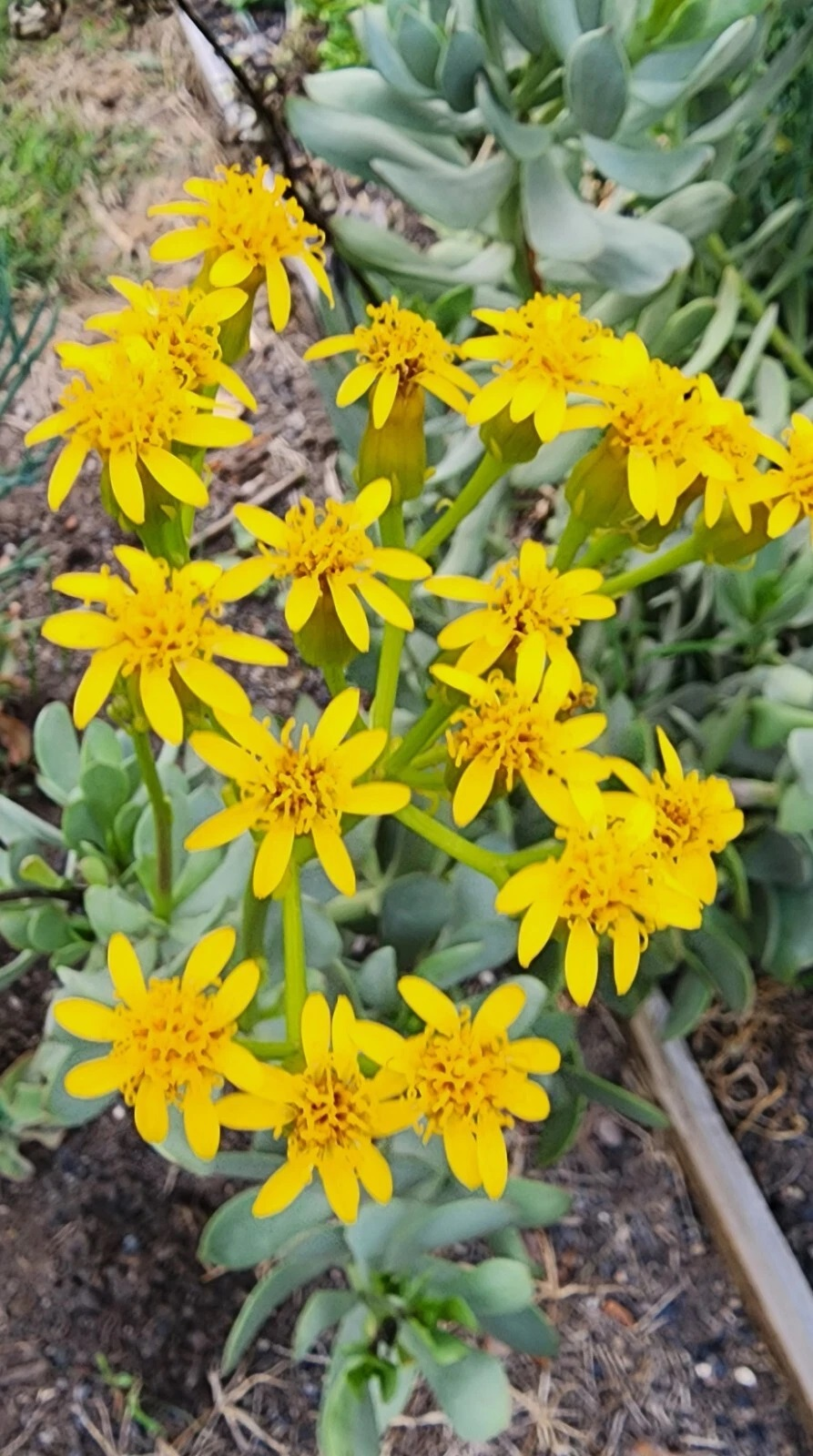
Flowers

It is an upright, meandering, shrubby plant that grows to 1.2 m to 1.5 m (around 4 ft to 5 ft) in height, where it branches at the base and as well as higher up. Having fleshy roots, the spread of the plant frequently surpasses its height.

The succulent leaves are spoon-shaped (oblanceolate) and feature a small point at the tip. The leaves are glossy green and are upright, with their purple-veined backsides being visible. As they age, the leaves become more spread and gray-green in colour, with the veins no longer conspicuous. Mature leaves are up to 7½ cm (3 inches) long or a slightly more longer. Its stem is similar to that of Senecio crassissimus, though its leaves are less stout and wider, with lavender margins.

=== Inflorescence ===
The terminal inflorescences appear from the tips of the branches, where they ascend to a height of up to 25 cm (10 inches) to produce a bouquet of yellow daisy-like, ray flowers that are bright yellow with an orange disc. They are bunched inside a cup called a capitulum and have mildly sweet fragrance. The plant usually flowers during the summer and autumn, and it may have more than one round of flowering within a year. In Australia, it begins to flower in January.

== Habitat ==
The plant is found on rocky outcrops in the south-central, arid areas of Madagascar. Therefore, it prefers dry environments, particularly in winter, although summer rain is beneficial for it. It thrives in sandy soil and cactus mix. The leaves will shed under extremely dry conditions.
