= Senecio sanmarcosensis =

Scientific classification
- Kingdom: Plantae
- Clade: Tracheophytes
- Clade: Angiosperms
- Clade: Eudicots
- Clade: Asterids
- Order: Asterales
- Family: Asteraceae
- Genus: Senecio
- Species: S. sanmarcosensis

Binomial name
- Senecio sanmarcosensis H.Beltrán

Species of flowering plant

Senecio sanmarcosensis is a perennial Senecio native to high elevation wetlands in Polylepis racemosa forests in the Callejón de Huaylas in Peru.
