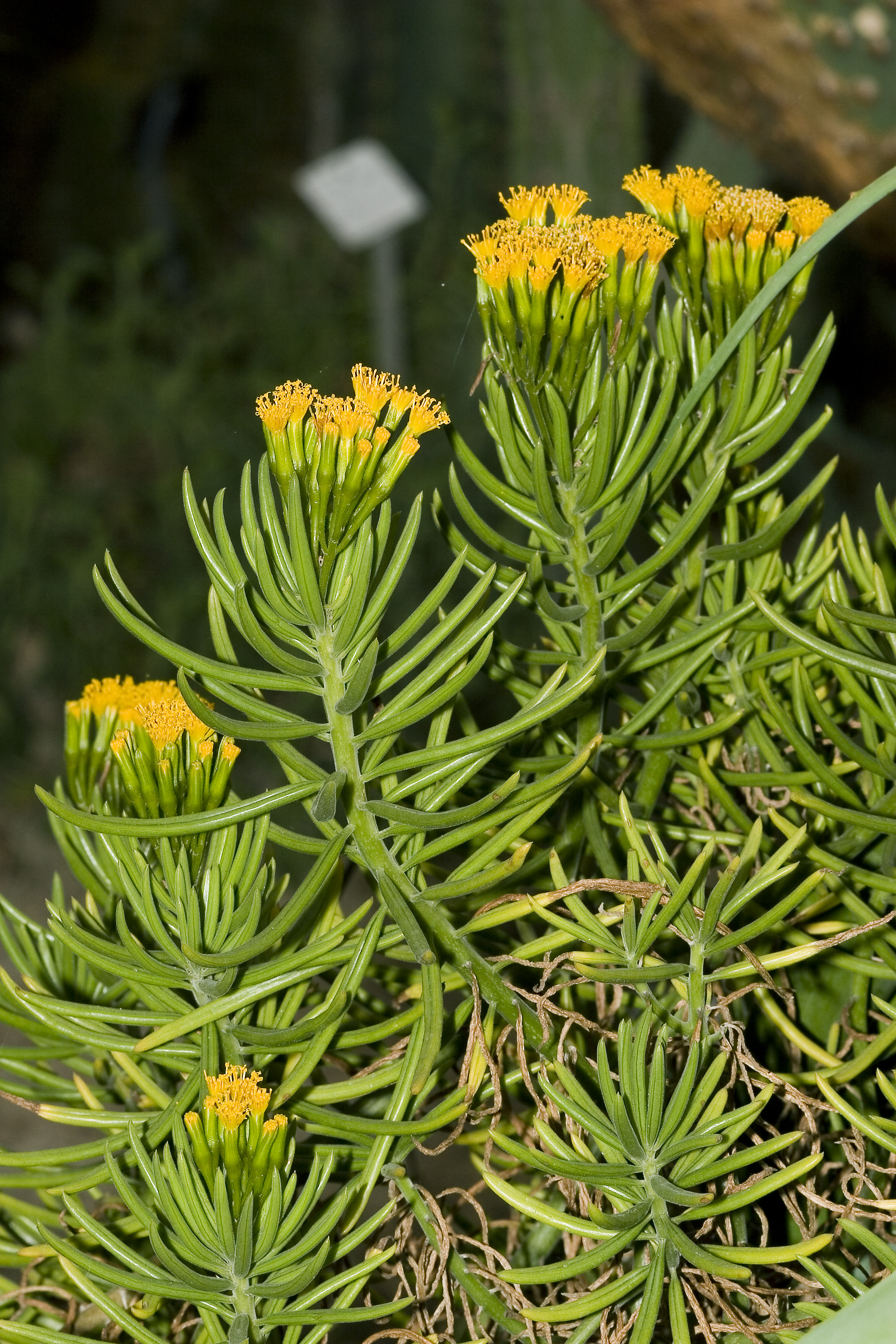
- Barberton groundsel

Conservation status
- Least Concern (SANBI Red List)

Scientific classification
- Kingdom: Plantae
- Clade: Tracheophytes
- Clade: Angiosperms
- Clade: Eudicots
- Clade: Asterids
- Order: Asterales
- Family: Asteraceae
- Genus: Senecio
- Species: S. barbertonicus

Binomial name
- Senecio barbertonicus Klatt
- Range of Senecio barbertonicus.

= Senecio barbertonicus =

Species of shrub

Senecio barbertonicus, the Barberton groundsel or succulent bush senecio, is an evergreen succulent shrub of the family Asteraceae and genus Senecio, native to Southern Africa, named after one of its native localities Barberton and is now also being cultivated elsewhere for its drought resistance, clusters of sweetly scented, golden-yellow, tufted flower heads in winter and attractiveness to butterflies, the painted lady butterfly (Vanessa cardui) in particular.

== Description ==
A succulent bush growing over 2 m (6 ft) tall and wide with a fleshy trunk, light green, cylindrical, finger-like leaves 5 to 10 cm (2 to 4 in) in length and 6 to 10 mm (1/4 to 3/8 in) in diameter, densely packed around the stem and curved at the base to lie parallel to the stem and pointing upwards.

The fragrant yellow flowers, 1 cm (3/8 in) wide and 8 cm (3 in) long, bloom July through September, are terminal and produce seeds with a dense tuft of bristles.

Senecio barbertonicus is hardy to at least −4 °C (25 °F).

== Distribution ==
Senecio barbertonicus grows predominantly in rocky grassland and bushveld in Southern Africa in areas ranging from Eswatini and Mozambique, to Eastern parts of Zimbabwe and South Africa at elevations between 34 and 1,700 m (110 and 5,500 ft).

It is locally common in protected areas in eastern, central, and southwestern Eswatini in Gauteng, KwaZulu-Natal, Limpopo, Mpumalanga and North-West.

== Gallery ==
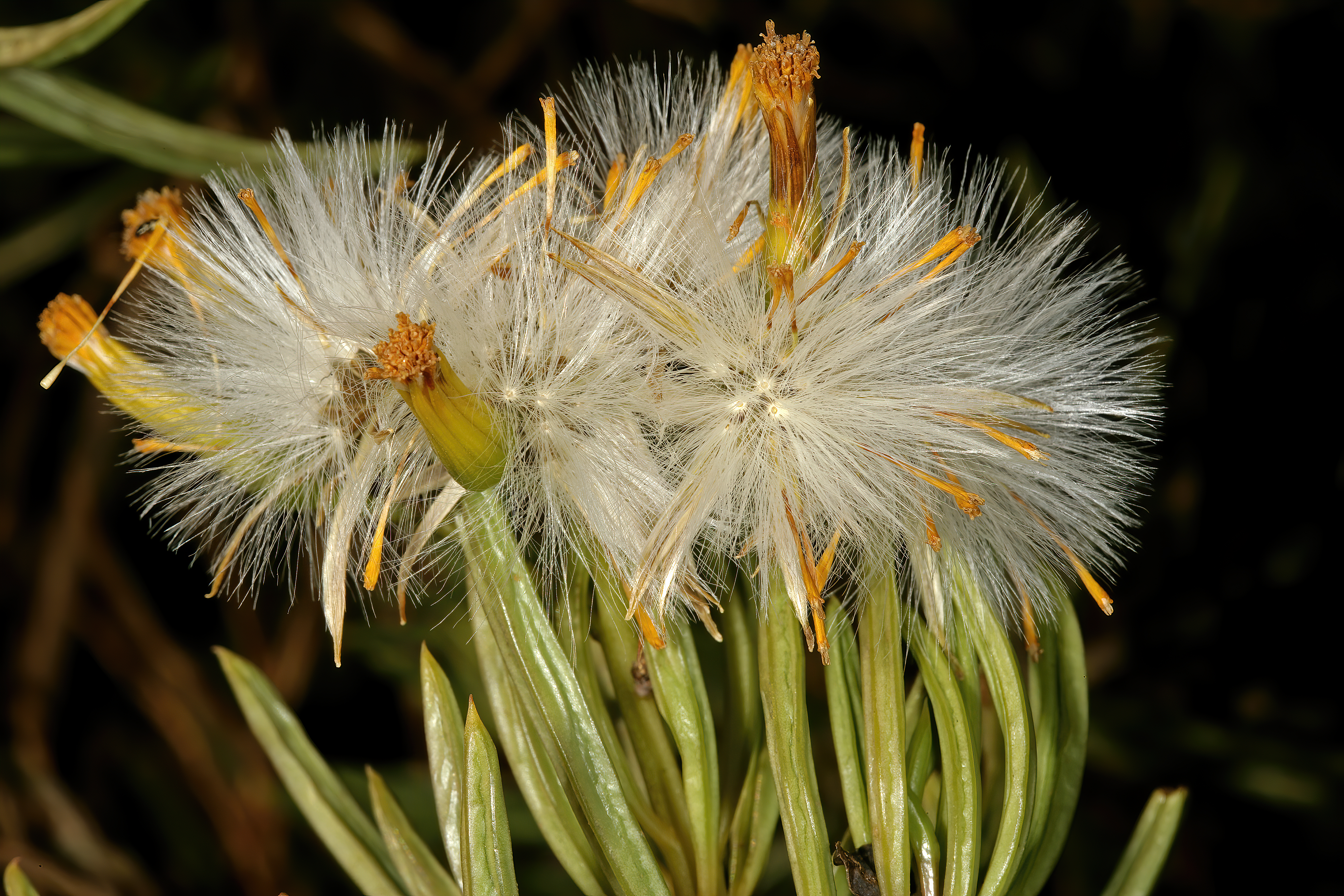
Fruiting flower heads

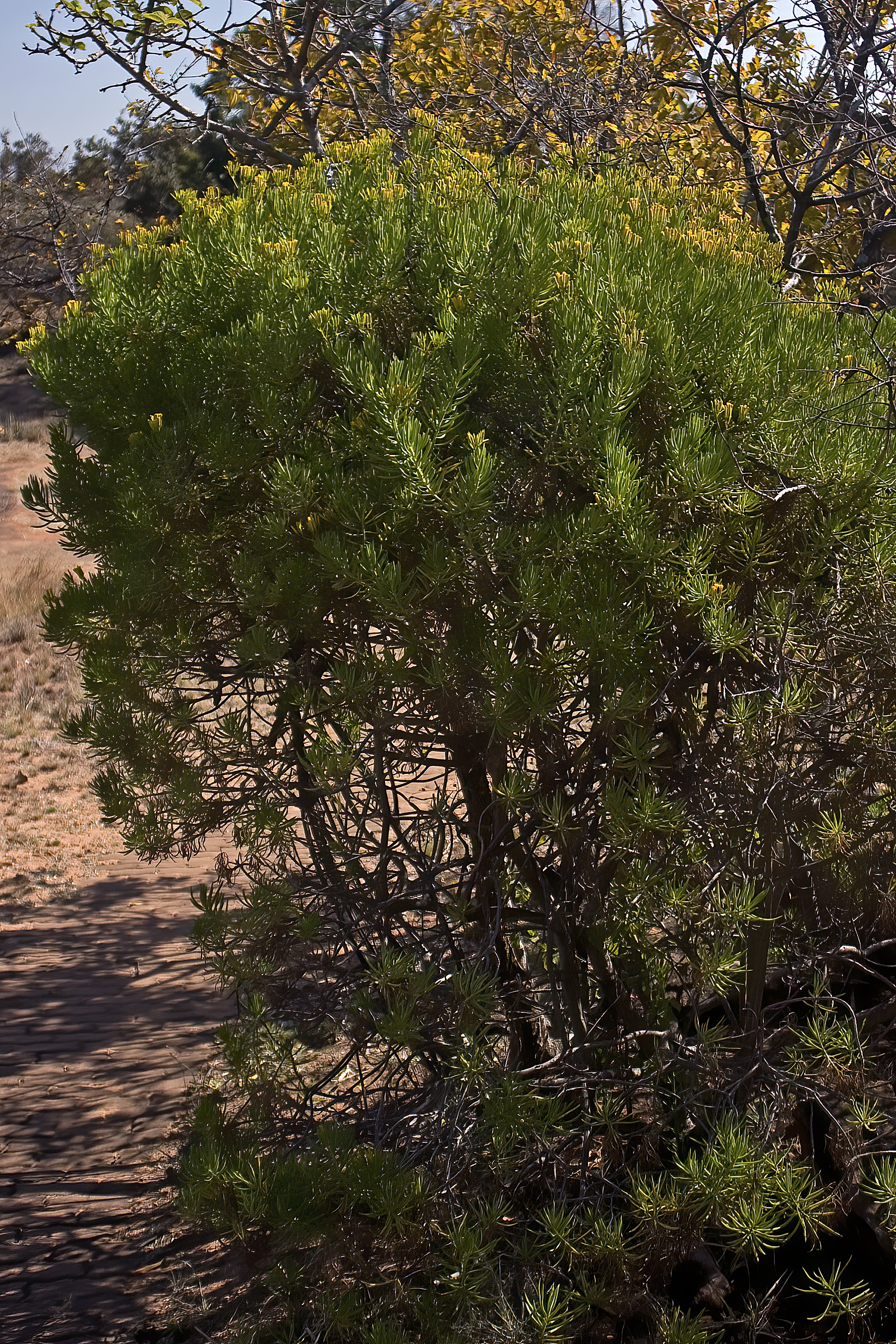
Mature bush
