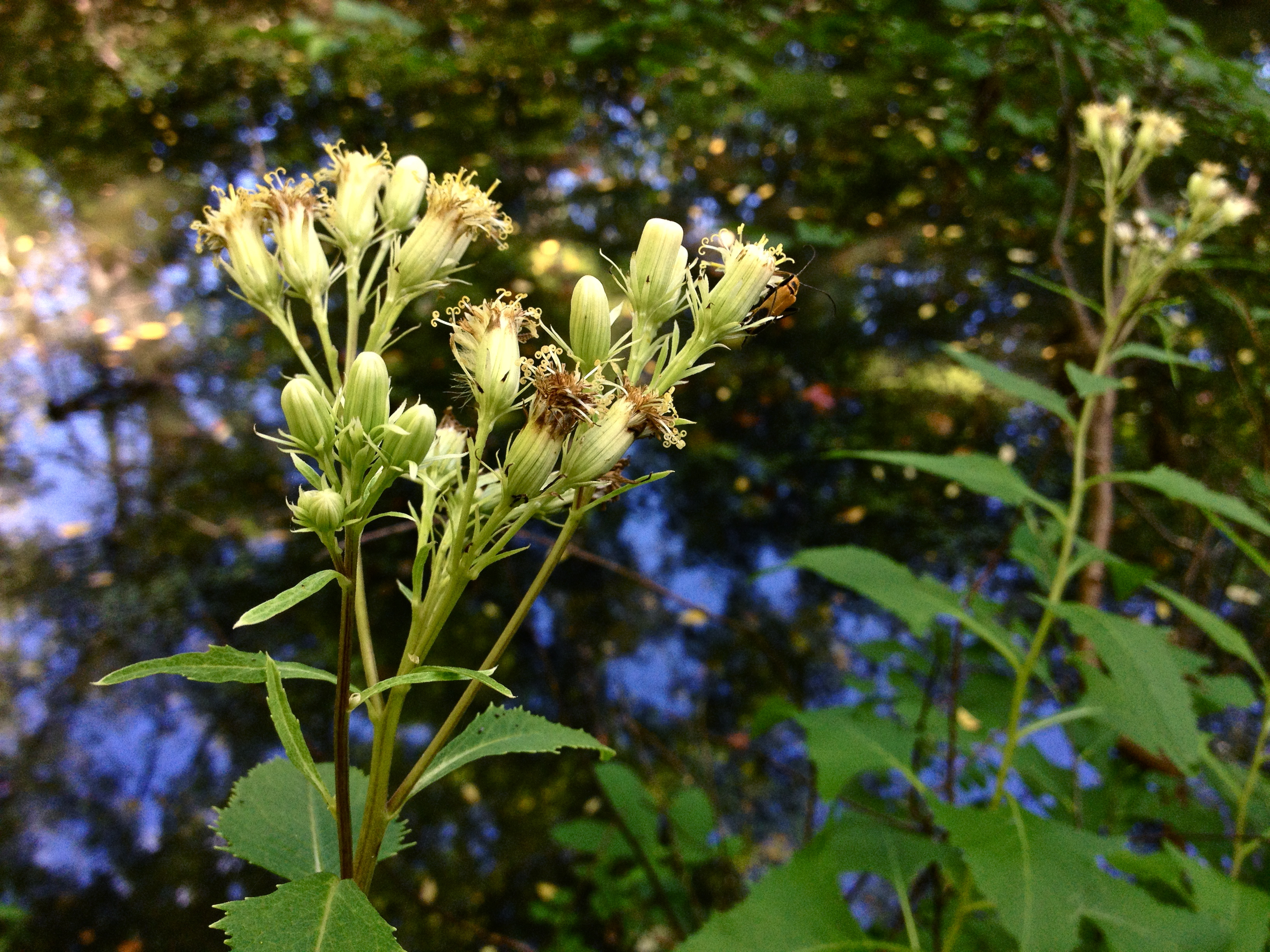

Conservation status
- Apparently Secure (NatureServe)

Scientific classification
- Kingdom: Plantae
- Clade: Tracheophytes
- Clade: Angiosperms
- Clade: Eudicots
- Clade: Asterids
- Order: Asterales
- Family: Asteraceae
- Genus: Hasteola
- Species: H. suaveolens

Binomial name
- Hasteola suaveolens (L.) Pojark

Synonyms
- Cacalia suaveolens L.; Senecio suaveolens (L.) Elliot; Synosma suaveolens (L.) Raf. ex Britton

= Hasteola suaveolens =

Species of flowering plant

Hasteola suaveolens, known by the common names false Indian plantain and sweet scented Indian plantain, is a perennial forb native to the northeastern and north-central United States. It is found from Massachusetts south to Virginia and North Carolina, and west as far as Minnesota and Minnesota and Missouri.

== Description ==
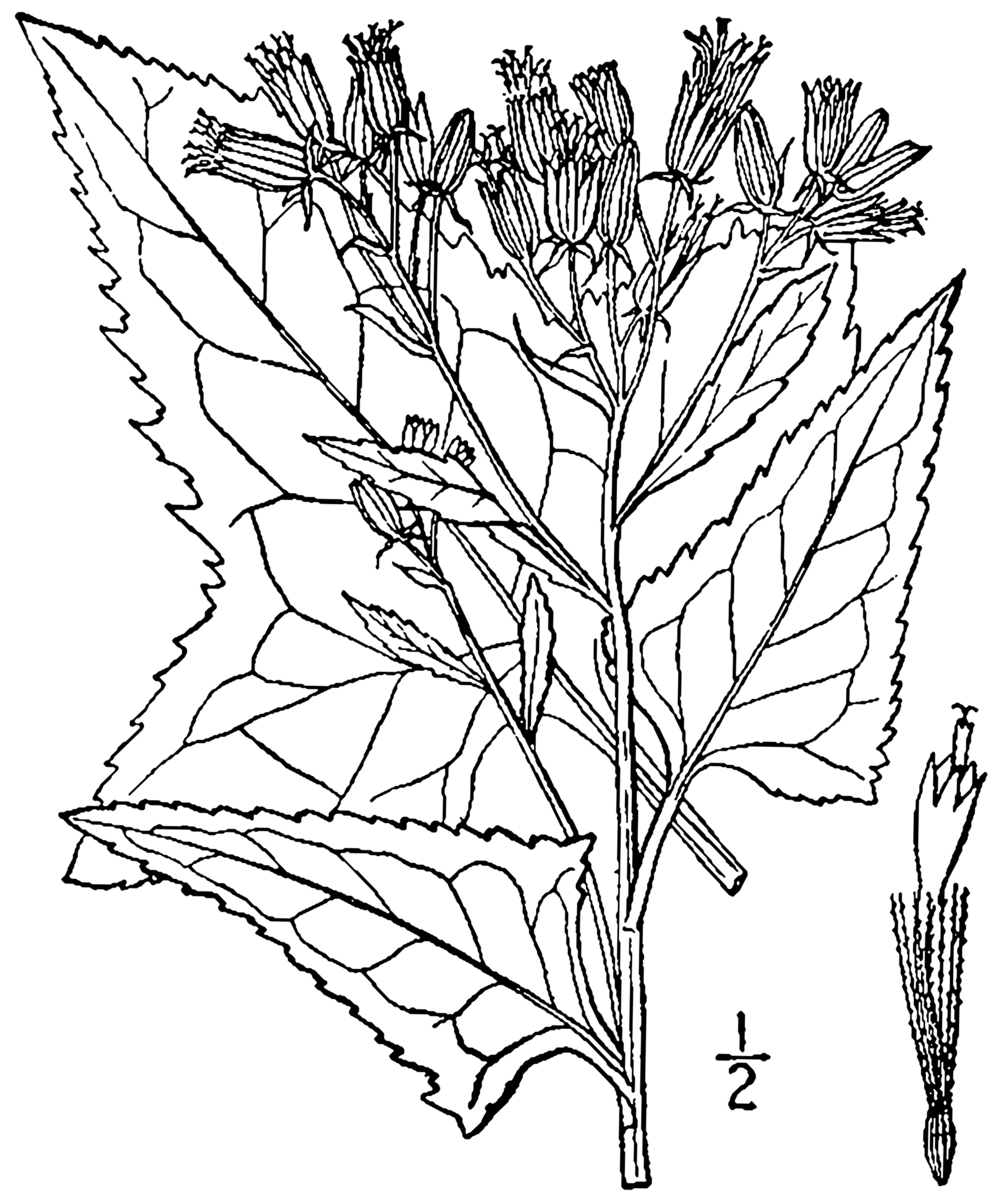
Botanical illustration of Synosma suaveolens (1913)

Hasteola suaveolens is a perennial herb sometimes as much as 240 cm (8 feet) tall, hairless throughout, unbranched below the inflorescence. The spearhead shaped (hastate) leaves are 10 to 25 cm (4 to 10 in) long and 5 to 15 cm (2 to 6 in) wide with serrated (toothed) edges. The plant flowers in late summer or early fall. The inflorescence is one or several roughly flat topped clusters of several to many flower heads consisting entirely of 18–55 white or very pale yellow disc florets, but no ray florets. The fruit is a cypsela with a pappus of white bristles.

== Distribution and habitat ==
Hasteola suaveolens has a native range that includes twenty-two states east and two states west of the Mississippi River, in eastern and central USA. It is listed as an endangered species in the states of Connecticut, Maryland, Minnesota and New York, it is listed as threatened in Iowa and Tennessee, and it is listed as historical in Rhode Island, meaning that it is presumed extirpated. Hasteola suaveolens is now less common or absent in the northern part of its range. There may be only one population left of this species in all of New England. In Virginia, it grows in habitats such as floodplain forests and riverbanks, along the Potomac, Shenandoah, and New rivers. The presence of this species is dependent on appropriate habitat, and it may be eliminated from an area by development, changes in land use, or competition with invasive species. In Minnesota the native habitat is wet meadows along stream banks and the edges of marshes but due to the loss of much these habitats it may be restricted to wet ditches.
