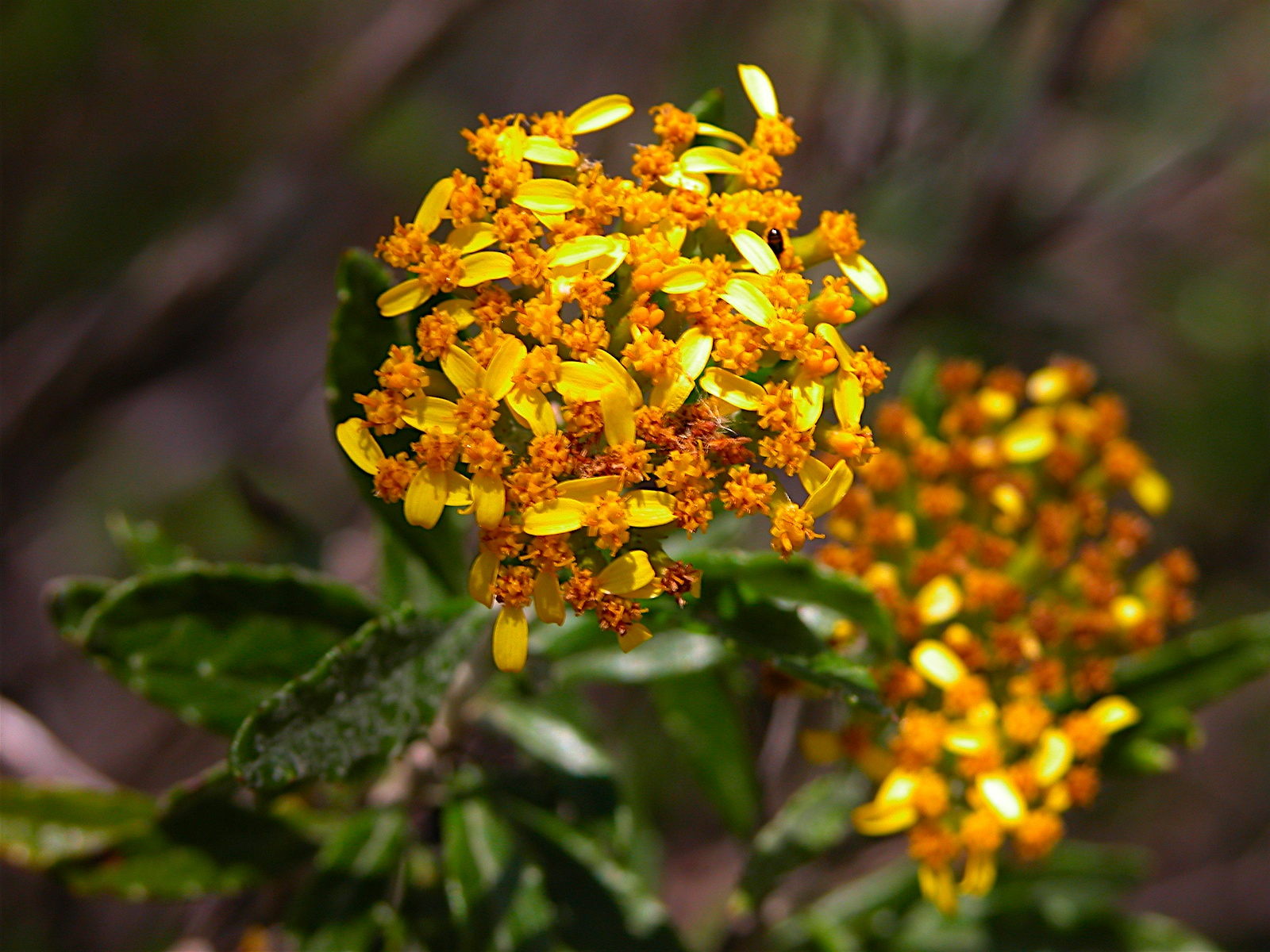

Conservation status
- Endangered (IUCN 3.1)

Scientific classification
- Kingdom: Plantae
- Clade: Tracheophytes
- Clade: Angiosperms
- Clade: Eudicots
- Clade: Asterids
- Order: Asterales
- Family: Asteraceae
- Genus: Elekmania
- Species: E. barahonensis

Binomial name
- Elekmania barahonensis (Urban) B.Nord.

= Elekmania barahonensis =

Species of flowering plant

Elekmania barahonensis is a species of the genus Elekmania. It is endemic to the Dominican Republic.
