= Senecio lamarckianus =

Conservation status
- Critically Endangered (IUCN 2.3)

Scientific classification
- Kingdom: Plantae
- Clade: Tracheophytes
- Clade: Angiosperms
- Clade: Eudicots
- Clade: Asterids
- Order: Asterales
- Family: Asteraceae
- Genus: Senecio
- Species: S. lamarckianus

Binomial name
- Senecio lamarckianus Bullock

Synonyms
- Conyza appendiculata Lam.; Senecio appendiculatus (Lam.) DC.; Synarthrum appendiculatum (Lam.) Cass.

Species of flowering plant

Senecio lamarckianus, the bois de chèvre (English: wood/antler of goat), is a species of flowering plant in the aster family. It is endemic to the island of Mauritius and is threatened by habitat loss. It is named for the French philosopher, botanist and zoologist Jean-Baptiste Lamarck.

== Description ==
Senicio lamarckianus is a many-branched perennial shrub, 2 m (6.6 ft) to 3 m (9.8 ft) tall.

The stalk and branches are densely covered with white hairs. Its oblong leather-like leaves are silvery greenish colored, 11 cm (4.3 in) to 13 cm (5.1 in) long by 3 cm (1.2 in) to 5.2 cm (2.0 in) wide and are attached to the branch with a leaf stalk 1 cm (0.4 in) to 2 cm (0.8 in) long, which bear on opposite sides small, well-spaced lanceolate lobules. The leaves are pointed at the tips and slender at the base; serrated, more so at the tips, mostly hairless on the tops and densely hairy underneath.

Numerous flower heads cluster into a flat top, each on its own flower stalk; center flower heads tend to open first. The inflorescence is completely covered in white hairs and appears in groups of seven. Each flower head contains clusters composed of ray florets with 2.8 mm (0.1 in) long yellow rays and a tube 2 mm (0.08 in) long. The internal florets have a yellow 3.9 mm (0.15 in) corolla with 1.6 mm (0.06 in) long lobes.

The smooth achenes can vary between 1.2 mm (0.05 in) and 1.8 mm (0.07 in) in length. Each bears a pappus of 2.7 mm (0.11 in) to 3 mm (0.12 in) long with white hairs.

== Distribution ==
Endemic to Mauritius and now very rare, the plant grows in dry mountainous regions around the summit peaks of the island. Localities include Mondrain, Pieter Both Mountain, Gubbies, crests above Port Louis and Piton du Fouge Ridge Forest, mostly the latter. More might grow in more remote areas.
