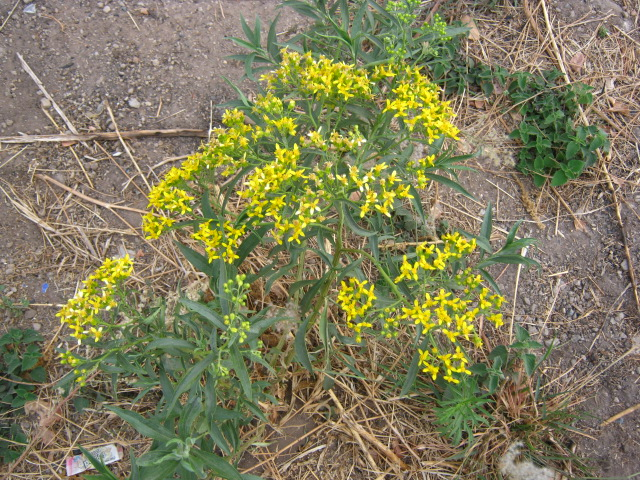

Conservation status
- Apparently Secure (NatureServe)

Scientific classification
- Kingdom: Plantae
- Clade: Embryophytes
- Clade: Tracheophytes
- Clade: Angiosperms
- Clade: Eudicots
- Clade: Asterids
- Order: Asterales
- Family: Asteraceae
- Subfamily: Asteroideae
- Tribe: Senecioneae
- Genus: Barkleyanthus; H.Rob. & Brettell
- Species: B. salicifolius

Binomial name
- Barkleyanthus salicifolius (Kunth) H.Rob. & Brettell

Synonyms
- Cineraria angustifolia Kunth; Cineraria dracunculoides Moc. & Sessé ex DC.; Cineraria salicifolia Kunth; Cineraria verna Mair. ex DC; Senecio axillaris Klatt; Senecio salignus DC.; Senecio vernus DC.; Senecio xarilla Sessé & Moc.

= Barkleyanthus =

Genus of flowering plants

Barkleyanthus is a monotypic genus of flowering plants in the aster family, Asteraceae, containing the single species Barkleyanthus salicifolius, a plant formerly classified in the genus Senecio. It is native to North and Central America, where its distribution extends from the southwestern United States to El Salvador. Its common names include willow ragwort, willow groundsel, Barkley's-ragwort, and jarilla.

This plant is a shrub producing a branching stem usually about one to two meters tall, but known to exceed 4 meters at times. The leaves are roughly lance-shaped and are alternately arranged, sometimes more densely toward the ends of branches. They are up to 10 or 15 centimeters long. The inflorescence is often a wide array of several flower heads, but they may also be clustered in the leaf axils or branch tips. The head contains a few yellow ray florets, which are pistillate, and up to 25 or more yellow disc florets, which are bisexual. The fruit is a rough-textured, pyramidal or prism-shaped cypsela up to a centimeter long including its pappus of many barbed white bristles.

This plant is abundant in parts of its range, particularly in Mexico, sometimes becoming weedy. It flowers year-round, especially in spring, and it may be in full flower at the end of the dry season. It is admired for its yellow flower heads and is cultivated as an ornamental plant.

The plant is used in Mexican traditional medicine to treat fever and rheumatism. In Chiapas it is used as an insecticide in corn supplies. Secondary metabolites isolated from the species include pyrrolizidine alkaloids, lactones, furoeremophilanes, and sesquiterpenes.
