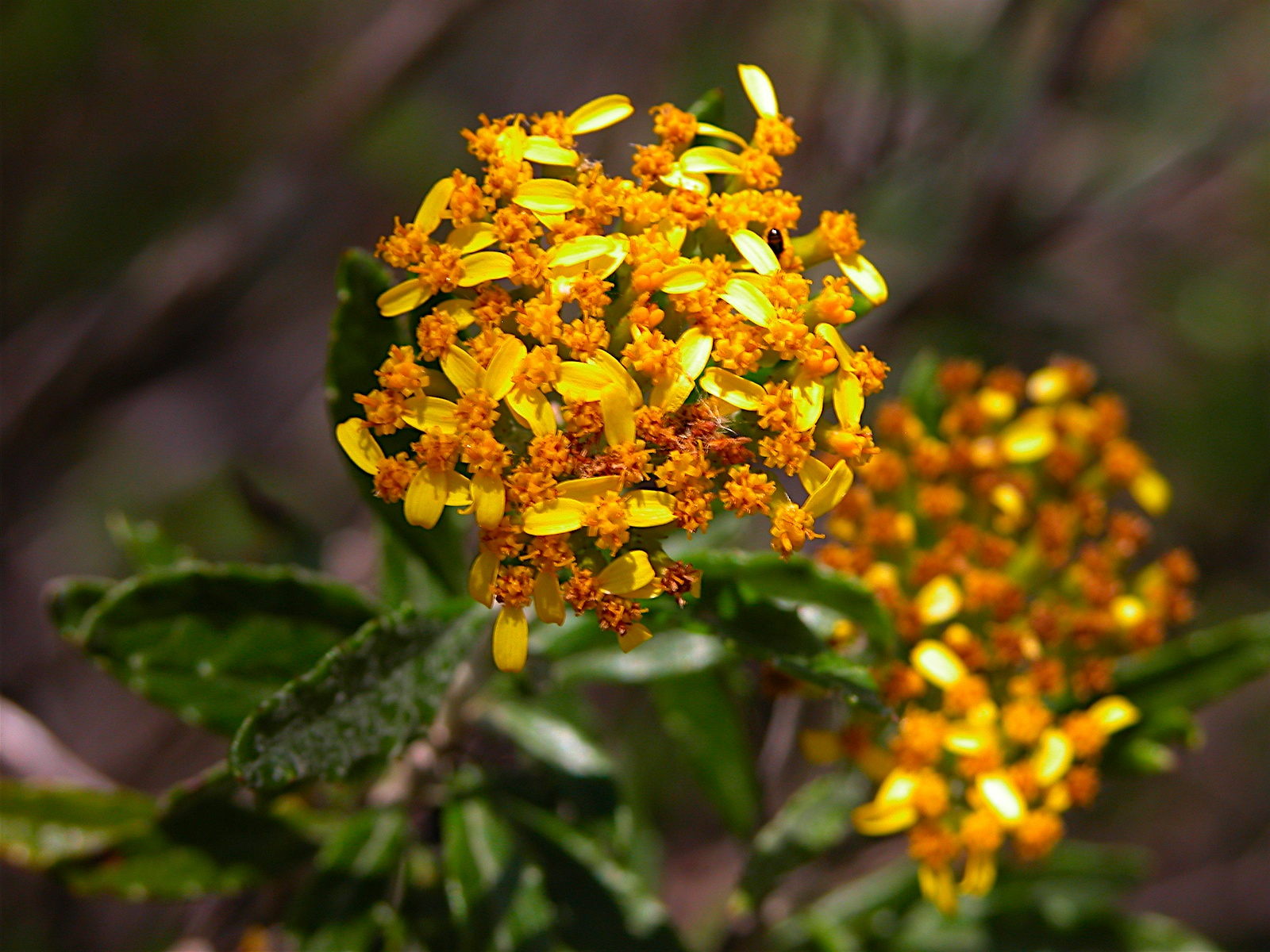
- Elekmania barahonensis

Scientific classification
- Kingdom: Plantae
- Clade: Tracheophytes
- Clade: Angiosperms
- Clade: Eudicots
- Clade: Asterids
- Order: Asterales
- Family: Asteraceae
- Subfamily: Asteroideae
- Tribe: Senecioneae
- Genus: Elekmania; B.Nord.

Type species
- E. barahonensis (Urban) B.Nord.

Species
- See text

= Elekmania =

Genus of flowering plants

Elekmania is a genus of the tribe Senecioneae and the family Asteraceae. All species are endemic to the Caribbean island of Hispaniola, in the Dominican Republic and Haiti.

== Taxonomy ==
The genus was first published by Bertil Nordenstam in Compositae Newslett. vol.44 on page 66 in 2006. Most if not all of its members used to be placed in Senecio.

The genus name of Elekmania is in honour of Erik Leonard Ekman (1883–1931), who was a Swedish botanist and explorer that described the majority of Hispaniola's flora.

== Species ==
It includes 9 accepted species;

- Elekmania barahonensis (Urb.) B.Nord.
- Elekmania buchii (Urb.) B.Nord.
- Elekmania fuertesii (Urb.) B.Nord.
- Elekmania haitiensis (Krug & Urb.) B.Nord.
- Elekmania kuekenthalii (Urb. & Ekman) B.Nord.
- Elekmania marciana (Urb. & Ekman) B.Nord.
- Elekmania picardae (Krug & Urb.) B.Nord.
- Elekmania samanensis (Urb.) B.Nord.
- Elekmania stenodon (Urb.) B.Nord.
