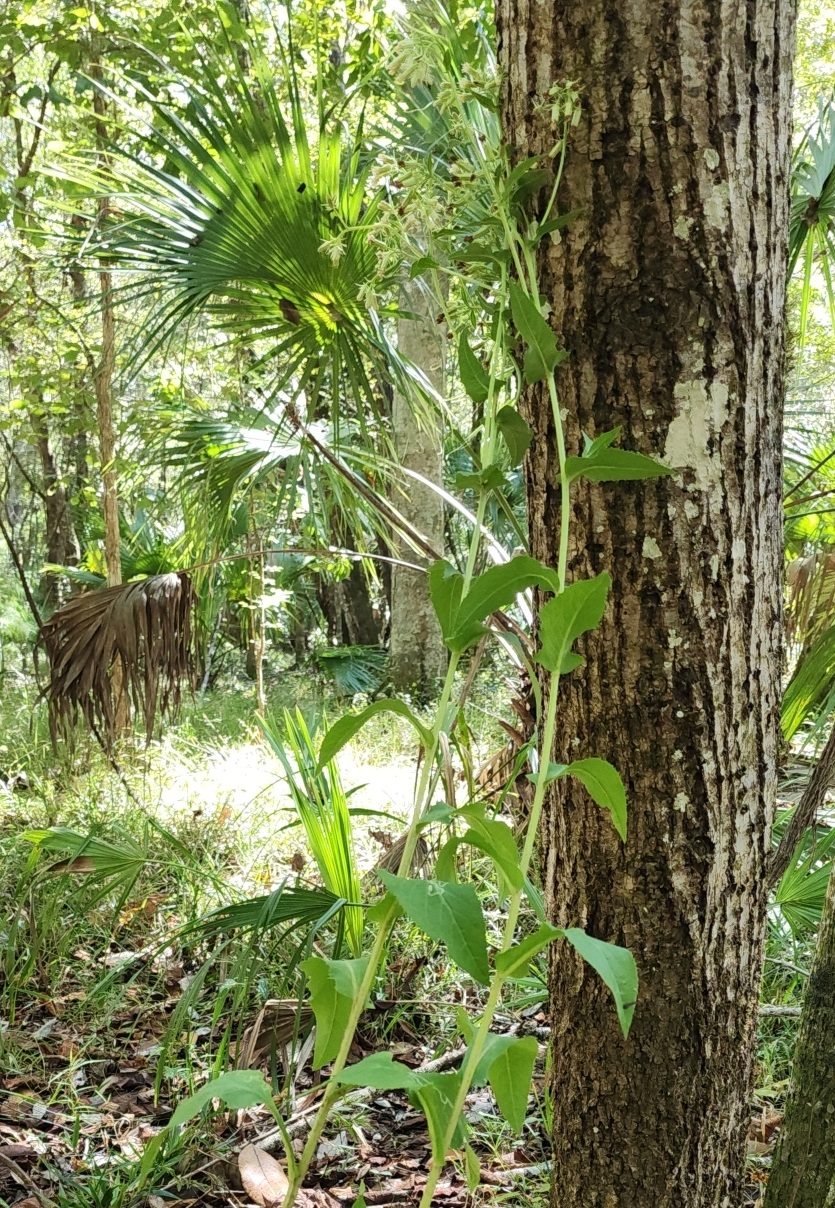
- Growing in a calcareous hydric hammock

Conservation status
- Critically Imperiled (NatureServe)

Scientific classification
- Kingdom: Plantae
- Clade: Embryophytes
- Clade: Tracheophytes
- Clade: Spermatophytes
- Clade: Angiosperms
- Clade: Eudicots
- Clade: Asterids
- Order: Asterales
- Family: Asteraceae
- Genus: Hasteola
- Species: H. robertiorum

Binomial name
- Hasteola robertiorum L.C.Anderson

= Hasteola robertiorum =

Species of flowering plant

Hasteola robertiorum, commonly referred to as hammockherb or Gulf coast hammock plantain, is a rare species of flowering plant endemic to north-central peninsular Florida in the US.

== Habitat ==
It grows in hydric hammocks and mucky microhabitats along spring-fed blackwater rivers.

In the hammock context, it is known to grow in the understory of swamp laurel oak, American sweetgum, and southern live oak.

== Conservation ==
The species is known from two disjunct metapopulations in Levy and Lake counties, where it is known from only 4 sites. However, it is possible that there are as yet undiscovered populations in the hammocks of the Big Bend region.
