= Monticalia rosmarinifolia =

Conservation status
- Vulnerable (IUCN 3.1)

Scientific classification
- Kingdom: Plantae
- Clade: Tracheophytes
- Clade: Angiosperms
- Clade: Eudicots
- Clade: Asterids
- Order: Asterales
- Family: Asteraceae
- Genus: Monticalia
- Species: M. rosmarinifolia

Binomial name
- Monticalia rosmarinifolia (Benth.) C.Jeffrey

Species of flowering plant

Monticalia rosmarinifolia is a species of flowering plant belonging to the family Asteraceae. It is found only in Ecuador. Its natural habitat is subtropical or tropical high-altitude grassland. It is threatened by habitat loss.
