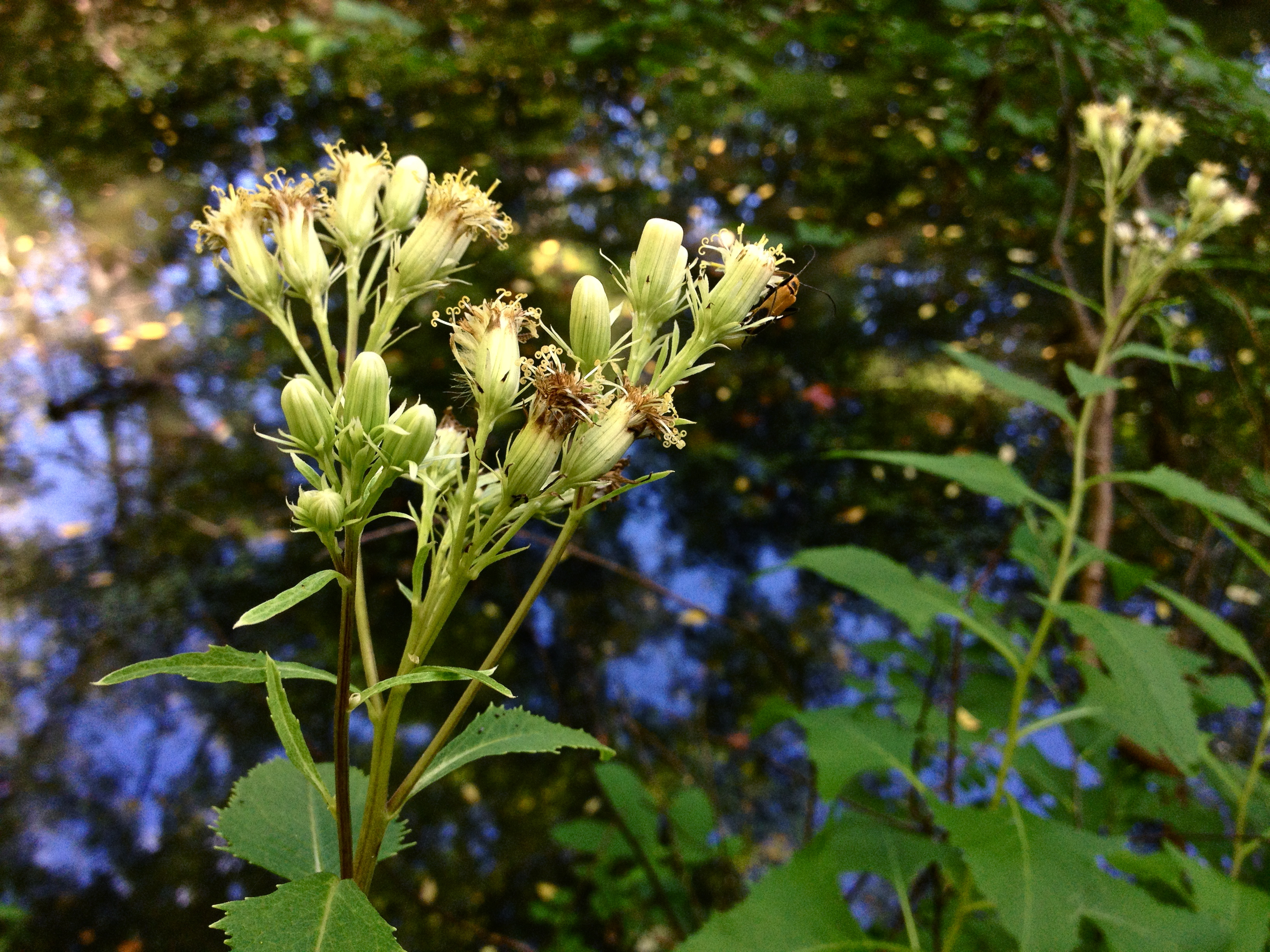
- Hasteola suaveolens

Scientific classification
- Kingdom: Plantae
- Clade: Embryophytes
- Clade: Tracheophytes
- Clade: Angiosperms
- Clade: Eudicots
- Clade: Asterids
- Order: Asterales
- Family: Asteraceae
- Subfamily: Asteroideae
- Tribe: Senecioneae
- Genus: Hasteola; Raf.

Synonyms
- Synosma Raf. ex Britton & A.Br.

= Hasteola =

Genus of flowering plants

Hasteola is a genus of flowering plants in the daisy family, Asteraceae.

Species

- Hasteola kamtschatica (Maxim.) Pojark. - Russian Far East, northeastern China, Korea
- Hasteola praetermissa Poljakov - Russian Far East
- Hasteola robertiorum L.C.Anderson - Florida
- Hasteola robusta (Tolm.) Pojark. - Japan, Kuril Islands, Sakhalin
- Hasteola suaveolens (L.) Pojark. - eastern United States
- Hasteola tschonoskii (Koidz.) Pojark. - China, Korea, Mongolia
