= Villasenoria =

Scientific classification
- Kingdom: Plantae
- Clade: Tracheophytes
- Clade: Angiosperms
- Clade: Eudicots
- Clade: Asterids
- Order: Asterales
- Family: Asteraceae
- Subfamily: Asteroideae
- Tribe: Senecioneae
- Genus: Villasenoria; B.L.Clark
- Species: V. orcuttii

Binomial name
- Villasenoria orcuttii (Greenm.) B.L.Clark

Synonyms
- Senecio orcuttii Greenm.; Telanthophora orcuttii (Greenm.) H.Rob. & Brettell

Genus of flowering plants

Villasenoria is a genus of Mexican plants in the groundsel tribe within the daisy family.

The genus is named in honor of Mexican botanist José Luis Villaseñor Ríos.

Species

The only known species is Villasenoria orcuttii, native to southern Mexico (States of Veracruz, Oaxaca, Chiapas).
