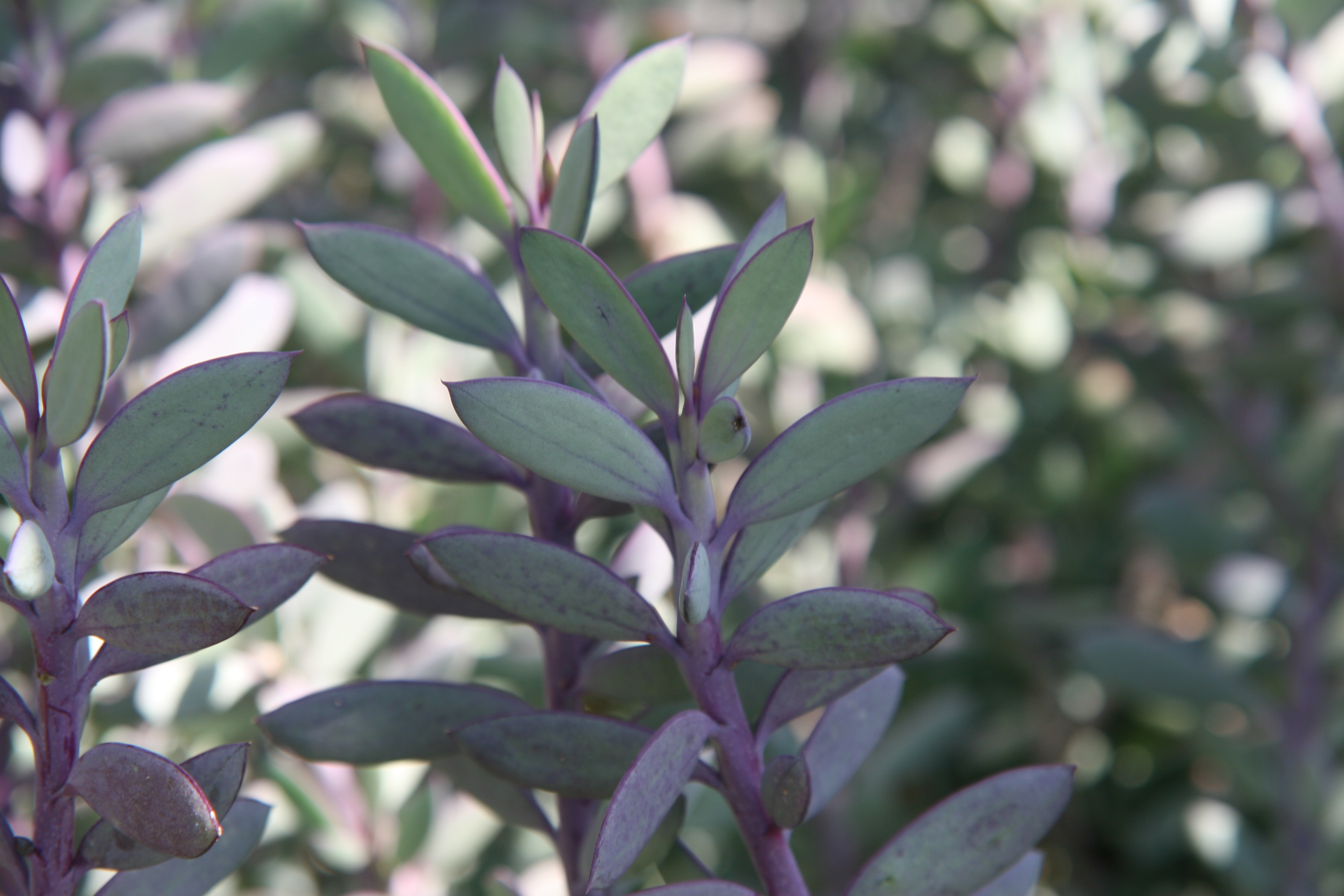

Scientific classification
- Kingdom: Plantae
- Clade: Tracheophytes
- Clade: Angiosperms
- Clade: Eudicots
- Clade: Asterids
- Order: Asterales
- Family: Asteraceae
- Genus: Senecio
- Species: S. crassissimus

Binomial name
- Senecio crassissimus Humbert (1923) Sources: IPNI, GRIN

= Senecio crassissimus =

Species of flowering plant

Senecio crassissimus, the propeller plant, vertical leaf or lavender steps, is a succulent species of flowering plant in the daisy family Asteraceae, and is endemic to the island of Madagascar off the east coast of Africa.

== Description ==
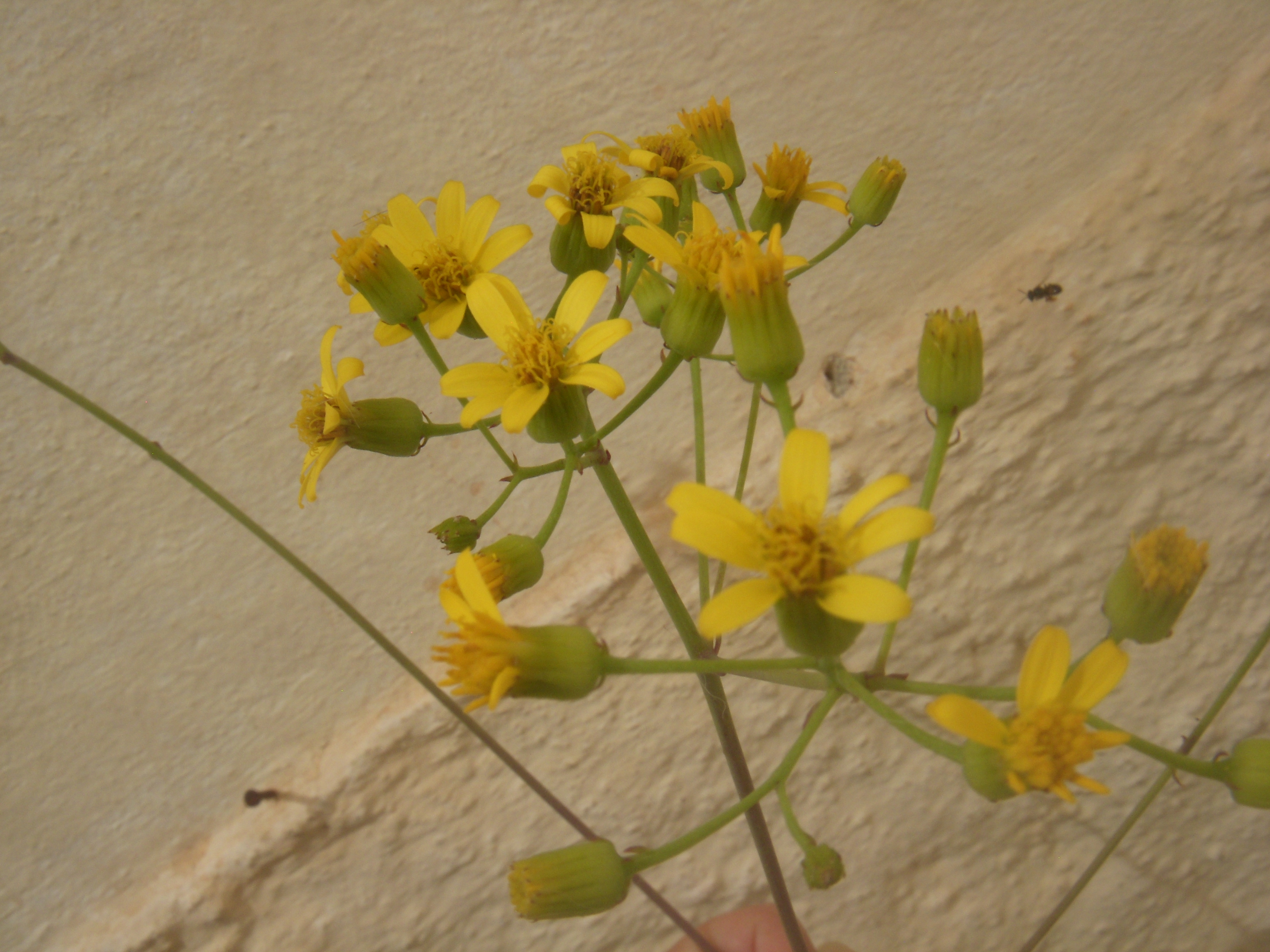
Yellow flowers

It is an erect straight grower that reaches a height of 60cm and width of 45cm. Resembling the propellers of a plane, its fleshy and flat blue-green leaves have purple borders and are flat where they change direction and never face the sun. This motion helps the leaves forestall the loss of moisture in hot environments.

Its daisy-like inflorescence are yellow on a long stalk, 30-60 cm long, with scale-like bracts that are branched to the top into a loose corymb that hold 30 or more daisy-like heads. Capitula is 6 mm in diameter with 5 or rarely 6 ray florets. Flowers appear in mid-summer to autumn.

== Cultivation ==
Drought tolerant, it grows well in full sun and is sensitive to overwatering, where it will become mushy. The plant can survive extended periods with no to very little hydration. Like many senecios, their growing season is in the winter, where would be dormant in the summer months.

== Gallery ==
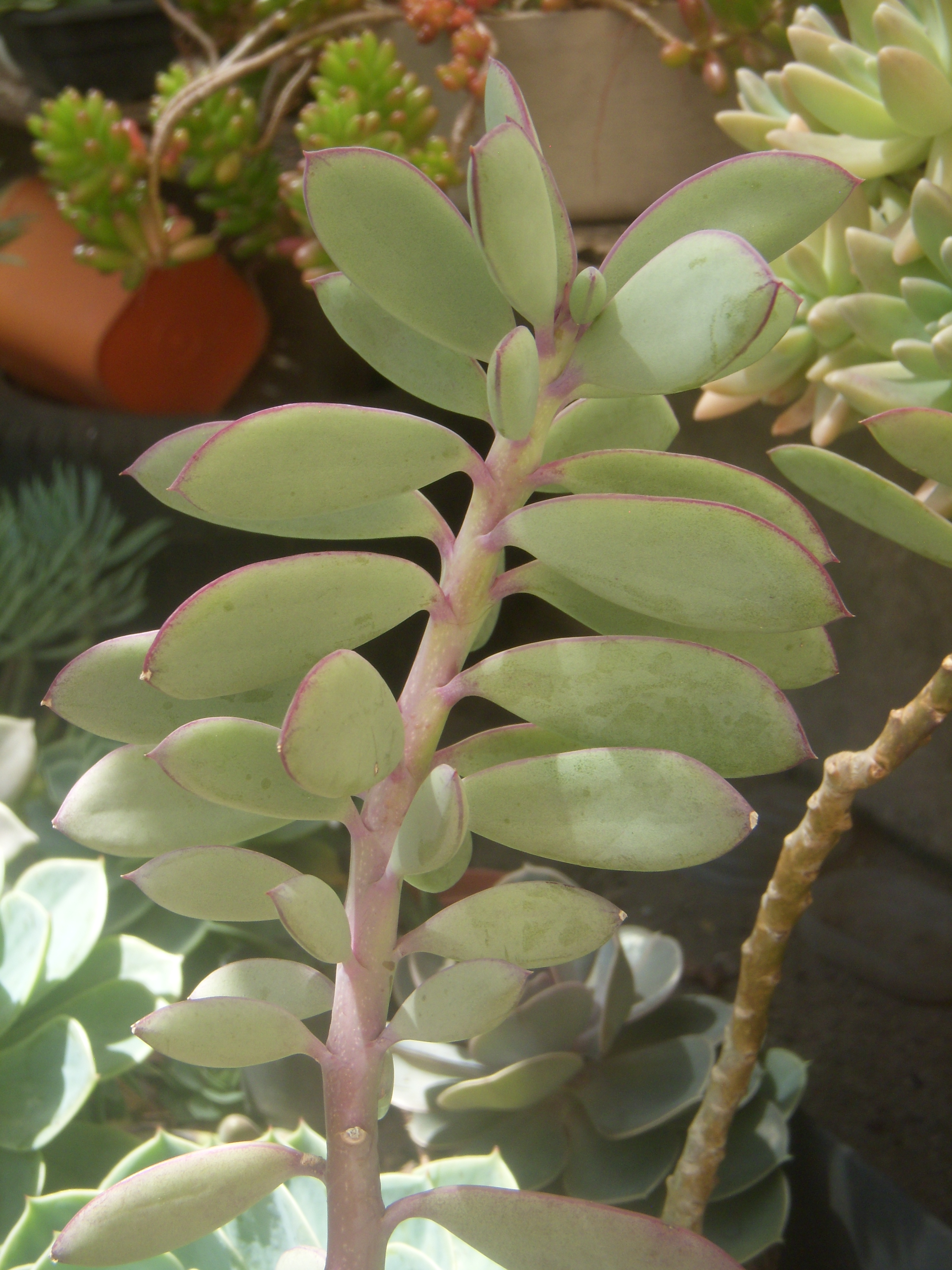
Leaf detail

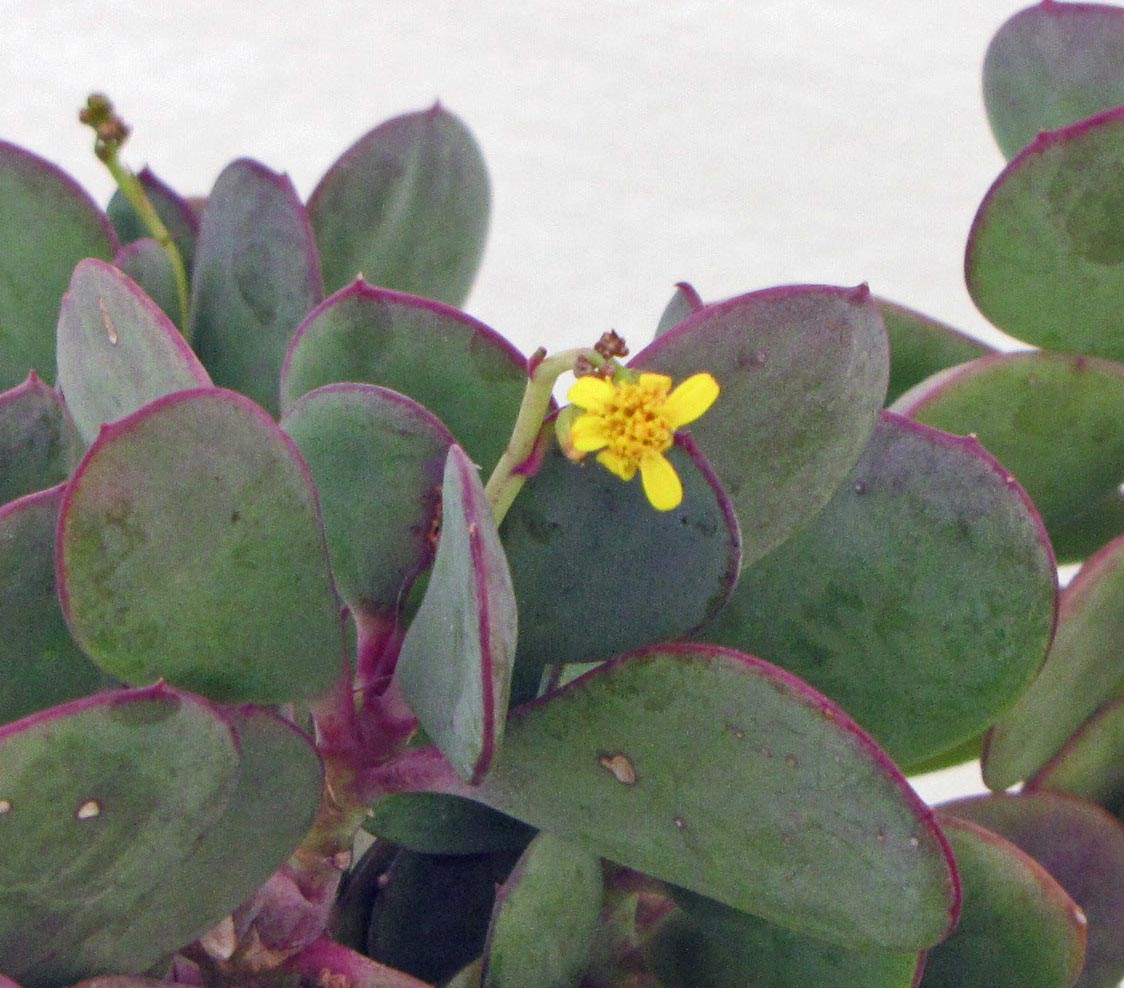
Emerging flower

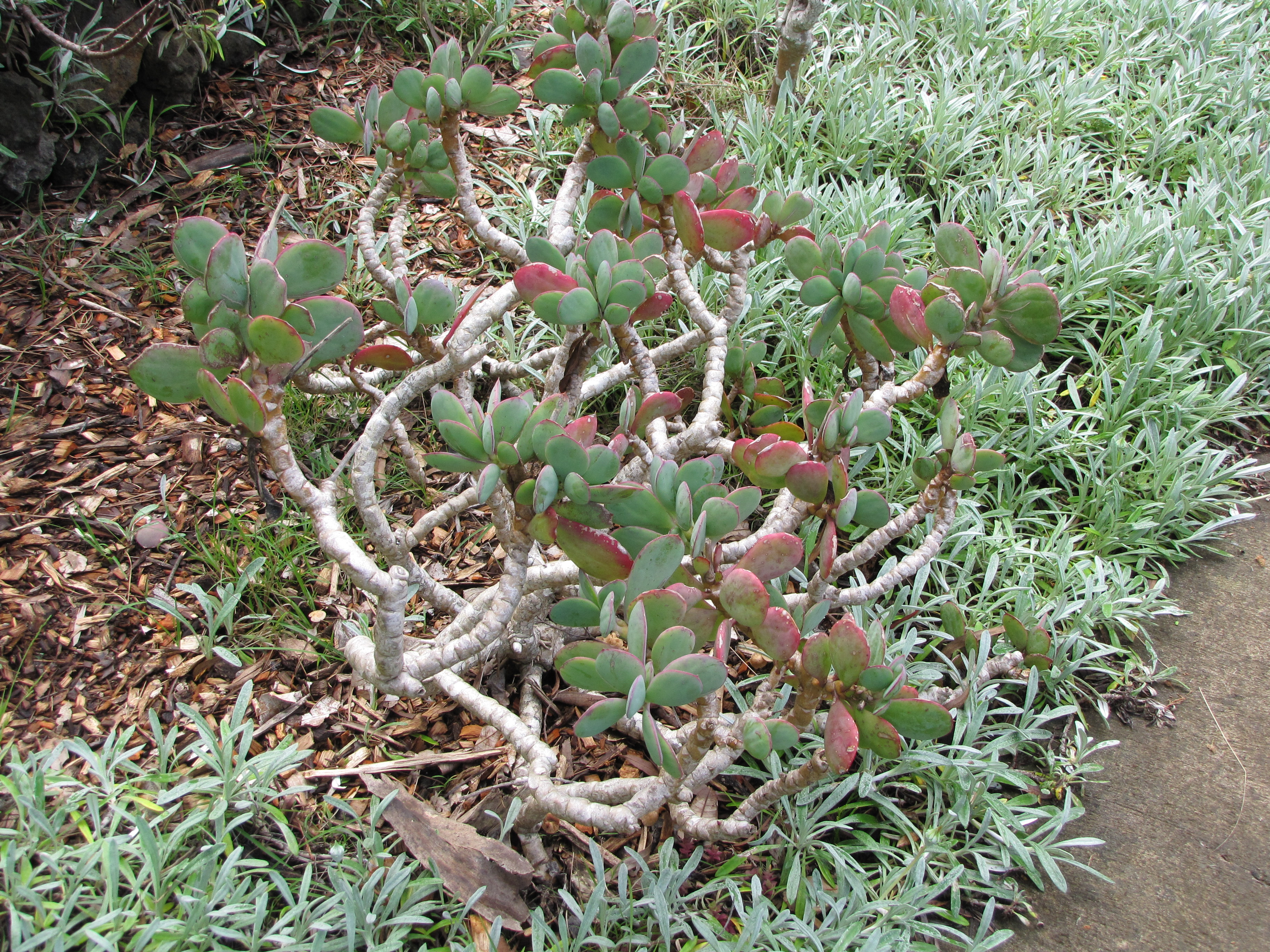
Habit

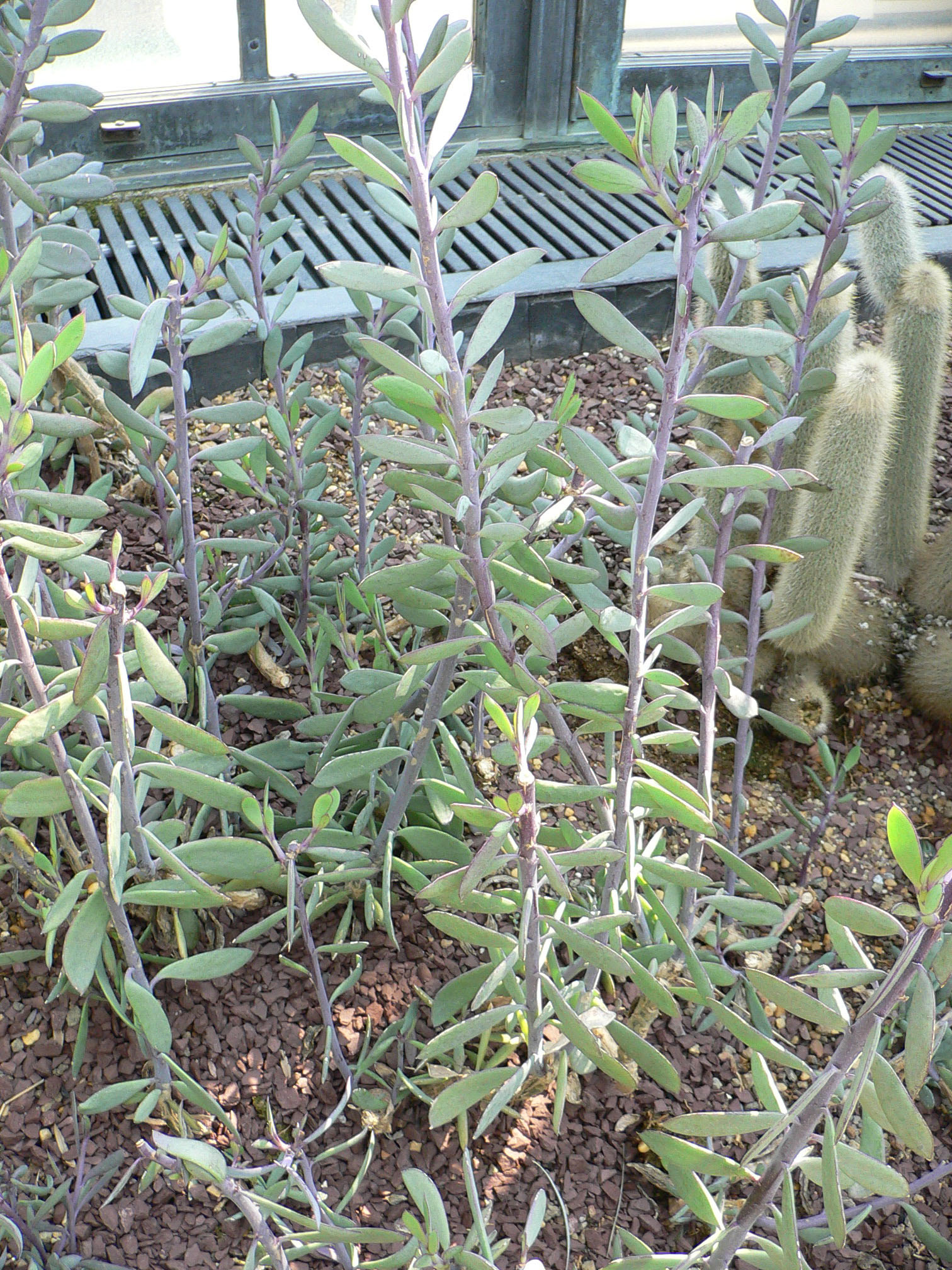
A clump

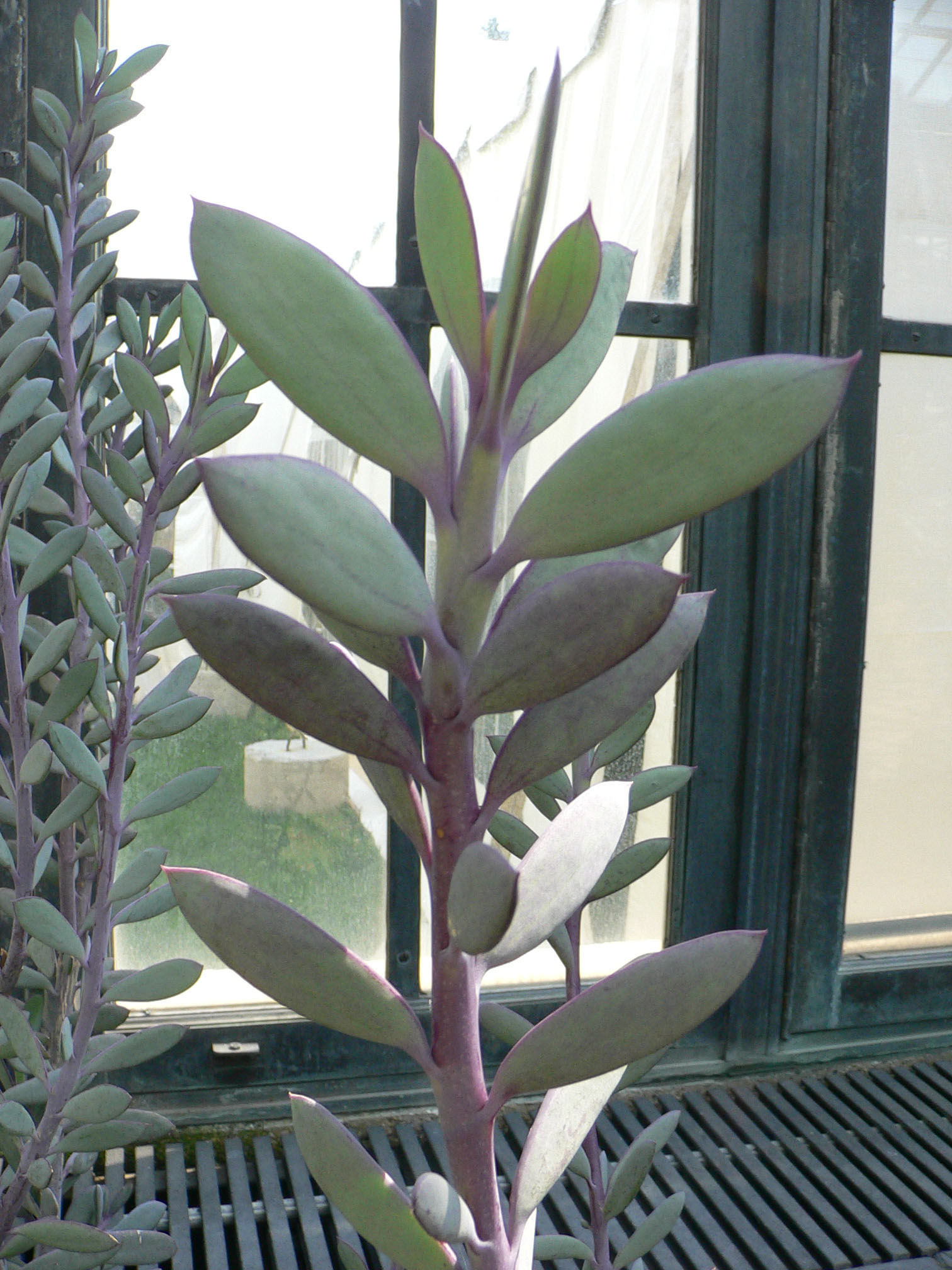
Houseplants
