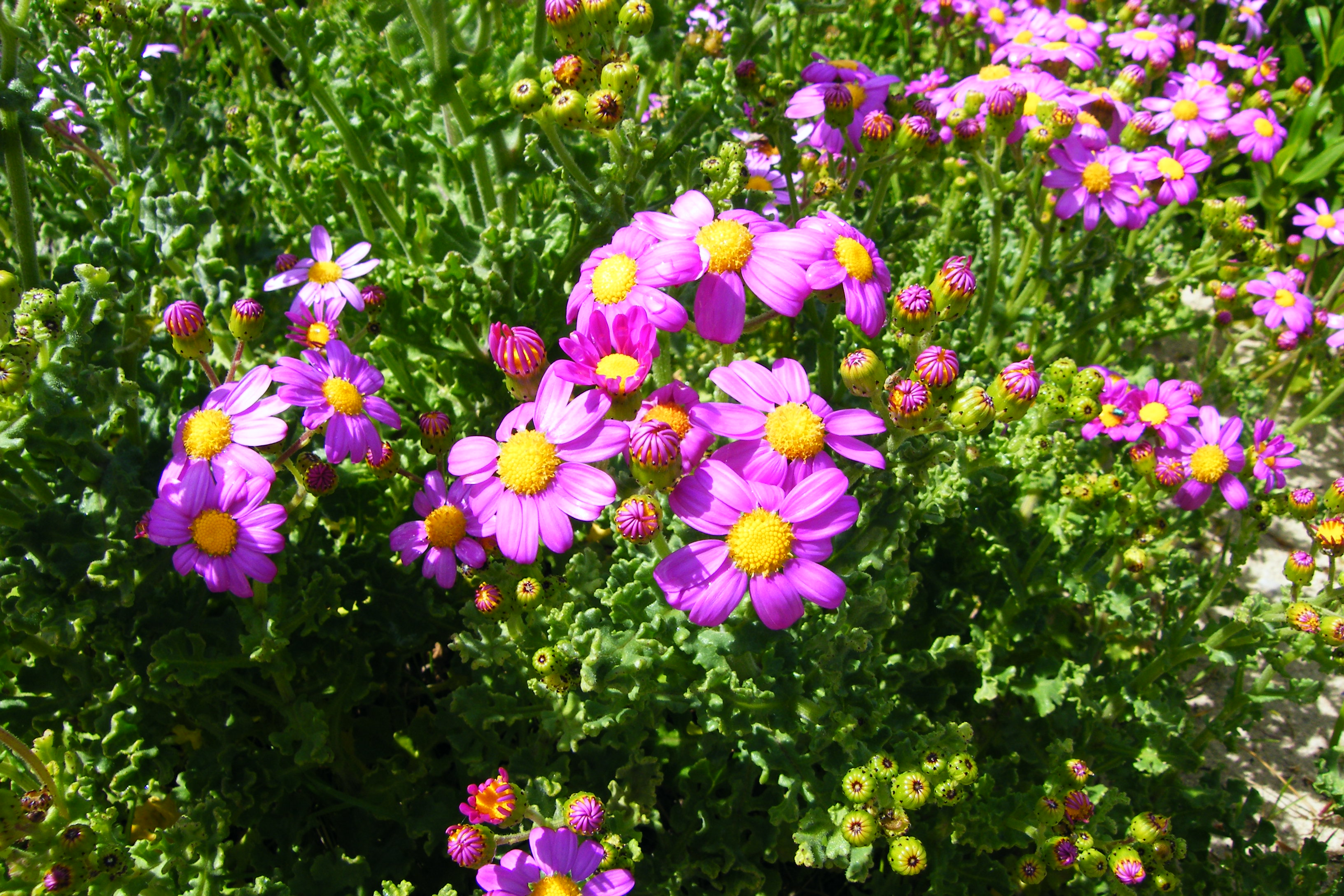

Scientific classification
- Kingdom: Plantae
- Clade: Tracheophytes
- Clade: Angiosperms
- Clade: Eudicots
- Clade: Asterids
- Order: Asterales
- Family: Asteraceae
- Genus: Senecio
- Species: S. elegans

Binomial name
- Senecio elegans L.

= Senecio elegans =

Species of flowering plant

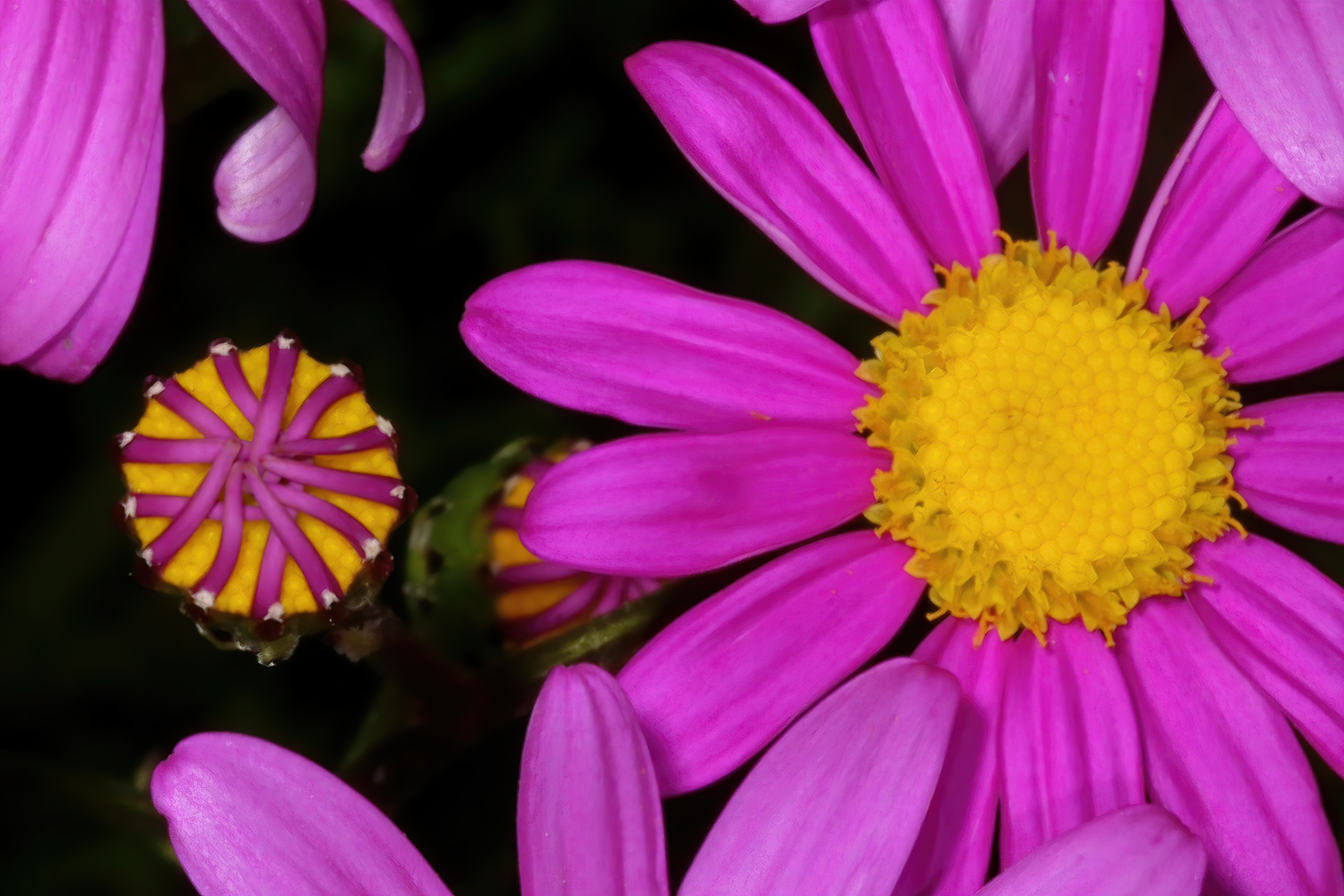
Senecio elegans flowerheads, Kirstenbosch National Botanical Garden, Cape Town, South Africa

Senecio elegans is a species of flowering plant in the aster family known by the common names redpurple ragwort, purple groundsel, wild cineraria and purple ragwort.

== Description ==
It is an annual herb producing a single, erect, branching stem which grows to a maximum height around 60 centimeters. The leaves have blades up to about 8 centimeters long which are deeply cut or divided into several toothed lobes. The herbage is somewhat hairy and glandular, sticky to the touch. The inflorescence bears flower heads lined with black-tipped phyllaries. They contain many yellowish disc florets at the center. Each has usually 13 ray florets 1 to 1.5 centimeters long which can be most any shade of red-purple.

== Distribution ==
It is endemic to the Cape Provinces of South Africa, and it is cultivated as an ornamental plant for its colorful flowers. It has been known to escape cultivation and become naturalized in areas of appropriate climate; it can be found growing wild in parts of New Zealand, Australia, the Azores, and on the Central Coast of California. It favors a Mediterranean climate, often on the coast.
