= Telanthophora grandifolia =

- Cultivated plant at the San Francisco Botanical Garden

Conservation status
- Least Concern (IUCN 3.1)

Scientific classification
- Kingdom: Plantae
- Clade: Tracheophytes
- Clade: Angiosperms
- Clade: Eudicots
- Clade: Asterids
- Order: Asterales
- Family: Asteraceae
- Genus: Telanthophora
- Species: T. grandifolia

Binomial name
- Telanthophora grandifolia (Less.) H.Rob. & Brettell

Synonyms
- Senecio arborescens Steetz; Senecio chicharrensis Greenm.; Senecio copeyensis Greenm.; Senecio ghiesbreghtii Regel; Senecio grandifolius Less.; Senecio serraquitchensis Greenm.; Telanthophora arborescens (Steetz) H.Rob. & Brettell; Telanthophora chicharrensis (Greenm.) H.Rob. & Brettell; Telanthophora copeyensis (Greenm.) H.Rob. & Brettell; Telanthophora grandifolia var. serraquitchensis (Greenm.) B.L.Clark; Telanthophora serraquitchensis (Greenm.) H.Rob. & Brettell

Species of flowering plant

Telanthophora grandifolia, commonly called the giant groundsel, is a species of flowering plant in the tribe Senecioneae of the family Asteraceae. It is a large shrub or small tree native from Mexico through Central America to Panama. The species is notable for its very large leaves, which may be nearly entire or deeply lobed.

== Description ==
Some individuals develop a single main trunk. The leaves are arranged alternately and have petioles 4–18 cm (1.6–7.1 in) long. The leaf blades are elliptic to ovate, measuring 13–50 cm (5.1–19.7 in) long and 7–30 cm (2.8–11.8 in) wide. They have 8–15 pairs of lateral veins. The upper surface is hairless, while the underside is initially sparsely covered in cobwebby hairs and may become hairless with age. The base varies from asymmetrically wedge-shaped to heart-shaped. The margins may be nearly entire but more commonly have two to seven lobes of variable depth; deeply divided leaves may be cut almost to the midrib.

The flower heads are borne in broad, corymb-like panicles measuring 10–30 cm (3.9–11.8 in) across. Each head has a cylindrical involucre composed of usually eight bracts, each 4–7 mm (0.16–0.28 in) long. There are generally one to six female yellow ray florets, although these are occasionally absent, and four to eleven bisexual yellow disc florets. The fruits are achenes 1–3 mm (0.039–0.118 in) long, with a pappus 4–7 mm (0.16–0.28 in) long.

Detail of the leaves

Detail of the stem

The flowers

The smooth bark

== Distribution and habitat ==
Telanthophora grandifolia is native to Mexico, Costa Rica, El Salvador, Guatemala, Honduras, Nicaragua and Panama. It occurs at elevations of approximately 500–2,500 m (1,600–8,200 ft). Its habitats include montane forest, pine–oak forest and oak forest, as well as stream banks, volcanic slopes and areas of secondary vegetation.

== Taxonomy ==
The species was first described by the German botanist Christian Friedrich Lessing in 1830 as Senecio grandifolius. In 1974, Harold E. Robinson and R. D. Brettell established the genus Telanthophora and transferred the species to it as Telanthophora grandifolia. The specific epithet grandifolia means “large-leaved”.

Plants of the World Online accepts T. grandifolia and treats several formerly recognized species—including Senecio arborescens, S. chicharrensis, S. copeyensis and S. serraquitchensis—as its synonyms.

== Conservation ==
The species is classified as Least Concern on the IUCN Red List.

A molecular phylogenetic analysis published in 2018 recovered Telanthophora as a monophyletic group, but found it nested within a non-monophyletic Roldana.
