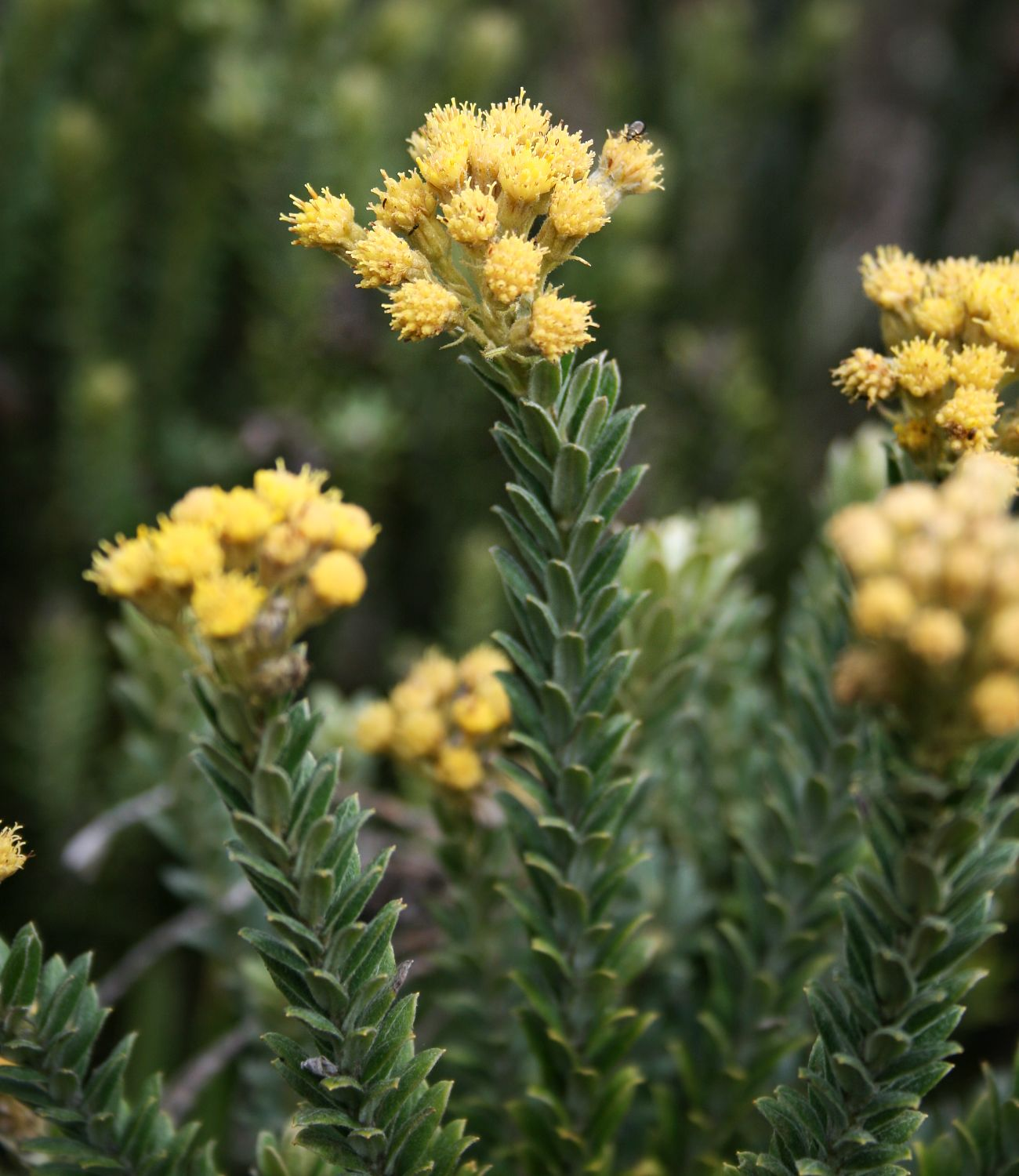
- Monticalia ledifolia

Scientific classification
- Kingdom: Plantae
- Clade: Tracheophytes
- Clade: Angiosperms
- Clade: Eudicots
- Clade: Asterids
- Order: Asterales
- Family: Asteraceae
- Subfamily: Asteroideae
- Tribe: Senecioneae
- Genus: Monticalia (Kunth) C.Jeffrey

= Monticalia =

Genus of flowering plants

Monticalia is a genus of flowering plants in the family Asteraceae.

Species include:

- Monticalia angustifolia
- Monticalia befarioides
- Monticalia empetroides
- Monticalia microdon
- Monticalia micropachyphyllus
- Monticalia mutisii
- Monticalia myrsinites
- Monticalia nitida
- Monticalia peruviana
- Monticalia pulchella
- Monticalia rosmarinifolia
- Monticalia stuebelii
- Monticalia teretifolia

== Taxonomy ==
The genus was described by Charles Jeffrey and published in Kew Bulletin 47: 69. 1992.
