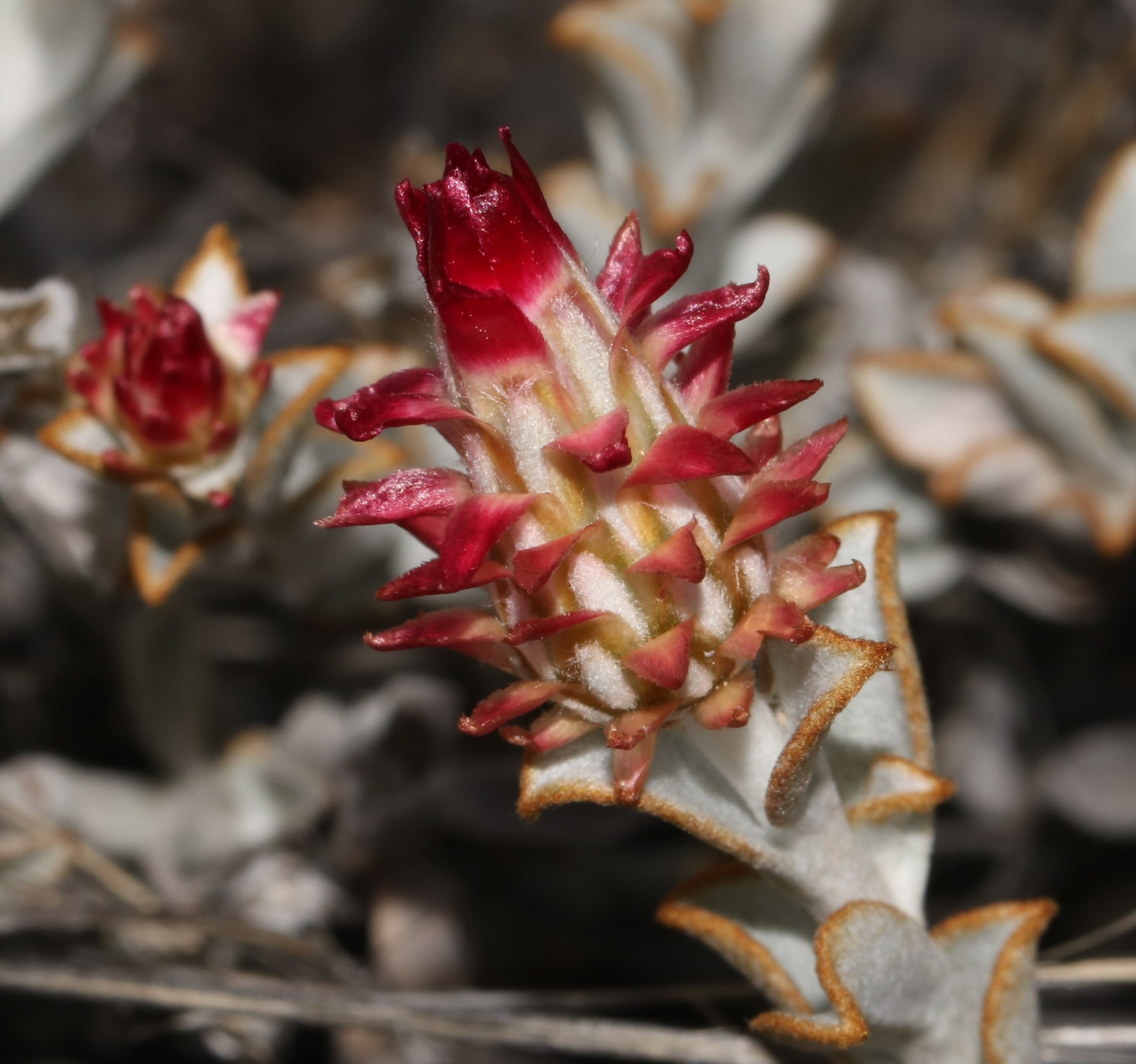

Scientific classification
- Kingdom: Plantae
- Clade: Tracheophytes
- Clade: Angiosperms
- Clade: Eudicots
- Clade: Asterids
- Order: Asterales
- Family: Asteraceae
- Genus: Syncarpha
- Species: S. dregeana

Binomial name
- Syncarpha dregeana (DC.) B. Nord.

Synonyms
- Syncarpha dregeanum DC. Syncarpha dregeanum (DC.) Kuntze

= Syncarpha dregeana =

Species of flowering plant

Syncarpa dregeana is a species of flowering plant. It belongs to the genus Syncarpha.
