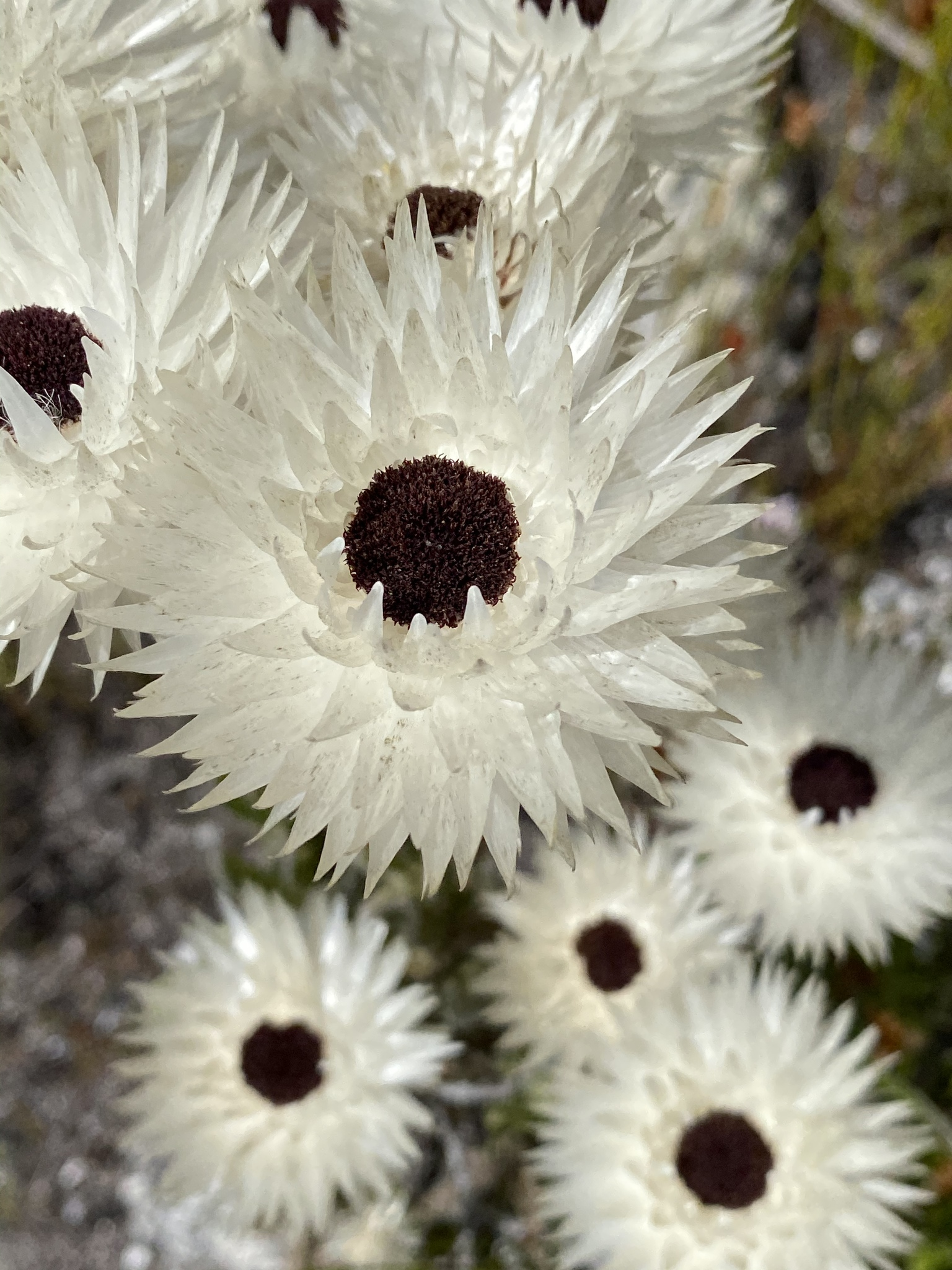

Scientific classification
- Kingdom: Plantae
- Clade: Tracheophytes
- Clade: Angiosperms
- Clade: Eudicots
- Clade: Asterids
- Order: Asterales
- Family: Asteraceae
- Genus: Syncarpha
- Species: S. zeyheri

Binomial name
- Syncarpha zeyheri (Sond.) B. Nord.

Synonyms
- Syncarpha brachypterum Levyns

= Syncarpha zeyheri =

Species of flowering plant

Syncarpa zeyheri is a species of flowering plant. It belongs to the genus Syncarpha.
