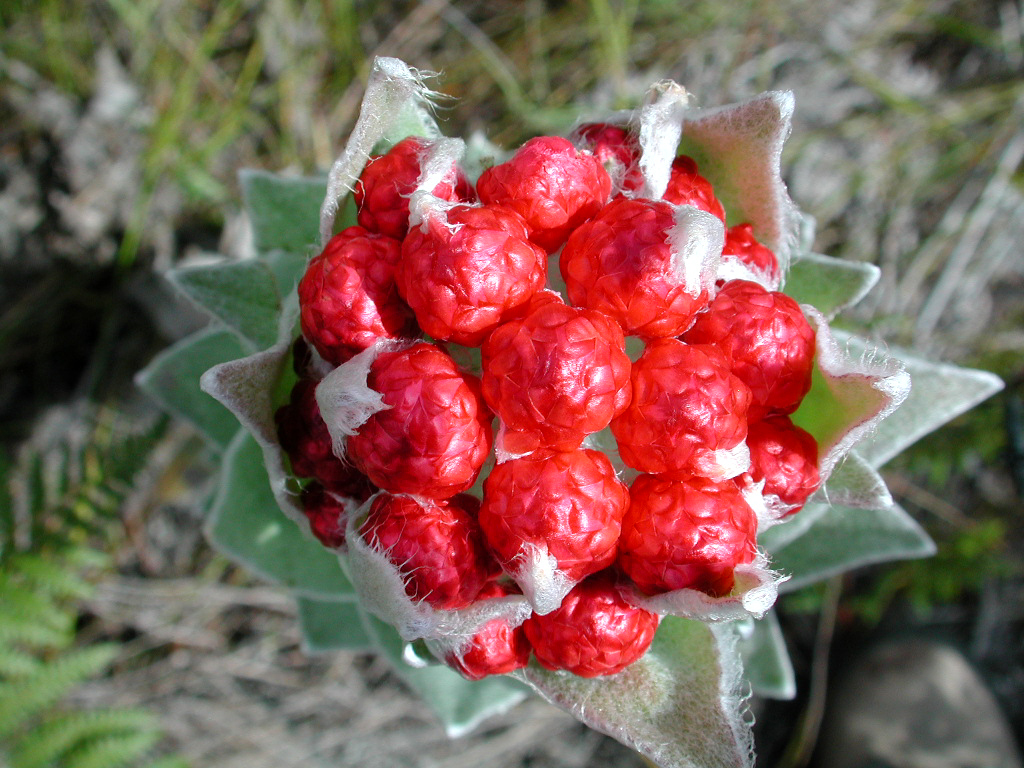

Scientific classification
- Kingdom: Plantae
- Clade: Tracheophytes
- Clade: Angiosperms
- Clade: Eudicots
- Clade: Asterids
- Order: Asterales
- Family: Asteraceae
- Genus: Syncarpha
- Species: S. eximia

Binomial name
- Syncarpha eximia (L.) B.Nord.

= Syncarpha eximia =

Species of flowering plant

Syncarpa eximia, the strawberry everlasting, is a genus of flowering plants. It belongs to the genus Syncarpha, and is in the family Asteraceae.

Syncarpha eximia is a striking perennial shrub endemic to the Cape Floristic Region of South Africa, particularly within the Cape Provinces. Known as the strawberry everlasting, it is distinguished by its large, hemispherical flower heads featuring deep crimson or pink papery bracts that resemble strawberries before they fully open. These "everlasting" bracts are dry and scarious, allowing the flower heads to retain their vibrant color long after being cut or dried. The plant typically features silvery-grey foliage covered in fine, silky hairs, an adaptation that helps it conserve moisture in its Mediterranean-style climate. It is primarily found in fynbos habitats, often growing in rocky sandstone soils on mountain slopes where it can receive full sunlight.
