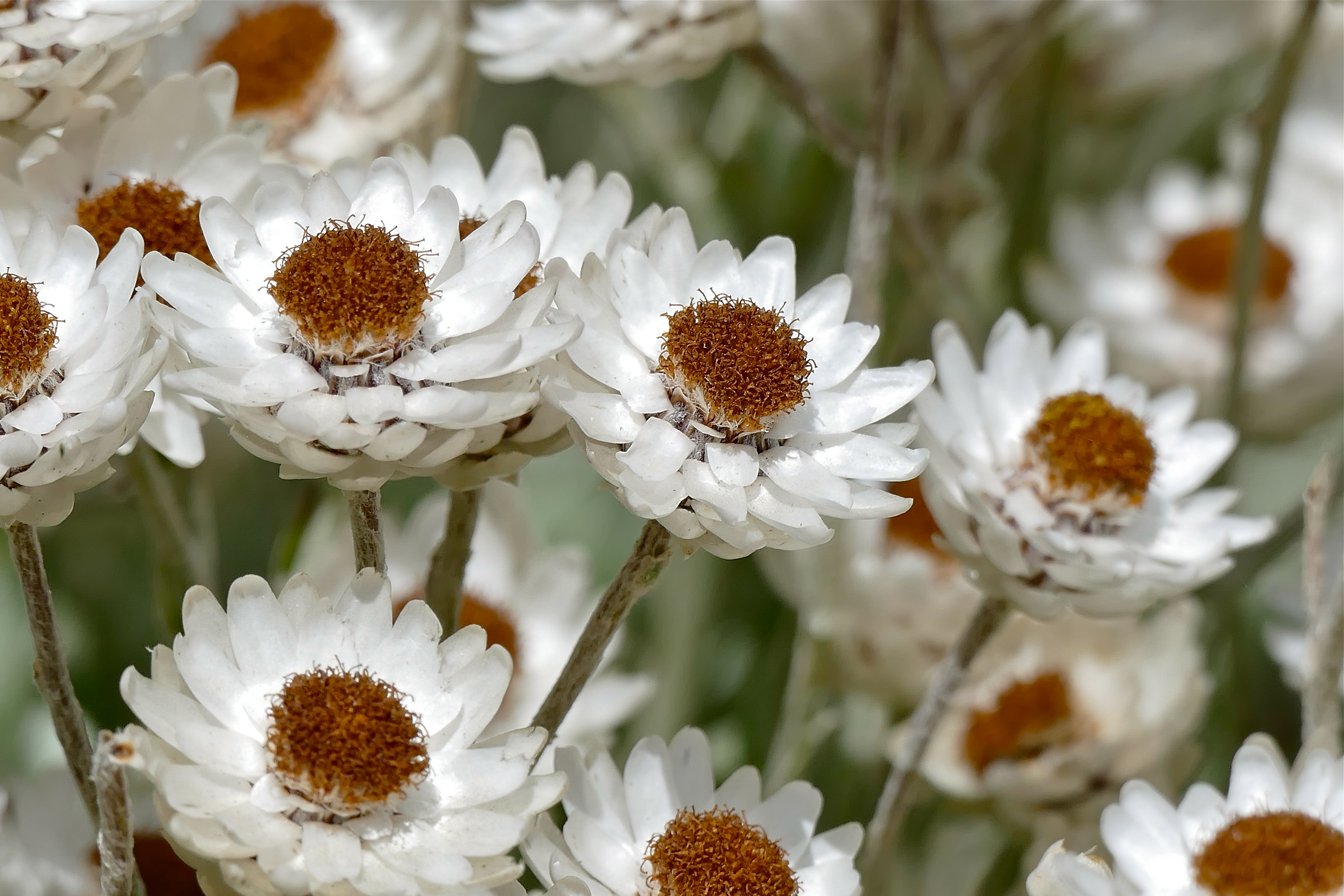

Scientific classification
- Kingdom: Plantae
- Clade: Tracheophytes
- Clade: Angiosperms
- Clade: Eudicots
- Clade: Asterids
- Order: Asterales
- Family: Asteraceae
- Genus: Syncarpha
- Species: S. argyropsis

Binomial name
- Syncarpha argyropsis (DC.) B. Nord.

Synonyms
- Syncarpha argyropse (DC.) Kuntze; Syncarpha argyreum St. Lag.

= Syncarpha argyropsis =

Species of flowering plant

Syncarpha argyropsis is a species of flowering plant found on the south coast of South Africa. It was first described as Helipterum argyropsis by DC. in 1838, and given the current name by Rune Bertil Nordenstam in 1989. Syncarpha argyropsis belongs to the genus Syncarpha and family Asteraceae.
