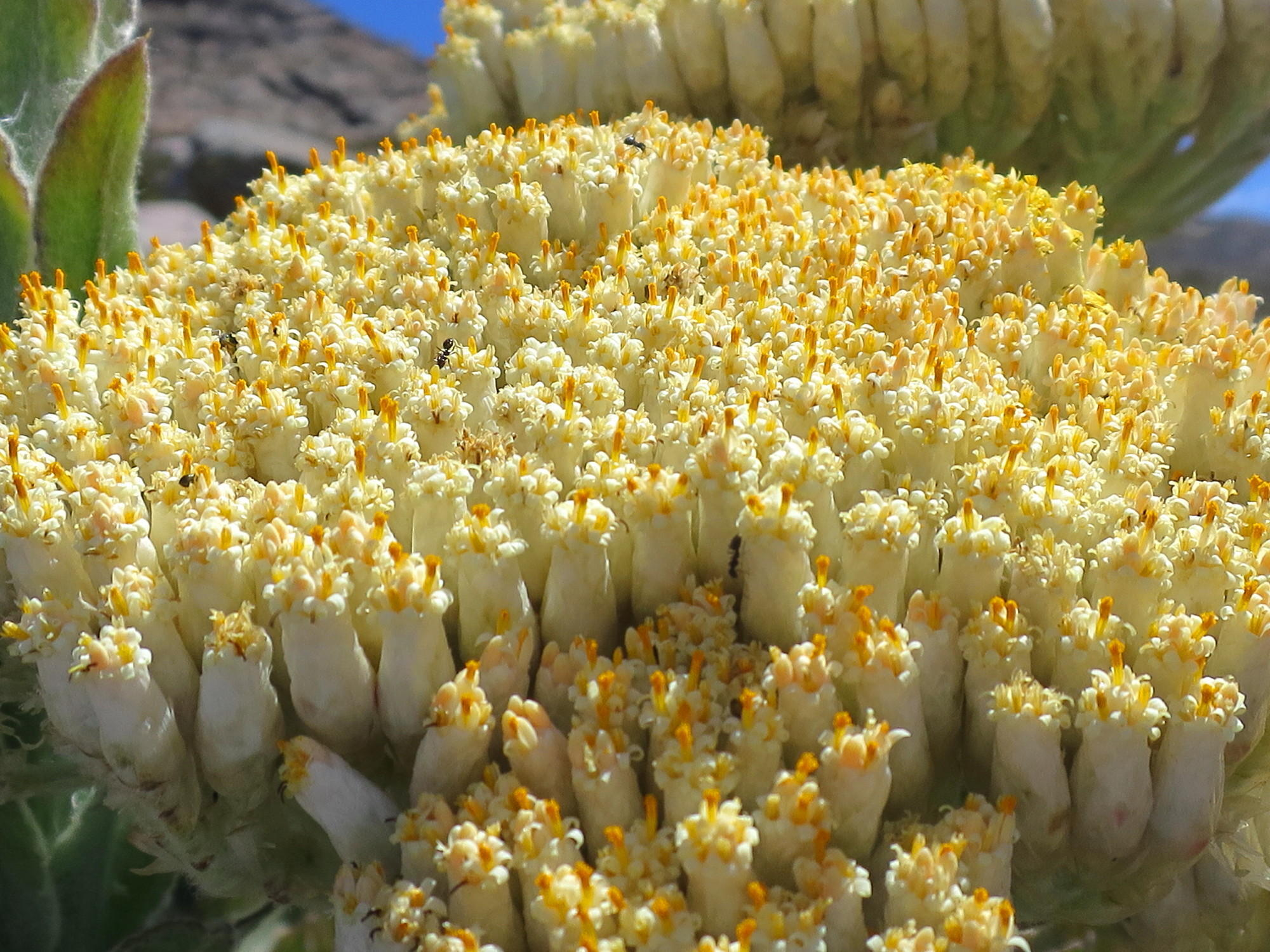

Scientific classification
- Kingdom: Plantae
- Clade: Tracheophytes
- Clade: Angiosperms
- Clade: Eudicots
- Clade: Asterids
- Order: Asterales
- Family: Asteraceae
- Genus: Syncarpha
- Species: S. milleflora

Binomial name
- Syncarpha milleflora (L. fil.) B. Nord., 1989

Synonyms
- Syncarpha phlomoides (Lam.) DC. Syncarpha milleflorum (L. fil.) Druce; Syncarpha phlomoides (Lam.) Spreng. Syncarpha phlomoides Lam. Syncarpha milleflorum L. fil. Syncarpha milleflorum (L. fil.) D. Don

= Syncarpha milleflora =

Species of flowering plant

Syncarpha milleflora is a species of flowering plant. It belongs to the genus Syncarpha, and family Asteraceae. It is endemic to the Cape Provinces of South Africa.
