= Syncarpha virgata =

Scientific classification
- Kingdom: Plantae
- Clade: Tracheophytes
- Clade: Angiosperms
- Clade: Eudicots
- Clade: Asterids
- Order: Asterales
- Family: Asteraceae
- Genus: Syncarpha
- Species: S. virgata

Binomial name
- Syncarpha virgata (Berg.) B. Nord.

Synonyms
- Syncarpha virgatum (Berg.) DC. Syncarpha virgatum (Berg.) Willd. Syncarpha virgatum (Berg.) G. Don; Syncarpha virgatum (Berg.) Kuntze

Species of flowering plant

Syncarpa virgata is a species of flowering plant. It belongs to the genus Syncarpha.
