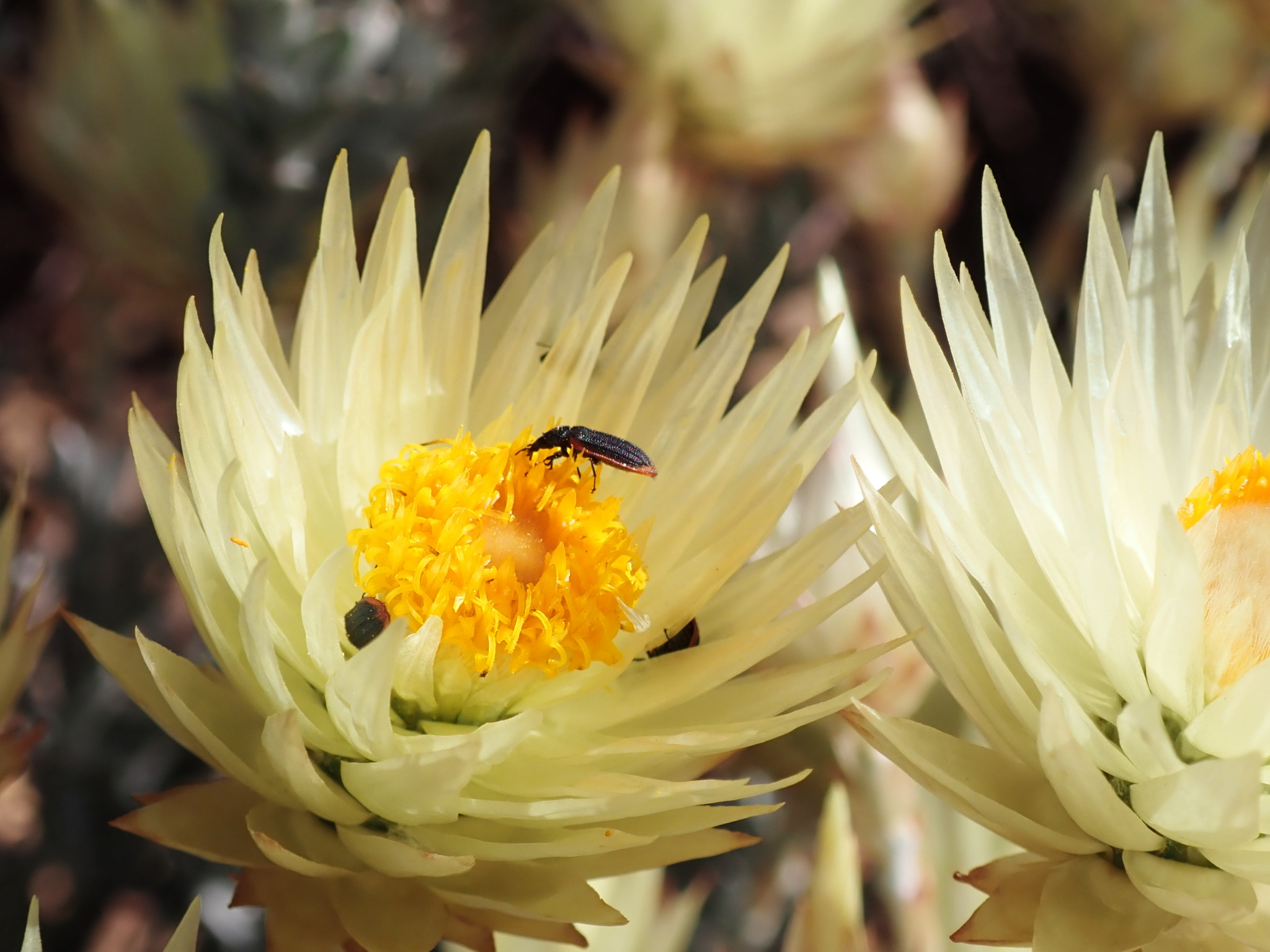

Scientific classification
- Kingdom: Plantae
- Clade: Tracheophytes
- Clade: Angiosperms
- Clade: Eudicots
- Clade: Asterids
- Order: Asterales
- Family: Asteraceae
- Genus: Syncarpha
- Species: S. ferruginea

Binomial name
- Syncarpha ferruginea (Lam.) B. Nord.

Synonyms
- Syncarpha ferrugineum Lam. Syncarpha spinulosum Turcz. Syncarpha ferrugineum (Lam.) Harv. & Sond. Syncarpha ferrugineum (Lam.) Wendl. Syncarpha crassifolium D. Don

= Syncarpha ferruginea =

Species of flowering plant

Syncarpa ferruginea is a species of flowering plant. It belongs to the genus Syncarpha.
