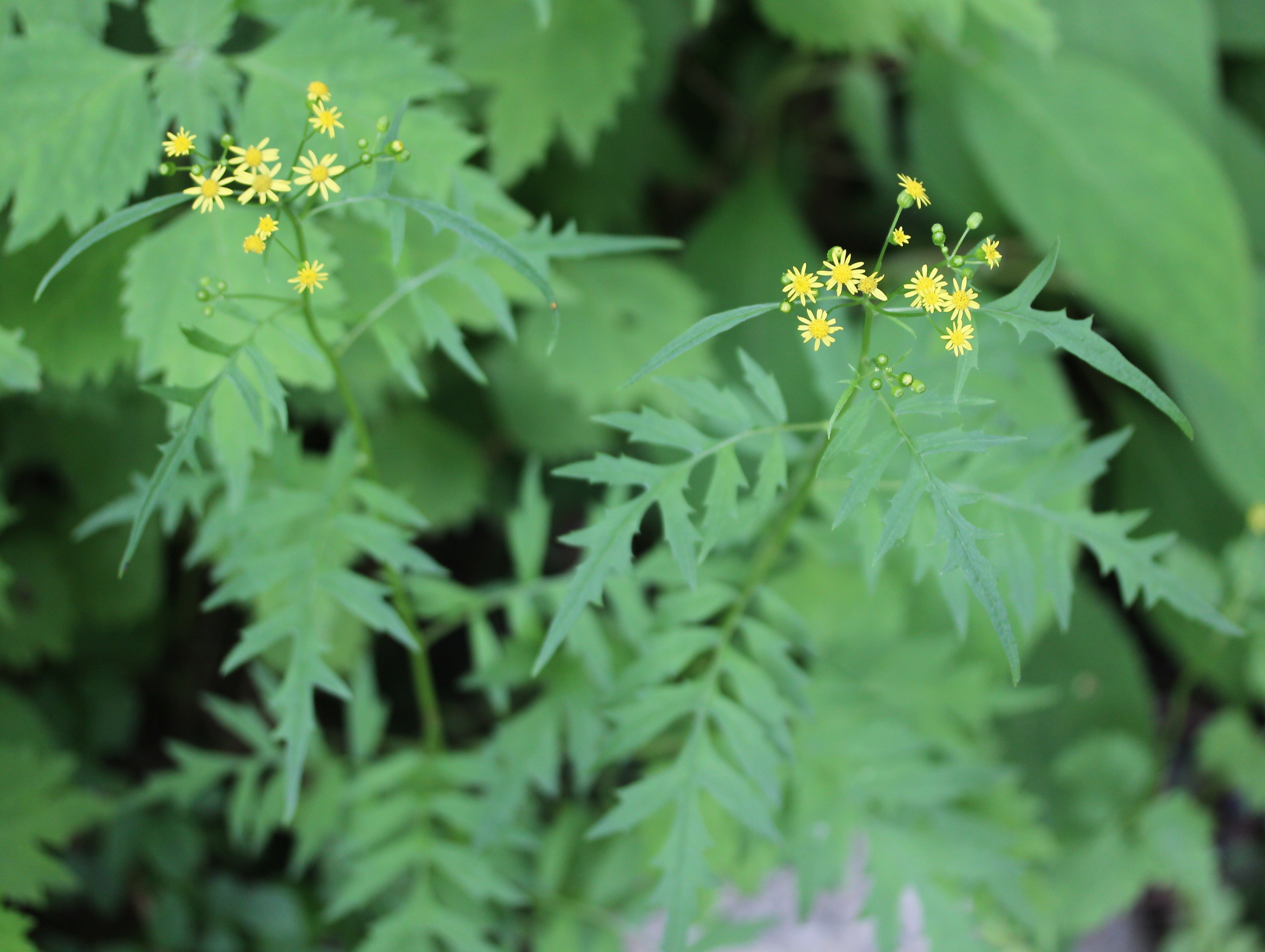
- Nemosenecio nikoensis

Scientific classification
- Kingdom: Plantae
- Clade: Tracheophytes
- Clade: Angiosperms
- Clade: Eudicots
- Clade: Asterids
- Order: Asterales
- Family: Asteraceae
- Subfamily: Asteroideae
- Tribe: Senecioneae
- Genus: Nemosenecio (Kitam.) B.Nord.

Synonyms
- Senecio sect. Nemosenecio Kitam.

= Nemosenecio =

Genus of flowering plants

Nemosenecio is a genus of East Asian flowering plants in the groundsel tribe within the sunflower family.

Species

- Nemosenecio concinnus (Franch.) C.Jeffrey & Y.L.Chen - Sichuan, Chongqing
- Nemosenecio formosanus (Kitam.) B.Nord. - Taiwan
- Nemosenecio incisifolius (Jeffrey) B.Nord. - Yunnan
- Nemosenecio nikoensis (Miq.) B.Nord. - Japan
- Nemosenecio solenoides (Dunn) B.Nord. - Yunnan
- Nemosenecio yunnanensis B.Nord. - Guizhou, Yunnan
