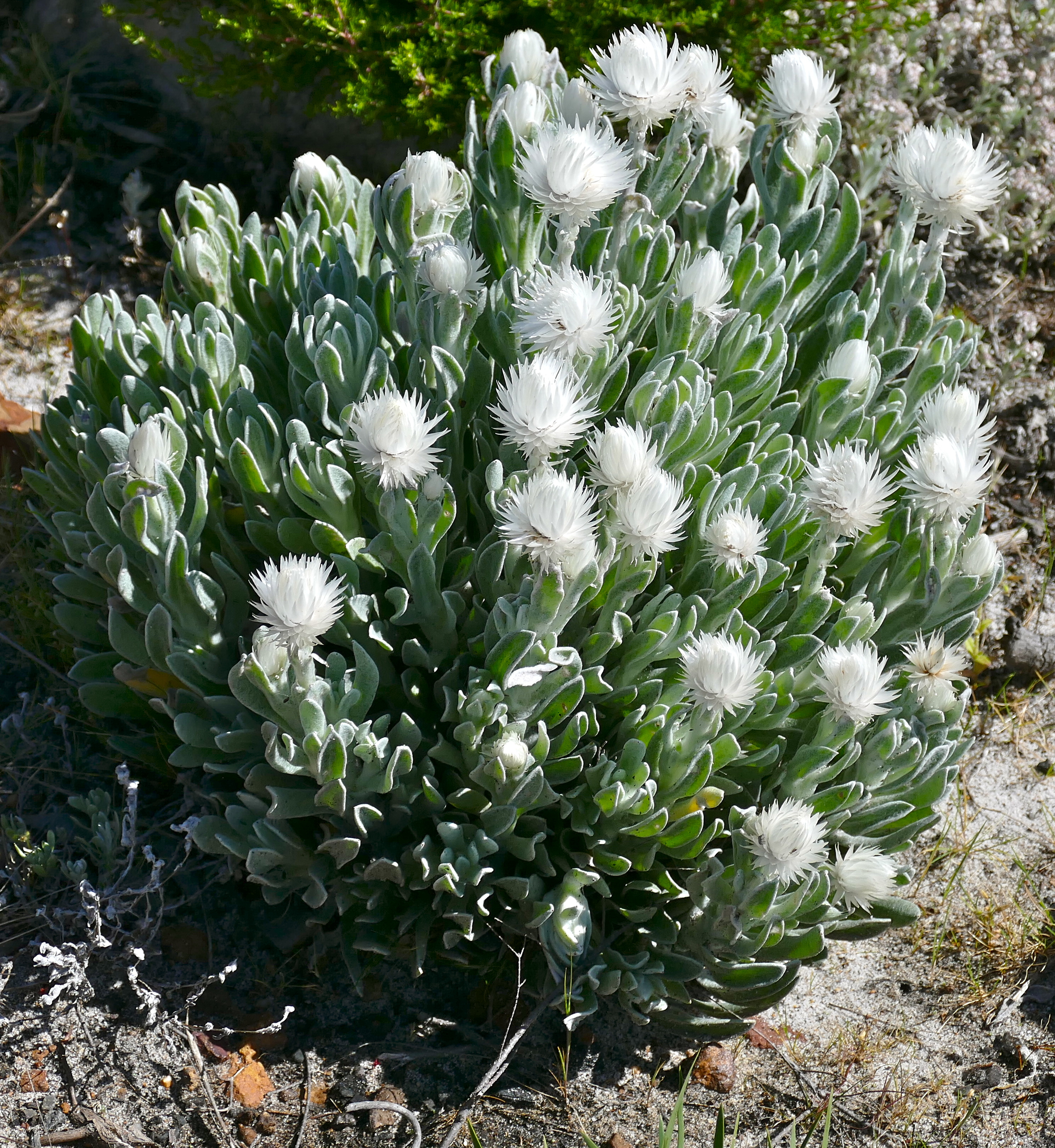

Scientific classification
- Kingdom: Plantae
- Clade: Tracheophytes
- Clade: Angiosperms
- Clade: Eudicots
- Clade: Asterids
- Order: Asterales
- Family: Asteraceae
- Genus: Syncarpha
- Species: S. vestita

Binomial name
- Syncarpha vestita (L.) B. Nord. (1989)

Synonyms
- Gnaphalium acilepis DC. (1838); Gnaphalium vestitum Sch.Bip. (1845); Helichrysum lanatum Schrank (1821-1822 publ. 1824); Helichrysum speciosum Thunb. (1823); Helichrysum vestitum Schrank (1821-1822 publ. 1824); Leucostemma lingulatum D.Don (1826); Leucostemma vestitum D.Don (1826); Xeranthemum vestitum L. (1753)

= Syncarpha vestita =

Species of flowering plant

Syncarpha vestita is a species of flowering plant. It belongs to the genus Syncarpha, and family Asteraceae. It is endemic to the Cape Provinces of South Africa.
