= Syncarpha dykei =

Scientific classification
- Kingdom: Plantae
- Clade: Tracheophytes
- Clade: Angiosperms
- Clade: Eudicots
- Clade: Asterids
- Order: Asterales
- Family: Asteraceae
- Genus: Syncarpha
- Species: S. dykei

Binomial name
- Syncarpha dykei (H. Bol) B. Nord.

Species of flowering plant

Syncarpa dykei is a species of flowering plant. It belongs to the genus Syncarpha.
