= Syncarpha affinis =

Scientific classification
- Kingdom: Plantae
- Clade: Tracheophytes
- Clade: Angiosperms
- Clade: Eudicots
- Clade: Asterids
- Order: Asterales
- Family: Asteraceae
- Genus: Syncarpha
- Species: S. affinis

Binomial name
- Syncarpha affinis (B. Nord.) B. Nord.

Synonyms
- Syncarpha citrinum (Less.) Harv. & Sond. Syncarpha affine B. Nord. Syncarpha citrinum Less. ex Harv. & Sond. Syncarpha citrinum (Less.) Kuntze

Species of flowering plant

Syncarpha affinis is a species of flowering plant. It belongs to the genus Syncarpha.
