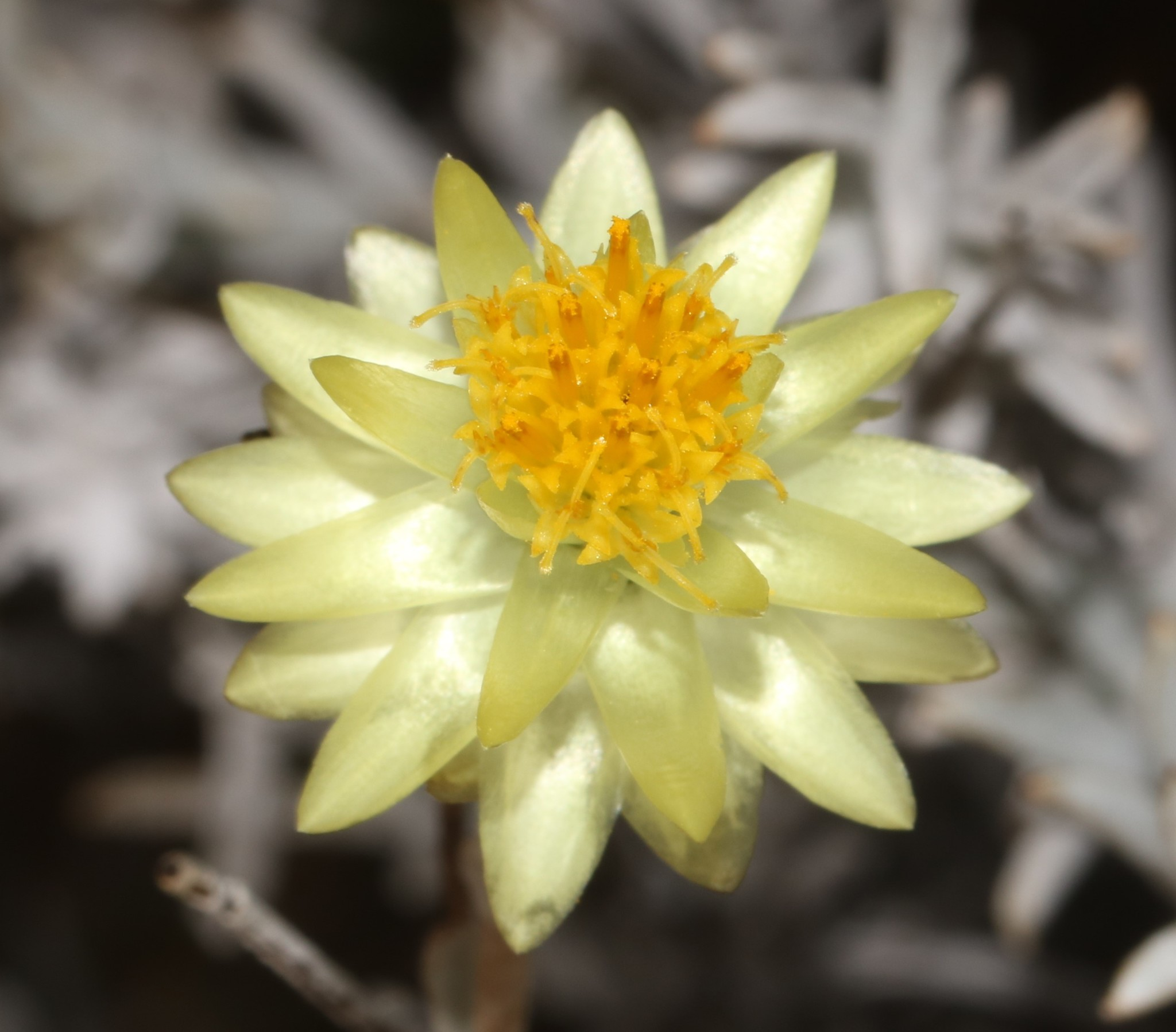

Scientific classification
- Kingdom: Plantae
- Clade: Tracheophytes
- Clade: Angiosperms
- Clade: Eudicots
- Clade: Asterids
- Order: Asterales
- Family: Asteraceae
- Genus: Syncarpha
- Species: S. staehelina

Binomial name
- Syncarpha staehelina (L.) B. Nord.

Synonyms
- Syncarpha virgatum Berg. Syncarpha pauciflora Sims

= Syncarpha staehelina =

Species of flowering plant

Syncarpa staehelina is a species of flowering plant. It belongs to the genus Syncarpha.
