= Leonis trineura =

Scientific classification
- Kingdom: Plantae
- Clade: Tracheophytes
- Clade: Angiosperms
- Clade: Eudicots
- Clade: Asterids
- Order: Asterales
- Family: Asteraceae
- Tribe: Senecioneae
- Subtribe: Senecioninae
- Genus: Leonis; B.Nord.
- Species: L. trineura

Binomial name
- Leonis trineura (Griseb.) B.Nord.

Synonyms
- Pentacalia trineura (Griseb.) Borhidi; Senecio domingensis Urb.; Senecio leonis Britton; Senecio trineurus Griseb. (1862) (basionym)

Species of flowering plant

Leonis trineura is a species of flowering plant in the family Asteraceae which is native to Cuba and Hispaniola. It is the sole member of genus Leonis.
