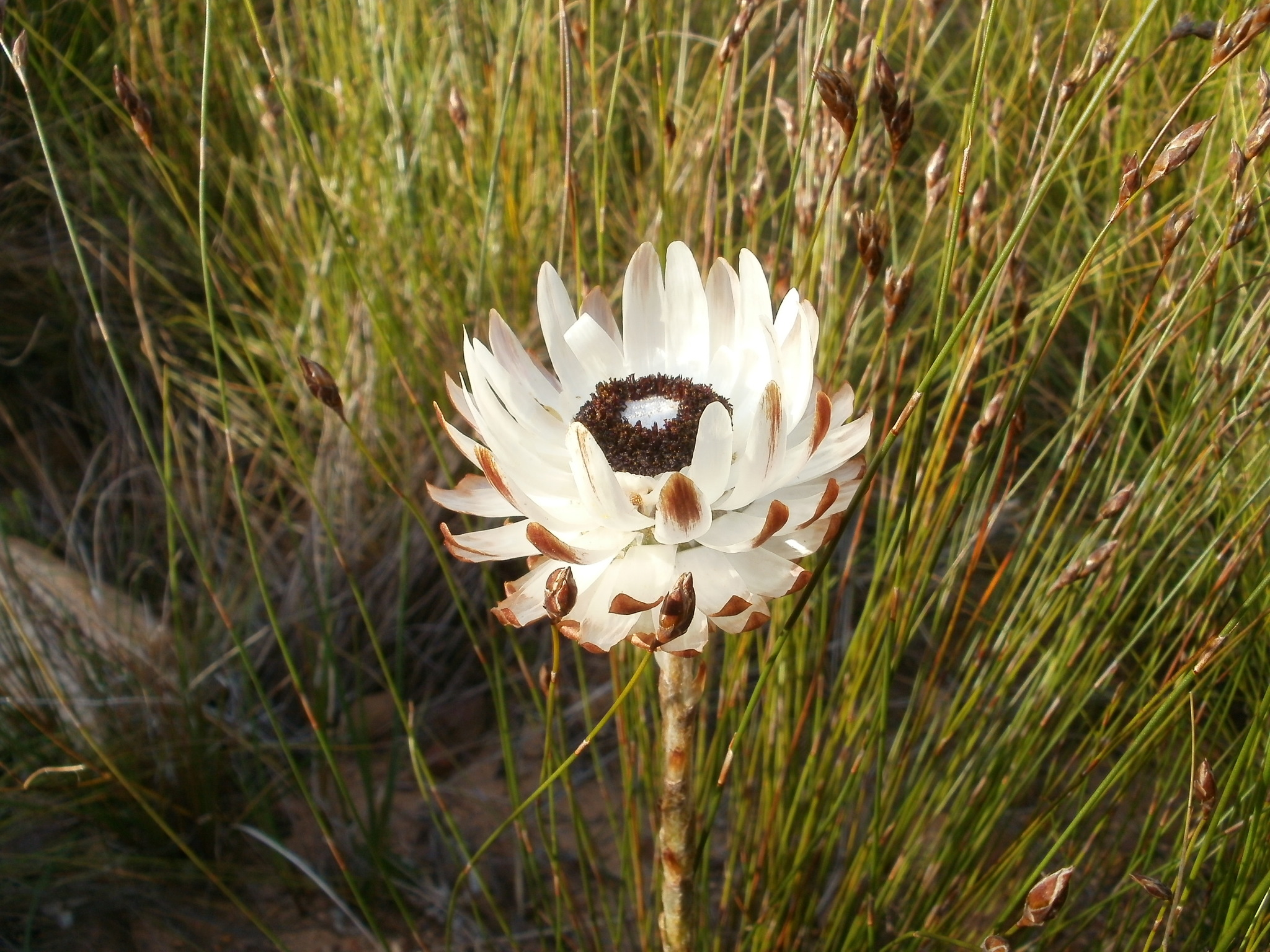

Scientific classification
- Kingdom: Plantae
- Clade: Tracheophytes
- Clade: Angiosperms
- Clade: Eudicots
- Clade: Asterids
- Order: Asterales
- Family: Asteraceae
- Genus: Syncarpha
- Species: S. variegata

Binomial name
- Syncarpha variegata (Berg.) B. Nord., 1989

Synonyms
- Syncarpha variegatum Berg. Syncarpha vestitum Steud. Syncarpha spirale Andr. Syncarpha vestitum Willd. Syncarpha variegatum (Berg.) Thunb. Syncarpha spirale (Andr.) Willd. Syncarpha cernua Cass. Syncarpha variegatum (Berg.) D. Don; Syncarpha spirale (Andr.) G. Don; Syncarpha variegatum (Berg.) Kuntze; Syncarpha variegatum (Berg.) DC.

= Syncarpha variegata =

Species of flowering plant

Syncarpha variegata is a species of flowering plant. It belongs to the genus Syncarpha, and family Asteraceae. It is endemic to the Cape Provinces of South Africa.
