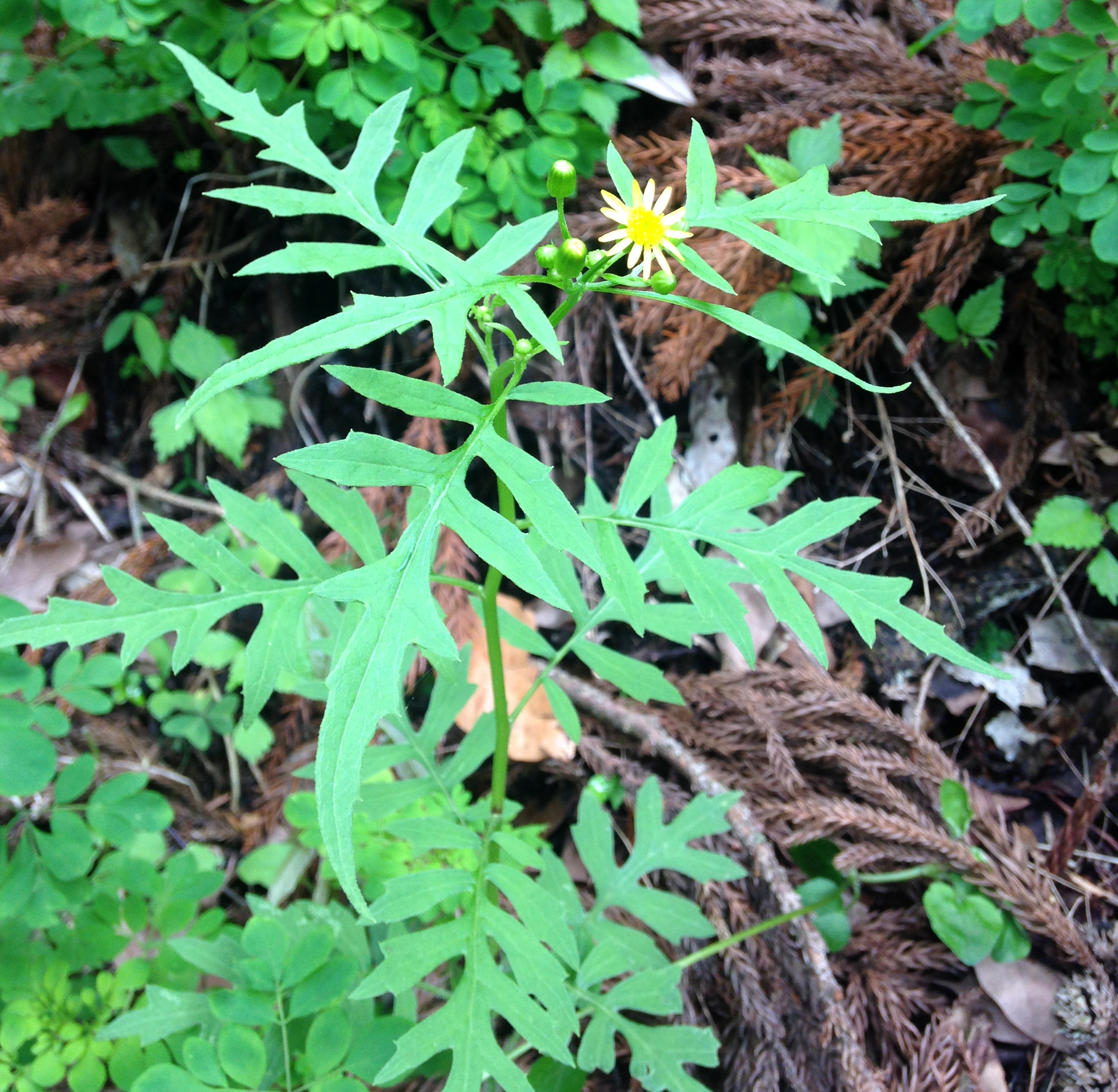

Scientific classification
- Kingdom: Plantae
- Clade: Tracheophytes
- Clade: Angiosperms
- Clade: Eudicots
- Clade: Asterids
- Order: Asterales
- Family: Asteraceae
- Genus: Nemosenecio
- Species: N. nikoensis

Binomial name
- Nemosenecio nikoensis (Miq.) B.Nord.

= Nemosenecio nikoensis =

Species of flowering plant

Nemosenecio nikoensis is a species of flowering plant in the aster family (Asteraceae). It is endemic to Japan, where it is widespread and found on all four main islands. Its natural habitat is in wet forests in the mountains, where it grows along streamsides.

Nemosenecio nikoensis is an stoloniferous perennial, growing to around 1 meter tall. It leaves are deeply divided. It produces numerous heads of yellow flowers, which are around 12 mm across. It blooms from May to August.

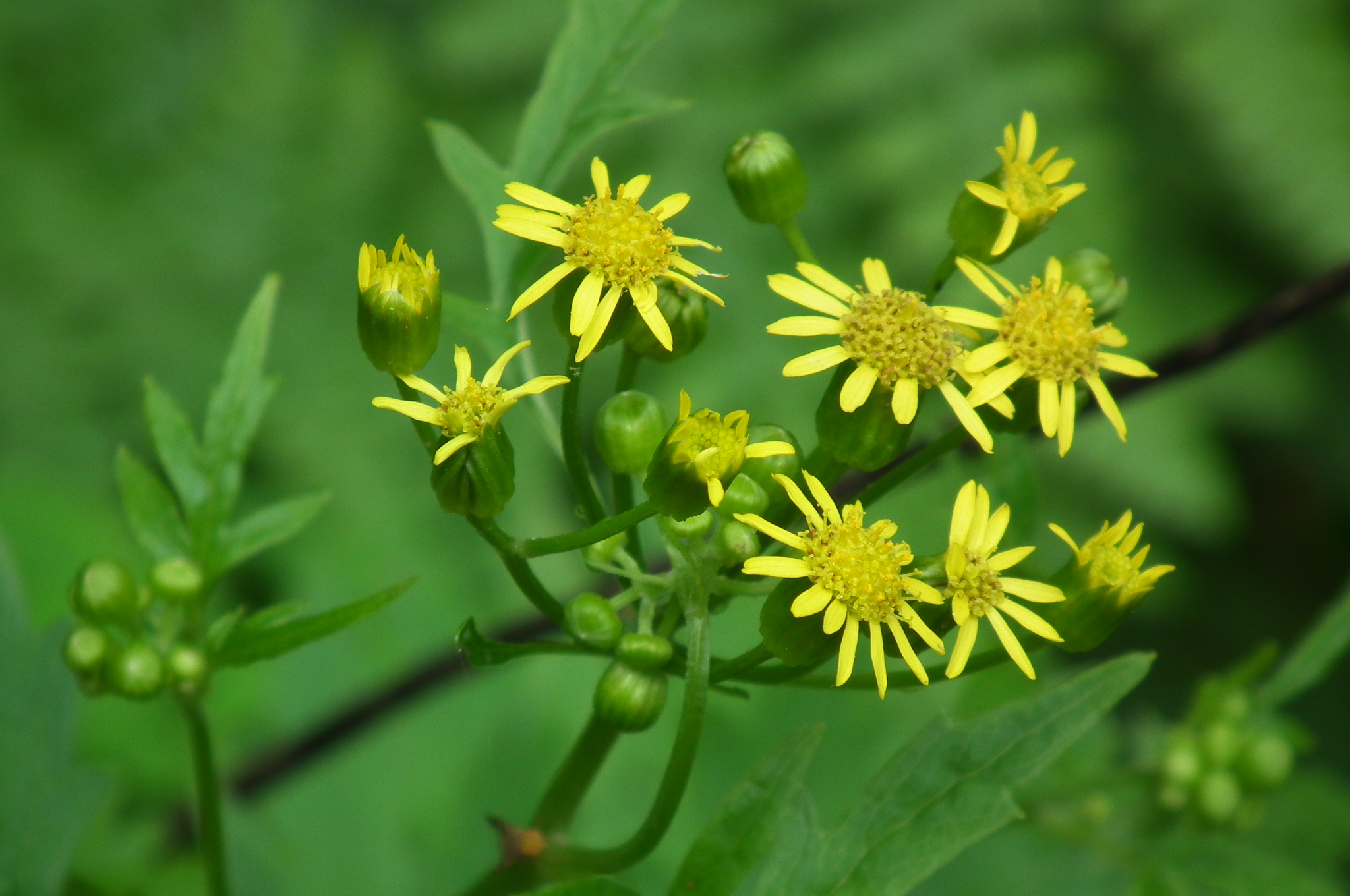
Detail of flowering heads
