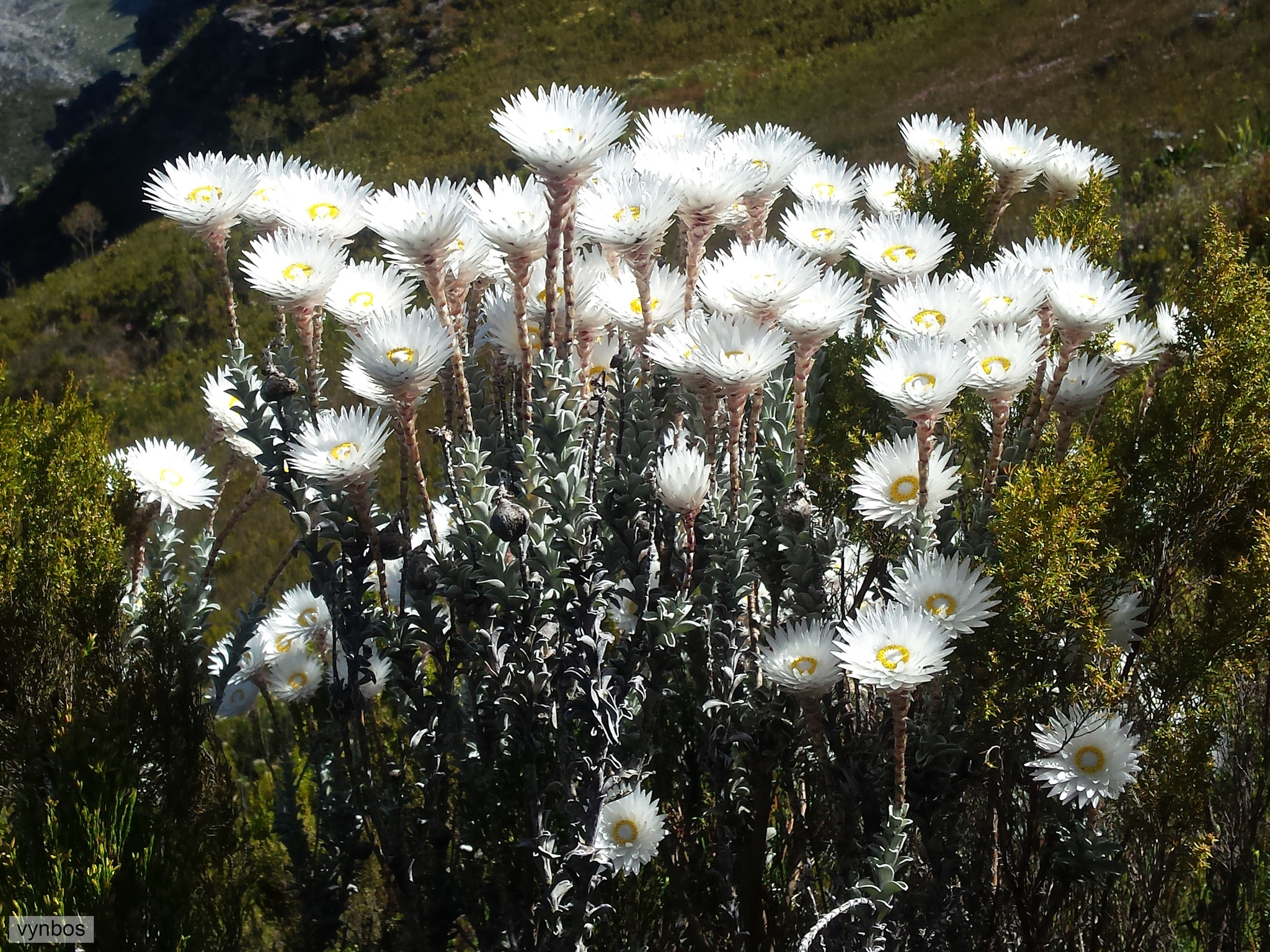

Scientific classification
- Kingdom: Plantae
- Clade: Tracheophytes
- Clade: Angiosperms
- Clade: Eudicots
- Clade: Asterids
- Order: Asterales
- Family: Asteraceae
- Genus: Syncarpha
- Species: S. lepidopodium

Binomial name
- Syncarpha lepidopodium (H. Bol.) B. Nord.

= Syncarpha lepidopodium =

Species of flowering plant

Syncarpha lepidopodium is a species of flowering plant. It belongs to the genus Syncarpha, and family Asteraceae. It is endemic to the Cape Provinces of South Africa.
