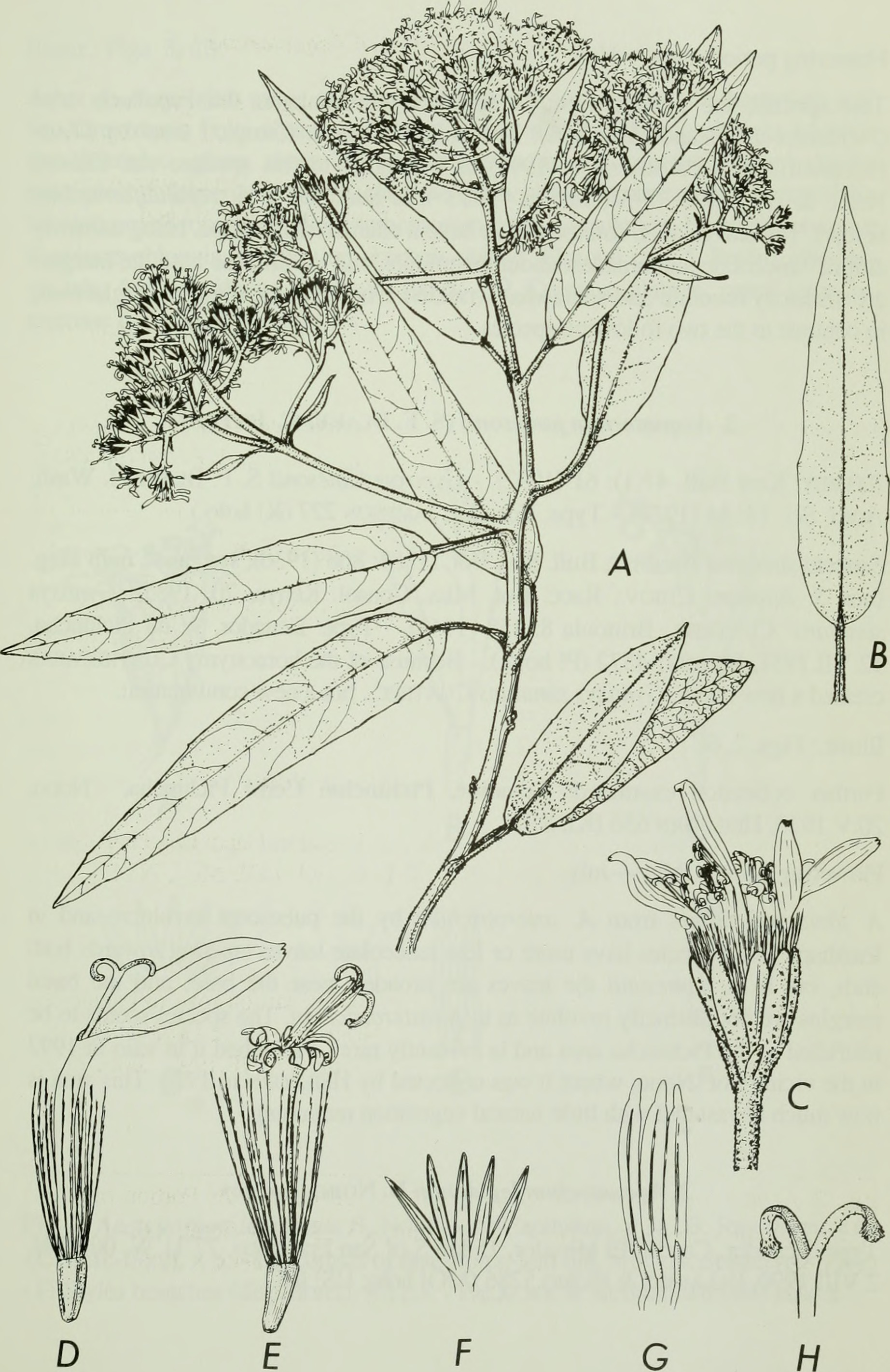

Conservation status
- Vulnerable (IUCN 3.1)

Scientific classification
- Kingdom: Plantae
- Clade: Tracheophytes
- Clade: Angiosperms
- Clade: Eudicots
- Clade: Asterids
- Order: Asterales
- Family: Asteraceae
- Genus: Aequatorium
- Species: A. jamesonii

Binomial name
- Aequatorium jamesonii (S.F.Blake) C.Jeffrey

= Aequatorium jamesonii =

Species of flowering plant

Aequatorium jamesonii is a species of flowering plant in the family Asteraceae. It is found only in Ecuador. Its natural habitat is subtropical or tropical moist montane forests. It is threatened by habitat loss.
