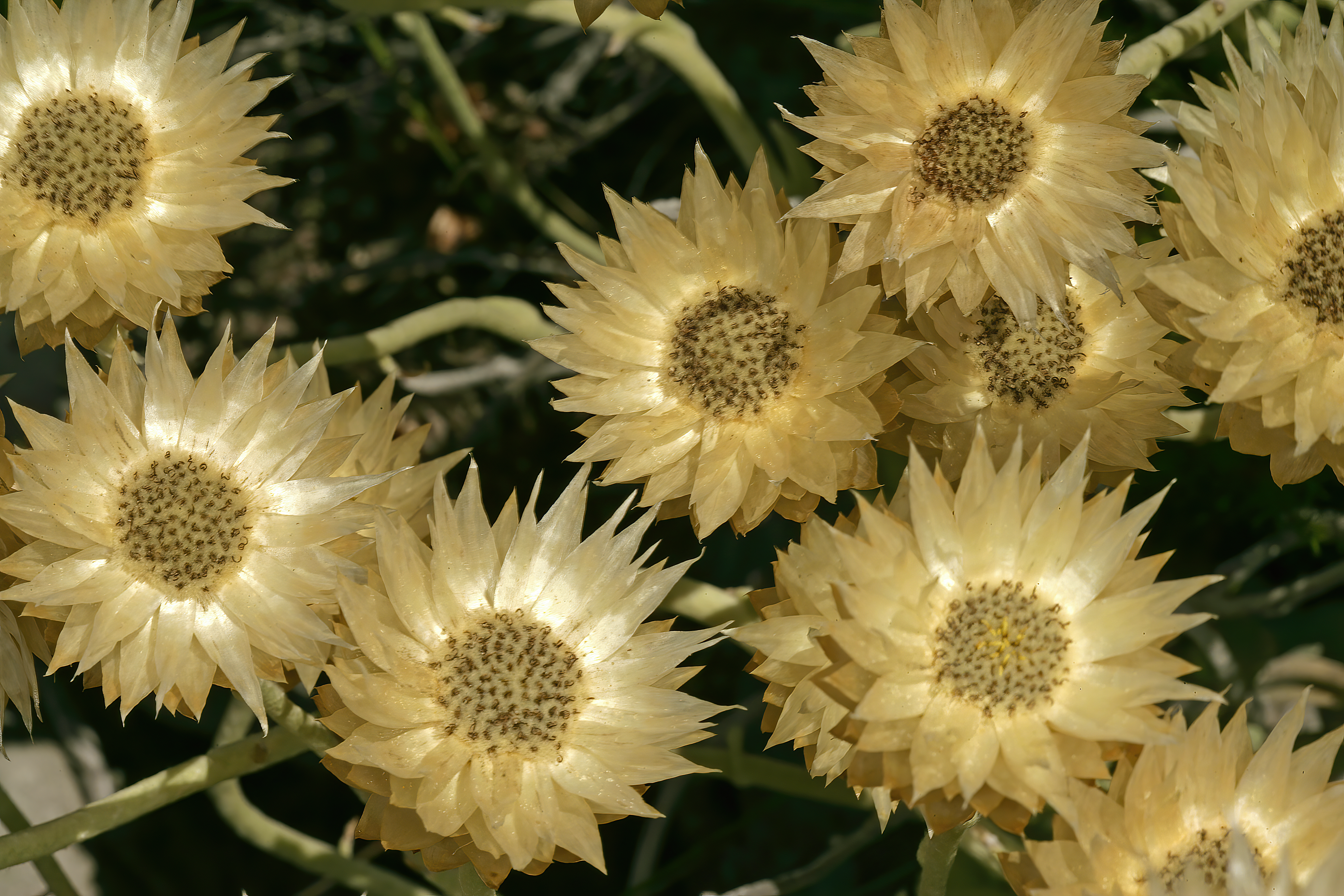
- Dry flowers of the Cape everlasting

Scientific classification
- Kingdom: Plantae
- Clade: Tracheophytes
- Clade: Angiosperms
- Clade: Eudicots
- Clade: Asterids
- Order: Asterales
- Family: Asteraceae
- Genus: Syncarpha
- Species: S. speciosissima

Binomial name
- Syncarpha speciosissima (L.) B.Nord.

Subspecies
- Syncarpha speciosissima subsp. angustifolia (DC.) B.Nord.; Syncarpha speciosissima subsp. speciosissima (L.) B.Nord.

Synonyms
- Argyrocome ferruginea Schrank; Argyrocome seminuda Schrank; Argyrocome seminula Schrank; Argyrocome speciosissimum (L.) Kuntze; Astelma speciosissimum (L.) D.Don; Astelma staehelina D.Don; Helichrysum grandiflorum Eckl.; Helichrysum grandiflorum Eckl. ex DC.; Helichrysum speciosissimum (L.) Willd.; Helichrysum staehelina Thunb.; Helipterum glabratum Sond.; Helipterum seminudum (Schrank) Sch.Bip.; Helipterum speciosissimum (L.) DC.; Helipterum speciosissimum subsp. angustifolium DC.; Helipterum speciosissimum var. angustifolium DC.; Helipterum speciosissimum var. speciosissimum; Xeranthemum speciosissimum L.; Xeranthemum speciosum Thunb.

= Syncarpha speciosissima =

South African plant species

Syncarpha speciosissima, the Cape everlasting or Cape sewejaartjie, is a species of plant primarily found in the Cape Floristic Region of South Africa.

== Description ==
Syncarpha speciosissima is a shrublet with erect stems that grows to be 20–60 cm (7.9–23.6 in) tall. It is covered in white wooly hairs and produces new shoots every year. The light grey-green leaves are held close to the base of the stem and are oblong or linear in shape.

Disc-shaped flower heads are borne on the ends of long stems between July and January. They have a diameter of 3–4 cm (1.2–1.6 in). The center starts off yellow, turning brown with age. The flower is surrounded by sharply pointed petal-like bracts. They have a papery texture and are white or cream in colour.

== Distribution and habitat ==
This species in endemic to the Western Cape of South Africa, where it grows on sandstone slopes between the Cape Peninsula and Tradouws Pass. It prefers the upper slopes of mountains and grows in open areas between bushes.
