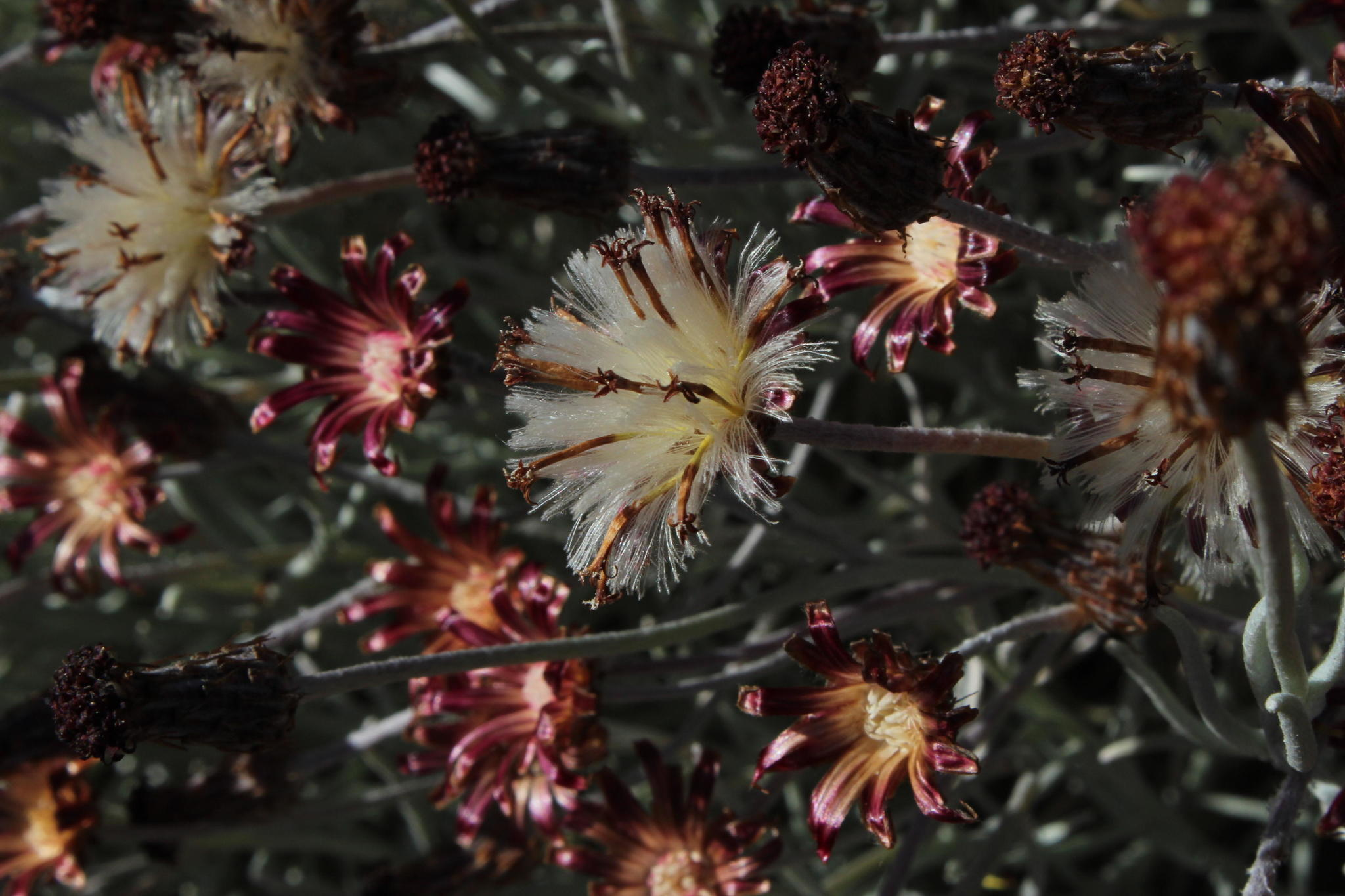

Scientific classification
- Kingdom: Plantae
- Clade: Tracheophytes
- Clade: Angiosperms
- Clade: Eudicots
- Clade: Asterids
- Order: Asterales
- Family: Asteraceae
- Genus: Syncarpha
- Species: S. gnaphaloides

Binomial name
- Syncarpha gnaphaloides (L.) DC.

Synonyms
- Syncarpha staehelinoides Steud. Syncarpha squarrosa (Thunb.) Rafin. Syncarpha modesta (Hook.) G. Don; Syncarpha squarrosa Thunb. Syncarpha modestus (Hook.) Heynh. Syncarpha staehelinoides Less. Syncarpha modestum Hook. Syncarpha modestum (Hook.) Forbes; Syncarpha gnaphalodes (L.) Kuntze

= Syncarpha gnaphaloides =

Species of flowering plant

Syncarpha gnaphaloides is a species of flowering plant. It belongs to the genus Syncarpha, and family Asteraceae and is endemic to the Cape Provinces of South Africa.
