= Aequatorium lepidotum =

Conservation status
- Endangered (IUCN 3.1)

Scientific classification
- Kingdom: Plantae
- Clade: Tracheophytes
- Clade: Angiosperms
- Clade: Eudicots
- Clade: Asterids
- Order: Asterales
- Family: Asteraceae
- Genus: Aequatorium
- Species: A. lepidotum

Binomial name
- Aequatorium lepidotum B.Nord.

Species of flowering plant

Aequatorium lepidotum is a species of flowering plant in the family Asteraceae. It is endemic to Ecuador, where it grows in high Andean forest and shrubland.
