= Aequatorium repandiforme =

Conservation status
- Near Threatened (IUCN 3.1)

Scientific classification
- Kingdom: Plantae
- Clade: Tracheophytes
- Clade: Angiosperms
- Clade: Eudicots
- Clade: Asterids
- Order: Asterales
- Family: Asteraceae
- Genus: Aequatorium
- Species: A. repandiforme

Binomial name
- Aequatorium repandiforme B.Nord.

Species of flowering plant

Aequatorium repandiforme is a species of flowering plant in the family Asteraceae that is found only in Ecuador. Its natural habitat is subtropical or tropical moist montane forests, and the plant is threatened by habitat loss.
