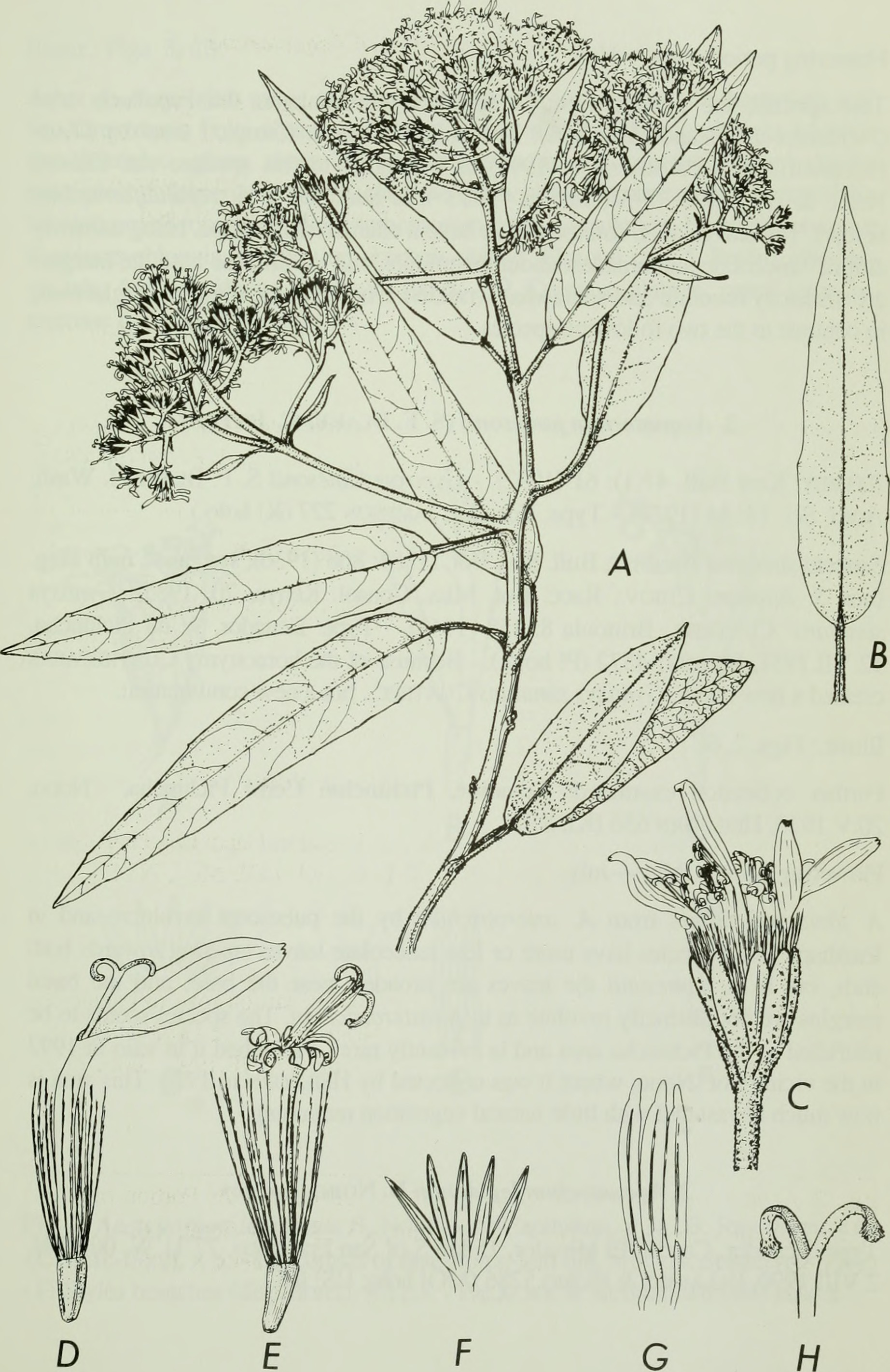
- Aequatorium jamesonii

Scientific classification
- Kingdom: Plantae
- Clade: Embryophytes
- Clade: Tracheophytes
- Clade: Spermatophytes
- Clade: Angiosperms
- Clade: Eudicots
- Clade: Asterids
- Order: Asterales
- Family: Asteraceae
- Subfamily: Asteroideae
- Tribe: Senecioneae
- Genus: Aequatorium; B. Nord.

= Aequatorium =

Genus of flowering plants

Aequatorium is a genus of flowering plants in the aster family. It was described as a genus in 1978. It is a member of the tribe Senecioneae and native to South America.

== Species ==
As of July 2025, Plants of the World Online accepts 12 species.

- Aequatorium albiflorum (Wedd.) Cuatrec. & S.Díaz - Colombia
- Aequatorium asterotrichum B.Nord. - Ecuador
- Aequatorium caucanum S.Díaz & Cuatrec.
- Aequatorium jamesonii S.F.Blake - Ecuador
- Aequatorium latibracteolatum S.Díaz & Cuatrec - Colombia
- Aequatorium lepidotum B.Nord. - Ecuador
- Aequatorium palealbum S.Díaz & A.Correa - Colombia
- Aequatorium polygonoides (Cuatrec.) B.Nord. - Colombia
- Aequatorium repandiforme B.Nord. - Ecuador
- Aequatorium sinuatifolium S.Díaz & Cuatrec - Colombia
- Aequatorium tatamanum S.Díaz & A.Correa - Colombia
- Aequatorium verrucosum (Wedd.) S.Díaz & Cuatrec. - Colombia

=== Formerly placed here ===
- Aequatorium carpishense (Cuatrec.) H.Rob. & Cuatrec. — synonym of Gynoxys carpishensis (Cuatrec.) H.Rob. & Cuatrec.
- Aequatorium cajamarcense H.Rob. & Cuatrec. — synonym of Gynoxys cajamarcensis (H.Rob. & Cuatrec.) Escobari & N.Kilian
- Aequatorium juninense H.Rob. & Cuatrec. — synonym of Gynoxys juninensis (H.Rob. & Cuatrec.) Escobari & N.Kilian
- Aequatorium limonense B.Nord. — synonym of Gynoxys limonensis (B.Nord.) Escobari & N.Kilian
- Aequatorium pascoense H.Beltrán & H.Rob. — synonym of Gynoxys pascoensis (H.Beltrán & H.Rob.) Escobari & N.Kilian
- Aequatorium repandum (Wedd.) C.Jeffrey — synonym of Gynoxys repanda Wedd.
- Aequatorium rimachianum (Cuatrec.) H.Rob. & Cuatrec. — synonym of Gynoxys rimachiana Cuatrec.
- Aequatorium stellatopilosum (Cuatrec.) C. Jeffrey — synonym of Gynoxys stellatopilosa (Cuatrec.) Escobari & N.Kilian
- Aequatorium tovarii H. Rob. & Cuatrec. — synonym of Gynoxys tovarii (H.Rob. & Cuatrec.) Escobari & N.Kilian
- Aequatorium tuestae (Cuatrec.) H. Rob. & Cuatrec. — synonym of Gynoxys tuestae (Cuatrec.) Cuatrec.
- Aequatorium venezuelanum V.M.Badillo — synonym of Gynoxys venezuelana (V.M.Badillo) Escobari & N.Kilian
