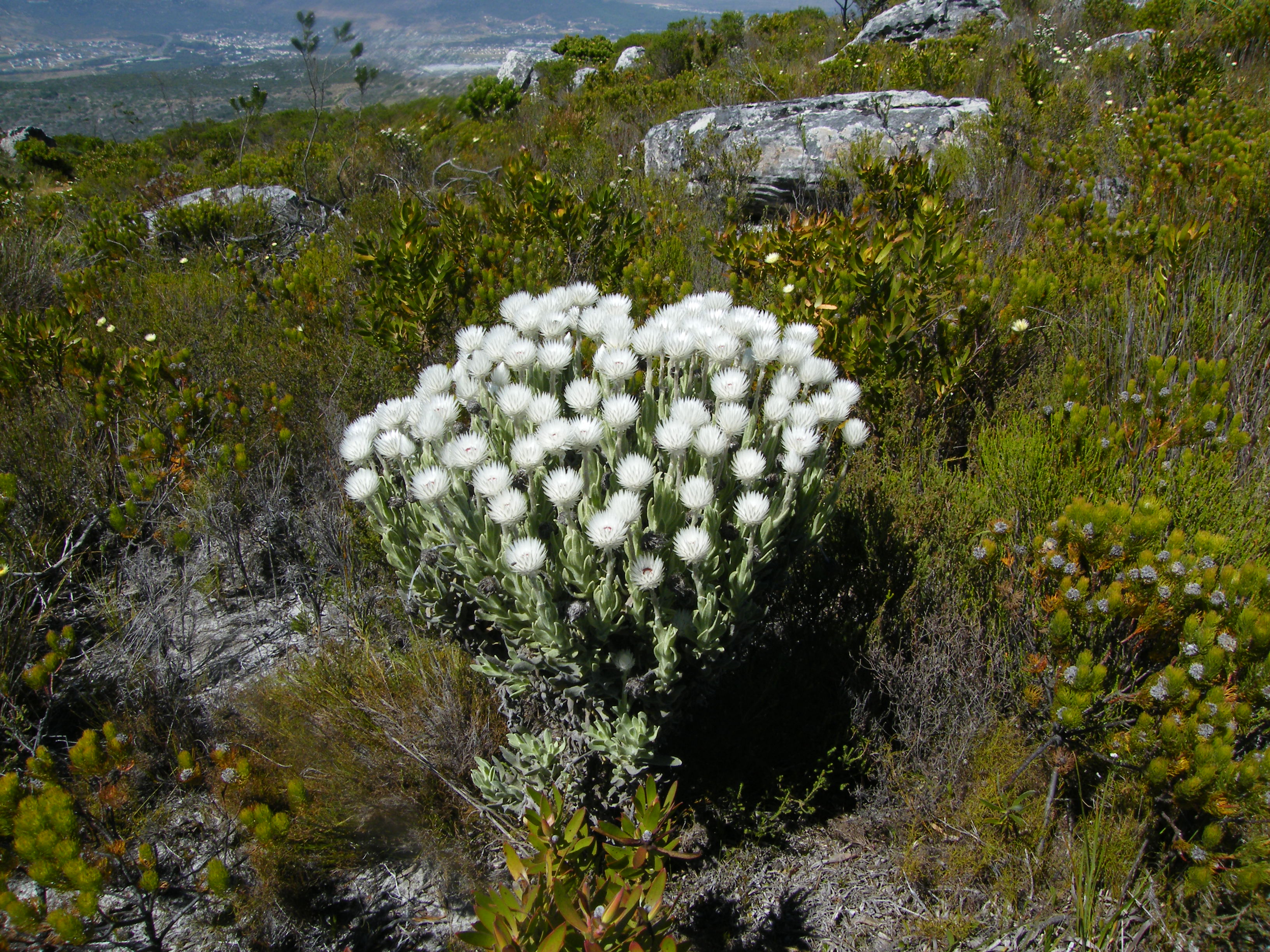
- Syncarpha vestita

Scientific classification
- Kingdom: Plantae
- Clade: Tracheophytes
- Clade: Angiosperms
- Clade: Eudicots
- Clade: Asterids
- Order: Asterales
- Family: Asteraceae
- Subfamily: Asteroideae
- Tribe: Gnaphalieae
- Genus: Syncarpha; DC.

Synonyms
- Argyranthus Neck., not validly publ.; Astelma R.Br. ex Ker Gawl.; Damironia Cass.; Helipterum DC.; Leucostemma D.Don

= Syncarpha =

Genus of plants

Syncarpha is a genus of herbaceous flowering plants in the family Asteraceae. The flowers are known by the common name: everlastings. The genus is endemic to the fynbos of the Eastern and Western Cape in South Africa.

Species

Species accepted by the Plants of the World Online as of December 2022:

- Syncarpha affinis (B.Nord.) B.Nord.
- Syncarpha argyropsis (DC.) B.Nord.
- Syncarpha aurea B.Nord.
- Syncarpha canescens (L.) B.Nord.
- Syncarpha dregeana (DC.) B.Nord.
- Syncarpha dykei (Bolus) B.Nord.
- Syncarpha eximia (L.) B.Nord.
- Syncarpha ferruginea (Lam.) B.Nord.
- Syncarpha flava (Compton) B.Nord.
- Syncarpha gnaphaloides (L.) DC.
- Syncarpha lepidopodium (Bolus) B.Nord.
- Syncarpha loganiana (Compton) B.Nord.
- Syncarpha marlothii (Schltr.) B.Nord.
- Syncarpha milleflora (L.f.) B.Nord.
- Syncarpha montana (B.Nord.) B.Nord.
- Syncarpha speciosissima (L.) B.Nord.
- Syncarpha staehelina (L.) B.Nord.
- Syncarpha variegata (P.J.Bergius) B.Nord.
- Syncarpha vestita (L.) B.Nord.
- Syncarpha virgata (P.J.Bergius) B.Nord.
- Syncarpha zeyheri (Sond.) B.Nord.
