= Bertil Nordenstam =

Swedish botanist

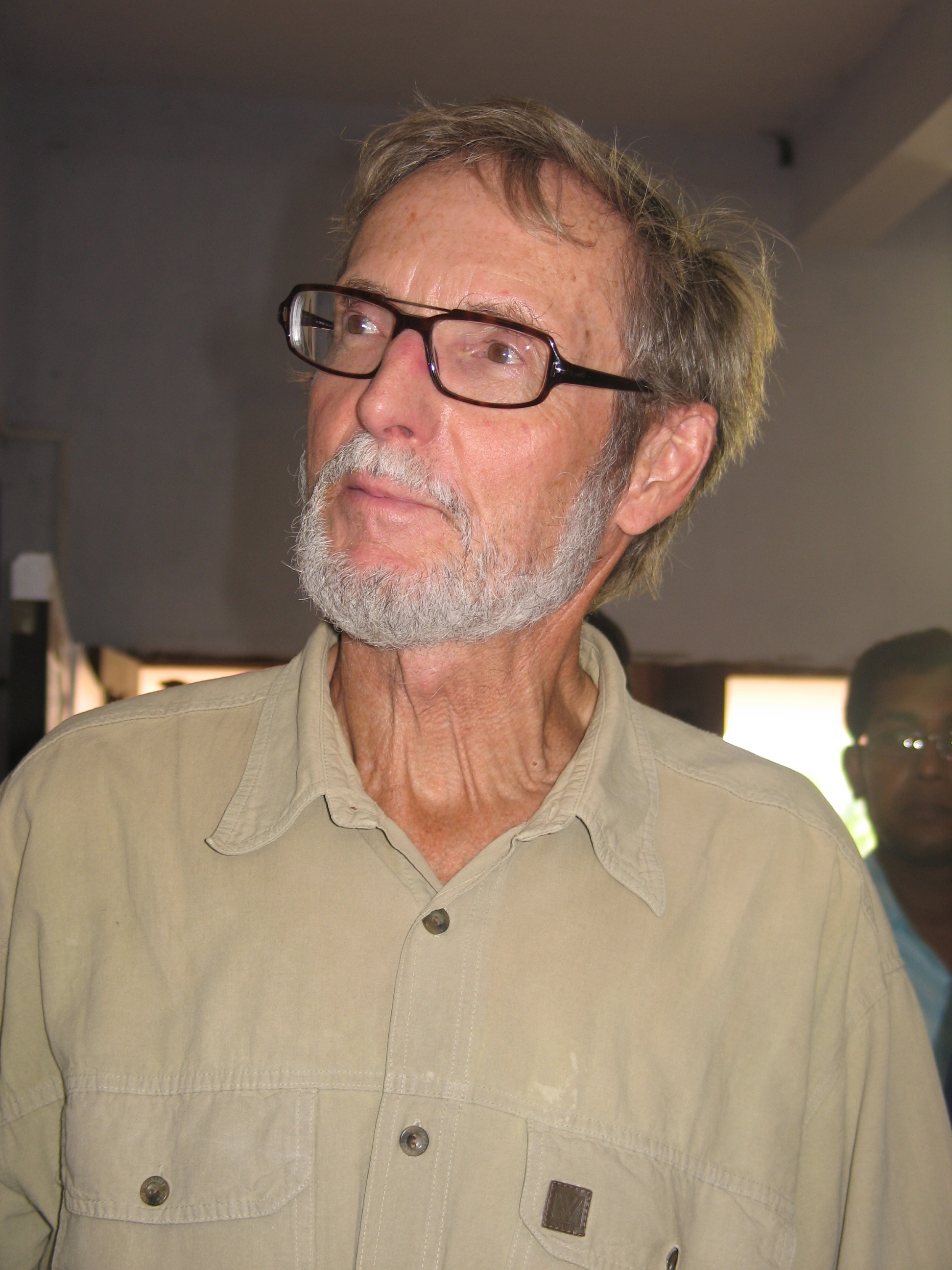
Bertil Nordenstam

Rune Bertil Nordenstam (born 1936) is a Swedish botanist and professor emeritus at the Swedish Museum of Natural History in the Department of Phanerogamic Botany. He has worked with Colchicaceae, Senecioneae and Calenduleae, was the editor of Compositae Newsletter newsletter since 1990, and is a Tribal Coordinator for The International Compositae Alliance with responsibility for the tribes Calenduleae and Senecioneae.

He has done field work in Greece, Sweden, Turkey, Mongolia, Egypt, Namibia. This botanist is denoted by the author abbreviation B.Nord. when citing a botanical name.

In 2006, botanist Roger Lundin published Nordenstamia, a genus of flowering plants from South America, belonging to the family Asteraceae and named in Nordenstam's honour.
