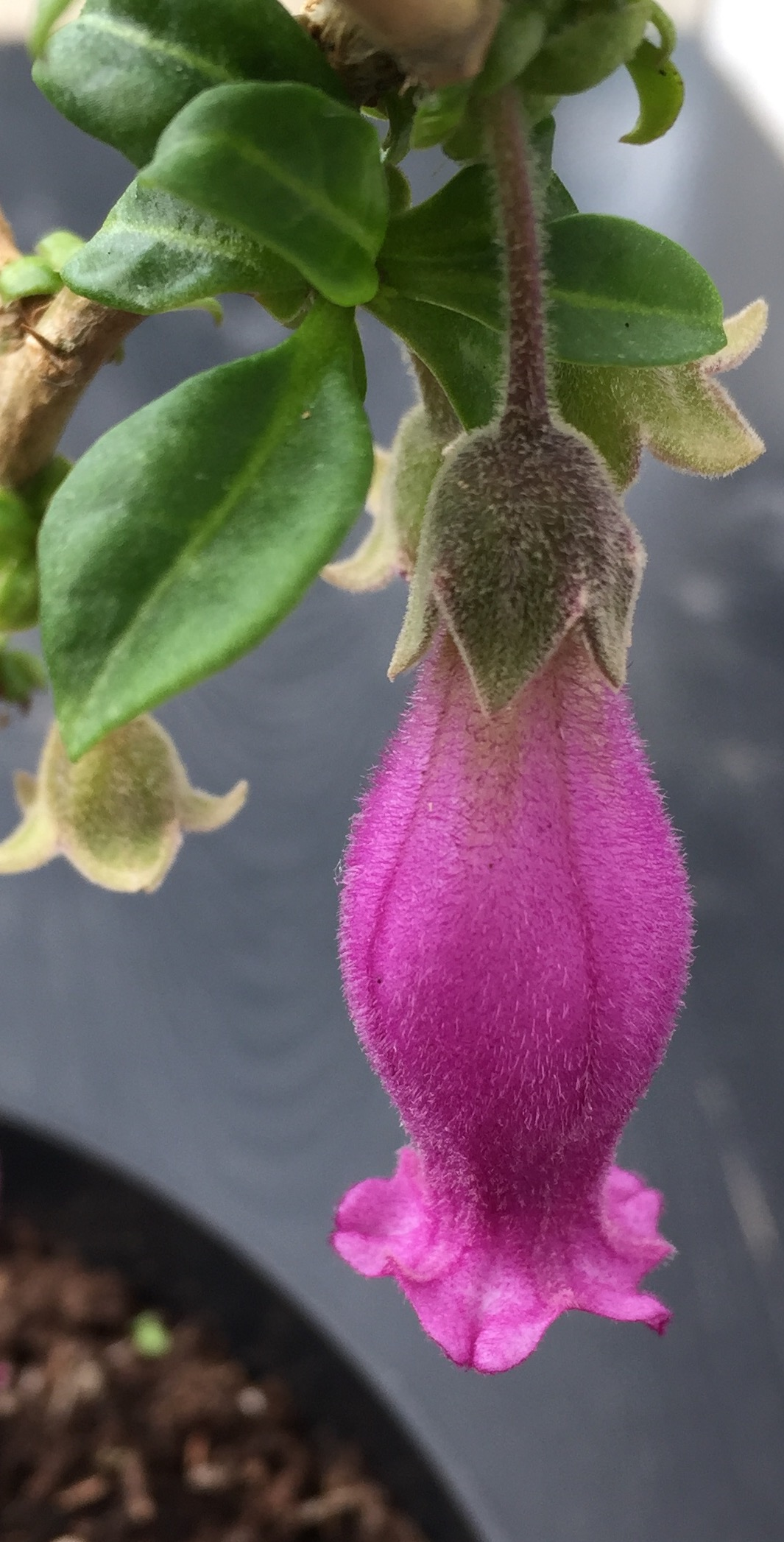

Scientific classification
- Kingdom: Plantae
- Clade: Tracheophytes
- Clade: Angiosperms
- Clade: Eudicots
- Clade: Asterids
- Order: Solanales
- Family: Solanaceae
- Subfamily: Solanoideae
- Genus: Latua; Phil.
- Species: L. pubiflora

Binomial name
- Latua pubiflora (Griseb.) Baill.

Synonyms
- Latua venenosa Phil. Lycioplesium puberulum F.Phil. Lycioplesium pubiflorum Griseb. (basionym)

= Latua =

Genus of flowering plants in the tomato family

Latua pubiflora (common name in Spanish: árbol de los brujos, lit. 'tree of the sorcerers') is the single species of the monotypic genus Latua, endemic to the coastal mountains of southern Chile. A shrub or small tree to 10 m in height, bearing attractive, magenta-to-red, hummingbird-pollinated flowers, it is extremely poisonous – hallucinogenic (deliriant) in smaller doses – due to tropane alkaloid content and is used by Chilean machi (shamans) of the Mapuche–Huilliche people in traditional medicine, as a poison and to enter trance states. Its elegant flowers and yellow tomato-like fruit are attractive enough to merit cultivation as an ornamental (despite the extreme toxicity).

== Description ==
Woody, spiny, evergreen, heteroblastic plant 2–10 m (6.6–33 ft) in height with one (tree) to several (shrub) trunks 3–40 cm (1.2–15.7 in) in diameter, trunks spreading upward and outward from base; bark thin, grey-green, streaked with corky, longitudinal fissures, becoming reticulate and somewhat rough, reddish to greyish brown / buff; branches smooth, grey-green and armed with spines; branchlets cylindrical, those of current year's growth covered with yellowish-brown pubescence, glabrescent; spines rigid, erect, arising as modified branches in leaf axils, up to 2 cm in length, usually with small leaf at base and one or two minute cataphylls toward the apex; leaf blades 3–12 cm in length by 1.5–4 cm in width, finely hairy, petioles circa 2 mm long. Flowers pendent, borne in late Winter / early Spring. pedicels tomentose, 5–20 mm long; calyx 8–10 mm long, densely pubescent; corolla urceolate (urn-shaped), magenta to red, 3–4 cm in length and circa 1.5 cm at the middle, with a densely pubescent exterior; style magenta, bearing bright green, capitate stigma; filaments of stamens magenta, attached at base of corolla for circa 8 mm and hairy at their bases, anthers purple, somewhat heart-shaped and circa 2 mm in length, dehiscing to reveal ash-grey pollen. Fruit a globose berry, a little flattened in shape and of a yellow to orange-yellow colour, circa 2 cm in diameter, seated in a densely hairy, accrescent calyx 11–16 mm in length, the lobes spreading and the calyx often splitting when the berry is fully ripe. Seeds thick, slightly longer than broad, circa 2 mm long, dark brown to black.

=== Flower colour ===
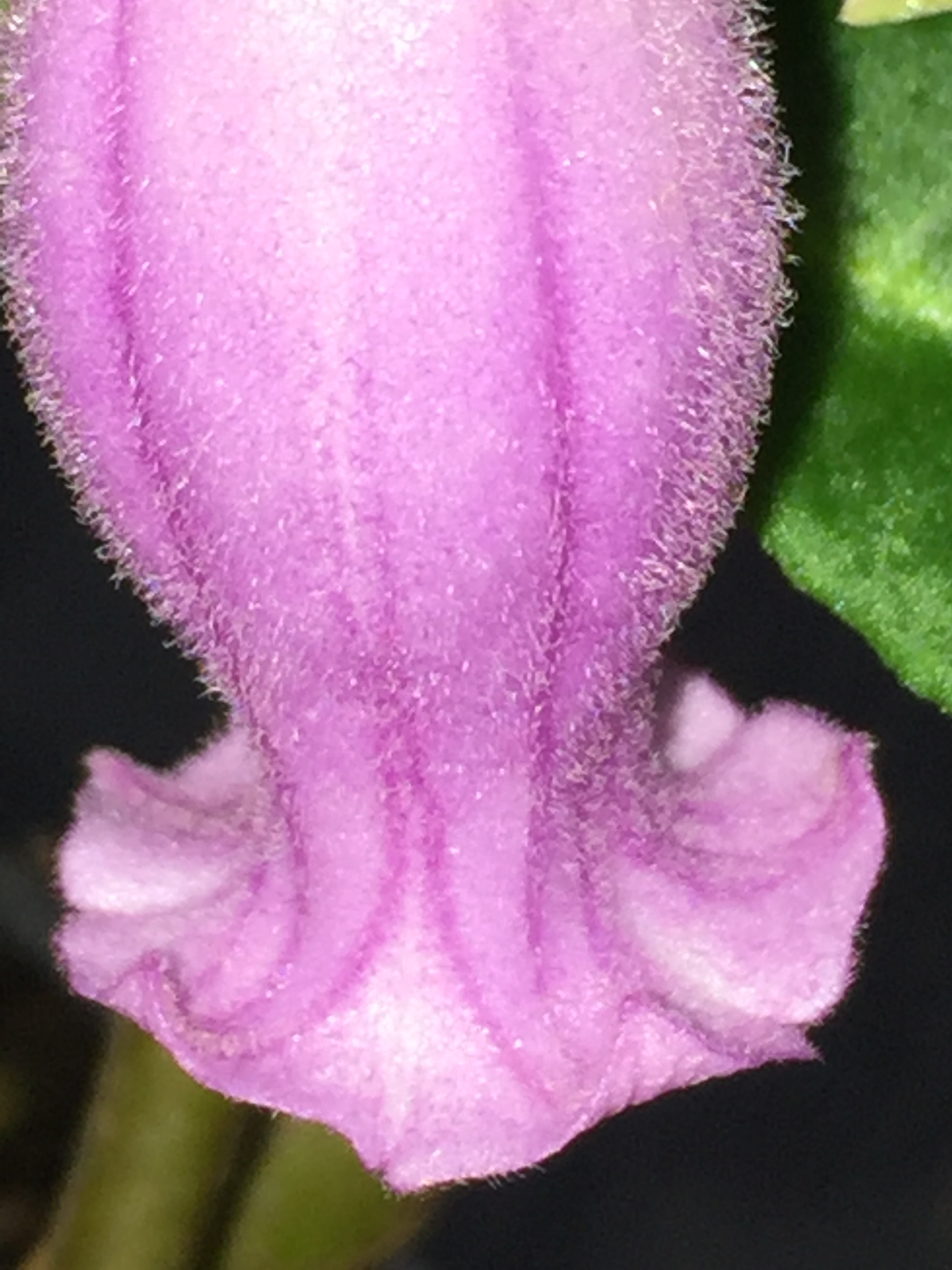
Unusually pale flower in which corolla venation highlighted to advantage by darker pigmentation of veins

As Plowman notes, there has been a measure of controversy concerning the colour range displayed by the flowers of Latua pubiflora. The label on the type specimen bears the Latin description flores coccinei i.e. 'flowers deep red', whereas subsequent authors have referred to them as variously 'violet', 'red' and atro-violaceus (dark violet) on the chromotaxy scale devised by Pier Andrea Saccardo. However, after observing flowers gathered from Latua plants growing in several different localities, Plowman expressed the opinion that, while there is some variation in flower colour, the flowers are usually magenta (as defined in Horticultural Color Chart 27/1).

== Taxonomy ==
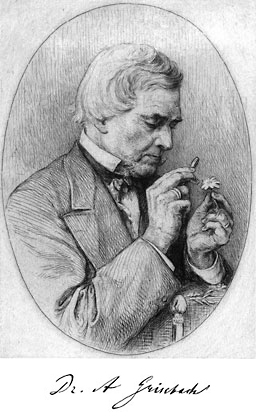
Dr. August Grisebach, author of the basionym Lycioplesium pubiflorum (see text)

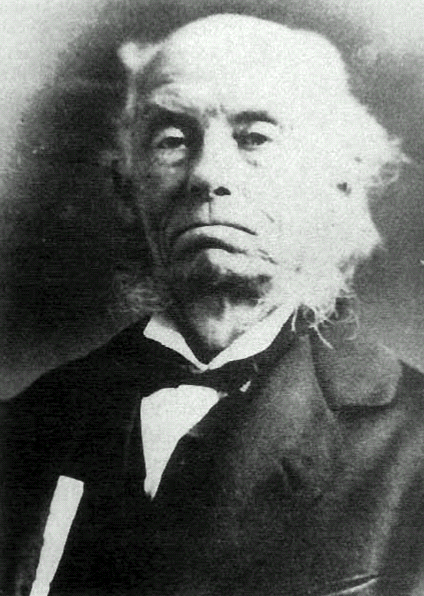
Dr. Rodolfo Amando Philippi Krumwiede, author of the Mapudungun-derived genus name Latua

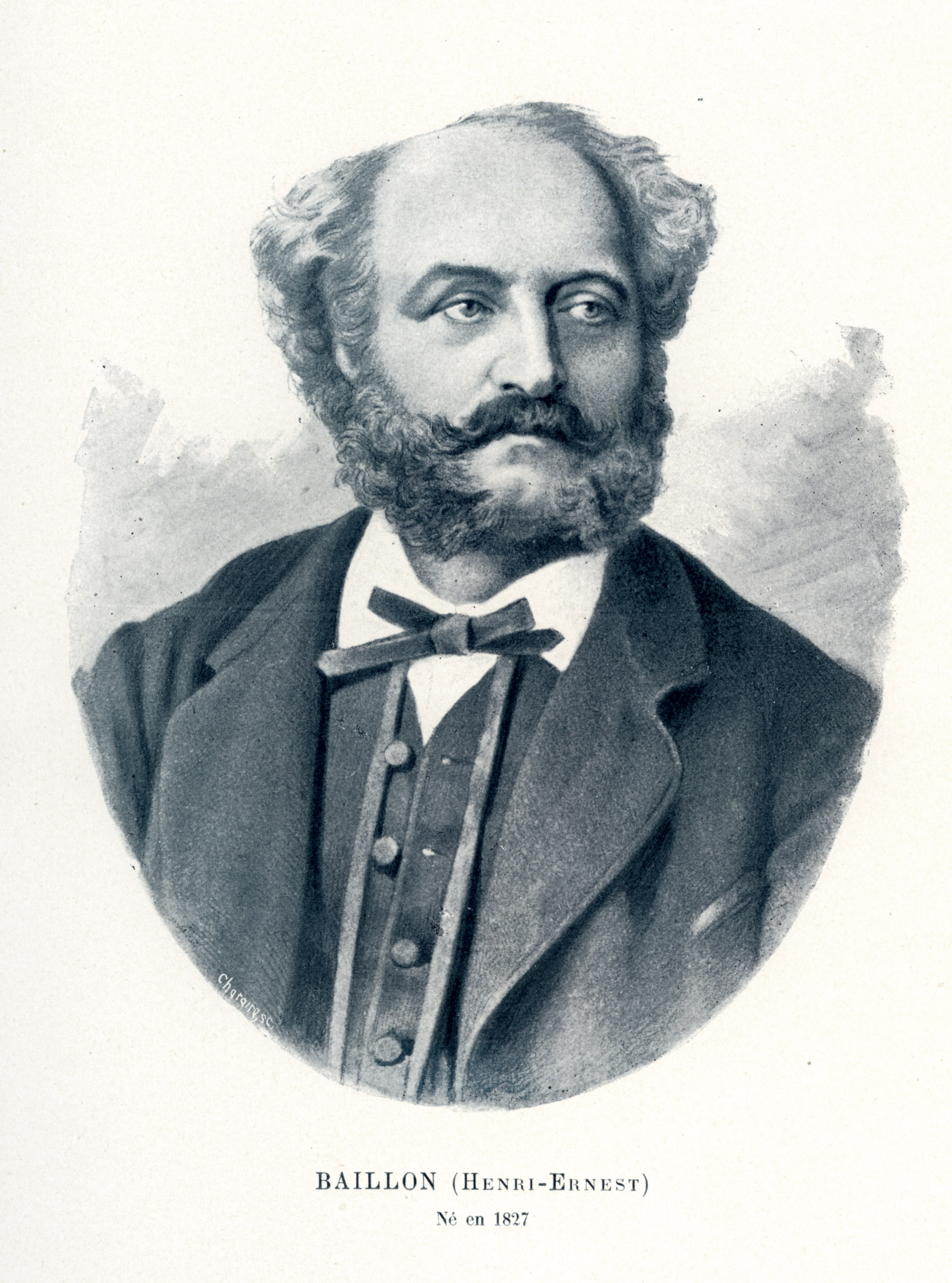
Dr. Henri Ernest Baillon, author of the binomial Latua pubiflora

The plant first entered the scientific record in the mid 19th century with the publication of the Linnaean binomial Lycioplesium pubiflorum by German botanist and phytogeographer August Heinrich Rudolf Grisebach in 1854. Grisebach described the plant (under the name Lycioplesium pubiflorum) from a specimen collected by Lechler near the city of Ancud on the north coast of Chiloé Island.

The genus name Latua was published by German-Chilean naturalist Rodolfo Amando Philippi Krumwiede in the journal Botanisches Zeitung No. 33, August 1858: Latua Ph., eine neues Genus der Solanaceen (pp. 241–242), as the generic element in the binomial Latua venenosa.

The current binomial, Latua pubiflora, juxtaposing Grisebach's specific name and Philippi's genus name was published by French botanist and physician Henri Ernest Baillon in Histoire des Plantes vol. 9, published in Paris in 1888 by Librairie Hachette - page 334.

=== Scientific name ===
The genus name Latua was created by Philippi by Latinising the indigenous Mapudungun (Mapuche / Araucanian) name for the plant, which exists in a number of local variants, the oldest of which is the (now obsolete) Latue-hue. This is derived from the Mapuche verb Lan 'to die', tu, a causative particle, and hue 'the instrument with which something is done', giving the meaning 'that which causes (something) to die' i.e. 'lethal' or 'deadly'. Three more modern forms of the same derivation are the regional variants latúe, latué and latuy. [The last of these can also designate the (unrelated) hallucinogenic plant Desfontainia spinosa, which, although psychoactive, has not been recorded in the literature as being dangerously toxic]. The Latin specific epithet pubiflora means simply 'having hairy flowers'. The binomial Latua pubiflora in its entirety may thus be translated as the deadly poisonous plant with hairy flowers.

== Vernacular names in Spanish ==
The vernacular name for the plant in Spanish most frequently encountered in the literature is árbol de los brujos, meaning 'tree of the sorcerers', in reference to the use of the plant by the Chilean machi. This reflects the fact that, while the machi of today are usually female, historically this important rôle as practitioner of the sacred was often filled by transvestite or homosexual men, or intersex individuals. The inference is that in a Mapuche culture less affected by European conceptions of gender and the sacred, an ambiguous or non-binary status was actually one of the signs or markers of sacred status. By contrast, in an ironic twist, gender-fluid individuals in the Mapuche culture of today can fall victim to discrimination.

Other vernacular names recorded include palo de bruja – 'witch tree' and palo mato – 'tree (stick) that kills', the latter being identical in sense to the Mapudungun word latué (see above).

== Distribution ==
Position of Futahuillimapu (the Los Lagos Region – here highlighted in red – to which Latua is endemic) within Chile

Map showing the homelands of the indigenous peoples of Chile including the Huilliche of Osorno and Valdivia (left to right represents south to north)

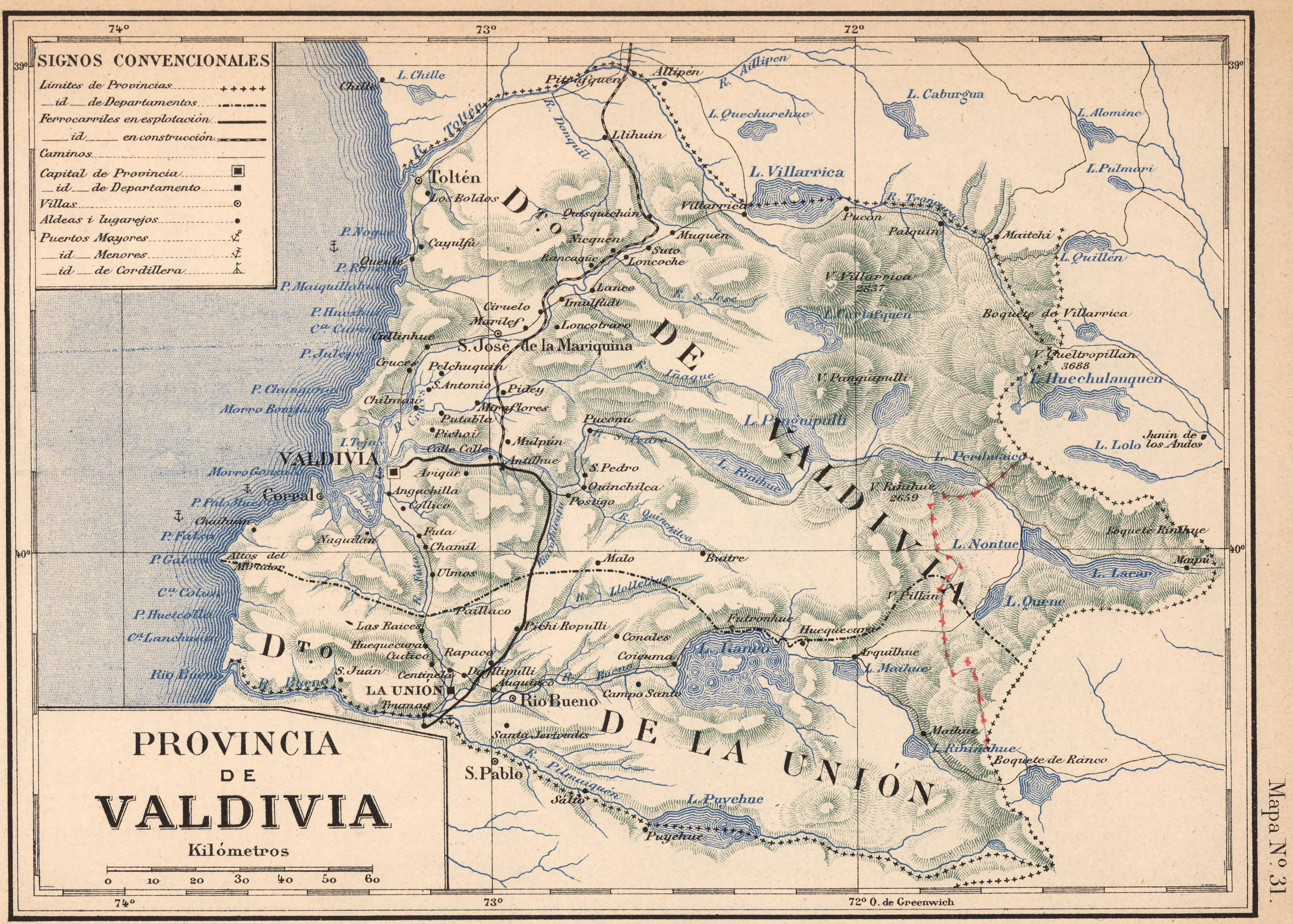
Map of Valdivia province, year 1903, work of F.A. Fuentes for Atlas de Chile Arreglado para la Jeografia Descriptiva de la Republica de Chile by Enrique Espinoza

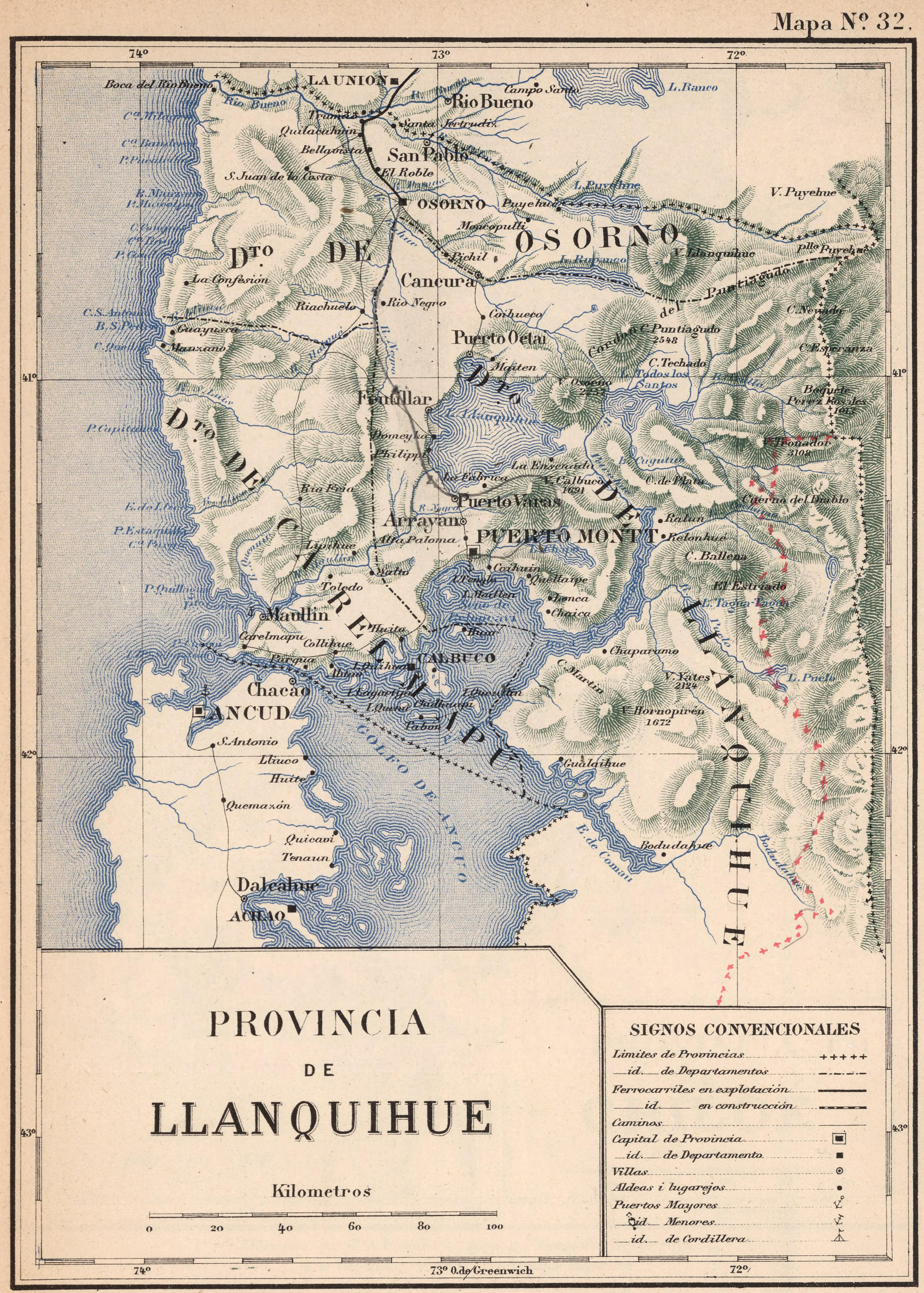
Map of Llanquihue and Osorno provinces, year 1903, work of F.A. Fuentes for Atlas de Chile Arreglado para la Jeografia Descriptiva de la Republica de Chile by Enrique Espinoza

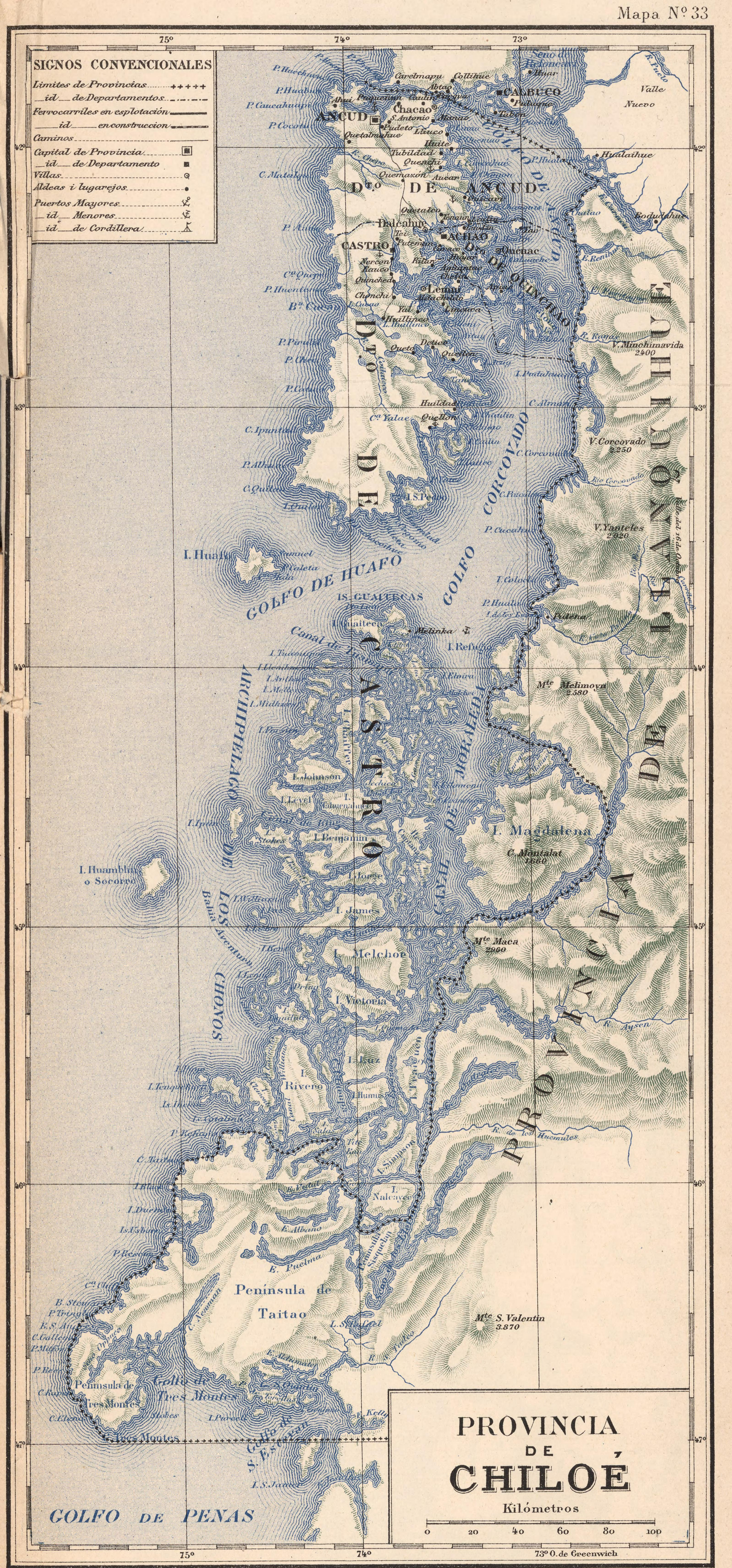
Map of Chiloé Archipelago and the south of Llanquihue province, being the southern portion of the distribution range of Latua pubiflora, including the city of Ancud, near which the plant was first collected. (Map of 1903 by F.A. Fuentes, as above).

...the plant grows only in the narrow coastal cordillera between Valdivia and Chiloé, a difficult mountainous terrain with an extremely wet climate and few roads; during the rainy season, the existing roads are nearly impassable.

– thus Plowman, writing in 1971, adding, on page 66:

Latua pubiflora is found sporadically in the coastal mountains of southern Chile between 40 degrees and 43 degrees latitude from the province of Valdivia to Chiloé. This region has...over 2540 mm (100 in.) of rainfall annually. Latua occurs primarily in the middle elevations of the cordillera between 300 and 900 m (900 and 2700 ft.).

The range of distribution of the species thus corresponds roughly to the Los Lagos Region (Lakes Region), the plant occurring in all four of its component provinces: Chiloé, Valdivia, Osorno and Llanquihue. The Los Lagos Region is the only area within Chile classified as having predominantly Köppen climate type Cfb (Oceanic climate) according to the Köppen climate classification. The indigenous Huilliche people, whose shamans possess much esoteric knowledge concerning Latua (and, indeed, their entire indigenous flora), call this land to which they and their plant are native Futahuillimapu – 'great land of the south'.

== Habitat ==
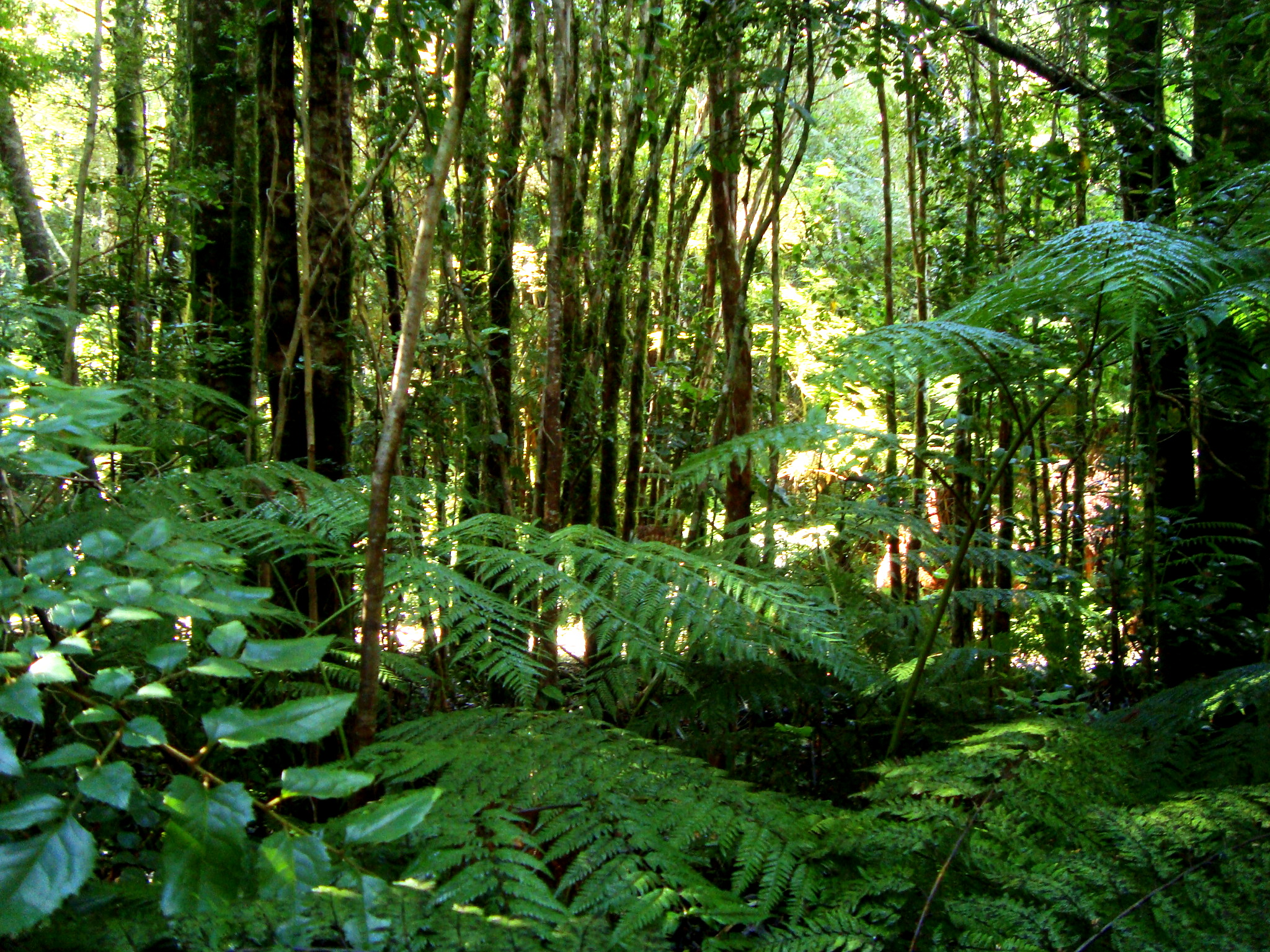
Characteristic vegetation of Valdivian Temperate Rainforest, Parque Oncol, Provincia de Valdivia

An element originally of the Valdivian temperate rainforest, Latua is to be found increasingly in areas occupied by fields and pastures as a result of extensive deforestation undertaken to produce timber and devote land to grazing. Despite this habitat loss, the species had (at the time of Plowman's writing) adapted well to the more open conditions prevailing on cultivated land – so much so that, although known from relatively few localities, it had actually become something of a weed of roadsides and open places in those localities where it was present, thanks to its propensity for suckering, spreading easily by adventitious branches from its underground parts – despite efforts to eradicate it by removing top-growth. Latua grows usually as a tall shrub along clearings and in secondary forests and can, in shaded woodland, attain its maximum recorded height of 10m. It is frequently to be found growing in association with species belonging to the genera Eucryphia (e.g. E. cordifolia and E. glutinosa), Laurelia (i.e. the single Chilean species L. sempervirens) and Chusquea (a genus of New World bamboos).

== Flowering season ==
In the northern part of its range, in the provinces of Osorno and Valdivia, Latua pubiflora is Spring-flowering and Autumn-fruiting, the flowers starting to appear in October at the beginning of the rainy season and the fruits being borne in February and March. By contrast, in the southern part of its range – where there is less seasonal variation in precipitation – the plant flowers in Autumn or Winter: in Llanquihue, Latua bears flowers in March, while in Chiloé they are borne in July (Southern Hemisphere seasons). Plowman further notes that, under favourable conditions, the plant may flower more than once a year, but that he and his colleagues had not observed this personally.

In cultivation in the U.K., Latua is Spring-flowering, blooming in March and April (as in the wild in the province of Llanquihue).

== Toxicity ==
The marked toxicity of Latua was noted frequently in the early literature on the plant.

=== Symptoms of poisoning ===
Unsurprisingly for a tropane-rich Solanaceous plant, the effects produced by consumption of Latua pubiflora closely resemble those of intoxication by its infamous relative deadly nightshade: dry mouth, a hot and feverish feeling in the body, eyes with greatly dilated pupils and blurred vision, frothing at the mouth (from thickening of saliva), acute mental disturbances and 'insanity', convulsions, delirium, and hallucinations.

The cerebral effects have been characterised as

intense psychomotor agitation accompanied by delirium which corresponds to acute, exogenous, toxic psychosis.

=== Folk medicinal antidotes ===
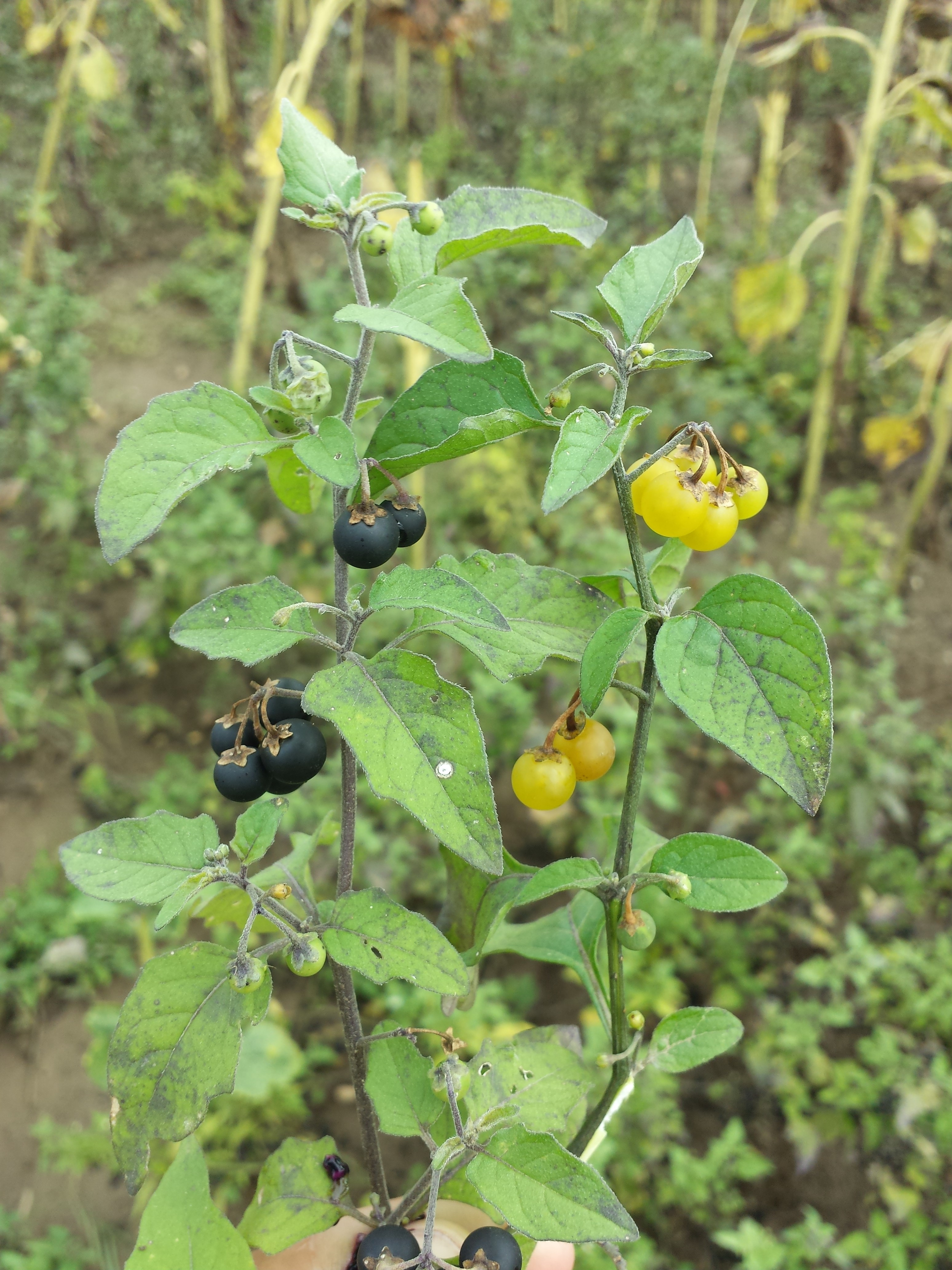
Black-berried and yellow-berried forms of hierba mora (= Solanum nigrum), said by the Machi to be an antidote to Latua poisoning

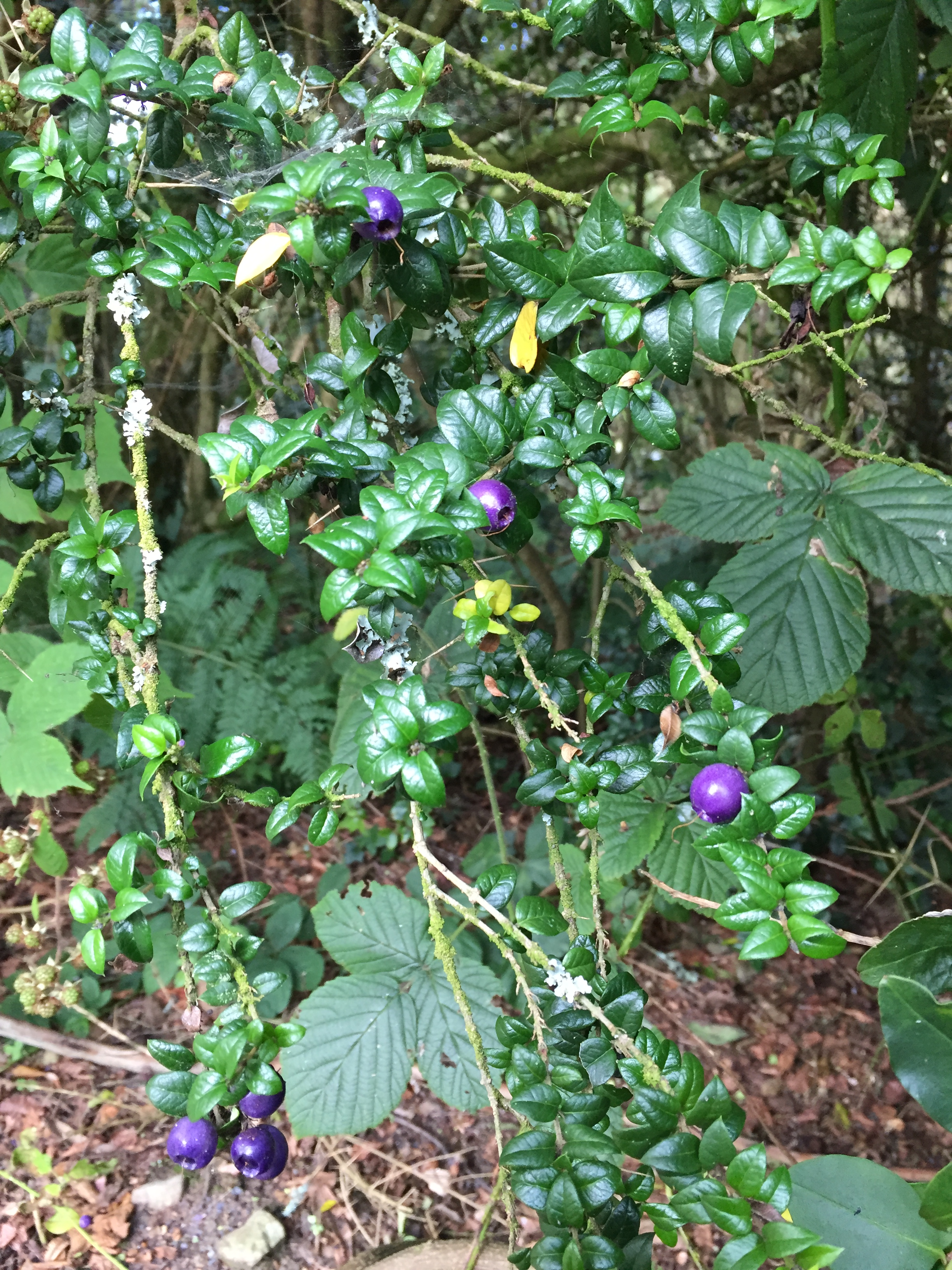
Attractive fruits of Rhaphithamnus spinosus (family: Verbenaceae): according to the Machi, one of the herbal antidotes to poisoning by Latua pubiflora

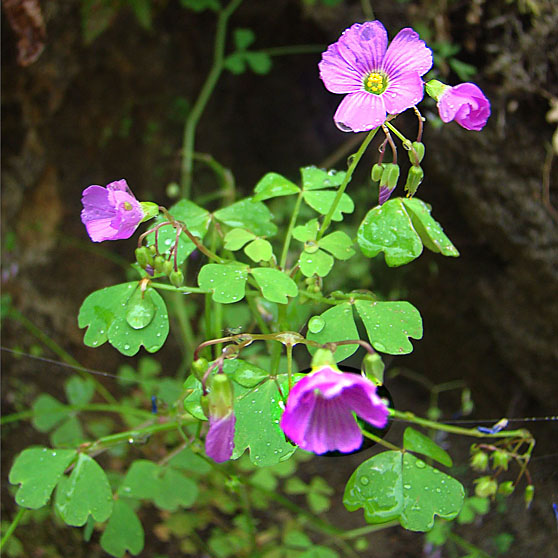
Oxalis rosea Common name in Chilean Spanish Culle rosada. A third plant said by the Machi to be a Latua antidote.

...los hechiceros [= Machi/sorcerers] could quickly recover [from Latua intoxication] with a drug from a Solanum species of the section Morella (to which Solanum nigrum belongs).

The above quotation from a letter sent by Dr. Benkt Sparre to Plowman enlarges upon the testimony of Murillo and Mariani, according to whom the most frequently mentioned antidote to Latua poisoning is Solanum nigrum L., (known in Chile by the vernacular Spanish name hierba mora): "...a decoction of mora is drunk for eight days while fasting. Compresses soaked in the infusion are wrapped about the head or neck or rubbed on the back". In the absence of a voucher specimen, Dr. Sparre considered the identification of the species involved to be tentative i.e. a plant 'like' hierba mora/'probably' a Solanum species.

Similarly used are a species of Oxalis known locally as culle and the fruit of the shrub Rhaphithamnus spinosus (family Verbenaceae) – see page Rhaphithamnus – known locally as espino negro (= 'black thorn').

A prominent after-effect of poisoning by Latua, as first noted by Philippi in 1861, is persistent severe headaches.

=== The self-experimentation of Dr. Sparre ===
Few outsiders to the Los Lagos Region have experienced the effects of Latua at first hand, making Dr. Benkt Sparre's account of his self-experimentation with an infusion of Latua of particular interest. Sparre, later Curator at the Museum of Natural History of Stockholm, was, at the time of his self-experiment, Professor at the Universidad de Concepción de Chile and was living in an agricultural college in Centinela. On the evening of January 1, 1954, just before attending what he describes as a fête-champêtre, Sparre drank approximately 5cl of an infusion prepared (apparently by himself and in the manner described by his informants) from the green leaves and bark of Latua. The initial effects were slow to appear: after about 3 hours he noticed an extreme dryness of the mouth accompanied by a strong desire to spit, with spitting made difficult by the drying of his saliva to a froth at first whitish and later more solid (viscous). There was also a strong desire to urinate (with urination itself almost impossible). A little later, he experienced a "heavy" intoxication unlike (and not as pleasureable as) alcoholic intoxication, manifesting as "an immediate and almost complete loss of memory". Sparre attended the party (where he seems to have made an unsuccessful pass at a local girl) in his bufuddled condition and was later put to bed by a friend, without having any memory of the fact. Later that night he awoke with a feeling of claustrophobia and injured himself slightly, while blundering about in a very confused state in search of the toilet, having finally to be physically restrained and locked in his room by the same friend. The following morning Sparre awoke with a strong hangover but still determined to take part in a previously-planned excursion, and believing himself to be "fairly clear in the head" – which was soon proved to be very far from the case:

I suddenly spoke to those present in a completely unknown language without looking at anyone present. Unfortunately, I remember nothing from this conversation, nor with whom I thought I spoke...What I remember is that I suddenly jumped out of my chair, thinking that somebody wanted to beat me. It was my own hand which [ had ] hung on the back of my chair which [ had ] frightened me. [Compare disorder Somatoparaphrenia].

During the day-long excursion Sparre's consciousness alternated between periods of clarity and periods of drowsy, quasi-hallucination:

During these latter periods, I saw the forest around the road as some kind of Russian boyar-ballet in heavy costumes.

Sparre had returned to normal by the evening of January the 4th when he regained the ability to read, which had deserted him during the experience [explicable partly by blurred vision due to mydriasis]. He noted, however, that when he wrote up his journal that evening he had difficulty in keeping to the lines. [Note: comparison of Dr. Sparre's experience with the dramatic (not to say lurid) generalised accounts of Latua poisoning of other authors referenced in Plowman's paper, suggest that the amount of alkaloids he consumed in his 5cl of Latua infusion may have been relatively small: he experiences, in general, drowsy confusion rather than raving mania, although the long duration of his "trip" and its after-effects (several days) and its associated patchy amnesia are thoroughly in keeping with experiences produced by tropane alkaloid-containing Solanaceae].

=== Latúe and Tayu: a potentially lethal confusion ===
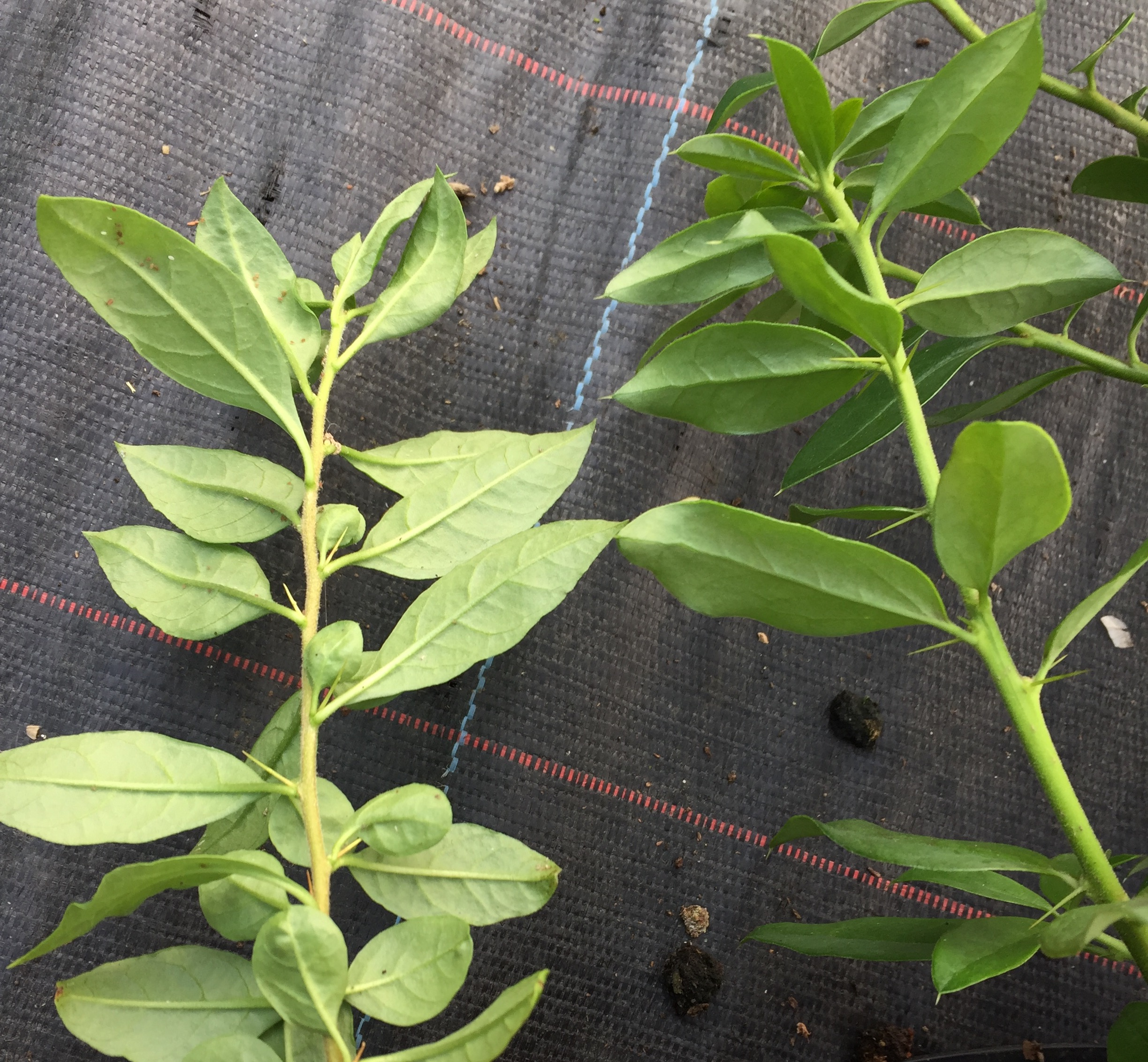
Foliage of young, non-flowering branchlet of Latua (on the left) compared and contrasted with one of Tayu (on the right). Note: 1.) Latua stem spines borne singly, while Dasyphyllum stem spines borne in pairs. 2.) Dasyphyllum leaves bear a terminal spine absent in Latua leaves. 3.) Dasyphyllum leaves soon become more leathery than those of Latua, as they mature.

A major cause of accidental poisoning by Latua is its unfortunate similarity (when not in flower) to the Tayu tree Dasyphyllum diacanthoides (family Asteraceae), the bark of which is a source of popular remedies (both topical and oral) for blunt trauma. The dangers of mistaking Latua for Dasyphyllum are first mentioned by Philippi in his original 1861 account of Latua:

One of his [ Philippi's informant Señor Juan Renous's ] woodcutters had suffered a strong blow with the blunt end of his axe and went into the forest to get some bark of tayu for it. He took instead Latúe [Latua] and drank a concoction of this poison. He became insane almost immediately and wandered into the mountains. He was found three days later in an unconscious state. Several days were required for his recovery, although he suffered severe headaches for several months.

=== Fish poison ===
Latua was used by the Huilliche as a fish poison as late as the early years of the twentieth century: the juice of the plant (plant part unspecified, but probably that of sappy, green branches) was placed into slow-flowing rivers, causing the fish in them to become torpid and easily caught. Plowman's indirect quotation of Pomar's reference to this practice mentions also Drimys winteri, another tree species considered sacred by the Huilliche, but it is not clear from the context whether the juices of Latua and Drimys were used separately or in combination as ichthyotoxic agents.

== Magic tree of the Huilliche shamans: Latua and the Machi ==
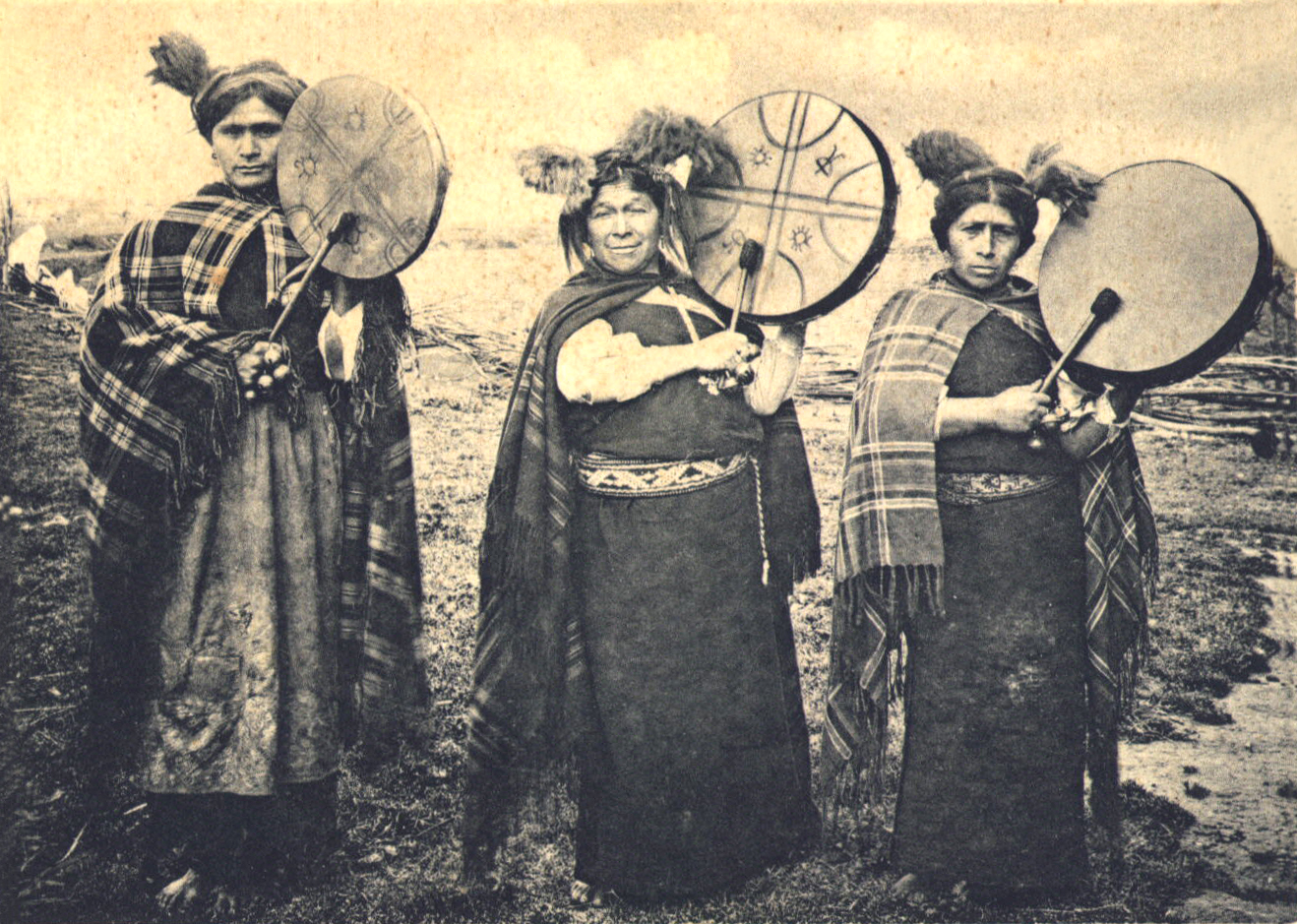
Machi, photographed beating their kultrun (sacred drums) in the year 1900

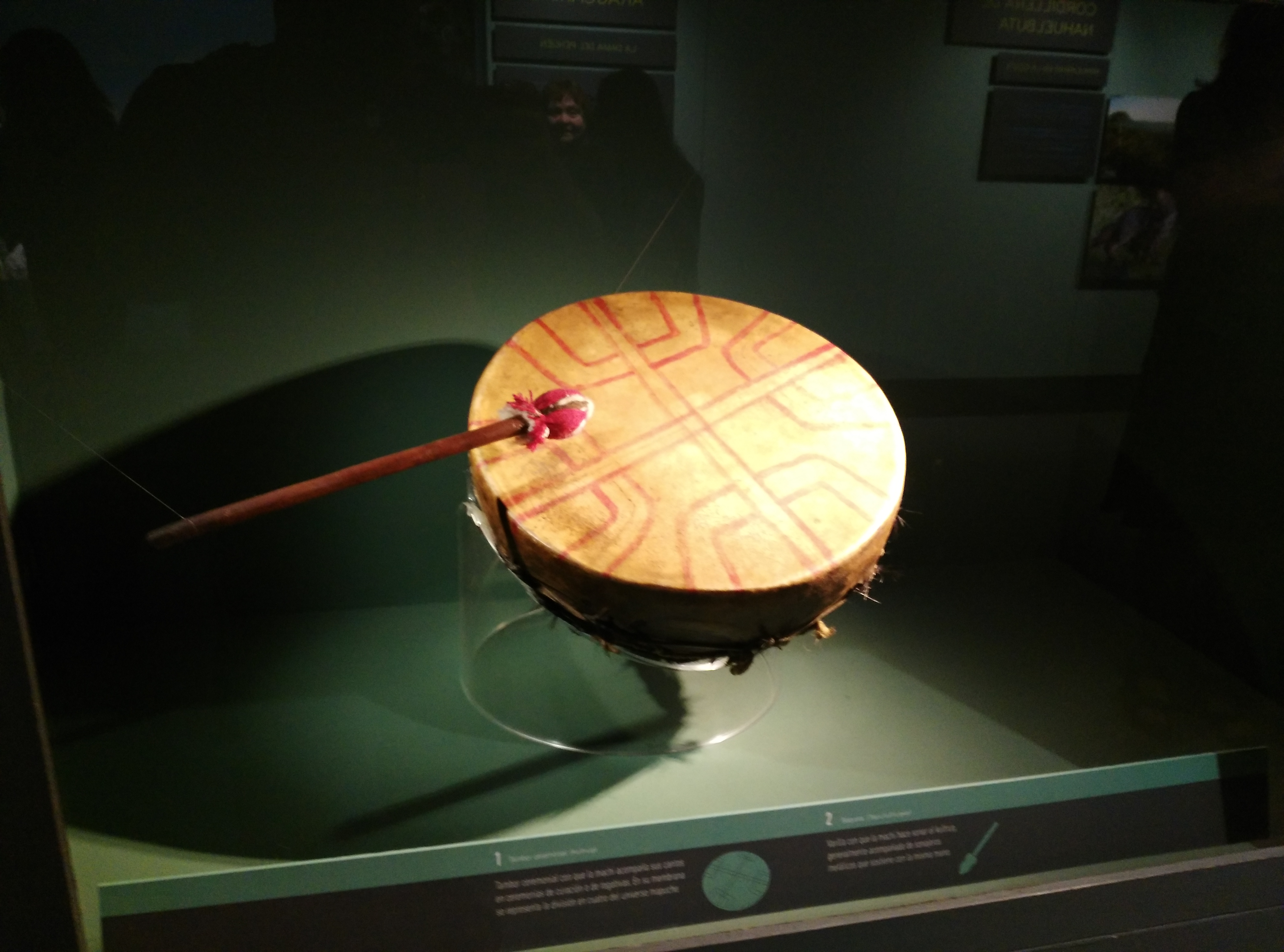
A kultrun: the shamanic drum of a Machi the beat of which aids Mapuche-Huilliche shamans in entering an A.S.C. Collection of the Museo Nacional de Historia Natural, Santiago, Chile

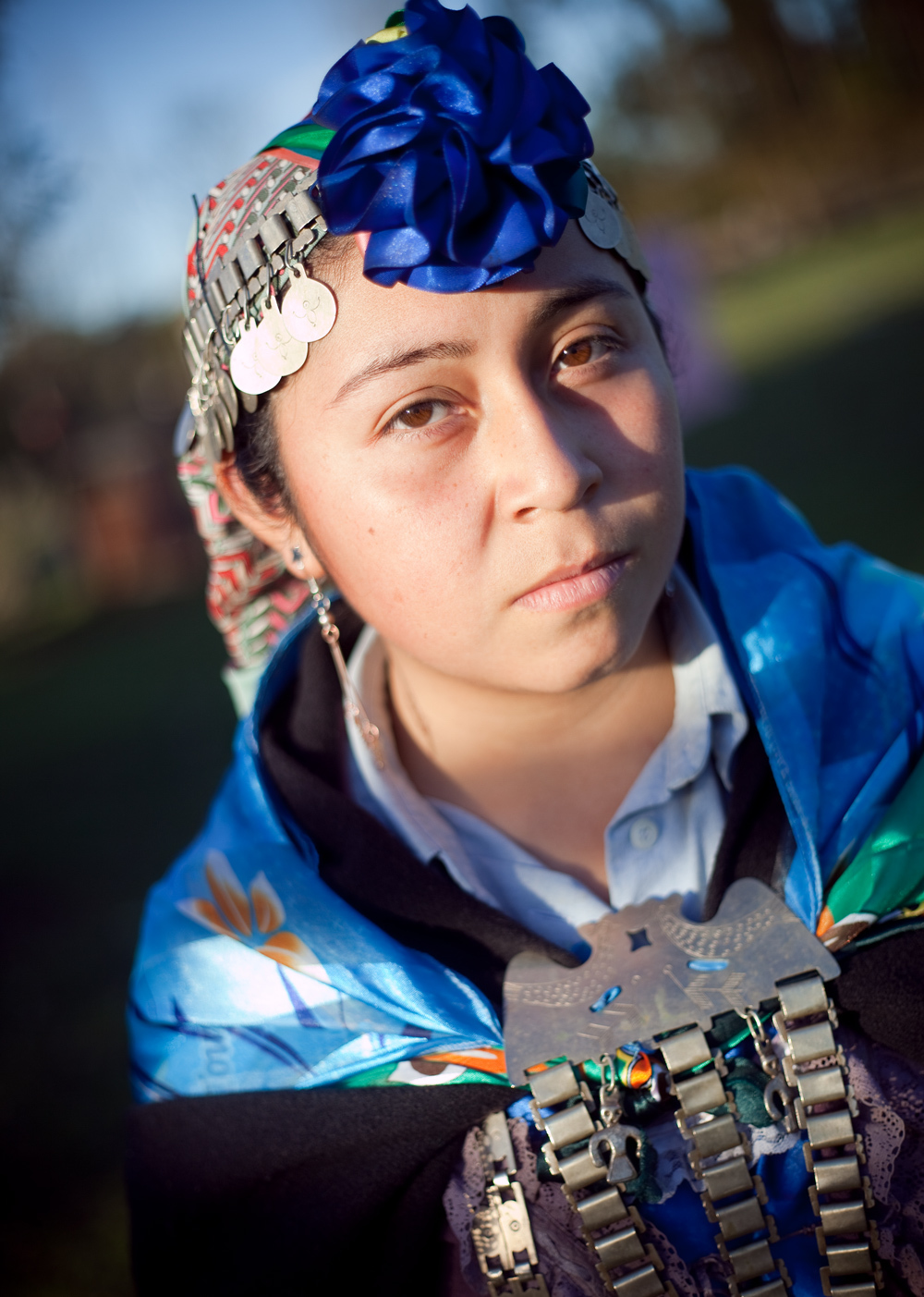
Soledad, a young modern Machi, photographed at the age of 16 in the year 2009

Philippi wrote in 1861

It has been six years now since I first learned that the Indians of the Province of Valdivia possess a secret way of producing insanity with a poisonous plant, for a long or short time depending on the dose. It is considered with great secretiveness. Padre Romualdo, a missionary in Daglipulli, succeeded in learning that the plant is a tall shrub called latué which grows in the forests of the coastal mountains.

and 110 years later Plowman could still observe

...the occurrence of Latua and its use is a closely guarded secret surrounded by much superstition, since the plant is employed primarily by local shamans and sorcerers in their magical healing rites. Those familiar with Latua and its properties are very protective of this knowledge and are unwilling to discuss it with outsiders. For this reason, little has appeared in the literature concerning the ethnotoxicity of Latua.

The southernmost tribe [ of the Mapuche / Araucanians ], known as Huilliche and extending to Chiloé, are the people who know and use Latua

Before the publication of Plowman's paper of 1971, Latua had usually been portrayed in the literature as a poisonous plant rather than an entheogen, documented as featuring in poisonings both accidental and deliberate: a sinister plant associated with insanity and death. Plowman changed this image by bringing to scientific attention the testimony of one Rolando Toro, a psychologist from Santiago, who is the first person recorded in the literature as having actually witnessed the consumption of Latua as an entheogen by Machi. He did so at a machitun (curing ceremony / shamanic séance) in Chiloé, prefacing his account thus:

Latua is used in an infusion by the shamans or curanderos, who ingest it during nocturnal ceremonies of a magical nature.

Prior to this, in 1953, Dr. Benkt Sparre, Curator at the Swedish Museum of Natural History, Stockholm, although he never actually witnessed himself a ceremony in which Latua was consumed by Machi, had recorded the following hearsay:

According to explanations by elderly villagers of La Posada, who had not tried latue themselves, an infusion was prepared in the evening with green leaves and bark. It was said that only los hechiceros (witches) used latue. Intoxicated and with an appropriate refill from a sub-hechicero (witch's apprentice), they could dance and preach for a week. None of my informants had seen this, but they had heard it from old people.

=== Latua curing ceremony, as described by Rolando Toro ===
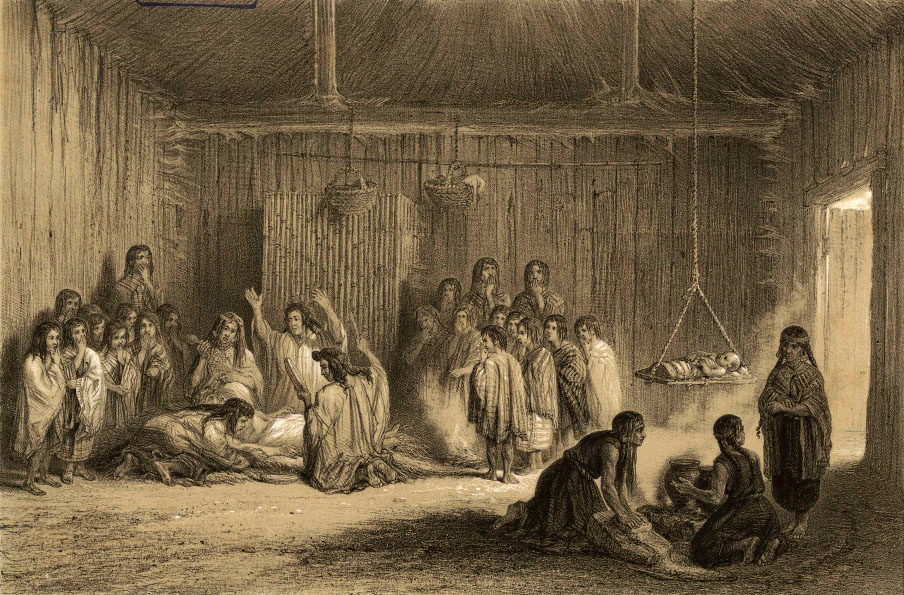
A daytime machitun very different from the nocturnal Latua ceremony described by Rolando Toro. Note machi beating kultrun. Illustration by F. Lehmert for Atlas de la historia fisica y politica de Chile by Claudio Gay.

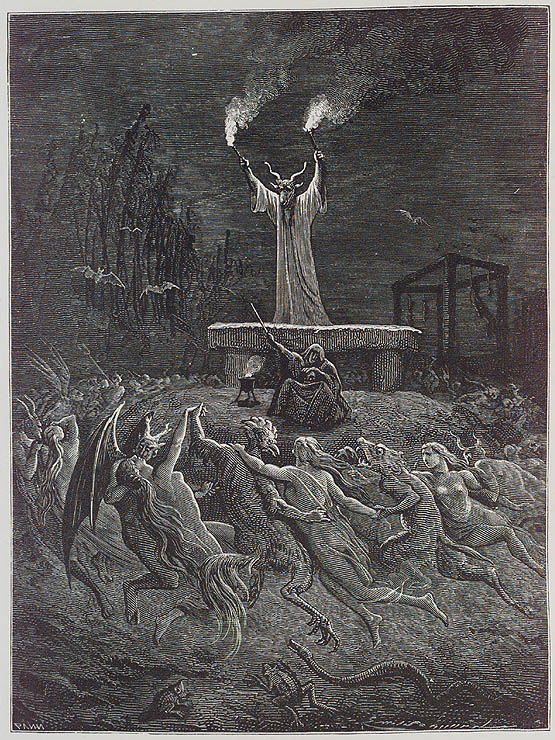
Fantasy scene of nocturnal circle dance at a (European) Witches' Sabbath paralleling dance at Huilliche Latua ceremony [note also goat-headed Devil presiding]. La danse du Sabbat, artist Émile Bayard: Illustration from History of Magic by Paul Christian, Paris, 1870.

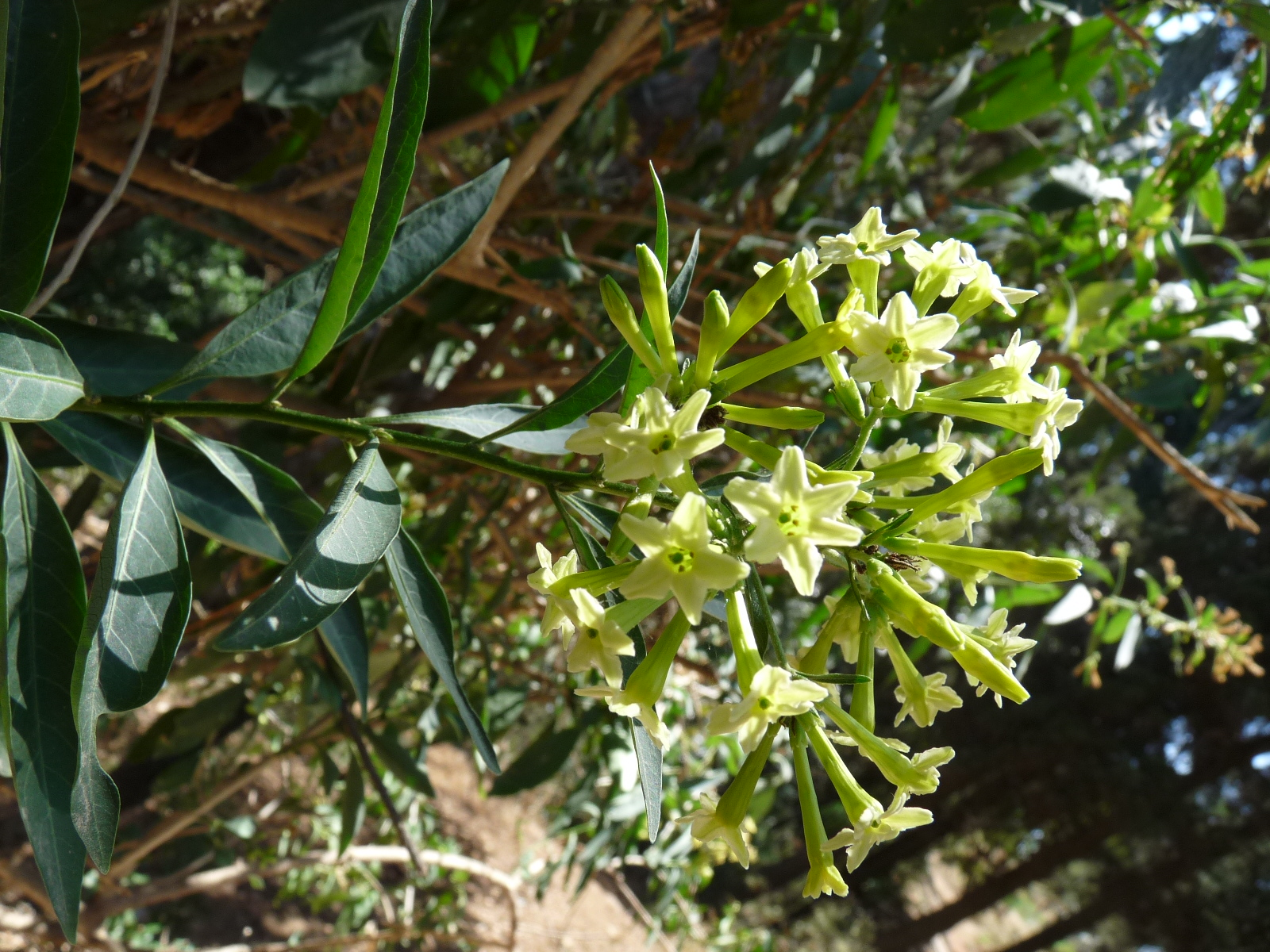
Palqui (Cestrum parqui) – the malodorous shrub whose branches were used to slap the patient in the Latua curing ceremony witnessed by Rolando Toro

[Note: the brief account of a machitun ceremony given to Plowman by Rolando Toro (see above), although first-hand, based on personal observations made by the author in Chiloé, reads more like an account relayed to him by another, although this may simply be a stylistic choice].

Toro states that such ceremonies are always held at night and are believed to be effective in curing every type of infirmity, whether physical or mental, and likens them to "a witches' sabbath with curative ends". The night setting is readily understandable, given that Solanaceous narcotics like Latua dilate the pupils of the eye widely, as in low light intensities, a physiological effect which would make their use during the day unpleasantly dazzling for the consumer. The comparison to a witches' sabbath, however, has a literary flavour and conveys an impression of orgiastic behaviour somewhat at variance with the rather slow and sombre ceremony described, although certain parallels to conceptions of a night gathering of European witches are discernible.

As in many types of New World, shamanic, curing rituals, not only the patient, but also the healer consumes "medicine": Toro describes the machi conducting the ceremony drinking doses of a Latua infusion at 20–30 minute intervals in order to enter the altered state of consciousness in which healing is believed to be possible, before slowly beginning to sing and dance in a circle. The songs or chants consist of repetitions of the name of the plant intoxicant itself, rendered with variations of rhythm and tempo. Toro gives the following extract or sample:

Latué - latué - la - tué

La - la - la - tué

Tué

La - tué

La - a - a - a (slowly)

La - tué - la - tué - la - tué (fast)

Toro describes the dance accompanying this rhythmic chanting as monotonous and characterised by a strange, inelegant rigidity reminiscent of catatonia [ see also Stereotypy ], the rhythms being marked by stamping of the feet and jerky movements of the head, while the arms are held out motionless "hanging like wings".

This rhythmic, rather zombie-like dancing is kept up for some 4–6 hours, interspersed with prayers which exhibit a syncretism between traditional Huilliche beliefs and Christianity – of which prayers Toro gives the following example:

Con un tizón ardiendo

[ trans: With a flaming torch ]

Cristo quema el mal

[ trans: Christ burns the evil ]

De vientro de (...)

[ trans: From the belly of ( here the name of the patient ) ]

The physical aspect of the treatment consists of three actions believed to cast out the demons of disease from the patient's body: first he or she is slapped with the malodorous branches of another poisonous, Solanaceous shrub Cestrum parqui, known locally by the name palqui; secondly he/she is made to drink an emetic potion [ingredients unspecified] and thirdly his/her face is covered with the skin stripped from the genitals (scrotum?) of a goat. While the second treatment is obviously designed to induce vomiting, the other two also seem calculated to have the same effect. The inference is that the demons thought to be responsible for the patient's disease are believed to be living in his / her abdomen or, more specifically, stomach. Apropos of Toro's comparison of the Latua ceremony with a witches' sabbath, the token presence of goat genitalia recalls the traditional goat form and prominent genitals of the Devil, as featured in the testimony of early modern witch trials and in certain artists' depictions of the master of the sabbath.

=== Latua use by machi in the 21st century ===
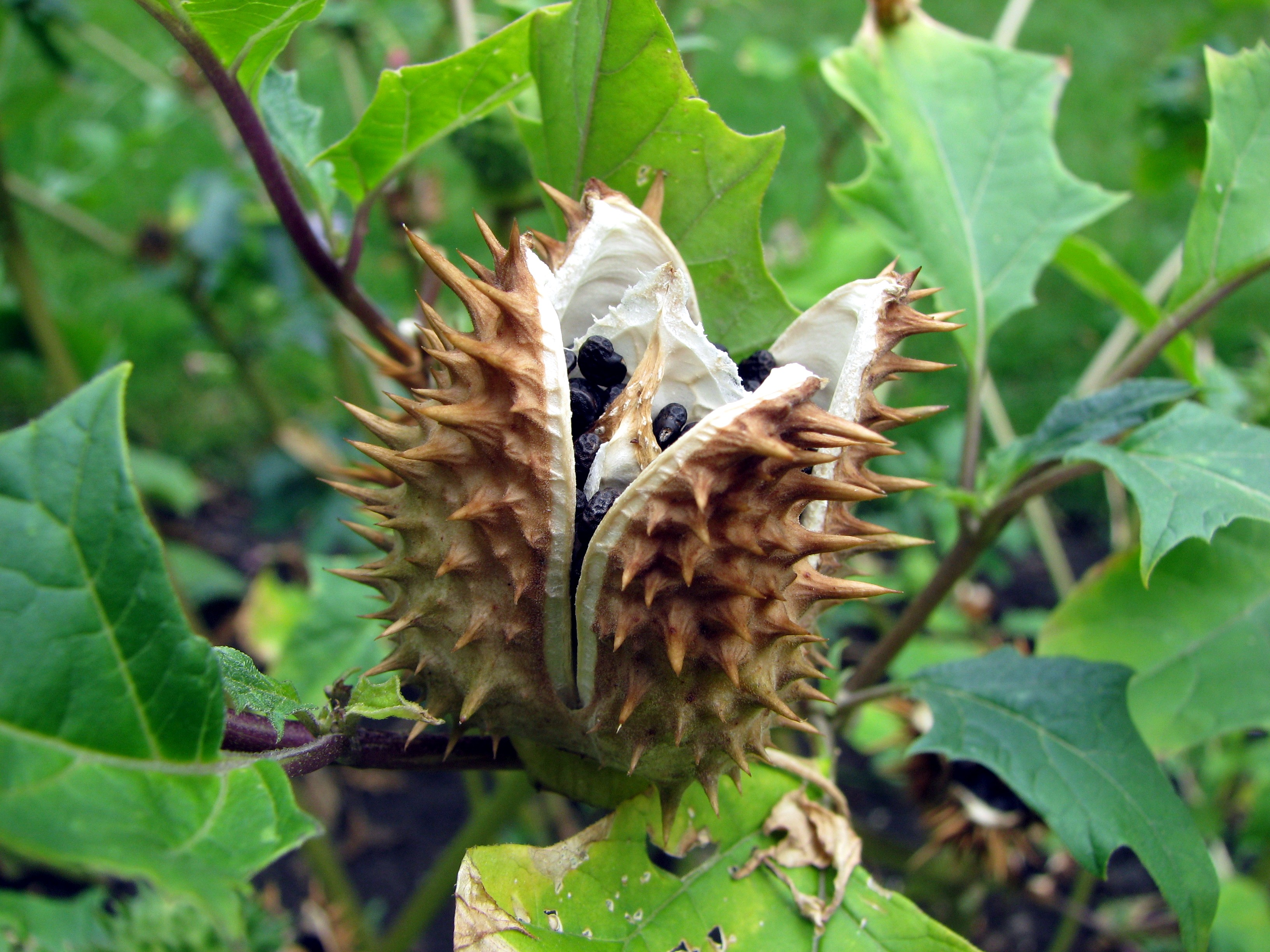
Open capsule of Datura stramonium – known in Chile as chamico or miyaya and possessing a chemistry similar to that of Latua – revealing hallucinogenic seeds

Bacigalupo (2007) notes in her recent study of the machi that Latua use has by no means died out among the Huilliche, although attitudes to the use of hallucinogens by machi appear to have become less positive than in the past.

Some machi ingest palo de bruja (Latua pubiflora) or the seeds of the miyaya, or chamico, plant (Datura stramonium) in order to produce hallucinations, divine the future, exorcise evil spirits, and treat pain, mental illness, asthma and rheumatism. Machi who do not use hallucinogens are often critical of those who do, sometimes labelling them kalku (=[malign] witch), because it is assumed that they will use these plants to poison others.

In this context, Bacigalupo goes on to quote one of her informants, Hortensia, a machi who does not use hallucinogenic plants because she maintains that only

...bad machi who do not trance on their own [i.e. cannot enter shamanic trance states without the aid of hallucinogens] use these herbs.

Such a "purist" attitude and practice may be contrasted with Plowman's remarks concerning the general behaviour of machi in the 1970s and earlier :

The machi's training period is devoted to developing her psychic abilities through various methods: intense mental concentration and meditation, chanting, fasting, violent exercise in the form of whirling dances [compare Sufi whirling], auto-hypnosis and the constant use of narcotics. [Italics added.]

and again:

Hallucinogenic and narcotic plants play an important rôle in the life of the Mapuche shaman. These drugs are normally employed during the machitun ceremony and are administered to the young machi as part of her education.

== Chemistry ==
Latua pubiflora produces four Tropane alkaloids: scopolamine, hyoscyamine, apoatropine and 3α-cinnamoyloxitropane, giving it a chemistry and pharmacology similar to those of species belonging to the New World tribes Datureae and the Old World tribes Hyoscyameae and Mandragoreae which, like Latua, are placed in the nightshade subfamily Solanoideae, and possess similar anticholinergic properties, sharing also a similar history of use as entheogens in the practice of shamanism and witchcraft.

== Gallery ==
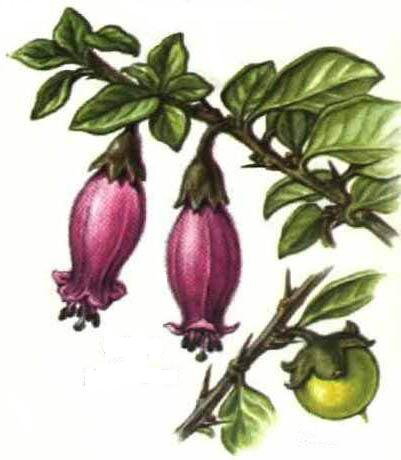
Reproduction of botanical illustration, showing flower and fruit

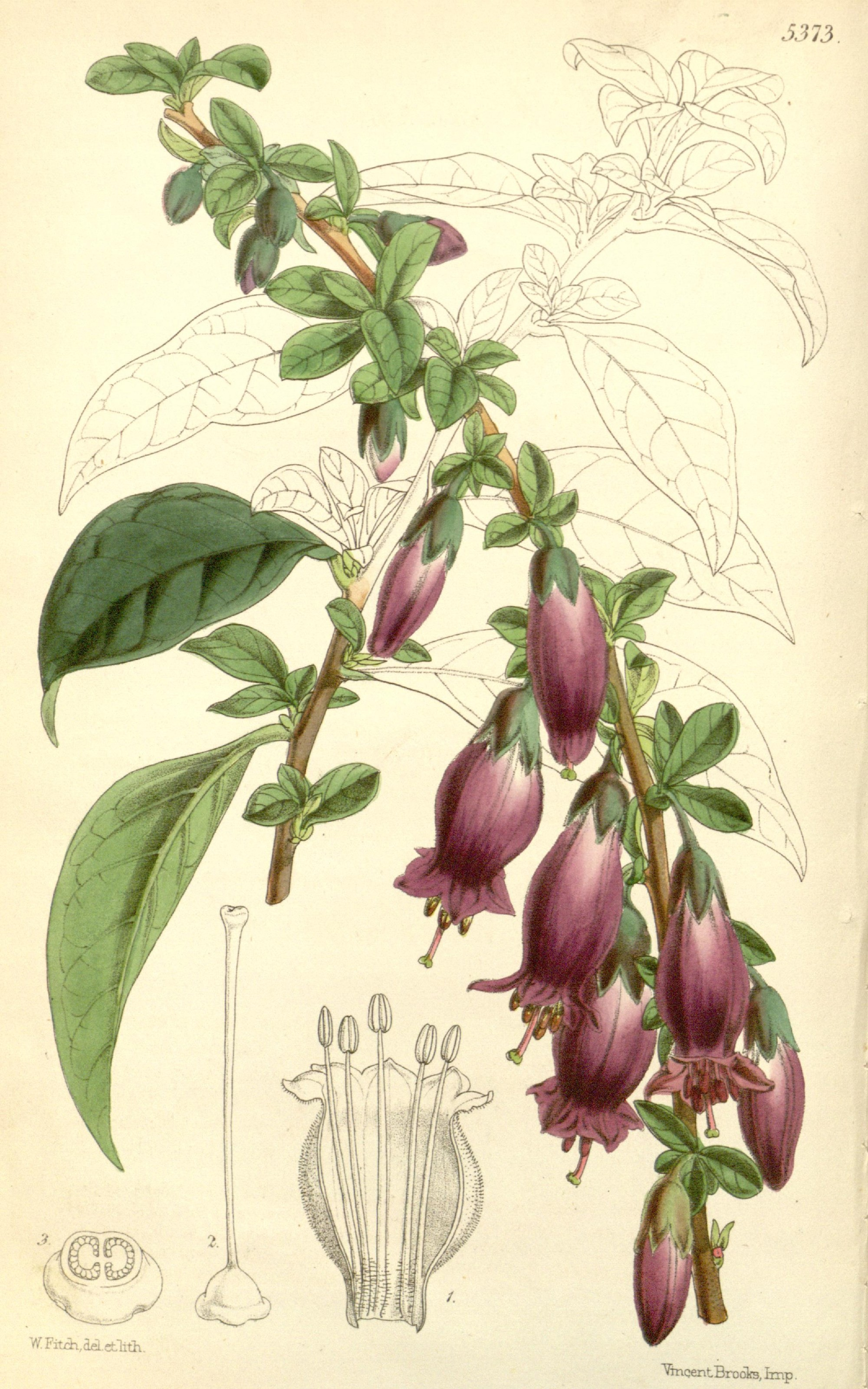
Illustration from Curtis's Botanical Magazine, 1863

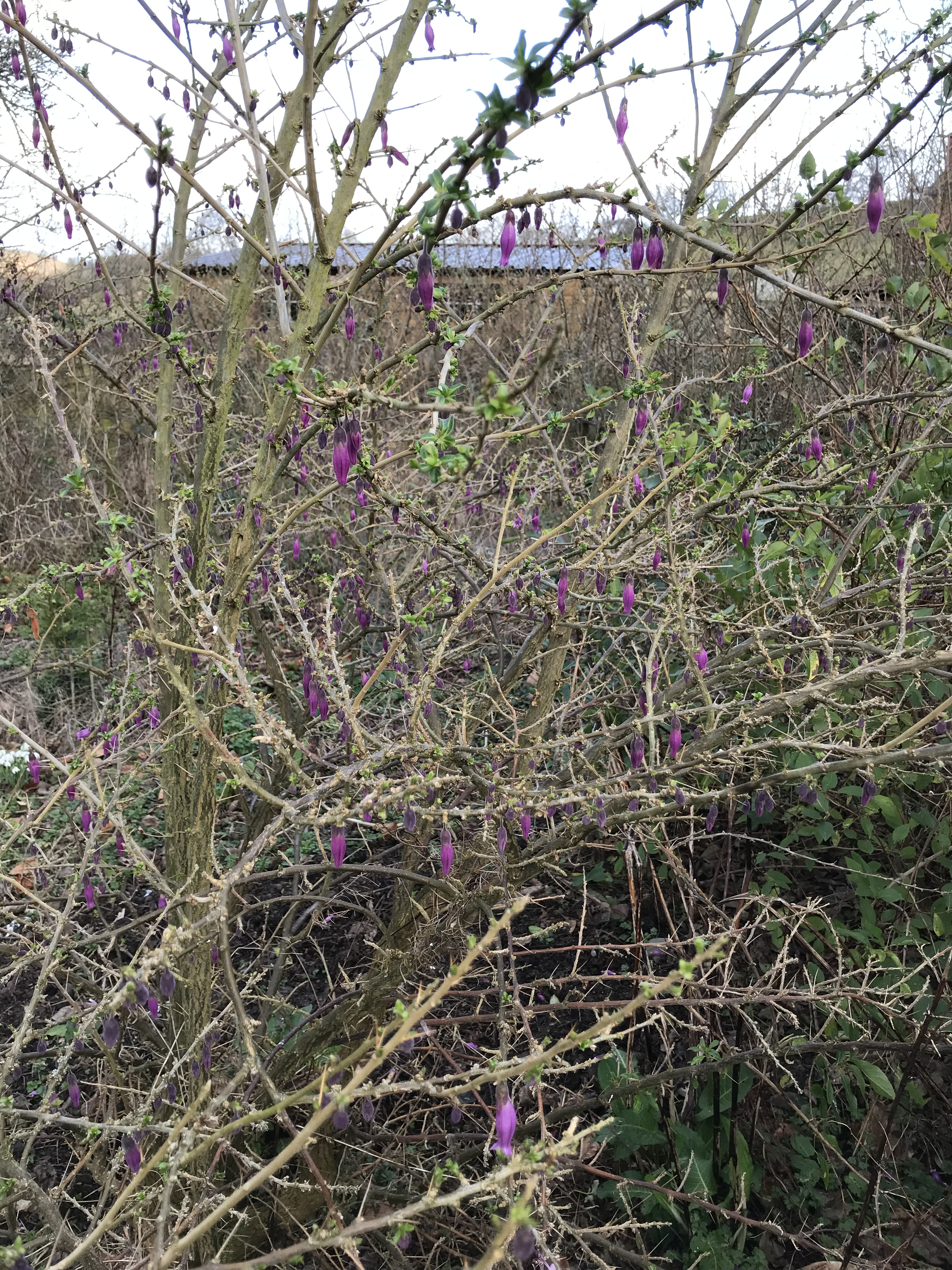
Mature specimen in bud in mid-February, Adforton, Herefordshire

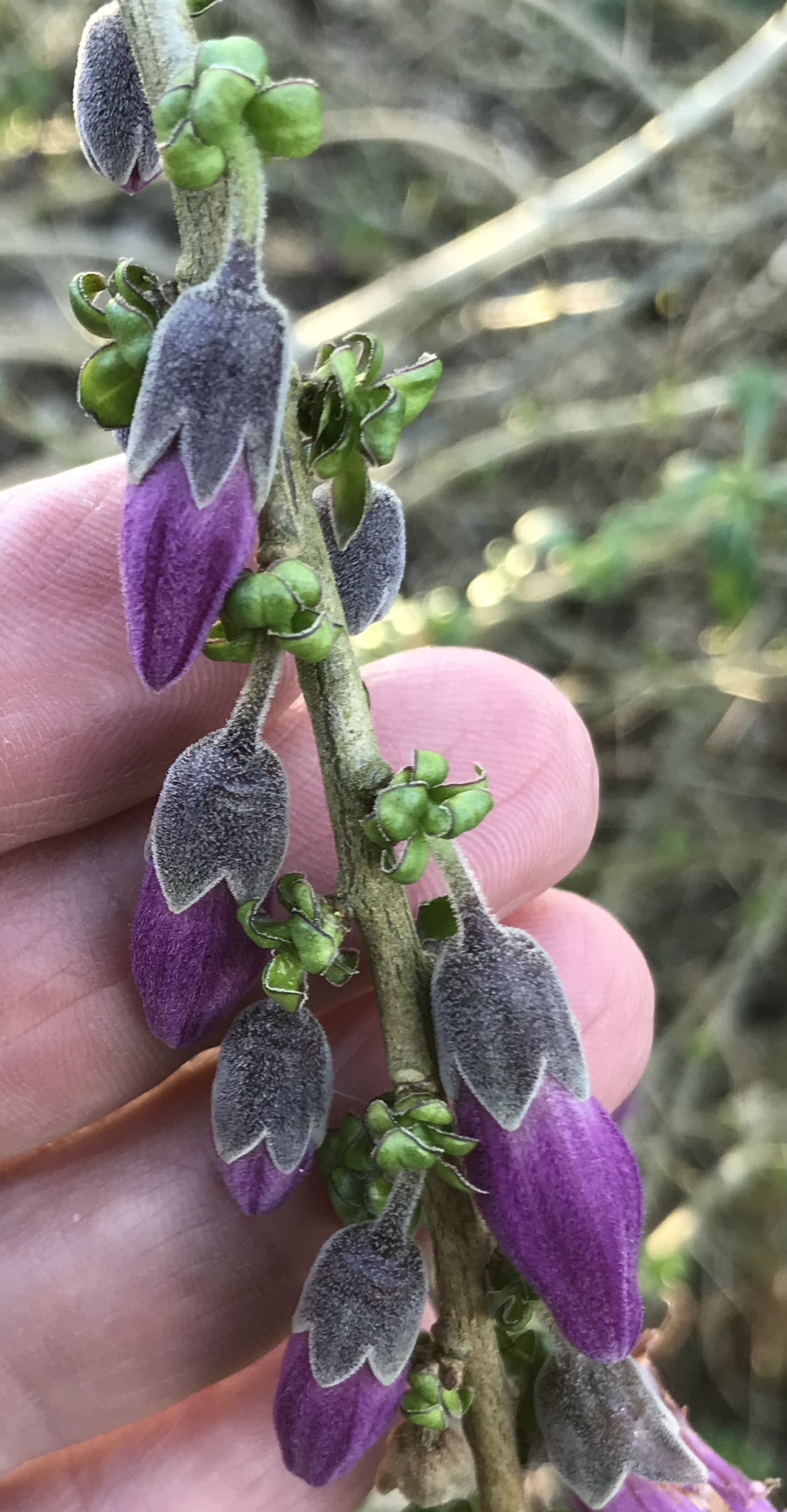
Detail of flower bud-laden stem with human fingers for scale

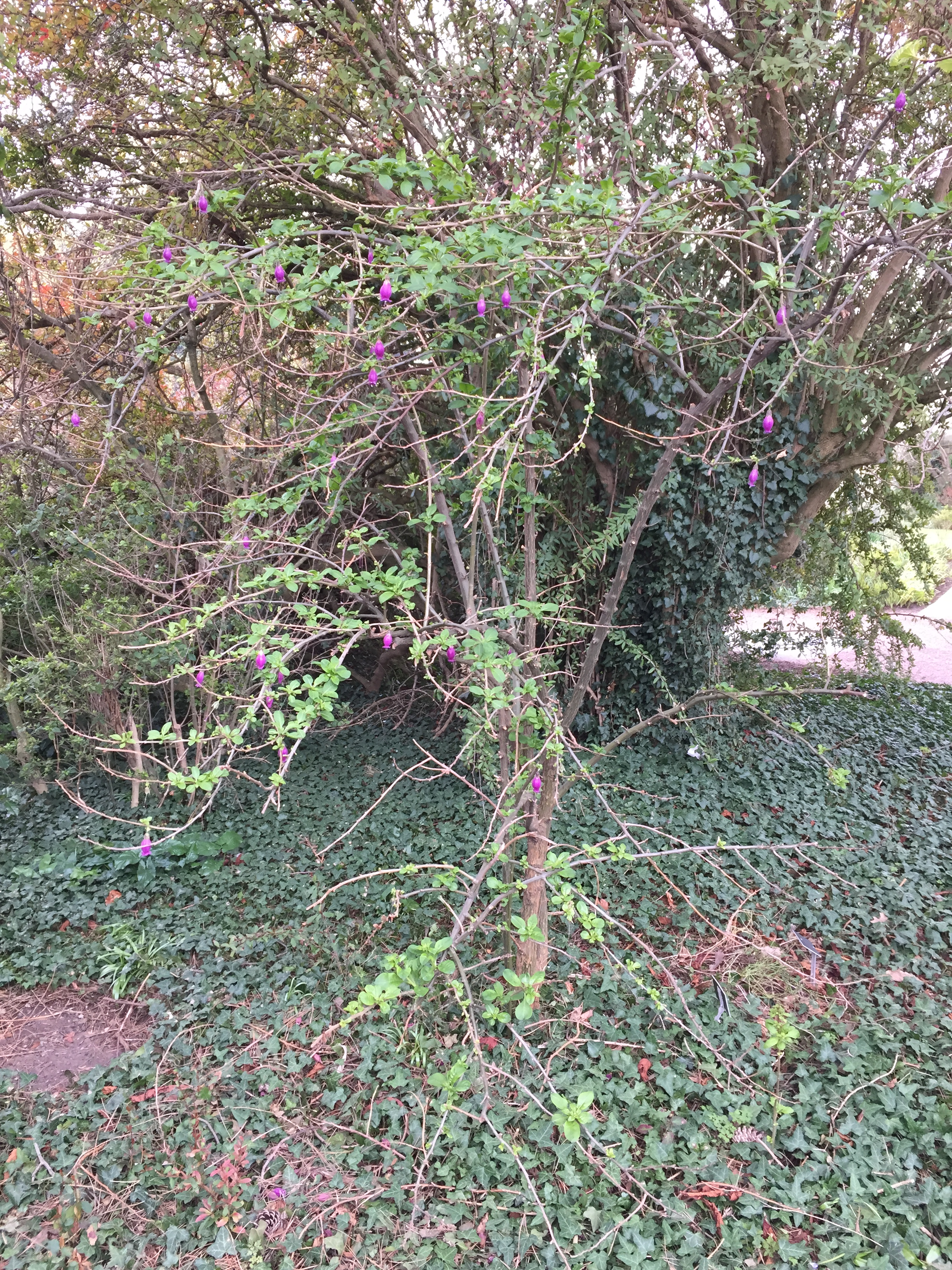
Mature specimen in leaf and full bloom, late April, Royal Botanic Garden Edinburgh Scotland

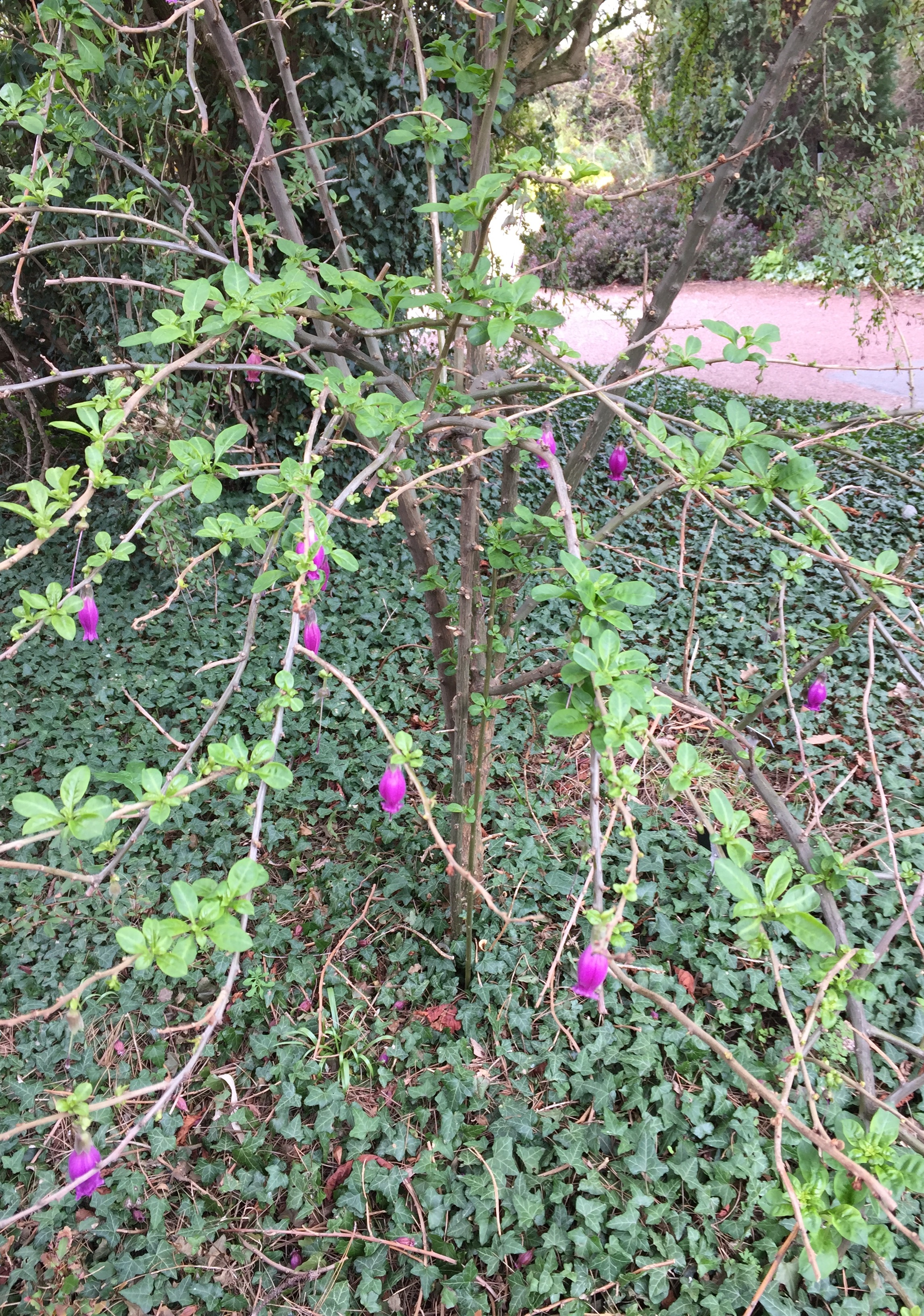
Weeping/arching habit of lower branches of mature specimen flowering in Royal Botanic Garden Edinburgh

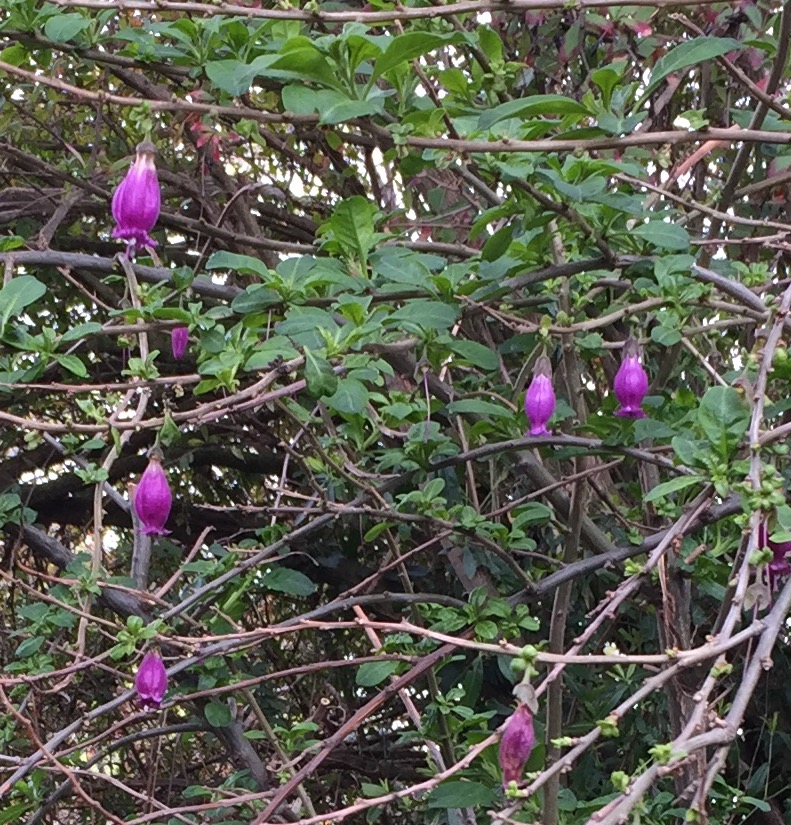
Pendent flowers among Spring shoots on arching branches

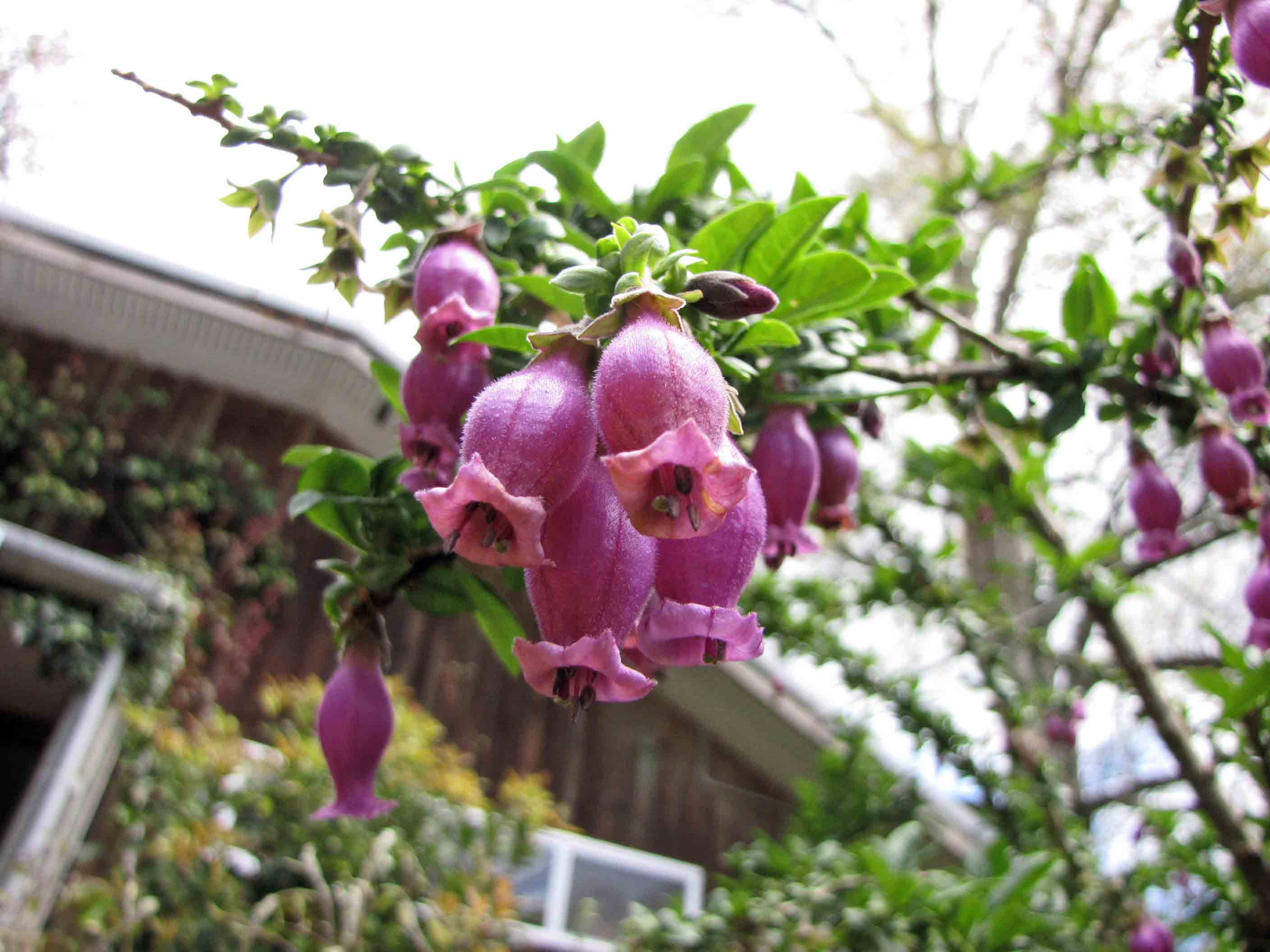
Flower cluster borne by cultivated plant in mid-October (southern Spring), St. Erth gardens, Victoria, Australia

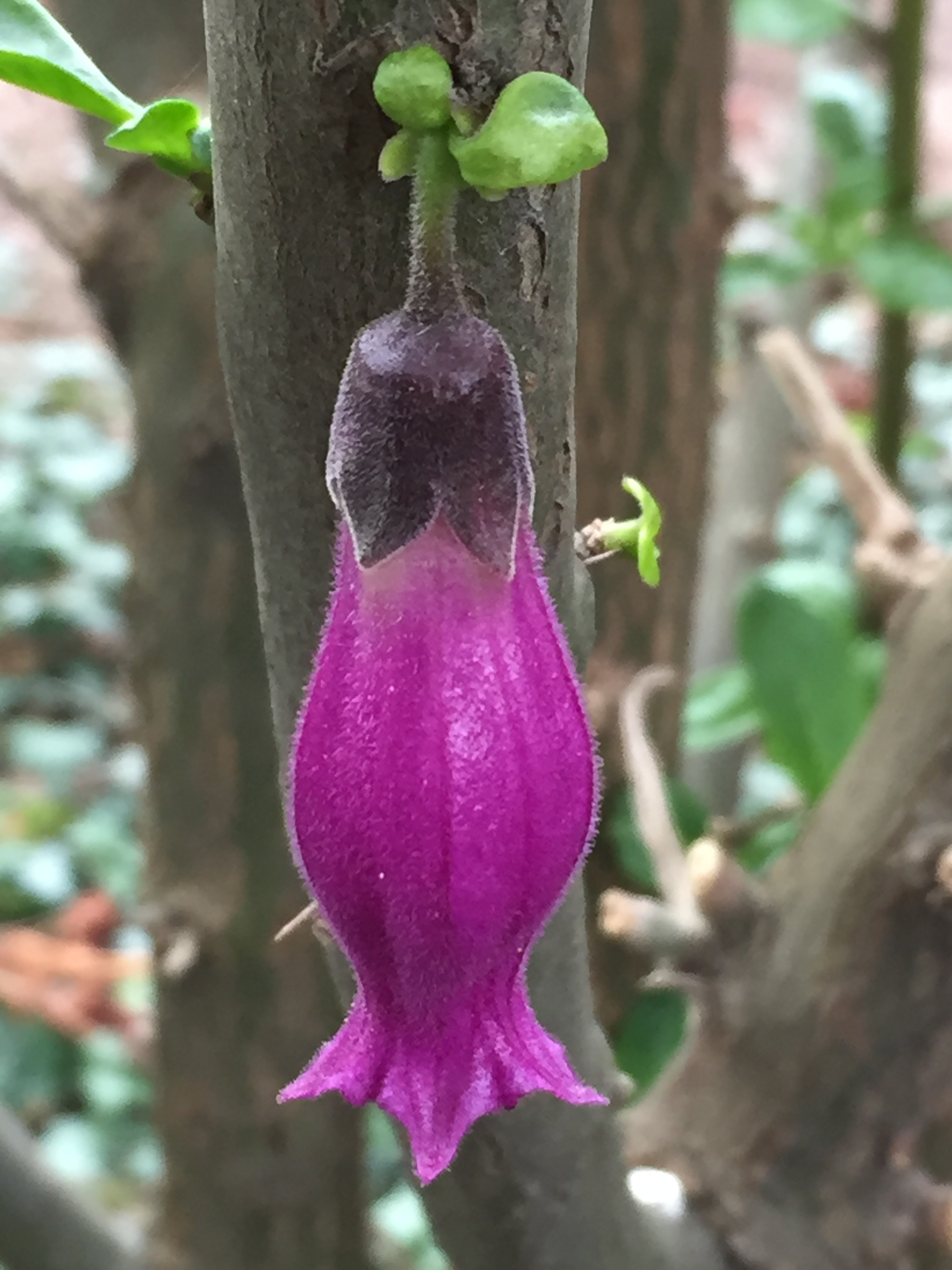
Mature specimen in Royal Botanic Garden Edinburgh exhibiting cauliflory

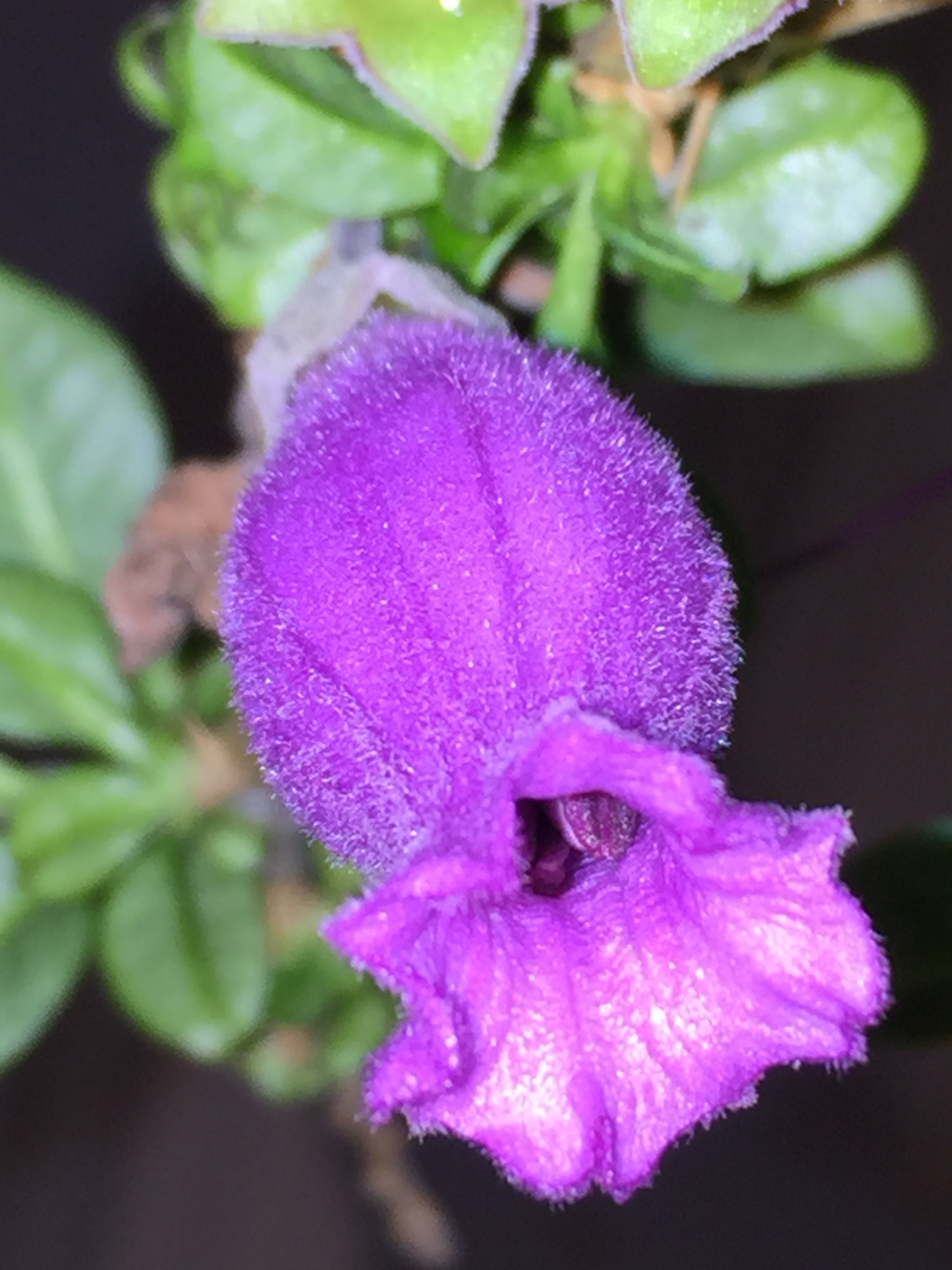
Flash photo of flower, showing undehisced anthers

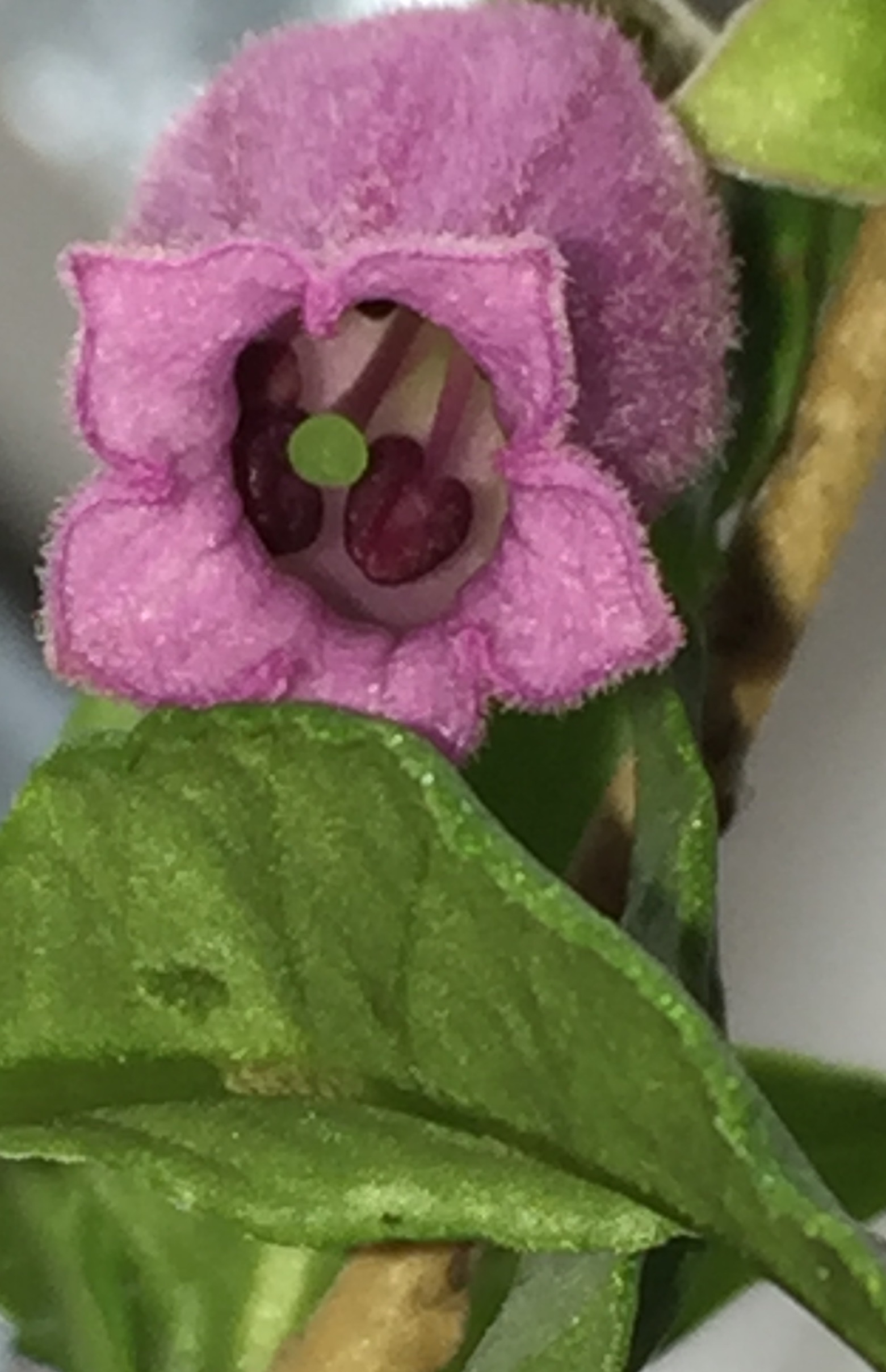
Green stigma and unripe, cordate, purple anthers

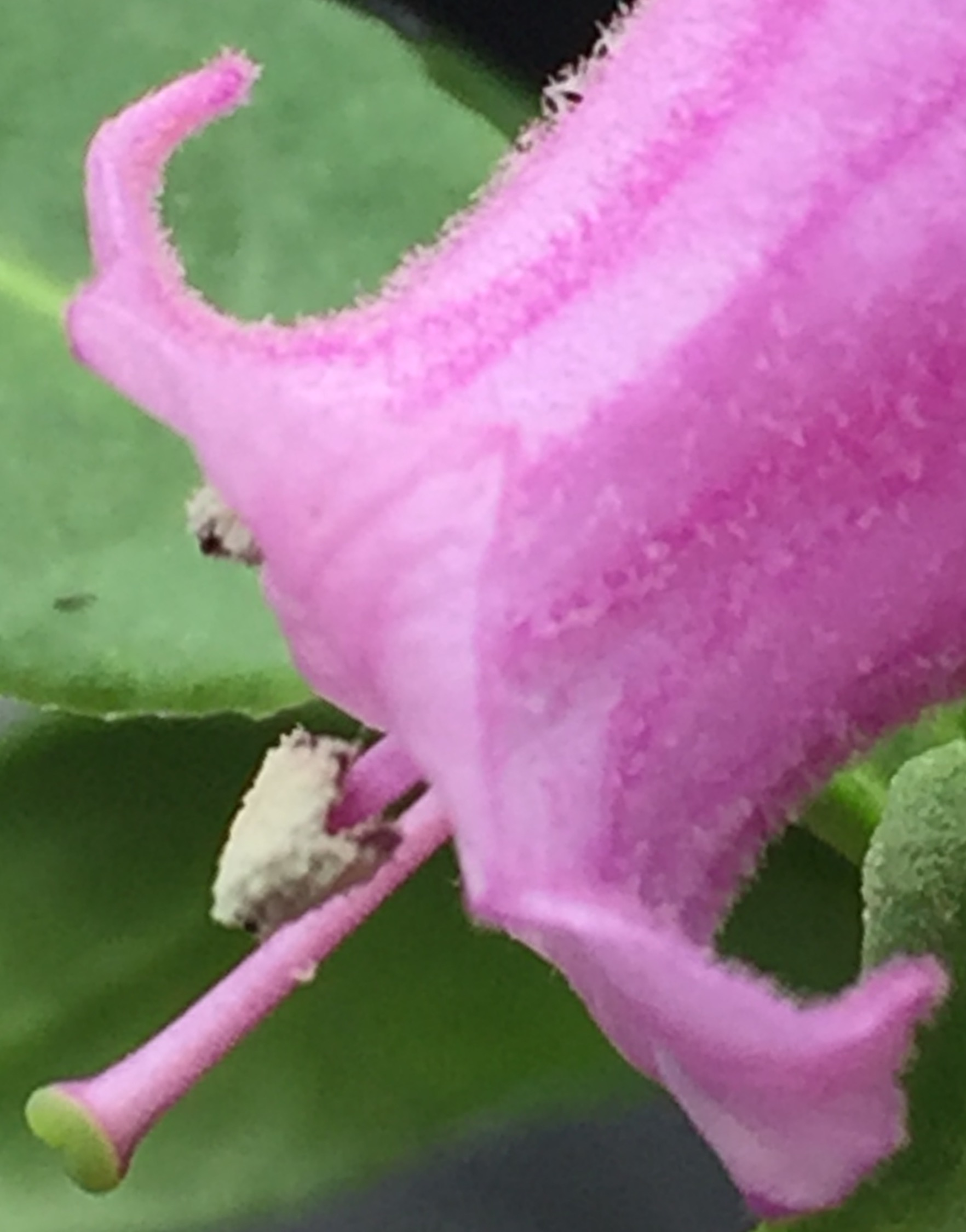
Commissure of contrasting magenta style and green, capitate stigma of exserted pistil

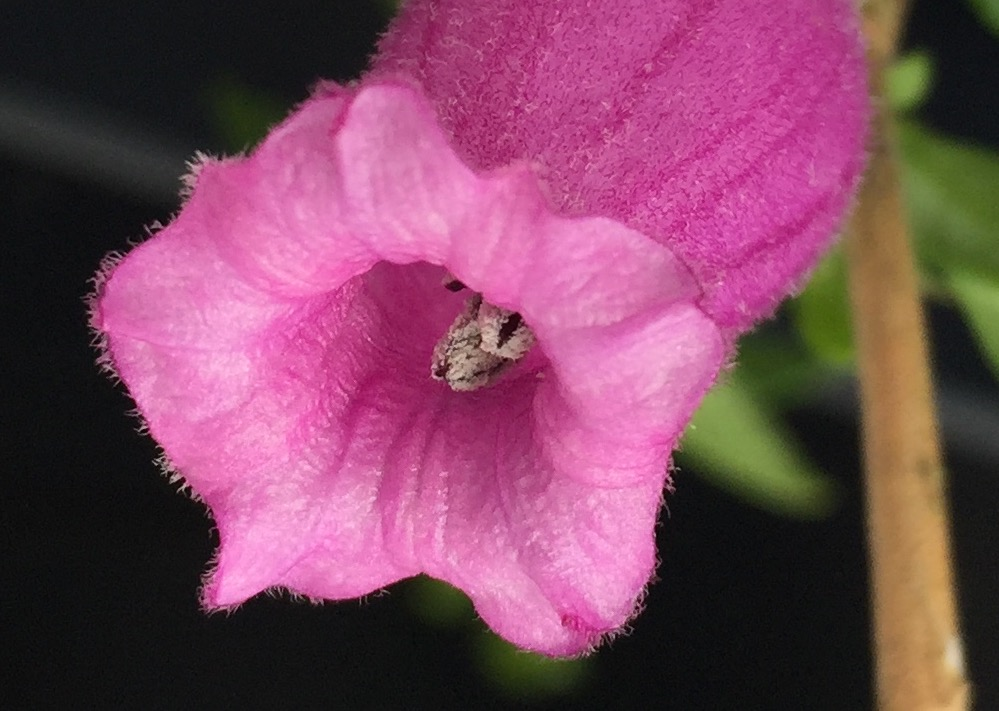
Corolla mouth, showing folding of interior of limb and ripe anthers

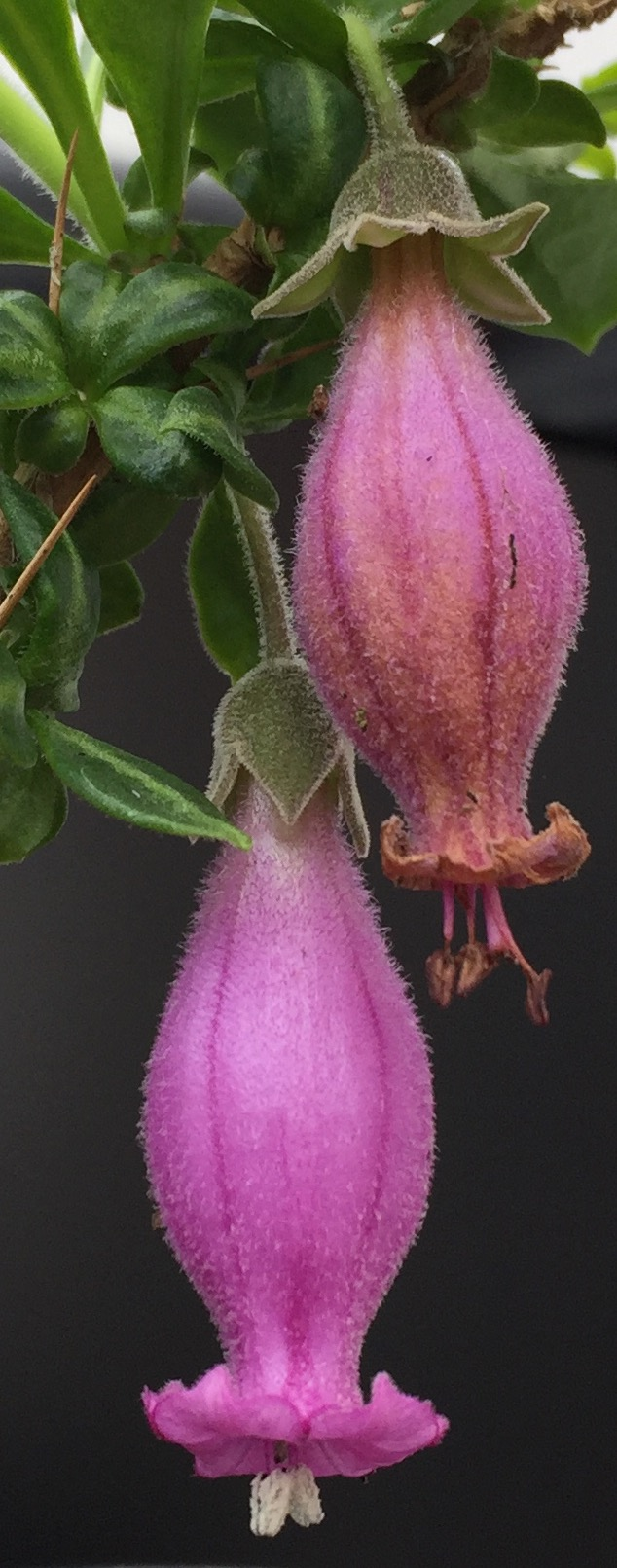
Mature and senescent flowers, displaying exserted anthers

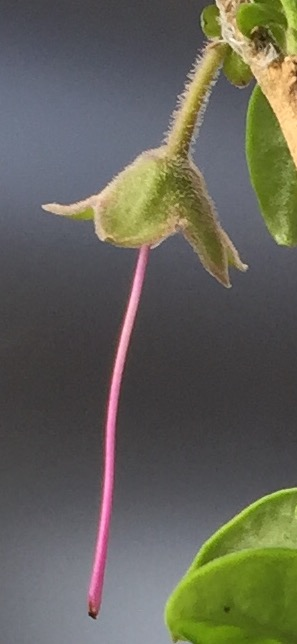
Magenta style, persisting after fall of corolla

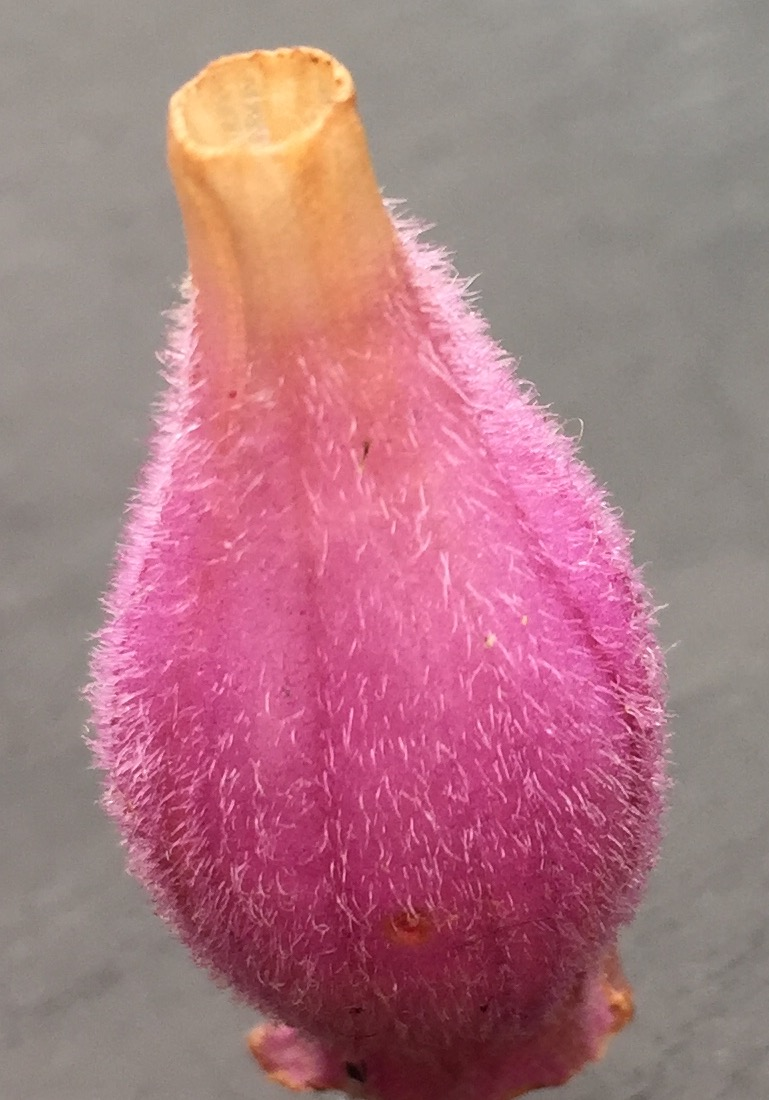
Fallen corolla, positioned upright to show side view of tube

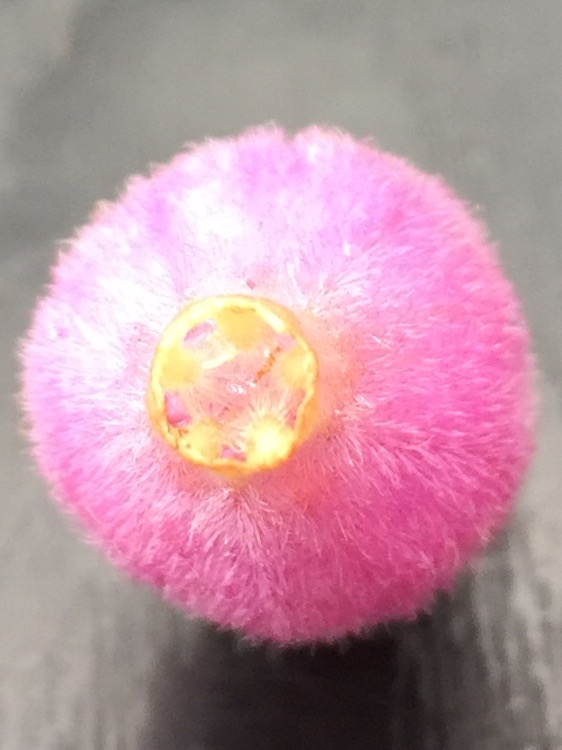
Base of a fallen corolla, showing fused, hairy bases of stamens, which confer structural strength

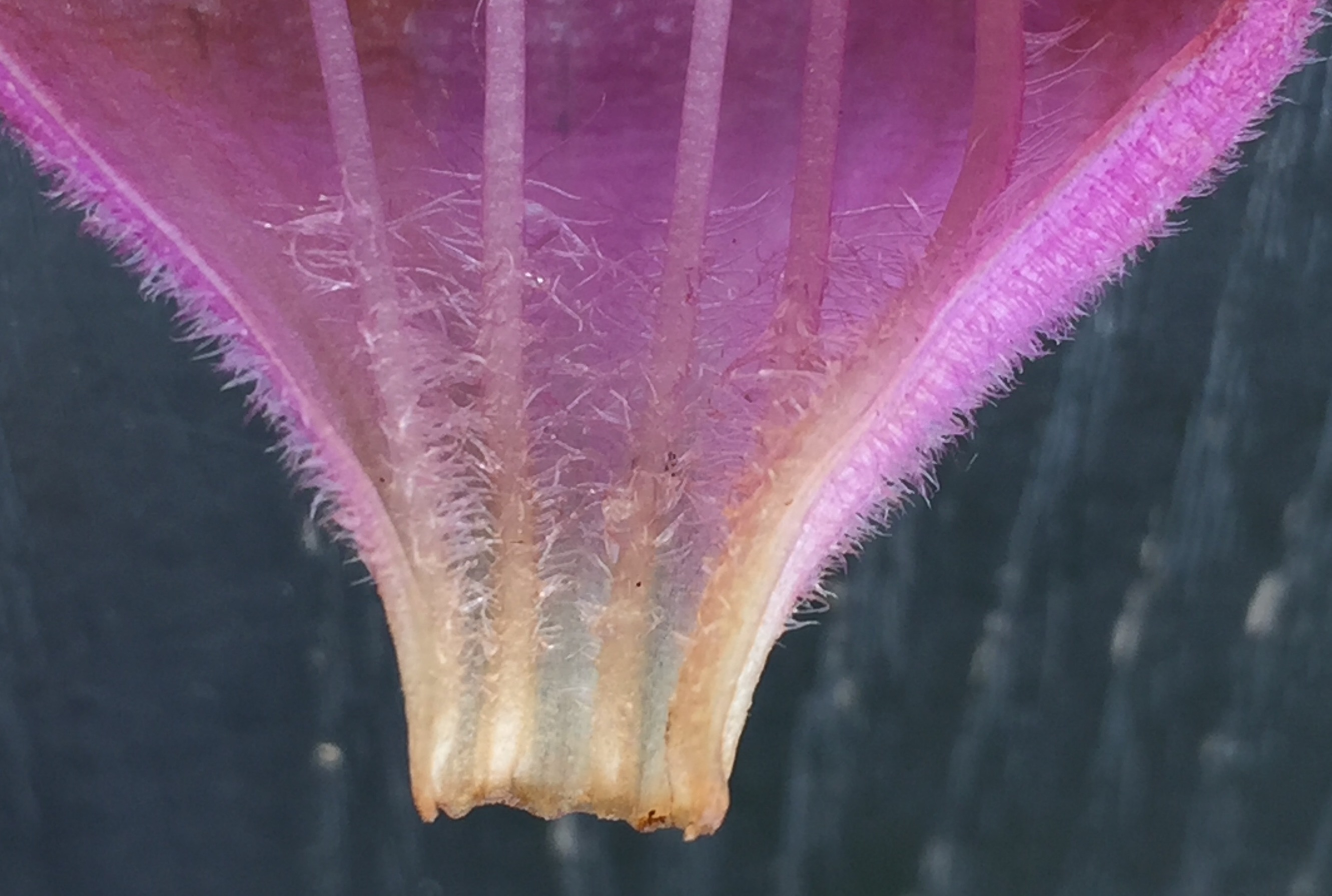
Dissection of fallen corolla showing hairy stamen bases fused to interior

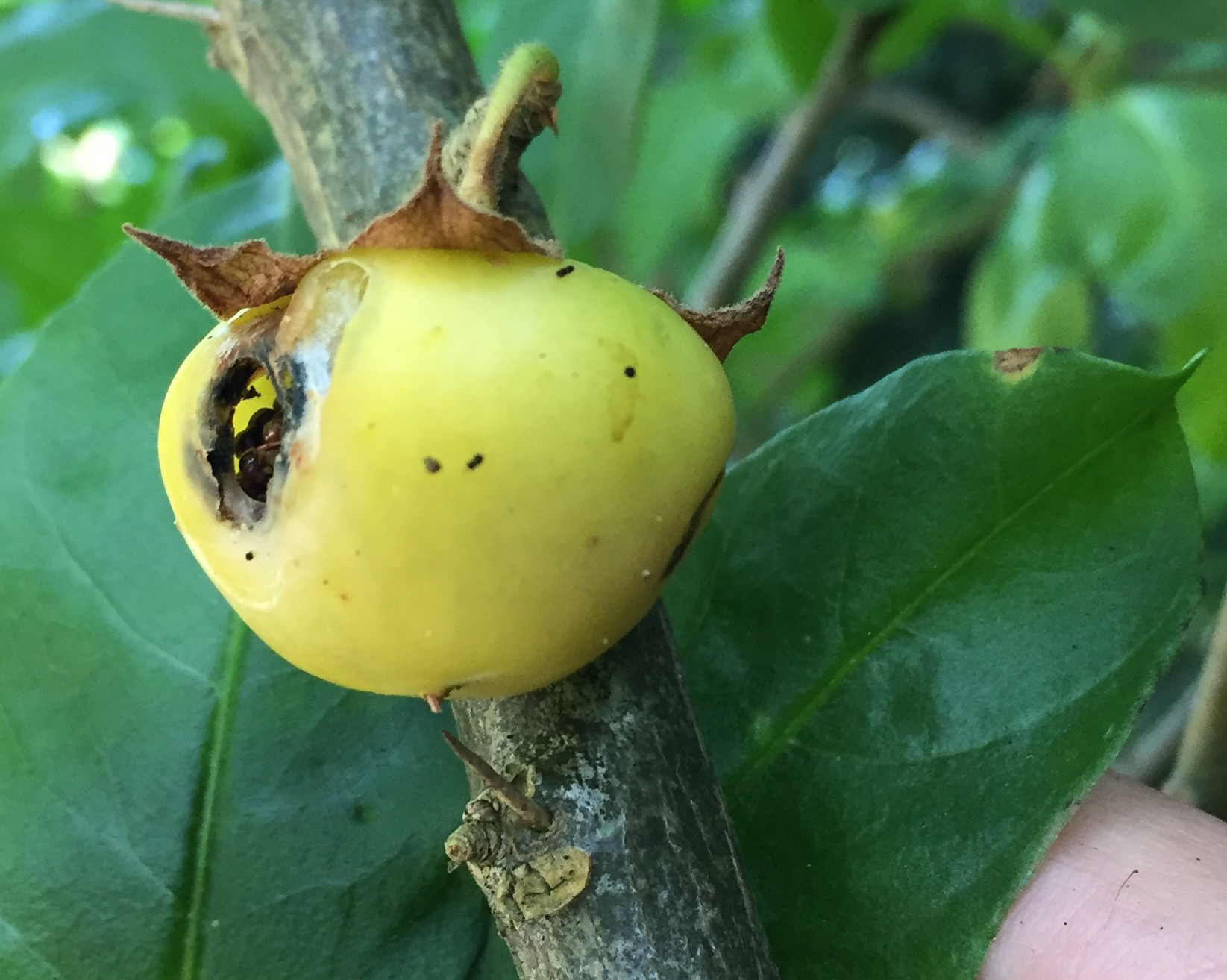
Single, insect and/or mollusc-damaged ripe fruit of mature specimen, Logan Botanic Garden

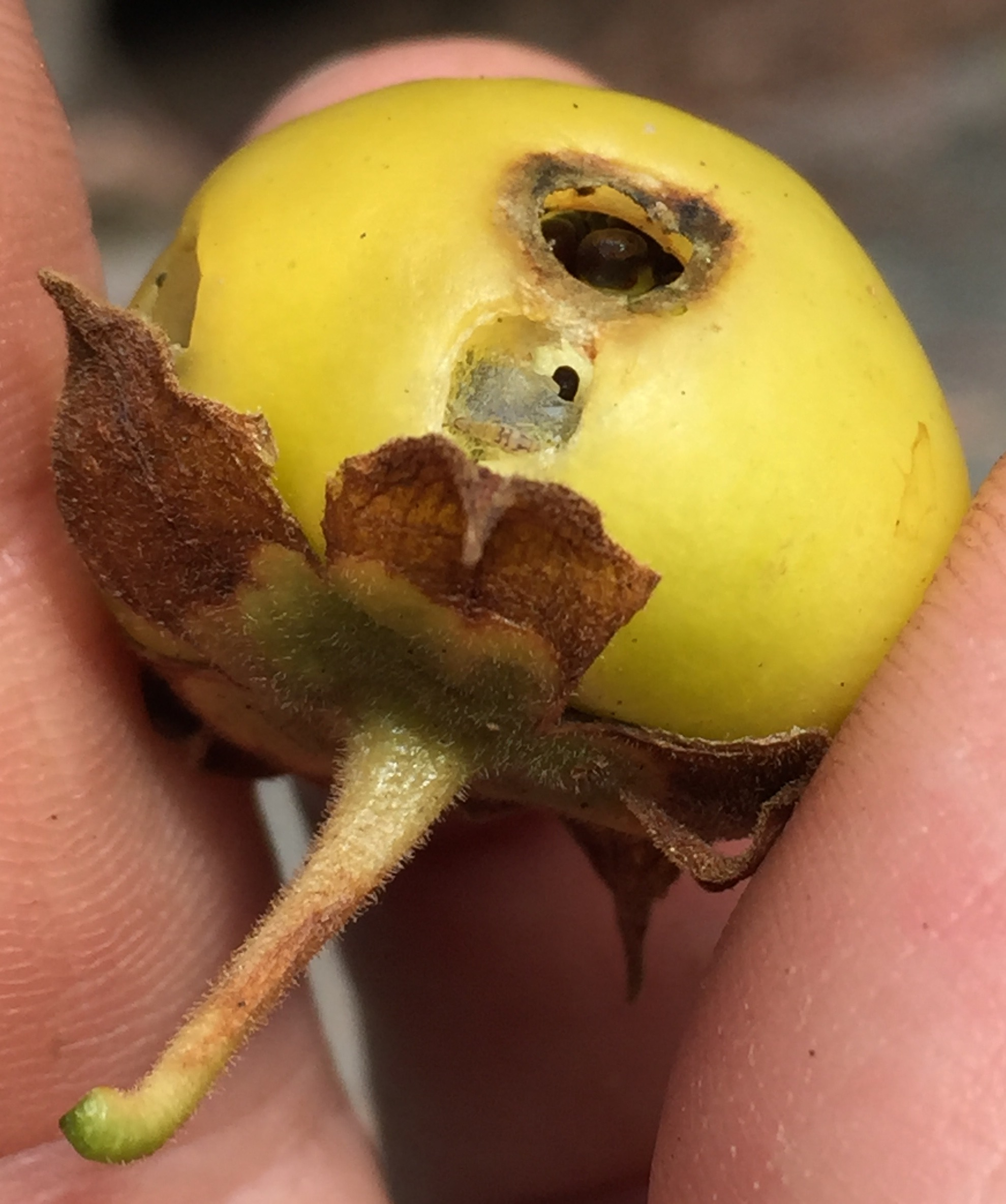
Same fruit (after having fallen) held up to show pubescent pedicel and broad calyx lobes

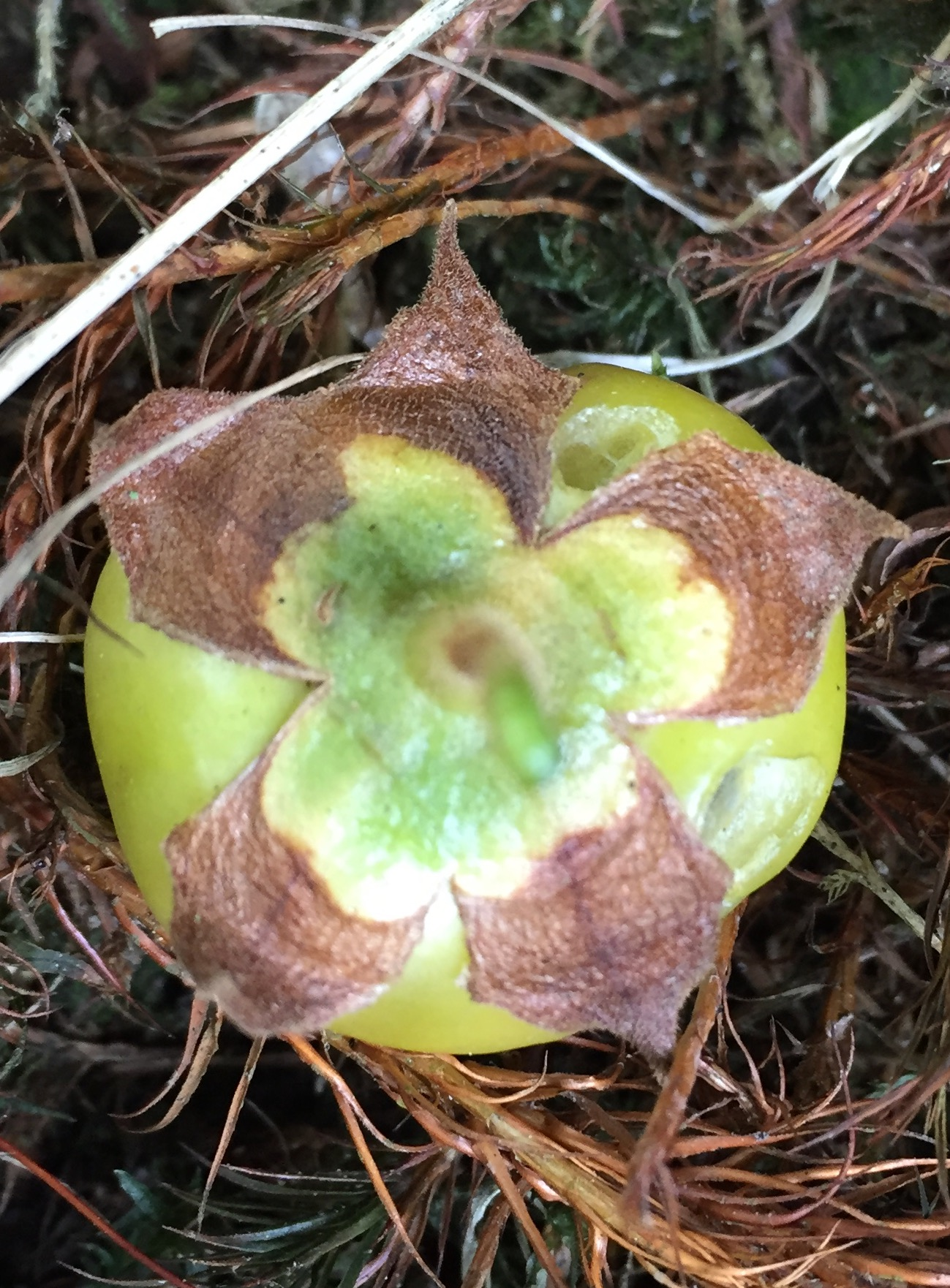
Same fruit, positioned pedicel-uppermost to show distinctive broad, spreading calyx lobes, turning brown with age

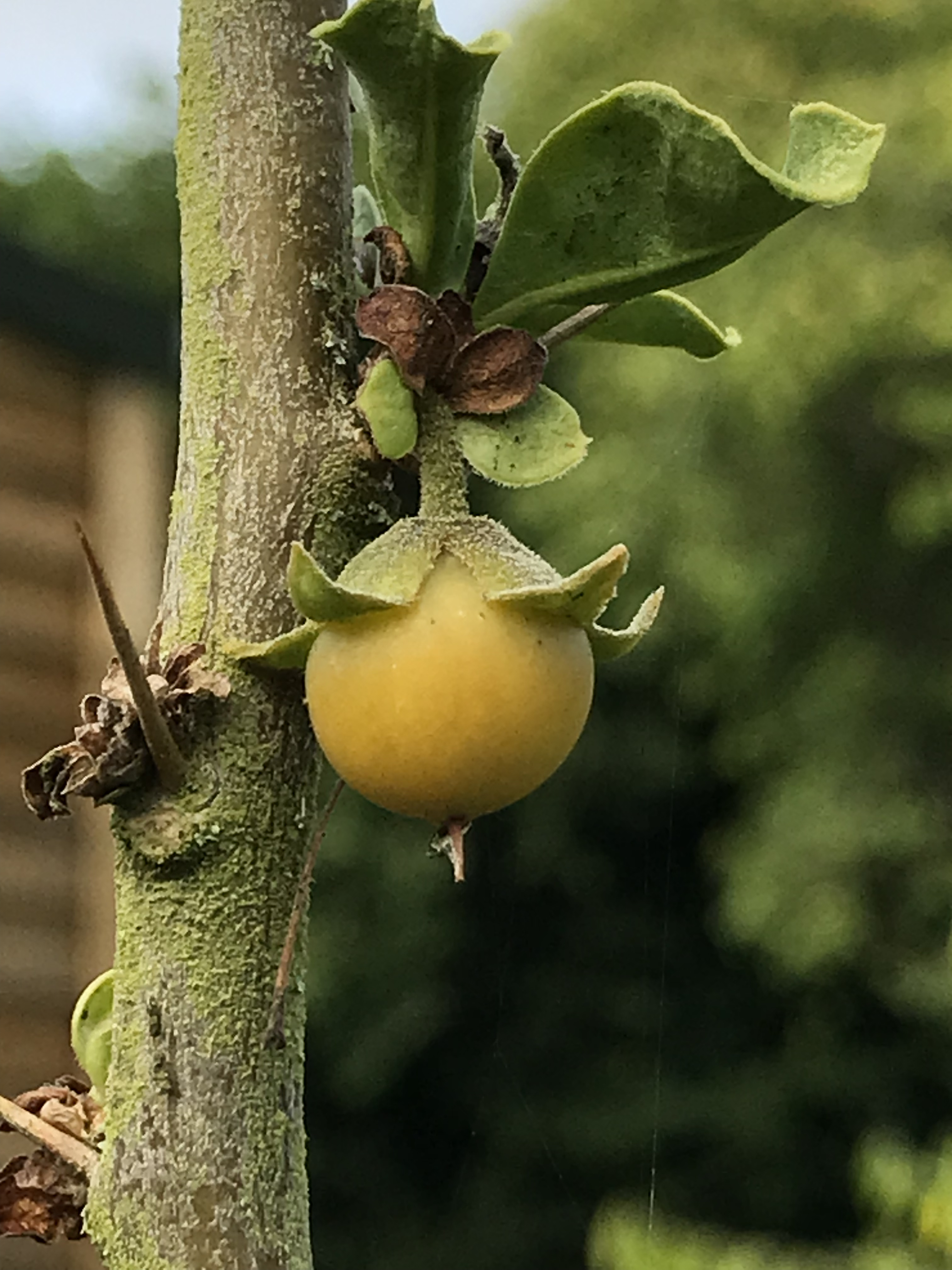
Ripe fruit with remains of pistil, on plant exhibiting signs of dieback caused possibly by dry air, Adforton

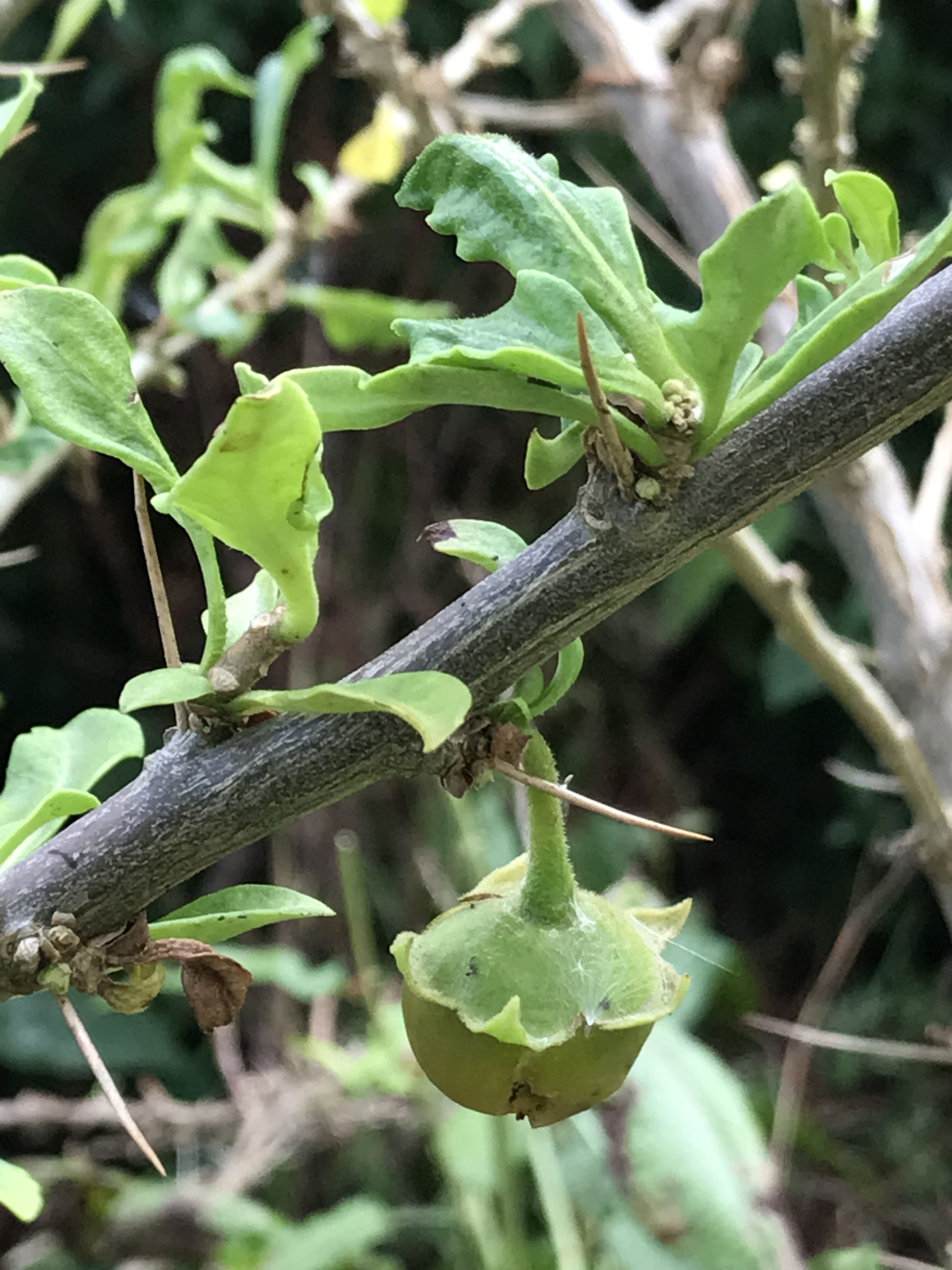
Ripe fruit, showing broad, green calyx, borne on arching, spiny stem, Adforton

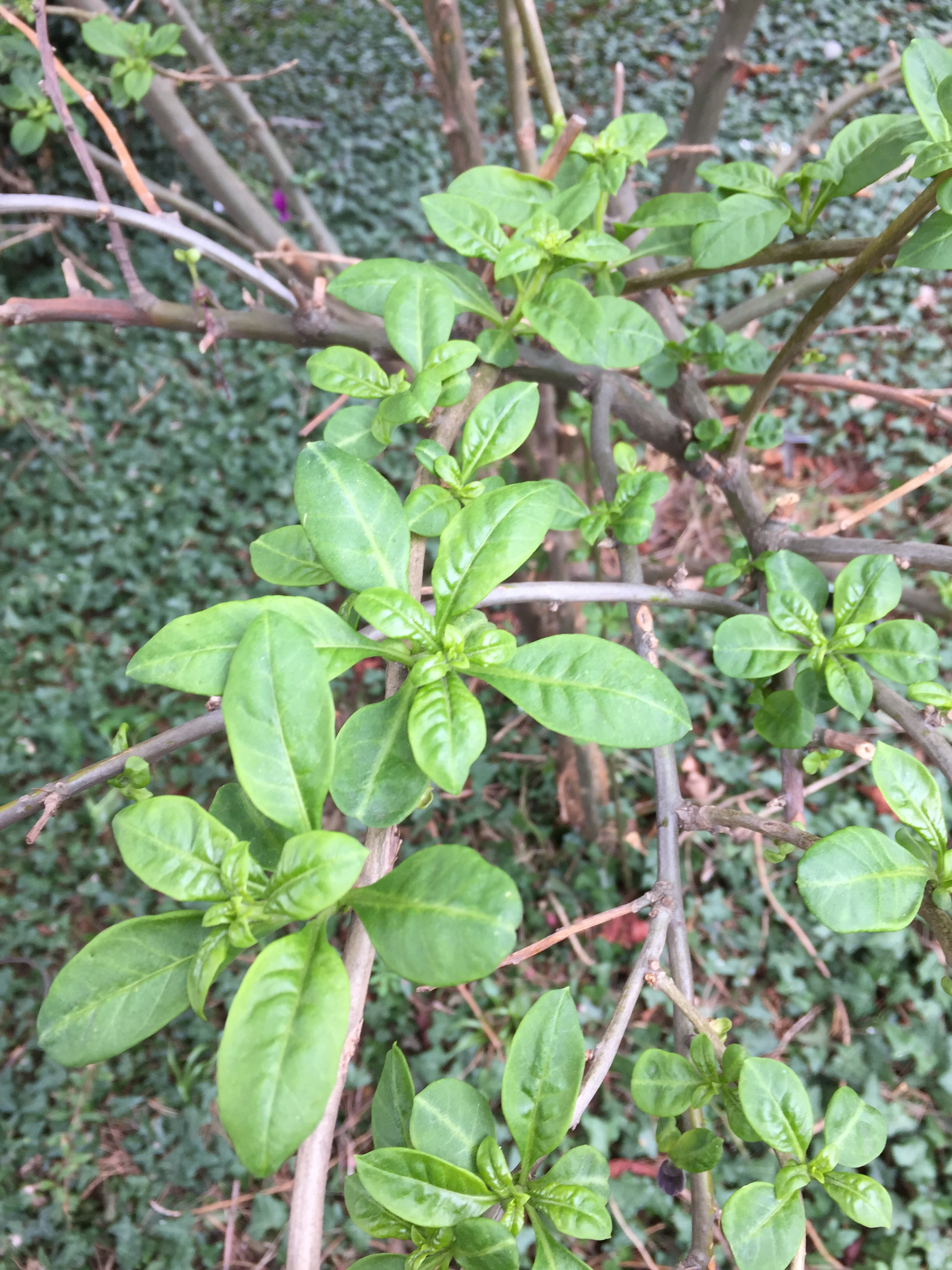
Spring shoots, emerging from older, arching growth of mature specimen, Royal Botanic Garden Edinburgh

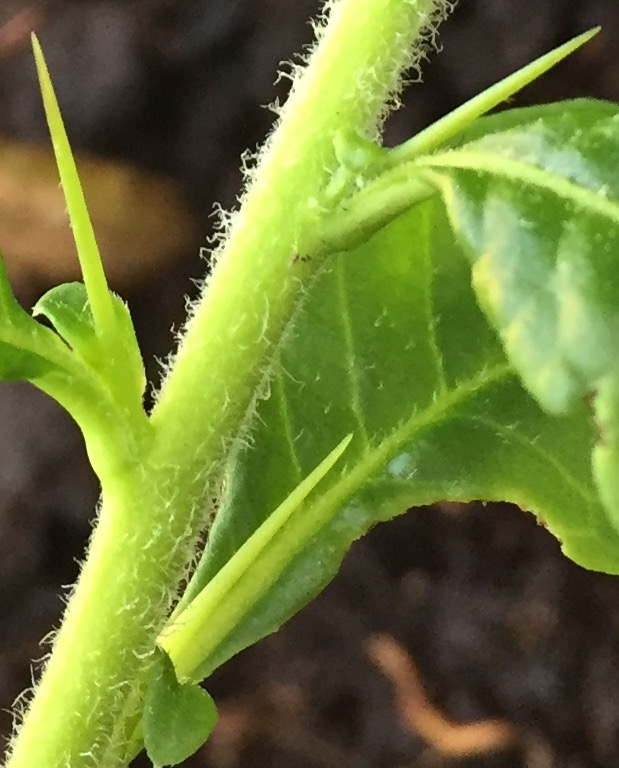
Young spines borne with cataphylls in leaf axils of vigorous Spring shoot with densely pubescent stem

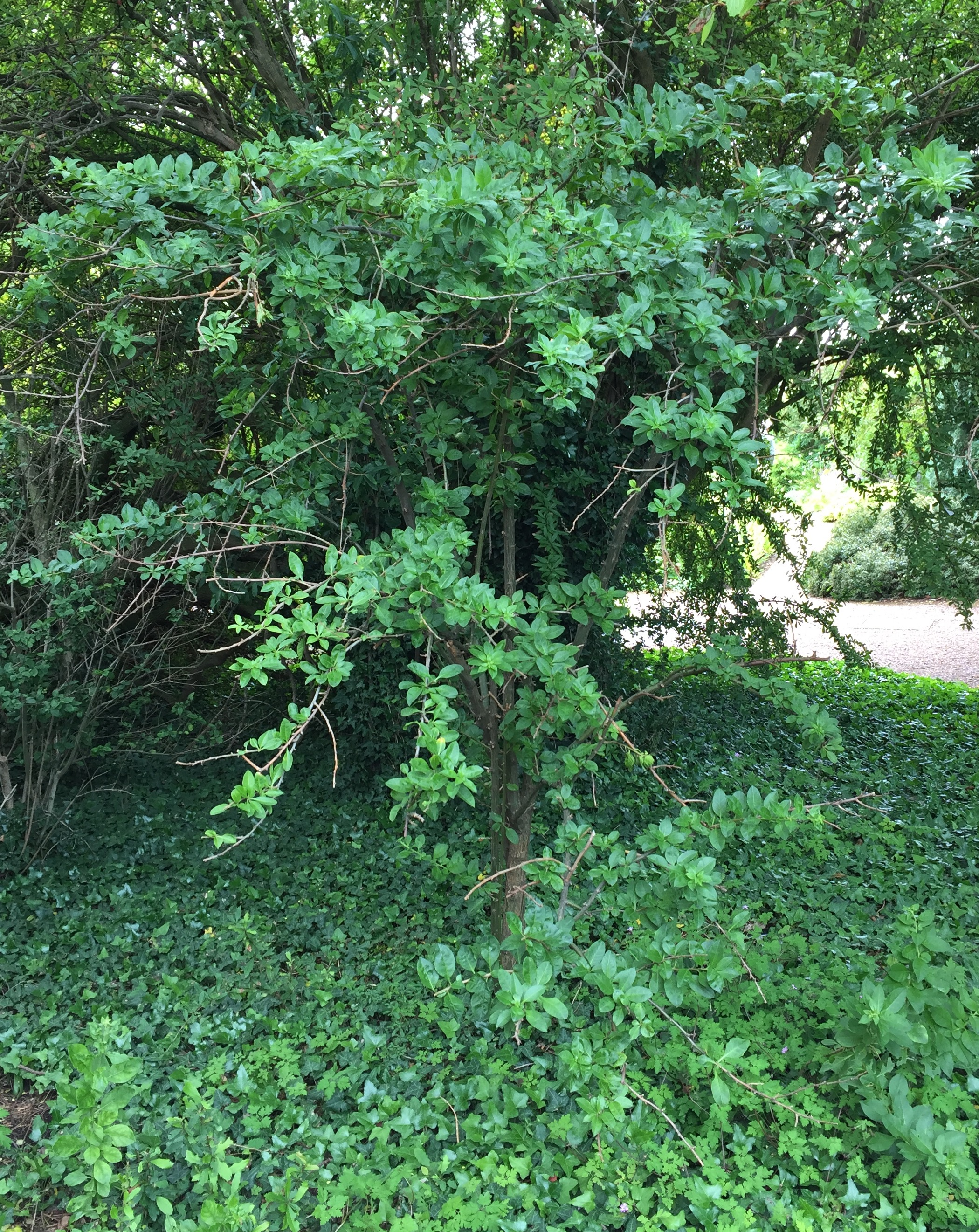
Summer foliage of mature specimen, Royal Botanic Garden Edinburgh

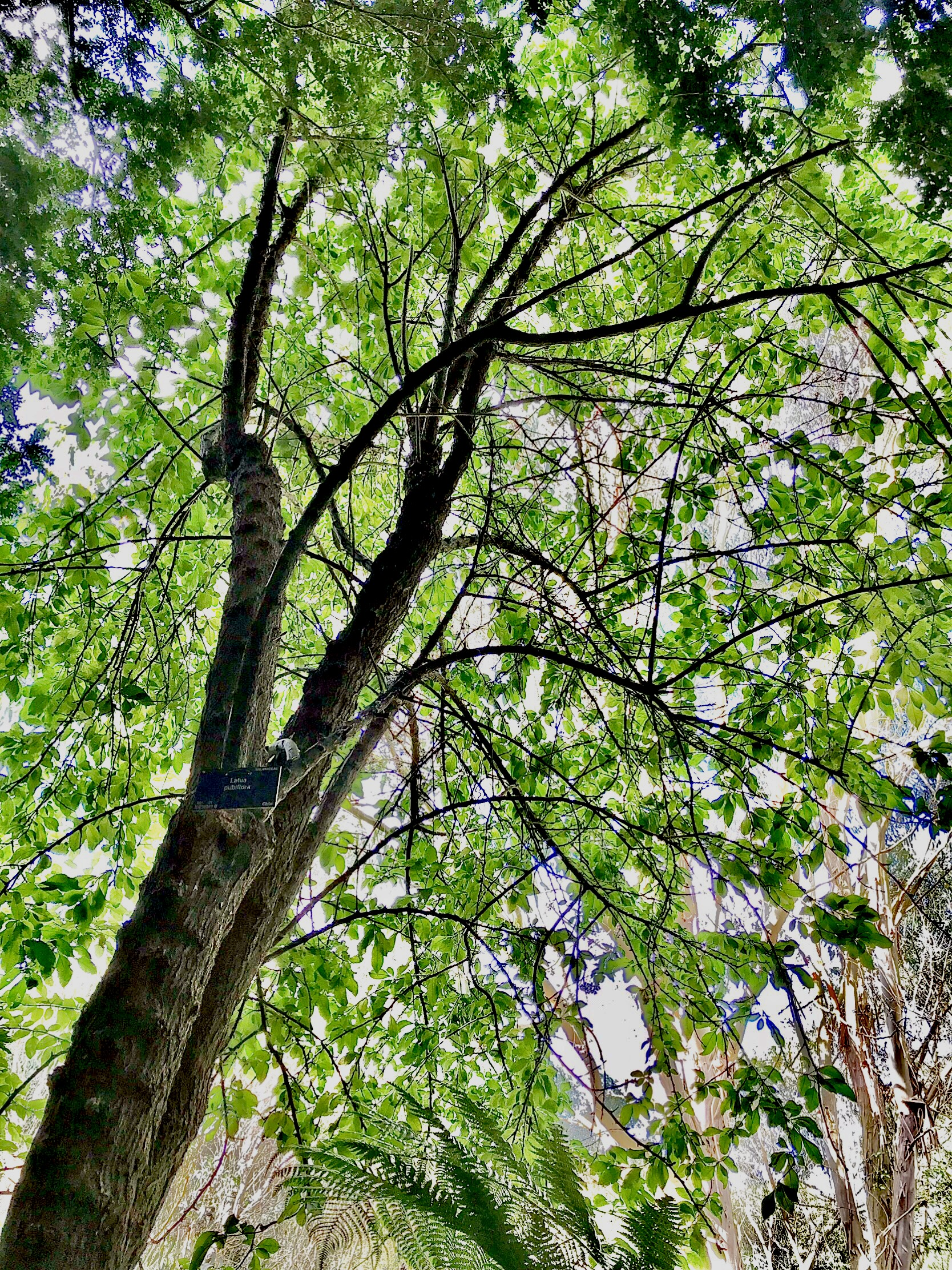
Canopy of 6m arborescent specimen in Logan Botanic Garden, viewed from beneath

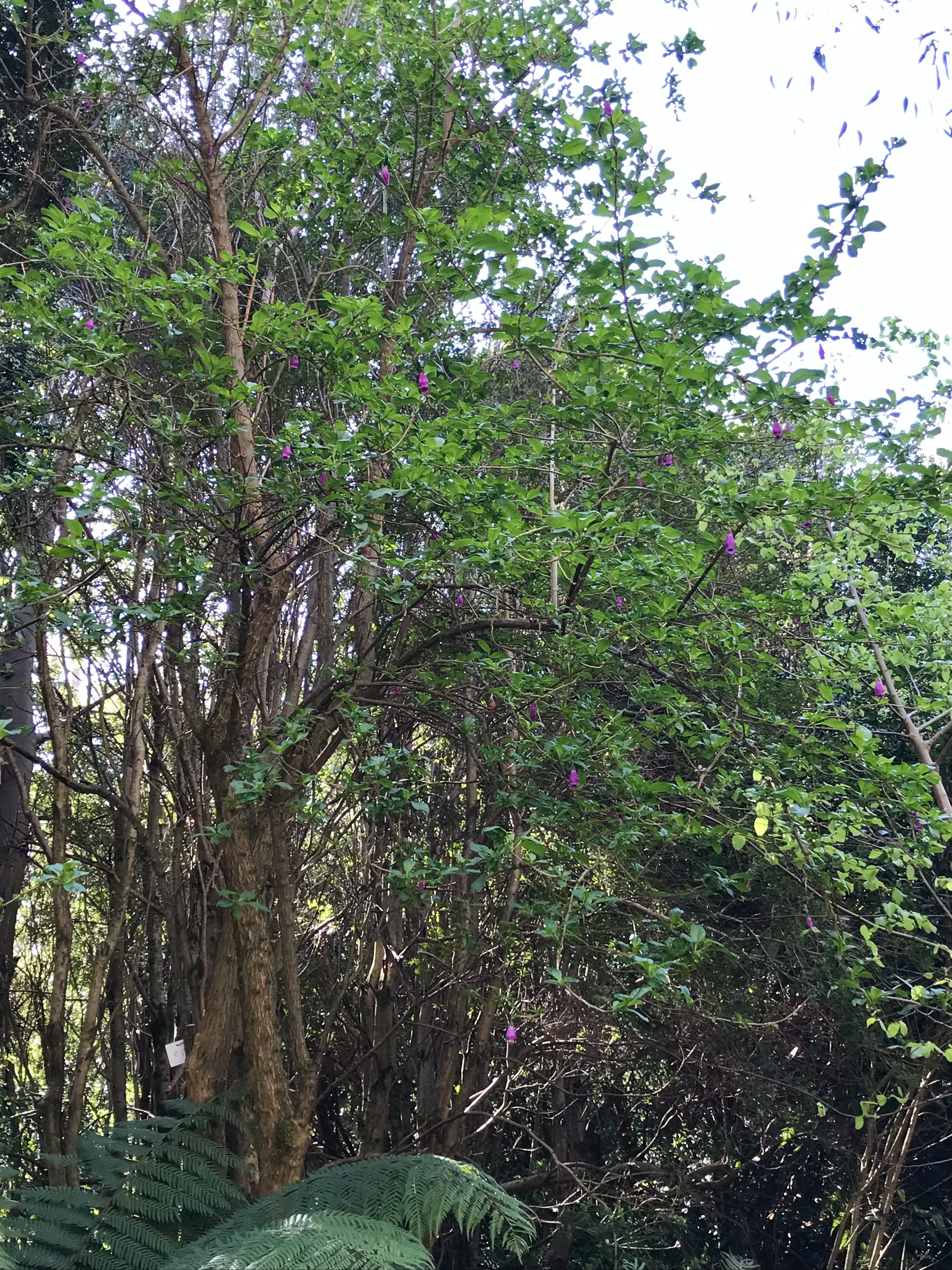
6m Logan specimen in flower 10/4/25

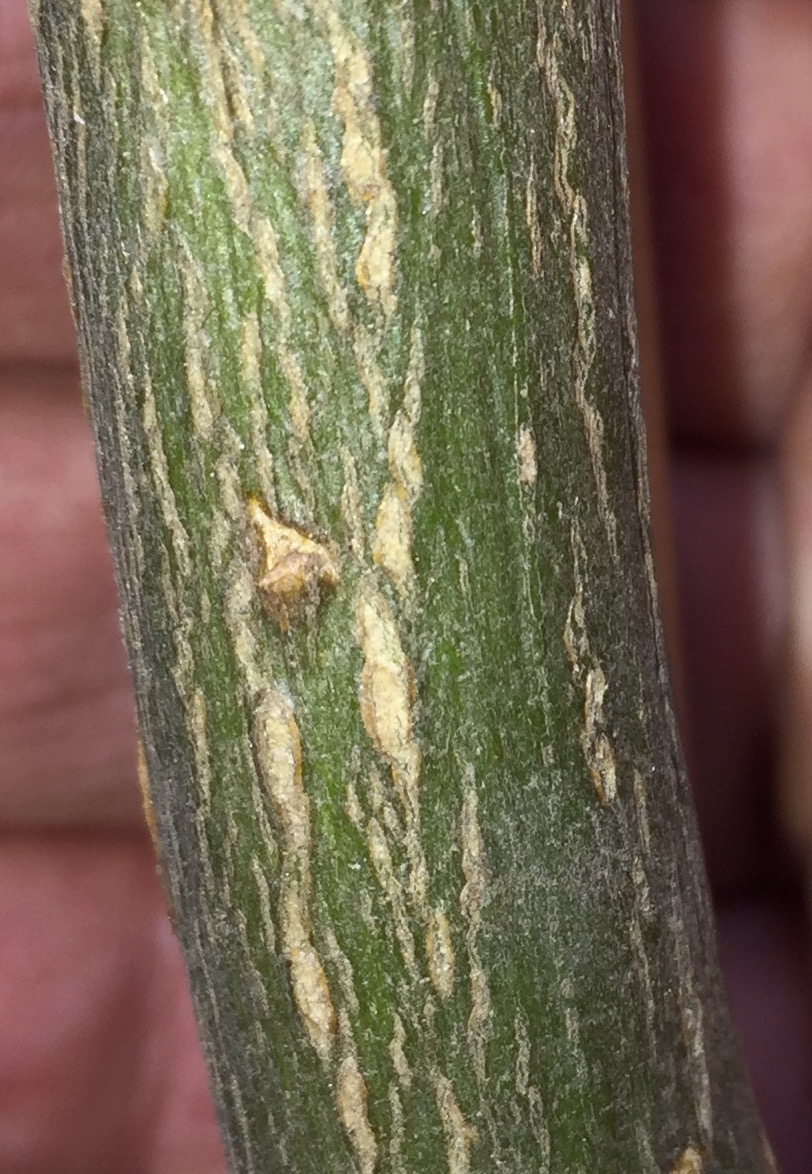
Young, grey-green bark with buff striations of trunk of young specimen in Royal Botanic Garden Edinburgh

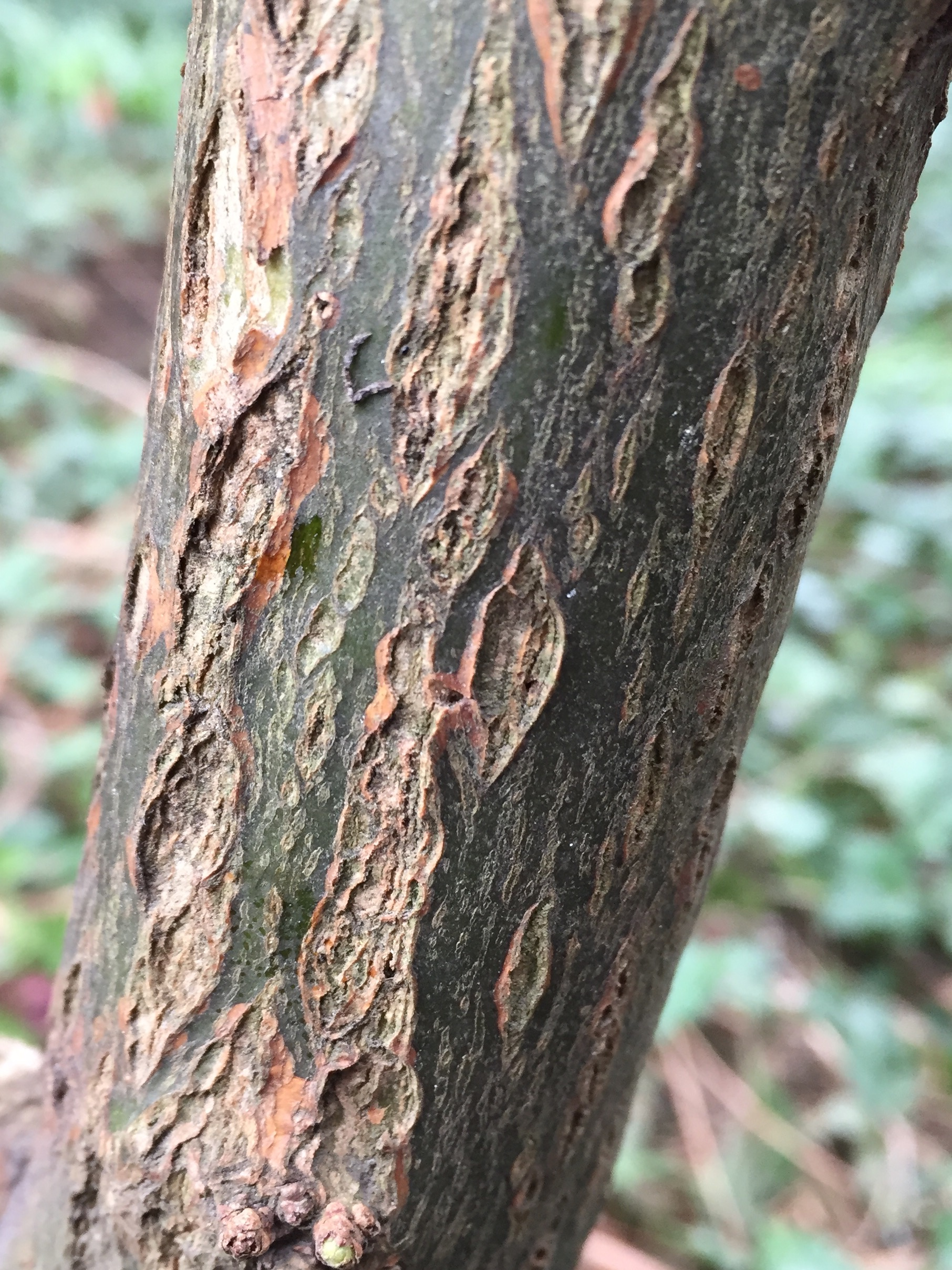
Semi-mature bark displaying development of characteristic corky fissures

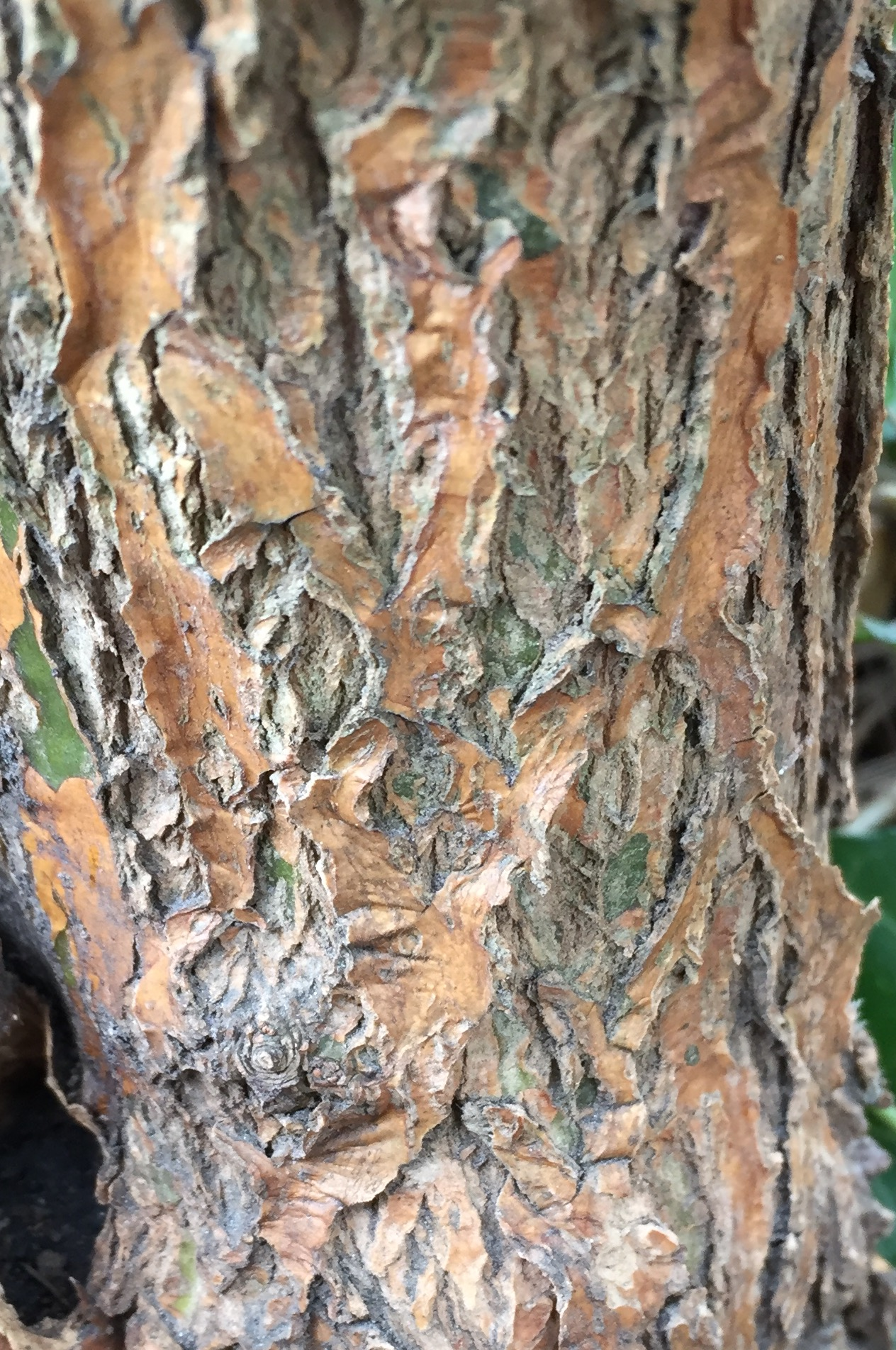
Mature (shrub) bark, clad completely in corky tissue with reticulate pattern. Base of main trunk of mature specimen Royal Botanic Garden Edinburgh.

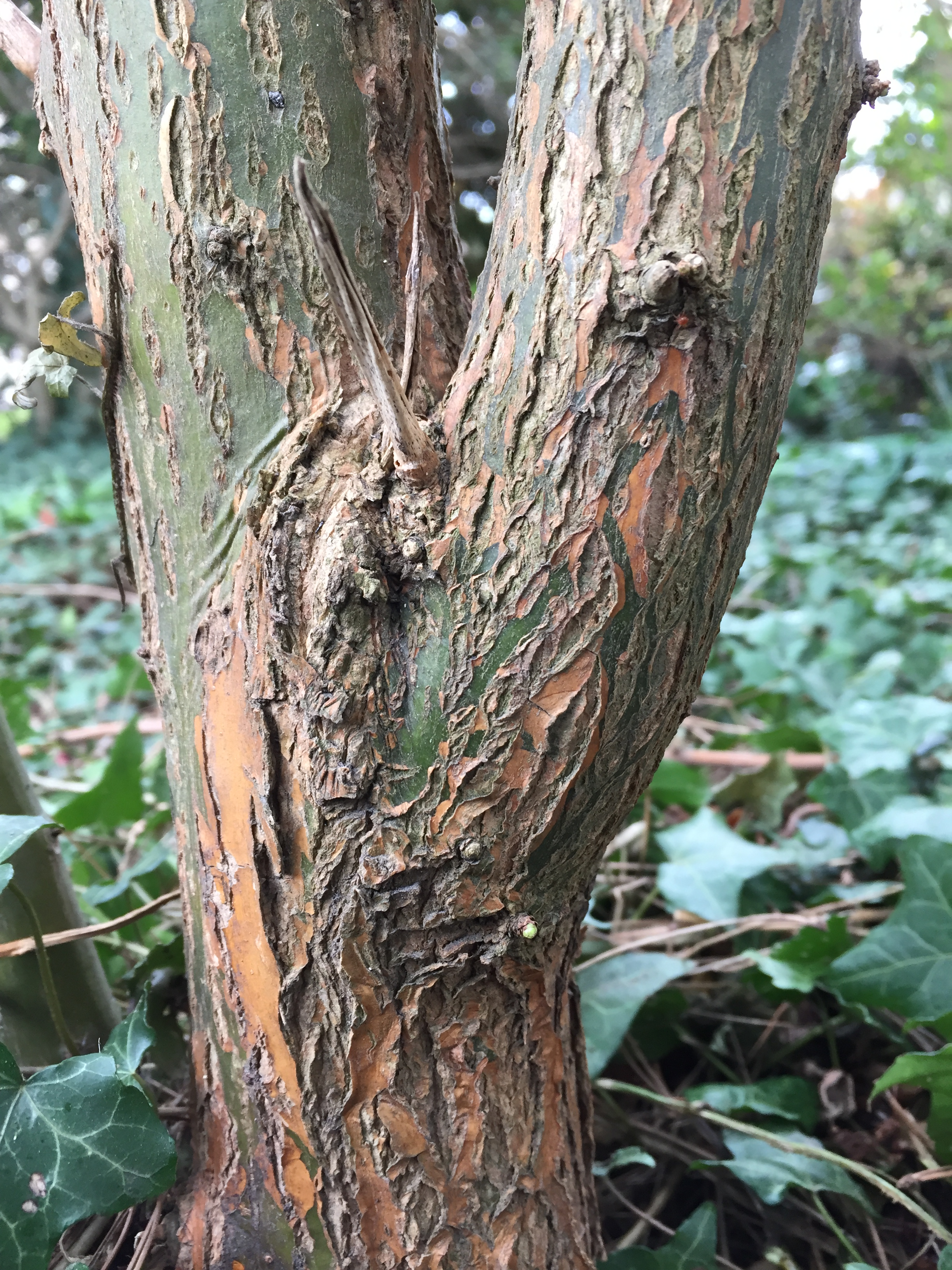
Main trunk (girth 11 cm) of mature shrubby specimen, Royal Botanic Garden Edinburgh

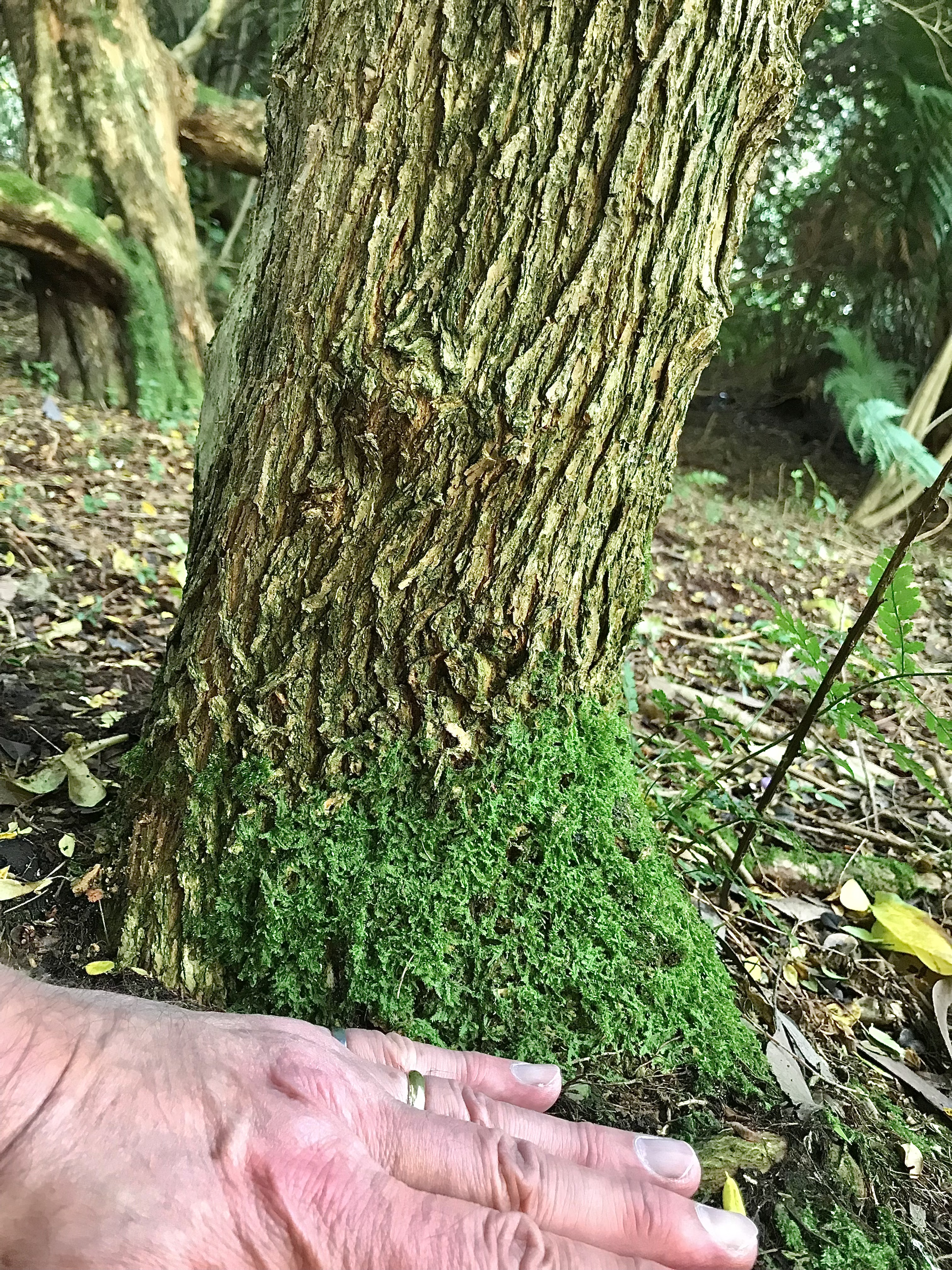
Tree trunk (girth 37 cm) of 6m arborescent specimen, Logan, showing fully mature bark
