= List of Asteraceae genera =

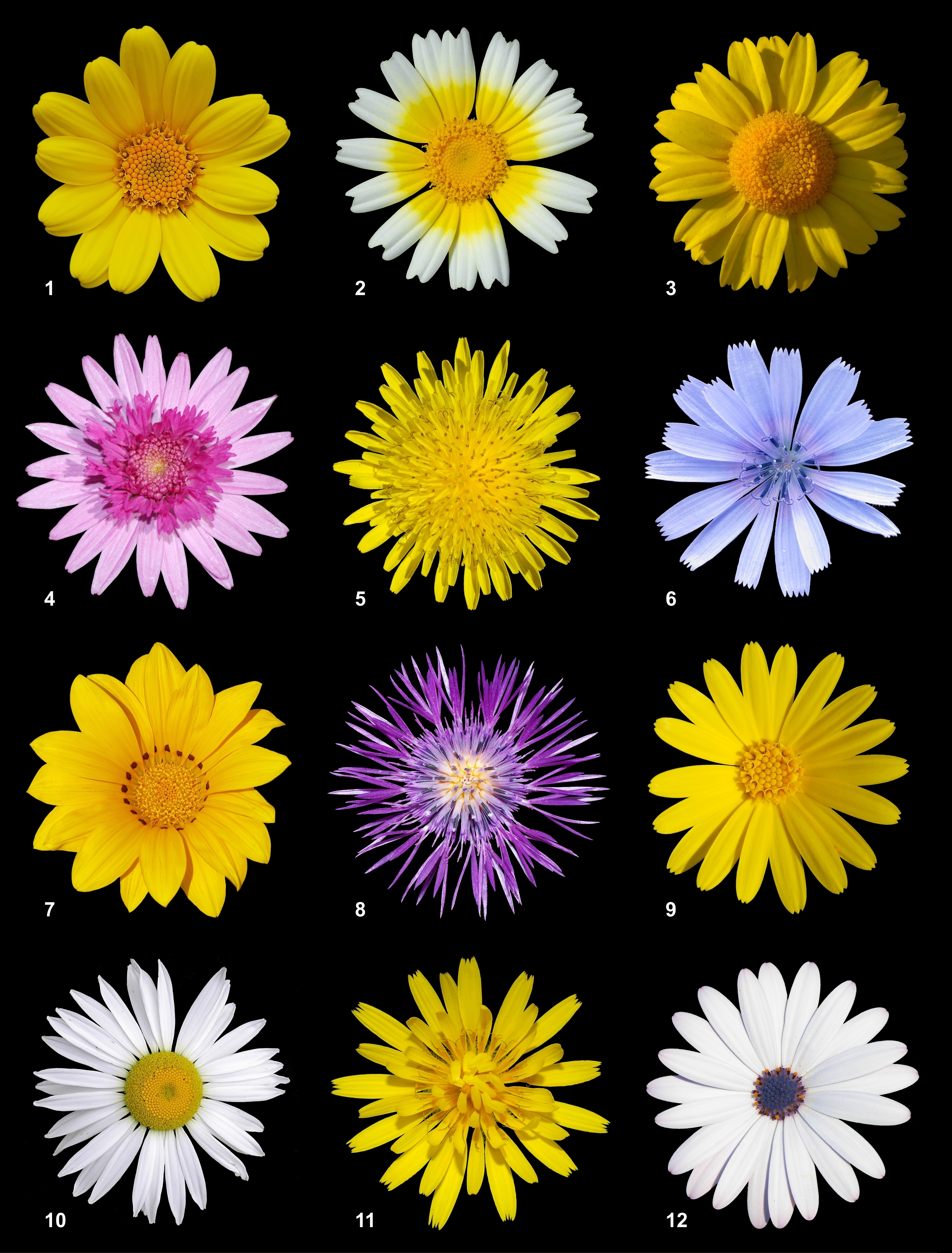
Twelve species of Asteraceae

As of October 2025, Plants of the World Online listed 1,716 accepted genera in the family Asteraceae. Those genera are listed with their author citations. Taxonomic synonyms are not included.

== A ==
List of genera is from Plants of the World Online as of June 2025 unless otherwise cited.

- Abrotanella Cass.
- Acamptopappus A.Gray – goldenhead
- Acanthocephalus Kar. & Kir.
- Acanthocladium F.Muell.
- Acanthodesmos C.D.Adams & duQuesnay
- Acanthospermum Schrank – starburr
- Acanthostyles R.M.King & H.Rob.
- Achillea L. – yarrow
- Achnophora F.Muell.
- Achnopogon Maguire, Steyerm. & Wurdack
- Achyrachaena Schauer – blow wives
- Achyranthemum N.G.Bergh
- Achyrocline (Less.) DC.
- Achyropappus Kunth
- Acilepidopsis H.Rob.
- Acilepis D.Don
- Acmella Rich. ex Pers.
- Acomis F.Muell.
- Acourtia D.Don – desert peony
- Acrisione B.Nord.
- Acritopappus R.M.King & H.Rob.
- Actinobole Endl.
- Acunniana Orchard
- Adeia G.L.Nesom
- Adelostigma Steetz
- Adenanthellum B.Nord.
- Adenocaulon Hook. – trailplant
- Adenocritonia R.M.King & H.Rob.
- Adenoglossa B.Nord.
- Adenoon Dalzell
- Adenophyllum Pers. – dogweed
- Adenostemma J.R.Forst. & G.Forst. – medicineplant
- Adenostyles Cass.
- Adenothamnus D.D.Keck
- Adiaphila G.L.Nesom
- Aedesia O.Hoffm.
- Aequatorium B.Nord
- Aetheolaena Cass.
- Aetheorhiza Cass. – synonym of Sonchus
- Afroaster J.C.Manning & Goldblatt
- Afrocarduus (Kazmi) N.Garcia, Moreyra & Susanna
- Afrocirsium Calleja, N.Garcia, Moreyra & Susanna
- Ageratella A.Gray ex S.Watson
- Ageratina Spach – snakeroot
- Ageratinastrum Mattf.
- Ageratum L. – whiteweed
- Agnorhiza (Jeps.) W.A.Weber
- Agoseris Raf. – mountain dandelion
- Agrianthus Mart. ex DC.
- Ainsliaea DC.
- Ajania Poljakov
- Ajaniopsis C.Shih
- Alatoseta Compton
- Albertinia Spreng.
- Aldama La Llave
- Alepidocline S.F.Blake
- Alfredia Cass.
- Aliella Qaiser & Lack
- Allagopappus Cass.
- Allardia Decne.
- Allittia P.S.Short
- Allocephalus Bringel, J.N.Nakaj. & H.Rob.
- Alloispermum Willd.
- Allopterigeron Dunlop
- Almutaster Á.Löve & D.Löve – alkali marsh aster
- Alomia Kunth
- Alomiella R.M.King & H.Rob.
- Amauria Benth.
- Ambassa Steetz
- Amberboa (Pers.) Less.
- Amblyolepis DC.
- Amblyopappus Hook. & Arn.
- Amblysperma Benth.
- Amboroa Cabrera
- Ambrosia L. – bursage, ragweed
- Ameghinoa Speg.
- Amellus L.
- Ammobium R.Br.
- Amolinia R.M.King & H.Rob.
- Ampelaster G.L.Nesom – climbing aster
- Amphiachyris (DC.) Nutt. – broomweed
- Amphiglossa DC.
- Amphipappus Torr. & A.Gray – chaffbush
- Amphoricarpos Vis.
- Anacantha (Iljin) Soják
- Anacis Schrank
- Anacyclus L.
- Ananthura H.Rob. & Skvarla
- Anaphalioides (Benth. & Hook.f.) Kirp.
- Anaphalis DC. – pearly everlasting
- Anastraphia D.Don
- Anaxeton Gaertn.
- Ancathia DC.
- Ancistrocarphus A.Gray
- Anderbergia B.Nord.
- Andicolea Mayta & Molinari
- Andryala L.
- Anemocarpa Paul G.Wilson
- Angeldiazia M.O.Dillon & Zapata
- Angianthus J.C.Wendl.
- Anisocarpus Nutt.
- Anisochaeta DC.
- Anisocoma Torr. & A.Gray
- Anisopappus Hook. & Arn.
- Antennaria Gaertn. – pussytoes
- Anteremanthus H.Rob.
- × Anthematricaria Asch. (Anthemis × Matricaria)
- Anthemis L. – Roman chamomile
- × Anthepleurospermum Rothm. (Anthemis × Tripleurospermum)
- Anticona E.Linares, J.Campos & A.Galán
- Antillanthus B.Nord.
- Antillia R.M.King & H.Rob.
- Antiphiona Merxm.
- Anvillea DC.
- Apalochlamys Cass.
- Aphanactis Wedd.
- Aphanostephus DC. – doze daisy
- Aphelexis D.Don
- Aphyllocladus Wedd.
- Apodocephala Baker
- Apopyros G.L.Nesom
- Aposeris Neck.
- Apostates Lander
- Apowollastonia Orchard
- Aquilula G.L.Nesom
- Arbelaezaster Cuatrec.
- Archanthemis Lo Presti & Oberpr.
- Archibaccharis Heering
- Archidasyphyllum (Cabrera) P.L.Ferreira, Saavedra & Groppo
- Archiserratula L.Martins
- Arctium L. – burdock
- Arctogeron DC.
- Arctotheca J.C.Wendl. – capeweed
- Arctotis L.
- Argentipallium Paul G.Wilson
- Argyranthemum Webb – dill daisy
- × Argyrautia Sherff (Argyroxiphium × Dubautia)
- Argyroglottis Turcz.
- Argyrotegium J.M.Ward & Breitw.
- Argyroxiphium DC. – silversword
- Aristeguietia R.M.King & H.Rob.
- Arnaldoa Cabrera
- Arnica L. – arnica
- Arnicastrum Greenm.
- Arnoglossum Raf. – Indian plantain
- Arnoseris Gaertn.
- Arrhenechthites Mattf.
- Arrojadocharis Mattf.
- Arrowsmithia DC.
- Artemisia L. – tarragon, sagebrush, sagewort, wormwood, mugwort
- Artemisiopsis S.Moore
- Asanthus R.M.King & H.Rob. – brickellbush
- Ascidiogyne Cuatrec.
- Askellia W.A.Weber
- Aspilia Thouars
- Asplundianthus R.M.King & H.Rob.
- Astartoseris N.Kilian, Hand, Hadjik., Christodoulou & Bou Dagh.
- Aster L. – aster
- Asteridea Lindl.
- Asteriscus Mill.
- Asterothamnus Novopokr.
- × Asterron Olshanskyi (Aster × Erigeron)
- Astranthium Nutt. – western daisy
- Athanasia L.
- Athrixia Ker Gawl.
- Athroisma DC.
- Atractylis L.
- Atractylodes DC.
- Atrichantha Hilliard & B.L.Burtt
- Atrichoseris A.Gray
- Austrobrickellia R.M.King & H.Rob.
- Austrocritonia R.M.King & H.Rob.
- Austroeupatorium R.M.King & H.Rob.
- Austroflourensia J.C.Ospina & S.E.Freire
- Austroliabum H.Rob. & Brettell
- Austrosynotis C.Jeffrey
- Avellara Blanca & C.Díaz
- Axiniphyllum Benth.
- Ayapana Spach
- Ayapanopsis R.M.King & H.Rob.
- Aynia H.Rob.
- Aytacia Yıld.
- Aztecaster G.L.Nesom

== B ==
List of genera is from Plants of the World Online as of June 2025 unless otherwise cited.

- Baccharis L. – baccharis
- Baccharoides Moench
- Baculellum L.V.Ozerova & A.C.Timonin
- × Bacurio Gideon F.Sm. & Figueiredo (Baculellum × Curio)
- Badilloa R.M.King & H.Rob.
- Baeriopsis J.T.Howell
- Bahianthus R.M.King & H.Rob.
- Bahiopsis Kellogg
- Baileya Harv. & A.Gray – desert marigold
- Bajacalia Loockerman, B.L.Turner & R.K.Jansen
- Balduina Nutt. – honeycombhead
- Balladonia P.S.Short
- Balsamorhiza Hook. – balsamroot
- Baltimora L. – baltimora
- Barkleyanthus H.Rob. & Brettell – willow ragwort
- Barnadesia Mutis ex L.f.
- Barrosoa R.M.King & H.Rob.
- Bartlettia A.Gray
- Bartlettina R.M.King & H.Rob.
- Basedowia E.Pritz.
- Bathysanthus G.L.Nesom
- Batopilasia G.L.Nesom & R.D.Noyes
- Bebbia Greene – sweetbush
- Bechium DC.
- Bedfordia DC.
- Bejaranoa R.M.King & H.Rob.
- Bellida Ewart
- Bellis L. – daisy
- Bellium L.
- Belloa J.Rémy
- Benitoa D.D.Keck
- Berardia Vill.
- Berkheya Ehrh.
- Berkheyopsis O.Hoffm.
- Berlandiera DC. – greeneyes
- Berroa Beauverd
- Bertilia Cron
- Berylsimpsonia B.L.Turner
- Bethencourtia Choisy
- Bidens L. – beggartick, sticktight, Spanish needles
- Bigelowia DC. – rayless goldenrod
- Bishopanthus H.Rob.
- Bishopiella R.M.King & H.Rob.
- Bishovia R.M.King & H.Rob.
- Blainvillea Cass.
- Blakiella Cuatrec.
- Blanchetia DC.
- Blennosperma Less. – stickyseed
- Blennospora A.Gray
- Blepharipappus Hook.
- Blepharispermum DC.
- Blepharizonia (A.Gray) Greene
- Blumea DC. – false oxtongue
- Boeberastrum Rydb.
- Boeberoides (DC.) Strother
- Bolandia Cron
- Bolanosa A.Gray
- Boltonia L'Hér. – doll's daisy
- Bombycilaena (DC.) Smoljan.
- Borrichia Adans. – seaside tansy
- Bothriocline Oliv. ex Benth.
- Brachanthemum DC.
- Brachionostylum Mattf.
- Brachyclados D.Don
- Brachyglottis J.R.Forst. & G.Forst.
- Brachylaena R.Br.
- Brachyscome Cass.
- Brachythrix Wild & G.V.Pope
- Bradburia Torr. & A.Gray
- Brenandendron H.Rob.
- Brickellia Elliott – brickellbush
- Brickelliastrum R.M.King & H.Rob. – brickellbush
- Brintonia Greene – mock goldenrod
- Brocchia Vis.
- Buphthalmum L.
- Burkartia Crisci
- Burnellia Mesfin & D.J.Crawford

== C ==
List of genera is from Plants of the World Online as of June 2025 unless otherwise cited.

- Caatinganthus H.Rob.
- Cabobanthus H.Rob.
- Cabreraea Bonif.
- Cabreriella Cuatrec.
- Cacaliopsis A.Gray
- Cacosmia Kunth
- Cadiscus E.Mey. ex DC.
- Caesulia Roxb.
- Calanticaria (B.L.Rob. & Greenm.) E.E.Schill. & Panero
- Calea L.
- Calendula L. – marigold
- Callicephalus C.A.Mey.
- Callilepis DC.
- Callistephus Cass.
- Calocephalus R.Br.
- Calomeria Vent.
- Calorezia Panero
- Calostephane Benth.
- Calotesta P.O.Karis
- Calotis R.Br.
- Calycadenia DC. – western rosinweed
- Calycoseris A.Gray – tackstem
- Calyptocarpus Less.
- Camchaya Gagnep.
- Campovassouria R.M.King & H.Rob.
- Camptacra N.T.Burb.
- Campuloclinium DC.
- Canadanthus G.L.Nesom – mountain aster
- Cancrinia Kar. & Kir.
- Cancriniella Tzvelev
- Capelio B.Nord.
- Caputia B.Nord. & Pelser
- Cardopatium Juss.
- Carduncellus Adans.
- Carduus L. – plumeless thistle
- Carlina L. – carline thistle
- Carlquistia B.G.Baldwin
- Carminatia Moc. ex DC.
- Carpesium L.
- Carphephorus Cass. – chaffhead
- Carphochaete A.Gray – bristlehead
- Carthamus L. – distaff thistle
- Cassinia R.Br.
- Castanedia R.M.King & H.Rob.
- Castrilanthemum Vogt & Oberpr.
- Castroviejoa Galbany, L.Sáez & Benedí
- Catamixis Thomson
- Catananche L.
- Catatia Humbert
- Catolesia D.J.N.Hind
- Caucasalia B.Nord.
- Caucasoseris M.Güzel, N.Kilian, Sennikov & Coșkunç.
- Cavalcantia R.M.King & H.Rob.
- Cavea W.W.Sm. & J.Small
- Caxamarca M.O.Dillon & Sagást.
- Celmisia Cass.
- Centaurea L. – knapweed, cornflower, star thistle
- Centaurodendron Johow
- Centauropsis Bojer ex DC.
- Centaurothamnus Wagenitz & Dittrich
- Centenaria P.Gonzáles, A.Cano & H.Rob.
- Centipeda Lour.
- Centratherum Cass.
- Centromadia Greene
- Centropappus Hook.f.
- Cephalipterum A.Gray
- Cephalopappus Nees & Mart.
- Cephalosorus A.Gray
- Ceratogyne Turcz.
- Ceruana Forssk.
- Chacoa R.M.King & H.Rob.
- Chaenactis DC. – pincushion
- Chaetacalia Pruski
- Chaetadelpha A.Gray ex S.Watson – skeletonweed
- Chaetanthera Ruiz & Pav.
- Chaetopappa DC. – least daisy
- Chaetymenia Hook. & Arn.
- Chamaechaenactis Rydb.
- Chamaegeron Schrenk.
- Chamaeleon Cass.
- Chamaemelum Mill. - dogfennel
- Chamaepus Wagenitz
- Chaochienchangia G.L.Nesom
- Chaptalia Vent. – sunbonnetts
- Charadranaetes Janovec & H.Rob.
- Chardinia Desf.
- Cheirolophus Cass.
- Chersodoma Phil.
- Chevreulia Cass.
- Chiliadenus Cass.
- Chiliocephalum Benth.
- Chiliophyllum Phil.
- Chiliotrichiopsis Cabrera
- Chiliotrichum Cass.
- Chimantaea Maguire, Steyerm. & Wurdack
- Chionolaena DC.
- Chionopappus Benth.
- Chlamydophora Ehrenb. ex Less.
- Chloracantha G.L.Nesom, Y.B.Suh, D.R.Morgan, S.D.Sundb. & B.B.S
- Chondrilla L.
- Chondropyxis D.A.Cooke
- Chresta Vell. ex DC.
- Chromolaena DC. - thoroughwort
- Chromolepis Benth.
- Chronopappus DC.
- Chrysactinia A.Gray
- Chrysactinium Wedd.
- Chrysanthellum Rich.
- Chrysanthemum L.
- Chrysanthoglossum B.H.Wilcox, K.Bremer & Humphries
- Chryselium Urtubey & S.E.Freire
- Chrysocephalum Walp.
- Chrysocoma L.
- Chrysogonum L.
- Chrysolaena H.Rob.
- Chrysoma Nutt.
- Chrysophthalmum Sch.Bip. ex Walp.
- Chrysopsis (Nutt.) Elliott – goldenaster
- Chrysothamnus Nutt. – rabbitbrush
- Chthonocephalus Steetz
- Chucoa Cabrera
- Chuquiraga Juss.
- Cicerbita Wallr.
- Ciceronia Urb.
- Cichorium L. – chicory
- Cineraria L.
- × Cirsiocarduus P.Fourn. (Carduus × Cirsium)
- Cirsium Mill. – thistle
- Cissampelopsis Miq.
- Cladanthus Cass.
- Cladochaeta DC.
- Clappia A.Gray – clapdaisy
- Clibadium F.Allam. ex L.
- Cloiselia S.Moore
- Cnicothamnus Griseb.
- Coleocoma F.Muell.
- Coleostephus Cass.
- Colobanthera Humbert
- Cololobus H.Rob.
- Columbiadoria G.L.Nesom
- Comaclinium Scheidw. & Planch.
- Commidendrum Burch. ex DC.
- Condylidium R.M.King & H.Rob.
- Condylopodium R.M.King & H.Rob.
- Conocliniopsis R.M.King & H.Rob.
- Conoclinium DC.
- Constancea B.G.Baldwin
- Cordiofontis G.L.Nesom
- Coreocarpus Benth.
- Coreopsis L. – tickseed
- Corethamnium R.M.King & H.Rob.
- Corethrogyne DC. – sandaster
- Coronidium Paul G.Wilson
- Corymbium Gronov.
- Cosmos Cav.
- Cota J.Gay
- × Cotanthemis Holub (Anthemis × Cota)
- Cotula L. – waterbuttons
- Coulterella Vasey & Rose
- Cousinia Cass.
- Cousiniopsis Nevski
- Craspedia G.Forst.
- Crassocephalum Moench – ragleaf
- Crassothonna B.Nord.
- Cratystylis S.Moore
- Cremanthodium Benth.
- Cremnothamnus Puttock
- × Crepihieracium P.Fourn. (Crepis × Hieracium)
- Crepidiastrum Nakai
- Crepis L. – hawksbeard
- Criscia Katinas
- Criscianthus Grossi & J.N.Nakaj.
- Critonia P.Browne – thoroughwort
- Critoniadelphus R.M.King & H.Rob.
- Critoniella R.M.King & H.Rob.
- Critoniopsis Sch.Bip.
- Crocidium Hook. – spring-gold
- Crocodilium Hill
- Cronquistianthus R.M.King & H.Rob.
- Croptilon Raf. – scratchdaisy
- Crossostephium Less.
- Crossothamnus R.M.King & H.Rob.
- Crupina (Pers.) DC.
- Crystallopollen Steetz
- Cuatrecasanthus H.Rob.
- Cuatrecasasiella H.Rob.
- Cuchumatanea Seid. & Beaman
- Culcitium Bonpl.
- Cullumia R.Br.
- Cuniculotinus Urbatsch, R.P.Roberts & Neubig
- Curio P.V.Heath
- Cuspidia Gaertn.
- Cyanthillium Blume
- Cyathocline Cass. – synonym of Blumea DC.
- Cyathomone S.F.Blake
- Cyclachaena Fresen. – synonym of Euphrosyne DC.
- Cyclolepis Gillies ex D.Don
- Cylindrocline Cass.
- Cymbonotus Cass.
- Cymbopappus B.Nord.
- Cymophora B.L.Rob.
- Cynara L. – artichoke
- Cyrtocymura H.Rob.

== D ==
List of genera is from Plants of the World Online as of June 2025 unless otherwise cited.

- Dacryotrichia Wild
- Dahlia Cav.
- Damnamenia Given
- Damnxanthodium Strother
- Dasyandantha H.Rob.
- Dasyanthina H.Rob.
- Dasycondylus R.M.King & H.Rob.
- Dasyphyllum Kunth
- Dauresia B.Nord. & Pelser
- Daveaua Willk. ex Mariz
- Davilanthus E.E.Schill. & Panero
- Decachaeta DC.
- Decaneuropsis H.Rob. & Skvarla
- Decastylocarpus Humbert
- Decazesia F.Muell.
- Deinandra Greene
- Delairea Lem. – capeivy
- Delamerea S.Moore
- Delilia Spreng.
- Delwiensia W.A.Weber & R.C.Wittmann
- Dendrocacalia (Nakai) Nakai
- Dendrophorbium (Cuatrec.) C.Jeffrey
- Dendrosenecio (Hauman ex Humbert) B.Nord.
- Dendroviguiera E.E.Schill. & Panero
- Denekia Thunb.
- Desmanthodium Benth.
- Dewildemania O.Hoffm.
- Diacranthera R.M.King & H.Rob.
- Diaperia Nutt.
- Diaphractanthus Humbert
- Dicercoclados C.Jeffrey & Y.L.Chen
- Dicerothamnus Koek.
- Dichaetophora A.Gray
- Dichrocephala L'Hér. ex DC.
- Dichromochlamys Dunlop
- Dicoma Cass.
- Dicomopsis S.Ortiz
- Dicoria Torr. & A.Gray – twinbugs
- Dicranocarpus A.Gray
- Didelta L'Hér.
- Dielitzia P.S.Short
- Dieteria Nutt.
- Digitacalia Pippen
- Dillandia V.A.Funk & H.Rob.
- Dimeresia A.Gray
- Dimerostemma Cass.
- Dimorphocoma F.Muell. & Tate
- Dimorphotheca Moench – cape marigold
- Diodontium F.Muell.
- Diplostephium Kunth
- Dipterocome Fisch. & C.A.Mey.
- Dipterocypsela S.F.Blake
- Disparago Gaertn.
- Dissothrix A.Gray
- Distephanus Cass.
- Disynaphia DC.
- Dithyrostegia A.Gray
- Dittrichia Greuter
- Doellingeria Nees – whitetop
- Dolichlasium Lag.
- Dolichoglottis B.Nord.
- Dolichorrhiza (Pojark.) Galushko
- Dolichothrix Hilliard & B.L.Burtt
- Dolomiaea DC.
- Doniophyton Wedd.
- Dorobaea Cass.
- Doronicum L. – false leopardbane
- Dresslerothamnus H.Rob.
- Dubautia Gaudich.
- Dubyaea DC.
- Dugesia A.Gray
- Duhaldea DC.
- Duidaea S.F.Blake
- Duseniella K.Schum.
- Dymondia Compton
- Dysaster H.Rob. & V.A.Funk – synonym of Diplostephium Kunth
- Dyscritothamnus B.L.Rob.
- Dysodiopsis Rydb. – dogfennel
- Dyssodia Cav. – dogweed

== E ==
List of genera is from Plants of the World Online as of June 2025 unless otherwise cited.

- Eastwoodia Brandegee
- Eatonella A.Gray
- Echinacea Moench – coneflower
- Echinocoryne H.Rob.
- Echinops L. – globethistle
- Eclipta L.
- Edmondia Cass.
- Egletes Cass. – tropic daisy
- Eirmocephala H.Rob.
- Eitenia R.M.King & H.Rob.
- Ekmania Gleason
- Ekmaniopappus Borhidi
- Elachanthemum Y.Ling & Y.R.Ling
- Elachanthus F.Muell.
- Elaphandra Strother
- Electranthera Mesfin, D.J.Crawford & Pruski
- Elekmania B.Nord.
- Elephantopus L. – elephantsfoot
- Eleutheranthera Poit.
- Ellenbergia Cuatrec.
- Elytropappus Cass.
- Emilia Cass. – tasselflower
- Encelia Adans. – brittlebush
- Enceliopsis (A.Gray) A.Nelson – sunray
- Endocellion Turcz. ex Herder
- Endopappus Sch.Bip.
- Engelmannia Torr. & A.Gray – Engelmann's daisy
- Engleria O.Hoffm.
- Enydra Lour. – swampwort
- Epaltes Cass.
- Ephedrides G.L.Nesom
- Epilasia (Bunge) Benth. & Hook.f.
- Epilepis Benth.
- Epitrachys (DC. ex Duby) K.Koch – synonym of Cirsium Mill.
- Epitriche Turcz.
- Erato DC.
- Erechtites Raf. – burnweed
- Eremanthus Less.
- Eremosis (DC.) Gleason
- Eremothamnus O.Hoffm.
- Eriachaenium Sch.Bip.
- Ericameria Nutt. – goldenbush, heath goldenrod
- Ericentrodea S.F.Blake & Sherff
- Erigeron L. – daisy, fleabane
- Eriocephalus L.
- Eriochlamys Sond. & F.Muell.
- Eriophyllum Lag. – woolly sunflower
- Eriothrix Cass.
- Erlangea Sch.Bip.
- Erodiophyllum F.Muell.
- Erymophyllum Paul G.Wilson
- Erythrocephalum Benth.
- Erythroseris N.Kilian & Gemeinholzer
- Eschenbachia Moench
- Espejoa DC.
- Espeletia Bonpl. – frailejón
- Ethulia L.f.
- Euchiton Cass. – cudweed
- Eumorphia DC.
- Eupatoriastrum Greenm.
- Eupatorina R.M.King & H.Rob.
- Eupatoriopsis Hieron.
- Eupatorium L. – thoroughwort, snakeweed
- Euphrosyne DC.
- Eurybia (Cass.) Cass.
- Eurydochus Maguire & Wurdack
- Euryops (Cass.) Cass.
- Eutetras A.Gray
- Euthamia (Nutt.) Cass. – goldentop
- Eutrochium Raf. – Joe-Pye weed
- Ewartia Beauverd
- Ewartiothamnus Anderb.
- Exomiocarpon Lawalrée
- Exostigma G.Sancho

== F ==
List of genera is from Plants of the World Online as of June 2025 unless otherwise cited.

- Faberia Hemsl. ex F.B.Forbes & Hemsl.
- Facelis Cass. – trampweed
- Famatinanthus Ariza & S.E.Freire
- Farfugium Lindl.
- Faujasia Cass.
- Faujasiopsis C.Jeffrey
- Faxonia Brandegee
- Feddea Urb.
- Feldstonia P.S.Short
- Felicia Cass.
- Femeniasia Susanna
- Fenixia Merr.
- Ferreyranthus H.Rob. & Brettell
- Ferreyrella S.F.Blake
- Filago Loefl. – cottonrose
- Filifolium Kitam. – synonym of Artemisia L.
- Fitchia Hook.f.
- Fitzwillia P.S.Short
- Flaveria Juss. – yellowtops
- Fleischmannia Sch.Bip. – thoroughwort
- Fleischmanniopsis R.M.King & H.Rob.
- Florestina Cass.
- Floscaldasia Cuatrec.
- Flosmutisia Cuatrec.
- Flourensia DC. – tarwort
- Fluminaria N.G.Bergh
- Flyriella R.M.King & H.Rob. – brickellbush
- Formania W.W.Sm. & Small
- Foveolina Källersjö
- Freya V.M.Badillo
- Fulcaldea Poir.

== G ==
List of genera is from Plants of the World Online as of June 2025 unless otherwise cited.

- Gaillardia Foug. – blanketflower
- Galactites Moench
- Galatella Cass.
- Galeana La Llave
- Galeomma Rauschert
- Galgera Anderb. & Bengtson
- Galinsoga Ruiz & Pav. – gallant-soldier
- Galinsogeopsis Sch.Bip.
- Gamochaeta Wedd. – everlasting
- Garberia A.Gray
- Garcibarrigoa Cuatrec.
- Gardnerina R.M.King & H.Rob.
- Garhadiolus Jaub. & Spach
- Garuleum Cass.
- Gazania Gaertn.
- Geigeria Griess.
- Geissolepis B.L.Rob.
- Gelasia Cass.
- Geraea Torr. & A.Gray – desert sunflower
- Gerbera L. – Gerbera or Transvaal daisy
- Geropogon L.
- Gibbaria Cass.
- Gilberta Turcz.
- Gilruthia Ewart
- Gladiopappus Humbert
- × Glebianthemum J.M.Watson & A.R.Flores (Argyranthemum × Glebionis)
- Glebionis Cass.
- Glossarion Maguire & Wurdack
- Glossocardia Cass.
- Glossopappus Kunze
- Glyptopleura D.C.Eaton
- Gnaphaliothamnus Kirp.
- Gnaphalium L. – cudweed
- Gnephosis Cass.
- Gnomophalium Greuter
- Gochnatia Kunth
- Goldmanella Greenm.
- Gongrostylus R.M.King & H.Rob.
- Gongylolepis Schomb.
- Goniocaulon Cass.
- Gonospermum Less.
- Gonzalezia E.E.Schill. & Panero
- Gorceixia Baker
- Gorteria L.
- Gossweilera S.Moore
- Goyazianthus R.M.King & H.Rob.
- Grangea Adans.
- Grangeopsis Humbert
- Graphistylis B.Nord.
- Gratwickia F.Muell.
- Grauanthus Fayed
- Grazielia R.M.King & H.Rob.
- Greenmaniella W.M.Sharp
- Grindelia Willd. – gumweed
- Grisebachianthus R.M.King & H.Rob.
- Grosvenoria R.M.King & H.Rob.
- Guardiola Cerv. ex Bonpl.
- Guayania R.M.King & H.Rob.
- Guevaria R.M.King & H.Rob.
- Guizotia Cass.
- Gundelia L.
- Gundlachia A.Gray
- Gutenbergia Sch.Bip.
- Gutierrezia Lag. – snakeweed
- Guynesomia Bonif. & G.Sancho
- Gymnanthemum Cass.
- Gymnarrhena Desf.
- Gymnocondylus R.M.King & H.Rob.
- Gymnocoronis DC.
- Gymnodiscus Less.
- Gymnolaena Rydb.
- Gymnopentzia Benth.
- Gymnosperma Less.
- Gynoxys Cass.
- Gynura Cass.
- Gypothamnium Phil.
- Gyptidium R.M.King & H.Rob.
- Gyptis Cass.
- Gyrodoma Wild

== H ==
List of genera is from Plants of the World Online as of June 2025 unless otherwise cited.

- Haastia Hook.f.
- Haeckeria F.Muell.
- Haegiela P.S.Short & Paul G.Wilson
- Hainanecio Ying Liu & Q.E.Yang
- Handelia Heimerl
- Haplocarpha Less. – onefruit
- Haploesthes A.Gray – false broomweed
- Haplopappus Cass.
- Haplosticha Phil.
- Haptotrichion Paul G.Wilson
- Harleya S.F.Blake
- Harmonia B.G.Baldwin
- Harnackia Urb.
- Haroldia Bonif.
- Hartwrightia A.Gray
- Hasteola Raf. – false Indian plantain
- Hatschbachiella R.M.King & H.Rob.
- Hazardia Greene – bristleweed
- Hebeclinium DC. – thoroughwort
- Hecastocleis A.Gray
- Hedosyne Strother
- Hedypnois Mill.
- Heiseria E.E.Schill. & Panero
- Helenium L. – sneezeweed
- Helianthella Torr. & A.Gray
- Helianthus L. – sunflowers
- Helichrysopsis Kirp.
- Helichrysum Mill. – strawflower, everlasting
- Heliocauta Humphries
- Heliomeris Nutt. – false goldeneye
- Heliopsis Pers.
- Helminthotheca Zinn
- Helodeaster G.L.Nesom
- Helogyne Nutt.
- Hemizonella A.Gray
- Hemizonia DC. – tarweed
- Henricksonia B.L.Turner
- Heptanthus Griseb.
- Herderia Cass.
- Herodotia Urb. & Ekman
- Herreranthus B.Nord.
- Hertia Less.
- Hesperevax A.Gray – dwarf-cudweed
- Hesperomannia A.Gray – island-aster
- Heteracia Fisch. & C.A.Mey.
- Heteranthemis Schott – oxeye
- Heterocoma DC.
- Heterocondylus R.M.King & H.Rob.
- Heterocypsela H.Rob.
- Heteroderis Boiss.
- Heterolepis Cass.
- Heteromera Pomel
- Heteromma Benth.
- Heteroplexis C.C.Chang
- Heterorhachis Sch.Bip. ex Walp.
- Heterosperma Cav.
- Heterotheca Cass. – goldenasters, camphorweed, telegraph weed
- Hidalgoa La Llave
- Hieracium L. – hawkweed
- Hilliardia B.Nord.
- Hilliardiella H.Rob.
- Hinterhubera Sch.Bip. ex Wedd.
- Hippia L.
- Hippolytia Poljakov
- Hirtellina Cass.
- Hispidella Barnadez ex Lam.
- Hoehnephytum Cabrera
- Hoffmannanthus H.Rob., S.C.Keeley & Skvarla
- Hoffmanniella Schltr. ex Lawalrée
- Hofmeisteria Walp.
- Holocarpha Greene – tarweed
- Holocheilus Cass.
- Hololeion Kitam.
- Hololepis DC.
- Holoschkuhria H.Rob.
- Holozonia Greene
- Homogyne Cass.
- Hoplophyllum DC.
- Huarpea Cabrera
- Huberopappus Pruski
- Hubertia Bory
- Hughesia R.M.King & H.Rob.
- Hullsia P.S.Short
- Hulsea Torr. & A.Gray – alpinegold
- Humbertacalia C.Jeffrey
- Humeocline Anderb.
- Hyalis D.Don ex Hook. & Arn.
- Hyalochlamys A.Gray
- Hyaloseris Griseb.
- Hyalosperma Steetz
- Hybridella Cass.
- Hydroidea P.O.Karis
- Hydropectis Rydb.
- Hymenocephalus Jaub. & Spach
- Hymenolepis Cass.
- Hymenonema Cass.
- Hymenopappus L'Her.
- Hymenostemma Kunze ex Willk.
- Hymenostephium Benth.
- Hymenothrix A.Gray – thimblehead
- Hymenoxys Cass. – rubberweed
- Hyoseris L.
- Hypericophyllum Steetz
- Hypochaeris L. – catsear
- Hypserion G.L.Nesom
- Hysterionica Willd.
- Hystrichophora Mattf.

== I ==
List of genera is from Plants of the World Online as of June 2025 unless otherwise cited.

- Ianthopappus Roque & D.J.N.Hind
- Ichthyothere Mart.
- Idiopappus H.Rob. & Panero
- Idiothamnus R.M.King & H.Rob.
- Ifloga Cass.
- Ignurbia B.Nord.
- Iltisia S.F.Blake
- Imeria R.M.King & H.Rob.
- Indocypraea Orchard
- Inezia E.Phillips
- Inkaliabum D.G.Gut.
- Inula L. – yellowhead
- Inulanthera Källersjö
- Inulopsis O.Hoffm.
- Io B.Nord.
- Iocenes B.Nord.
- Iodocephalopsis Bunwong & H.Rob.
- Iogeton Strother
- Ionactis Greene – stiff-leaved asters
- Iostephane Benth.
- Iotasperma G.L.Nesom
- Iphiona Cass.
- Iphionopsis Anderb.
- Iranecio B.Nord.
- Iranoaster Kaz.Osaloo, Farhani & Mozaff.
- Ischnea F.Muell.
- Ismelia Cass.
- Isocarpha Less. – pearlhead
- Isocoma Nutt. – goldenbush, jimmyweed
- Isoetopsis Turcz. – synonym of Minuria DC.
- Isostigma Less.
- Iva L. – marshelder, sumpweed
- Ixeridium (A.Gray) Tzvelev
- Ixeris (Cass.) Cass.
- Ixiochlamys F.Muell. & Sond.
- Ixiolaena Benth.
- Ixodia R.Br.
- × Ixyoungia Kitam. (Ixeris × Youngia)

== J ==
List of genera is from Plants of the World Online as of June 2025 unless otherwise cited.

- Jacmaia B.Nord.
- Jacobaea Mill.
- Jaegeria Kunth
- Jalantzia D.J.N.Hind
- Jalcophila M.O.Dillon & Sagást.
- Jaliscoa S.Watson
- Jamesianthus S.F.Blake & Sherff
- Japonicalia C.Ren & Q.E.Yang
- Jaramilloa R.M.King & H.Rob.
- Jasonia Cass.
- Jaumea Pers.
- Jefea Strother
- Jeffreya Cabrera
- Jeffreycia H.Rob., S.C.Keeley & Skvarla
- Jensia B.G.Baldwin
- Jessea H.Rob. & Cuatrec.
- Joseanthus H.Rob.
- Jungia L.f.
- Jurinea Cass.

== K ==
List of genera is from Plants of the World Online as of June 2025 unless otherwise cited.

- Karelinia Less.
- Karvandarina Rech.f.
- Kaschgaria Poljakov – synonym of Artemisia L.
- Katinasia Bonif.
- Kaunia R.M.King & H.Rob.
- Kazbegia Uysal & Hamzaoğlu
- Kemulariella Tamamsch.
- Keysseria Lauterb.
- Khasianthus H.Rob. & Skvarla
- Kieslingia Faúndez, Saldivia & A.E.Martic.
- Kinghamia C.Jeffrey
- Kingianthus H.Rob.
- Kippistia F.Muell.
- Klasea Cass.
- Kleinia Mill.
- Koanophyllon Arruda – thoroughwort
- Koehneola Urb.
- Koelpinia Pall.
- Koyamasia H.Rob.
- Krigia Schreb. – dwarf dandelion
- Kurziella H.Rob. & Bunwong
- Kyhosia B.G.Baldwin
- Kyrsteniopsis R.M.King & H.Rob

== L ==
List of genera is from Plants of the World Online as of June 2025 unless otherwise cited.

- Laceanthos Pruski
- Lachanodes DC.
- Lachnophyllum Bunge
- Lachnorhiza A.Rich.
- Lachnospermum Willd.
- Lactuca L. – lettuce
- Laennecia Cass.
- Laestadia Kunth ex Less.
- Lagascea Cav.
- Lagenocypsela Swenson & K.Bremer
- Lagenophora Cass. – island-daisy
- Laggera Sch.Bip. ex Benth.
- Lagophylla Nutt. – hareleaf
- Lagoseriopsis Kirp.
- Lamprocephalus B.Nord.
- Lampropappus (O.Hoffm.) H.Rob.
- Lamyropappus Knorring & Tamamsch.
- Lamyropsis (Kharadze) Dittrich
- Landerolaria G.L.Nesom
- Langebergia Anderb.
- Lantanopsis C.Wright ex Griseb.
- Laphamia A.Gray
- Lapidia Roque & S.C.Ferreira
- Lapsana L. – nipplewort
- Lapsanastrum Pak & K.Bremer
- Lasianthaea DC.
- Lasiocephalus Willd. ex D.F.K.Schltdl.
- Lasiolaena R.M.King & H.Rob.
- Lasiopogon Cass.
- Lasiospermum Lag. – cocoonhead
- Lasthenia Cass. – goldfield
- Launaea Cass. – aulaga
- Lawrencella Lindl.
- Layia Hook. & Arn. ex DC. – tidytips
- Lecocarpus Decne.
- Leibnitzia Cass. – sunbonnets
- Leiboldia Schltdl.
- Leiocarpa Paul G.Wilson
- Lemmatium DC.
- Lemooria P.S.Short
- Leonis B.Nord.
- Leontodon L. – hawkbit
- Leontopodium R.Br. ex Cass. – edelweiss
- × Leontoroides B.Bock (Leontodon × Scorzoneroides)
- Lepidaploa (Cass.) Cass.
- Lepidesmia Klatt
- Lepidolopha C.Winkl.
- Lepidolopsis Poljakov
- Lepidonia S.F.Blake
- Lepidophorum Neck. ex DC.
- Lepidophyllum Cass.
- Lepidospartum A.Gray – broomsage
- Lepidostephium Oliv.
- Leptinella Cass. – brass buttons, creeping cotula
- Leptocarpha DC.
- Leptoclinium Gardner ex Benth. & Hook.f.
- Leptorhynchos Less. – scaly button
- Leptostelma D.Don ex G.Don
- Leptosyne DC.
- Lescaillea Griseb.
- Lessingia Cham. – vinegarweed
- Lessingianthus H.Rob.
- Lettowia H.Rob. & Skvarla
- Leucactinia Rydb.
- × Leucantanacetum Rauschert (Leucanthemum × Tanacetum)
- Leucanthemella Tzvelev
- Leucanthemopsis (Giroux) Heywood
- Leucanthemum Mill. – daisy, oxeye daisy
- Leucheria Lag.
- Leucoblepharis Arn.
- Leucochrysum (DC.) Paul G.Wilson
- Leucogenes Beauverd
- Leucomeris D.Don
- Leucophyta R.Br.
- Leucoptera B.Nord
- × Leucoraoulia Cockayne & Allan (Leucogenes × Raoulia)
- Leucosyris Greene
- Leucozoma T.L.Collins
- Leunisia Phil.
- Leysera L.
- Liabum Adans.
- Liatris Gaertn. ex Schreb. – blazing star, gay feather
- Libinhania N.Kilian, Galbany, Oberpr. & A.G.Mill.
- Lidbeckia P.J.Bergius
- Lifago Schweinf. & Muschl.
- × Ligonicalia Z.H.Feng, Bing Liu & Su Liu (Japonicalia × Ligularia)
- Ligularia Cass.
- Ligulariopsis Y.L.Chen
- Lihengia Y.S.Chen & R.Ke
- Limbarda Adans.
- Lindheimera A.Gray & Engelm.
- Linealia G.L.Nesom
- Linochilus Benth.
- Linzia Sch.Bip. ex Walp.
- Lipoblepharis Orchard
- Lipochaeta DC. – nehe
- Lipotriche R.Br.
- Lipschitzia Zaika, Sukhor. & N.Kilian
- Litogyne Harv.
- Litothamnus R.M.King & H.Rob.
- Llerasia Triana
- Logfia Cass. – cottonrose
- Lomanthus B.Nord. & Pelser
- Lomatozona Baker
- Lonas Adans.
- Lopholaena DC.
- Lophopappus Rusby
- Lorandersonia Urbatsch, R.P.Roberts & Neubig
- Lordhowea B.Nord.
- Lorentzianthus R.M.King & H.Rob.
- Lourteigia R.M.King & H.Rob.
- Loxothysanus B.L.Rob.
- Lucilia Cass.
- Luina Benth. – silverback
- Lulia Zardini
- Lundellianthus H.Rob.
- Lundinia B.Nord.
- Lycapsus Phil. – synonym of Perityle Benth.
- Lychnocephalus Mart. ex DC.
- Lychnophora Mart.
- Lychnophorella Loeuille, Semir & Pirani
- Lycoseris Cass.
- Lygodesmia D.Don – skeleton weed

== M ==
List of genera is from Plants of the World Online as of June 2025 unless otherwise cited.

- Machaeranthera Nees – goldenweed, tansyaster
- Macledium Cass.
- Macrachaenium Hook.f.
- Macrolearia Saldivia
- Macropodina R.M.King & H.Rob.
- Macvaughiella R.M.King & H.Rob.
- Madagaster G.L.Nesom
- Madia Molina – tarweed
- Mairia Nees
- Malacothrix DC. – desert dandelion
- Malmeanthus R.M.King & H.Rob.
- Malperia S.Watson
- Mantisalca Cass.
- Manyonia H.Rob.
- Marasmodes DC.
- Marshallia Schreb. – Barbara's buttons
- Marshalljohnstonia Henrickson
- Marticorenia Crisci
- Maschalostachys Loeuille & Roque
- Matricaria L. – mayweed
- Mattfeldanthus H.Rob. & R.M.King
- Mattfeldia Urb.
- Mauranthemum Vogt & Oberpr.
- Mecomischus Coss. ex Benth. & Hook.f.
- Medranoa Urbatsch & R.P.Roberts
- Melampodium L. – blackfoot
- Melanodendron DC.
- Melanoseris Decne.
- Melanthera Rohr – squarestem
- Merrittia Merr.
- Mesanthophora H.Rob.
- Mesogramma DC.
- Metalasia R.Br.
- Mexerion G.L.Nesom
- Mexianthus B.L.Rob.
- Micractis DC.
- Microcephala Pobed.
- Microglossa DC.
- Microgyne Cass.
- Microliabum Cabrera
- Micropsis DC.
- Micropus L. – cottonseed
- Microseris D.Don – silverpuffs, yam daisy
- Microspermum Lag.
- Mikania Willd. – hempvine
- Mikaniopsis Milne-Redh.
- Milleria Houst. ex L.
- Millotia Cass.
- Minasia H.Rob.
- Minuria DC.
- Miricacalia Kitam.
- Misbrookea V.A.Funk
- Mixtecalia Redonda-Mart., García-Mend. & D.Sandoval
- Mniodes (A.Gray) Benth.
- Mojiangia Ze H.Wang, N.Kilian & H.Peng
- Monactinocephalus Klatt
- Monactis Kunth
- Monarrhenus Cass.
- Monogereion G.M.Barroso & R.M.King
- Monolopia DC.
- Monoptilon Torr. & A.Gray – desertstar
- Monosis DC.
- Montanoa Cerv.
- Monticalia C.Jeffrey
- Moonia Arn.
- Moquinia DC.
- Moquiniastrum (Cabrera) G.Sancho
- Morithamnus R.M.King, H.Rob. & G.M.Barroso
- Moscharia Ruiz & Pav.
- Msuata O.Hoffm.
- Mtonia Beentje
- Muellerolaria G.L.Nesom
- Munnozia Ruiz & Pav.
- Munzothamnus P.H.Raven
- Muschleria S.Moore
- Muscosomorphe J.C.Manning
- Mutisia L.f.
- Myanmaria H.Rob.
- Myopordon Boiss.
- Myriactis Less.
- Myriocephalus Benth.
- Myripnois Bunge
- Myrovernix Koek.
- Myxopappus Källersjö

== N ==
List of genera is from Plants of the World Online as of June 2025 unless otherwise cited.

- Nabalus Cass.
- Nahuatlea V.A.Funk
- Nananthea DC.
- Nannoglottis Maxim.
- Nardophyllum Hook. & Arn.
- Narvalina Cass.
- Nassauvia Comm. ex Juss.
- Neblinaea Maguire & Wurdack
- Neja D.Don
- Nelsonianthus H.Rob. & Brettell
- Nemosenecio (Kitam.) B.Nord.
- Neobrachyactis Brouillet
- Neocabreria R.M.King & H.Rob.
- Neocuatrecasia R.M.King & H.Rob.
- Neojeffreya Cabrera
- Neolaria G.L.Nesom
- Neomirandea R.M.King & H.Rob.
- Neopallasia Poljakov – synonym of Artemisia L.
- Neotysonia Dalla Torre & Harms
- Nesampelos B.Nord.
- Nesomia B.L.Turner
- Nesothamnus Rydb.
- Nestlera Spreng.
- Nestotus R.P.Roberts, Urbatsch & Neubig
- Neurolaena R.Br.
- Neurolakis Mattf.
- Nicolasia S.Moore
- Nicolletia A.Gray – hole-in-the-sand
- Nidorella Cass.
- Nipponanthemum (Kitam.) Kitam.
- Nivellea B.H.Wilcox, K.Bremer & Humphries
- Nolletia Cass.
- Nothobaccharis R.M.King & H.Rob.
- Nothocalais (A.Gray) Greene
- Nothoschkuhria B.G.Baldwin
- Nothovernonia H.Rob. & V.A.Funk
- Noticastrum DC.
- Notisia P.S.Short
- Notobasis (Cass.) Cass. – Syrian thistle
- Notopappus Klingenb.
- Notoseris C.Shih
- Nouelia Franch. – synonym of Leucomeris D.Don
- Novaguinea D.J.N.Hind
- Novenia S.E.Freire
- Nuriaea Susanna, Calleja & Moreyra

== O ==
List of genera is from Plants of the World Online as of June 2025 unless otherwise cited.

- Oblivia Strother
- Ochrocephala Dittrich
- Oclemena Greene
- Odixia Orchard
- Odontocline B.Nord.
- Oedera L.
- Okia H.Rob. & Skvarla
- Oldenburgia Less.
- Oldfeltia B.Nord. & Lundin
- Olearia Moench
- Olgaea Iljin
- Oligactis Cass.
- Oliganthes Cass.
- Oligochaeta K.Koch
- Oligothrix DC.
- Omalotheca Cass. – arctic cudweed
- Omphalopappus O.Hoffm.
- Oncosiphon Källersjö
- Ondetia Benth.
- Onopordum L. – cotton thistle
- Onoseris Willd.
- Oocephala (S.B.Jones) H.Rob.
- Oonopsis (Nutt.) Greene – false goldenweed
- Oparanthus Sherff
- Ophryosporus Meyen
- Opisthopappus C.Shih
- Orbivestus H.Rob.
- Oreochrysum Rydb.
- Oreoseris DC.
- Oreostemma Greene
- Oresbia Cron & B.Nord.
- Oriastrum Poepp.
- Oritrophium (Kunth) Cuatrec.
- Orochaenactis Coville
- Orognaphalon G.L.Nesom
- Orthopappus Gleason
- Ortizacalia Pruski
- Osbertia Greene
- Osmadenia Nutt.
- Osmiopsis R.M.King & H.Rob.
- Osmitopsis Cass.
- Osteospermum L.
- Oteiza La Llave
- Othonna L.
- Otoglyphis Pomel
- Otopappus Benth.
- Otospermum Willk.
- Oxycarpha S.F.Blake
- Oxylaena Benth. ex Anderb.
- Oxylobus (Moc. ex DC.) A.Gray
- Oxypappus Benth.
- Oxyphyllum Phil.
- Oyedaea DC.
- Ozothamnus R.Br.

== P ==
List of genera is from Plants of the World Online as of June 2025 unless otherwise cited.

- Pachylaena D.Don ex Hook. & Arn.
- Pachystegia Cheeseman
- Pacifigeron G.L.Nesom
- Packera A.Love & D.Love
- Pacourina Aubl.
- Paenula Orchard
- Palafoxia Lag. – palafox
- Pallenis (Cass.) Cass.
- Panaetia Cass.
- Paneroa E.E.Schill.
- Panphalea Lag.
- Pappobolus S.F.Blake
- Pappochroma Raf.
- Papuacalia Veldkamp
- Paquirea Panero & S.E.Freire
- Paracalia Cuatrec.
- Parafaujasia C.Jeffrey
- Paragynoxys (Cuatrec.) Cuatrec.
- Paralychnophora MacLeish
- Paranephelius Poepp.
- Parantennaria Beauverd
- Parapiqueria R.M.King & H.Rob.
- Parapolydora H.Rob.
- Paraprenanthes C.C.Chang ex C.Shih
- Parasenecio W.W.Sm. & Small – Indian plantain
- Parastrephia Nutt.
- Parthenice A.Gray
- Parthenium L. – feverfew, guayule
- Pasaccardoa Kuntze
- Pascalia Ortega
- Paurolepis S.Moore
- Pechuel-loeschea O.Hoffm.
- Pectis L. – cinchweed, fetid marigold
- Pegolettia Cass.
- Pelucha S.Watson
- Pembertonia P.S.Short
- Pentacalia Cass.
- Pentachaeta Nutt. – pygmy daisy
- Pentalepis F.Muell.
- Pentanema Cass.
- Pentatrichia Klatt
- Pentzia Thunb.
- Perdicium L.
- Perezia Lag.
- Pericallis D.Don – includes florist's cineraria
- Pericome A.Gray
- Peripleura (N.T.Burb.) G.L.Nesom
- Perityle Benth. – rock daisy
- Perralderia Coss.
- Pertya Sch.Bip.
- Perymeniopsis H.Rob.
- Perymenium Schrad.
- Petalacte D.Don
- Petasites Mill. – butterbur
- Peteravenia R.M.King & H.Rob.
- Petradoria Greene – rock goldenrod
- Petrobium R.Br.
- Peucephyllum A.Gray
- Phacellothrix F.Muell.
- Phaenocoma D.Don
- Phagnalon Cass.
- Phalacrachena Iljin
- Phalacraea DC.
- Phalacrocarpum Willk.
- Phalacroseris A.Gray – mock dandelion
- Phaneroglossa B.Nord.
- Phania DC.
- Phaseolaster G.L.Nesom
- Philactis Schrad.
- Philoglossa DC.
- Phitosia Kamari & Greuter
- Phoebanthus S.F.Blake – false sunflower
- Phonus Hill
- Phyllocephalum Blume
- Phymaspermum Less.
- Picnomon Adans.
- Picradeniopsis Rydb. – bahia
- Picris L. – oxtongue
- Picrosia D.Don
- Pilbara Lander
- Pilosella Hill
- Pinaropappus Less. – rock lettuce
- Pinillosia Ossa
- Piora J.Kost.
- Pippenalia McVaugh
- Piptocarpha R.Br. – ash daisy
- Piptocoma Less. – velvetshrub
- Piptolepis Sch.Bip.
- Piqueria Cav.
- Piqueriella R.M.King & H.Rob.
- Pithocarpa Lindl.
- Pittocaulon H.Rob. & Brettell
- Pityopsis Nutt. – silkgrass
- Pladaroxylon (Endl.) Hook.f.
- Plagiobasis Schrenk
- Plagiocheilus Arn. ex DC.
- Plagiolophus Greenm.
- Plagius L'Her. ex DC.
- Planaltoa Taub.
- Planea P.O.Karis
- Plateilema Cockerell
- Platycarpha Less.
- Platycarphella V.A.Funk & H.Rob.
- Platypodanthera R.M.King & H.Rob.
- Platyschkuhria Rydb. – basin daisy
- Plazia Ruiz & Pav.
- Plecostachys Hilliard & B.L.Burtt
- Plectocephalus D.Don
- Pleiacanthus (Nutt.) Rydb.
- Pleiotaxis Steetz
- Pleocarphus D.Don
- Pleurocarpaea Benth.
- Pleurocoronis R.M.King & H.Rob.
- Pleurophyllum Hook.f.
- Pluchea Cass. – camphorweed, fleabane
- Podachaenium Benth. ex Oerst.
- Podanthus Lag.
- Podocalea Pruski
- Podocoma Cass.
- Podolepis Labill.
- Podotheca Cass.
- Poecilolepis Grau
- Pogonolepis Steetz
- Pojarkovia Askerova
- Poljakanthema Kamelin
- Poljakovia Grubov & Filatova
- Polyachyrus Lag. – synonym of Leucheria Lag.
- Polyanthina R.M.King & H.Rob.
- Polyarrhena Cass.
- Polycalymma F.Muell. & Sond.
- Polymnia Kalm
- Porophyllum Guett. – poreleaf
- Porphyrostemma Benth. ex Oliv.
- Praxeliopsis G.M.Barroso
- Praxelis Cass.
- Prenanthella Rydb.
- Prenanthes L. – rattlesnakeroot
- Prestelia Sch.Bip. ex Benth. & Hook.f.
- Printzia Cass.
- Prolobus R.M.King & H.Rob.
- Prolongoa Boiss.
- Proteopsis Mart. & Zucc. ex Sch.Bip.
- Proustia Lag.
- Psacaliopsis H.Rob. & Brettell
- Psacalium Cass. – Indianbush
- Psathyrotes A.Gray – turtleback, brittlestem
- Psathyrotopsis Rydb.
- Psednotrichia Hiern
- Psephellus Cass.
- Pseudelephantopus Rohr – dog's-tongue
- Pseudoajania S.S.Ying
- Pseudobaccharis Cabrera
- Pseudobahia Rydb. – sunburst
- Pseudoblepharispermum J.-P.Lebrun & Stork
- Pseudobrickellia R.M.King & H.Rob.
- Pseudoclappia Rydb. – false clapdaisy
- Pseudoconyza Cuatrec.
- Pseudoglossanthis Poljakov
- Pseudognaphalium Kirp. – cudweed
- Pseudogynoxys (Greenm.) Cabrera
- Pseudohandelia Tzvelev
- Pseudonoseris H.Rob. & Brettell
- Pseudopegolettia H.Rob., Skvarla & V.A.Funk
- Pseudopiptocarpha H.Rob.
- Pseudopodospermum (Lipsch. & Krasch.) Kuth.
- Pseudostifftia H.Rob.
- Psiadia Jacq.
- Psilactis A.Gray – tansyaster
- Psilocarphus Nutt. – woollyheads
- Psilostrophe DC. – paperflower
- Psychrogeton Boiss.
- Pterachaenia (Benth. & Hook.f.) Lipsch.
- Pterocaulon Elliott – blackroot
- Pterochaeta Steetz
- Pteronia L.
- Pterothrix DC.
- Pterygopappus Hook.f.
- Ptilostemon Cass.
- Pulicaria Gaertn. – false fleabane
- Pulicarioidea Bunwong, Chantar. & S.C.Keeley
- Pycnosorus Benth.
- Pyrrhopappus DC. – desert chicory
- Pyrrocoma Hook. – goldenweed
- Pytinicarpa G.L.Nesom

== Q ==
List of genera is from Plants of the World Online as of June 2025 unless otherwise cited.

- Qineryangia Y.S.Chen & Lian S.Xu
- Quadribractea Orchard
- Quasiantennaria R.J.Bayer & M.O.Dillon
- Quechualia H.Rob.
- Quelchia N.E.Br.
- Quinetia Cass.
- Quinqueremulus Paul G.Wilson

== R ==
List of genera is from Plants of the World Online as of June 2025 unless otherwise cited.

- Rachelia J.M.Ward & Breitw.
- Radlkoferotoma Kuntze
- Rafinesquia Nutt. – California chicory
- Raillardella (A.Gray) Benth. & Hook.f. – silvermat (?)
- Rainiera Greene
- Ramaliella Zaika, Sukhor. & N.Kilian
- Raoulia Hook.f. – vegetable sheep
- Raouliopsis S.F.Blake
- Rastrophyllum Wild & G.V.Pope
- Ratibida Raf. – prairie coneflower
- Raulinoreitzia R.M.King & H.Rob.
- Rayjacksonia R.L.Hartm. & M.A.Lane – tansyaster (?)
- Reichardia Roth – brighteyes
- Remya Hillebr. ex Benth. & Hook.f.
- Rensonia S.F.Blake
- Rhagadiolus Juss.
- Rhamphogyne S.Moore
- Rhanteriopsis Rauschert
- Rhanterium Desf.
- Rhaponticoides Vaill.
- Rhaponticum Ludwig
- Rhetinocarpha Paul G.Wilson & M.A.Wilson
- Rhetinolepis Coss.
- Rhodanthe Lindl. – sunray
- Rhodanthemum B.H.Wilcox, K.Bremer & Humphries
- Rhynchopsidium DC.
- Richterago Kuntze
- Richteria Kar. & Kir.
- Riencourtia Cass.
- Rigiopappus A. Gray
- Robinsonecio T.M.Barkley & Janovec
- Robinsonia DC.
- Rochonia DC.
- Roebuckiella P.S.Short
- Roessleria Stångb. & Anderb.
- Rojasianthe Standl. & Steyerm.
- Rolandra Rottb. – yerba de plata
- Roldana La Llave – groundsel
- Roodebergia B.Nord.
- Roquea Loeuille & Antar
- Rothmaleria Font Quer
- Rudbeckia L. – coneflower
- Rugelia Shuttlew. ex Chapm. – Rugel's Indian plantain
- Rumfordia DC.
- Russowia C.Winkl.
- Rutidosis DC.

== S ==
List of genera is from Plants of the World Online as of June 2025 unless otherwise cited.

- Sabazia Cass.
- Sachsia Griseb.
- Salcedoa Jiménez Rodr. & Katinas
- Salmea DC. – bejuco de miel
- Sampera V.A.Funk & H.Rob.
- Sanrobertia G.L.Nesom
- Santolina L. – lavender cotton
- Santosia R.M.King & H.Rob.
- Sanvitalia Lam. – creeping zinnia
- Sarcanthemum Cass.
- Sartwellia A.Gray – glowwort
- Saussurea DC. – saw-wort
- Scabrethia W.A.Weber
- Scalesia Arn.
- Scapisenecio Schmidt-Leb.
- Scherya R.M.King & H.Rob.
- Schischkinia Iljin
- Schistocarpha Less.
- Schistostephium Less.
- Schizogyne Cass.
- Schizoptera Turcz.
- Schizotrichia Benth.
- Schkuhria Roth – false threadleaf
- Schlagintweitia Griseb.
- Schlechtendalia Less.
- Schoenia Steetz
- Sciadocephala Mattf.
- Sclerocarpus Jacq. – bonebract
- Sclerolepis Cass. – bogbutton
- Sclerorhachis (Rech.f.) Rech.f.
- Scolymus Tourn. ex L. – golden thistle
- Scorzonera L. – salsify
- Scorzoneroides Moench
- Scrobicaria Cass.
- Selloa Kunth
- Semiria D.J.N.Hind
- Senecio L. – groundsel, ragwort
- Sericocarpus Nees – whitetop aster
- Seriphium L.
- Serratula L. – plumeless saw-wort
- Shafera Greenm.
- Shangwua Yu J.Wang, Raab-Straube, Susanna & J.Quan Liu
- Shawia J.R.Forst. & G.Forst.
- × Shawmisia Z.H.Feng & Su Liu (Celmisia × Shawia)
- Sheareria S.Moore
- Shinnersia R.M.King & H.Rob.
- Shinnersoseris Tomb – beaked skeletonweed
- Siapaea Pruski
- Sidneya E.E.Schill. & Panero
- Siebera J.Gay
- Siemssenia Steetz
- Sigesbeckia L. – St. Paul's wort
- Siloxerus Labill.
- Silphidium (Torr. & A.Gray) Mesfin & D.J.Crawford
- Silphium L. – rosinweed
- Silybum Adans. – milk thistle
- Simsia Pers. – bush sunflower
- Sinacalia H.Rob. & Brettell
- Sinclairia Hook. & Arn.
- Sinosenecio B.Nord.
- Sinoseris N.Kilian, Ze H.Wang & H.Peng
- Smallanthus Mack.
- Soaresia Sch.Bip.
- Solanecio (Sch.Bip.) Walp.
- Solenogyne Cass.
- Solidago L. – goldenrod
- Soliva Ruiz & Pav. – burrweed
- Sommerfeltia Less.
- Sonchella Sennikov
- Sonchus L. – sow thistle, sowthistle
- Sondottia P.S.Short
- Soroseris Stebbins
- Spaniopappus B.L.Rob.
- Sphaeranthus L.
- Sphaereupatorium Kuntze
- Sphaeromorphaea DC.
- Sphagneticola O.Hoffm. – creeping-oxeye
- Spilanthes Jacq. – toothache flower
- Spinoliva G.Sancho, Luebert & Katinas
- Spiracantha Kunth – dogwoodleaf
- Spiroseris Rech.f.
- Spongotrichum (DC.) Nees ex Spach
- Squamopappus R.K.Jansen, N.A.Harriman & Urbatsch
- Stachycephalum Sch.Bip. ex Benth.
- Staehelina L.
- Standleyanthus R.M.King & H.Rob.
- Staurochlamys Baker
- Stebbinsoseris K.L.Chambers
- Steiractinia S.F.Blake
- Steirodiscus Less.
- Stenachaenium Benth.
- Stenocarpha S.F.Blake
- Stenocephalum Sch.Bip.
- Stenocline DC.
- Stenopadus S.F.Blake
- Stenops B.Nord.
- Stenotus Nutt. – mock goldenweed
- Stephanbeckia H.Rob. & V.A.Funk
- Stephanodoria Greene
- Stephanomeria Nutt. – wire lettuce
- Stevia Cav. – candyleaf
- Steviopsis R.M.King & H.Rob.
- Steyermarkina R.M.King & H.Rob.
- Stifftia J.C.Mikan
- Stilpnogyne DC.
- Stilpnolepis Krasch.
- Stilpnopappus Mart. ex DC.
- Stizolophus Cass.
- Stoebe L.
- Stokesia L'Hér.
- Stomatanthes R.M.King & H.Rob.
- Stomatochaeta (S.F.Blake) Maguire & Wurdack
- Stramentopappus H.Rob. & V.A.Funk
- Streptoglossa Steetz ex F.Muell.
- Strobocalyx (Blume ex DC.) Spach
- Strotheria B.L.Turner
- Struchium P.Browne
- Stuartina Sond.
- Stylocline Nutt. – neststraw, woolly fishhooks
- Stylotrichium Mattf.
- Symphyllocarpus Maxim.
- Symphyopappus Turcz.
- Symphyotrichum Nees
- Syncalathium Lipsch.
- Syncarpha DC.
- Syncephalum DC.
- Syncretocarpus S.F.Blake
- Synedrella Gaertn.
- Synedrellopsis Hieron. & Kuntze
- Syneilesis Maxim.
- Synotis (C.B.Clarke) C.Jeffrey & Y.L.Chen
- Syntrichopappus A.Gray – Fremont's gold
- Synurus Iljin
- Syreitschikovia Pavlov

== T ==
List of genera is from Plants of the World Online as of June 2025 unless otherwise cited.

- Tagetes L. – marigold
- Taimingasa (Kitam.) C.Ren & Q.E.Yang
- Takhtajaniantha Nazarova
- Talamancalia H.Rob. & Cuatrec.
- Talamancaster Pruski
- Tamananthus V.M.Badillo
- Tamaulipa R.M.King & H.Rob. – boneset
- Tanacetopsis (Tzvelev) Kovalevsk.
- Tanacetum L. – tansy, feverfew
- Taplinia Lander
- Taraxacum F.H.Wigg. – dandelion
- Tarchonanthus L.
- Tarlmounia H.Rob., S.C.Keeley, Skvarla & R.Chan
- Tehuana Panero & Villaseñor
- Tehuasca Panero
- Teixeiranthus R.M.King & H.Rob.
- Telanthophora H.Rob. & Brettell
- Telekia Baumg.
- Telmatophila Mart. ex Baker
- Tenrhynea Hilliard & B.L.Burtt
- Tephroseris (Rchb.) Rchb. – fleawort
- Tepuipappus Pruski
- Tessaria Ruiz & Pav.
- Tetrachyron Schltdl.
- Tetradymia DC. – horsebrush
- Tetragonotheca L. – nerveray
- Tetramolopium Nees
- Tetraneuris Greene – four-nerve daisy
- Tetranthus Sw.
- Tetraperone Urb.
- Thaminophyllum Harv.
- Thelesperma Less. – greenthread
- Thespidium F.Muell. ex Benth.
- Thespis DC.
- Thevenotia DC.
- Thiseltonia Hemsl.
- Thurovia Rose
- Thymophylla Lag. – pricklyleaf
- Thymopsis Benth.
- Tietkensia P.S.Short
- Tilesia G.Mey.
- Tithonia Desf. ex Juss.
- Toiyabea R.P.Roberts, Urbatsch & Neubig
- Tolpis Adans. – umbrella milkwort
- Tomentaurum G.L.Nesom
- Tonalanthus Brandegee
- Tonestus A.Nelson – serpentweed
- Tourneuxia Coss.
- Townsendia Hook. – Townsend daisy
- Tracyina S.F.Blake – Indian headdress
- Tragopogon L. – goat's beard, salsify
- Traversia Hook.f.
- Trepadonia H.Rob.
- Trichanthemis Regel & Schmalh.
- Trichanthodium Sond. & F.Muell.
- Trichocline Cass.
- Trichocoronis A.Gray – bugheal
- Trichocoryne S.F.Blake
- Trichogonia (DC.) Gardner
- Trichogoniopsis R.M.King & H.Rob.
- Tricholepis DC.
- Trichoptilium A.Gray
- Trichospira Kunth
- Tridactylina Sch.Bip.
- Tridax L.
- Trigonopterum Steetz
- Trigonospermum Less.
- Trilisa (Cass.) Cass.
- Trioncinia (F.Muell.) Veldkamp
- × Tripleurocota Starm. (Cota × Tripleurospermum)
- Tripleurospermum Sch.Bip. – mayweed
- Triplocephalum O.Hoffm.
- Tripolium Nees – sea aster (?)
- Triptilion Ruiz & Pav.
- Triptilodiscus Turcz.
- Trixis Sw.
- Troglophyton Hilliard & B.L.Burtt
- Tuberculocarpus Pruski
- Tuberostylis Steetz
- Tugarinovia Iljin
- Turanecio Hamzaoğlu
- Turczaninovia DC.
- Tussilago L. – coltsfoot
- Tuxtla Villaseñor & Strother
- Tyleropappus Greenm. – synonym of Calea
- Tyrimnus (Cass.) Bosc
- Tzvelevopyrethrum Kamelin

== U ==
List of genera is from Plants of the World Online as of June 2025 unless otherwise cited.

- Ugamia Pavlov
- Uleophytum Hieron.
- Uniyala H.Rob. & Skvarla
- Unxia Kunth
- Urbinella Greenm.
- Urmenetea Phil.
- Urolepis (DC.) R.M.King & H.Rob.
- Uropappus Nutt.
- Urospermum Scop.
- Urostemon B.Nord.
- Ursinia Gaertn.

== V ==
List of genera is from Plants of the World Online as of June 2025 unless otherwise cited.

- Varilla A.Gray
- Vellereophyton Hilliard & B.L.Burtt
- Venegasia DC.
- Verbesina L. – crownbeard
- Vernonanthura H.Rob.
- Vernonella Sond.
- Vernonia Schreb. – ironweed
- Vernoniastrum H.Rob.
- Vicinia G.L.Nesom
- Vickia Roque & G.Sancho
- Vickianthus H.Rob.
- Vickifunkia C.Ren, L.Wang, I.D.Illar. & Q.E.Yang
- Vicoa Cass.
- Vieraea Sch.Bip.
- Vigethia W.A.Weber
- Viguiera Kunth – goldeneye
- Villanova Lag.
- Villasenoria B.L.Clark
- Vinicia Dematt.
- Vittadinia A.Rich.
- Vittetia R.M.King & H.Rob.
- Vogtia Oberpr. & Sonboli
- Volutaria Cass.

== W ==
List of genera is from Plants of the World Online as of June 2025 unless otherwise cited.

- Waitzia J.C.Wendl.
- Walshia Jeanes
- Walsholaria G.L.Nesom
- Wamalchitamia Strother
- Warionia Benth. & Coss.
- Wedelia Jacq. – creepingoxeye
- Welwitschiella O.Hoffm.
- Werneria Kunth
- Westoniella Cuatrec.
- Wilkesia A.Gray – iliau
- Willemetia Neck.
- Wollastonia DC. ex Decne.
- Wollemiaster G.L.Nesom
- Wunderlichia Riedel ex Benth. & Hook.f.
- Wyethia Nutt. – mule-ears

== X ==
List of genera is from Plants of the World Online as of June 2025 unless otherwise cited. Common names are cited individually.

- Xanthisma DC. – sleepy-daisy
- Xanthium L. – cocklebur
- Xanthocephalum Willd.
- Xanthopappus C.Winkl.
- Xeranthemum L.
- Xerochrysum Tzvelev
- Xiphochaeta Poepp.
- Xylanthemum Tzvelev
- Xylorhiza Nutt. – woody-asters
- Xylothamia G.L.Nesom, Y.B.Suh, D.R.Morgan & B.B.Simpson

== Y ==
List of genera is from Plants of the World Online as of June 2025 unless otherwise cited. Common names are cited individually.

- Yariguianthus S.Diáz & Rodr.-Cabeza
- Yermo Dorn – desert yellowhead
- Youngia Cass.
- Yunquea Skottsb.

== Z ==
List of genera is from Plants of the World Online as of June 2025 unless otherwise cited.

- Zaluzania Pers.
- Zandera D.L.Schulz
- Zemisia B.Nord.
- Zexmenia La Llave
- Zinnia L.
- Zoegea L.
- Zyrphelis Cass.
- Zyzyura H.Rob. & Pruski
- Zyzyxia Strother
