= Allocephalus =

Scientific classification
- Kingdom: Plantae
- Clade: Tracheophytes
- Clade: Angiosperms
- Clade: Eudicots
- Clade: Asterids
- Order: Asterales
- Family: Asteraceae
- Genus: Allocephalus; Bringel, J.N.Nakaj. & H.Rob.

Genus of flowering plants

Allocephalus is a genus of flowering plants belonging to the family Asteraceae.

Its native range is Brazil.

Species:

- Allocephalus gamolepis Bringel, J.N.Nakaj. & H.Rob.
