= Heteroplexis =

Scientific classification
- Kingdom: Plantae
- Clade: Tracheophytes
- Clade: Angiosperms
- Clade: Eudicots
- Clade: Asterids
- Order: Asterales
- Family: Asteraceae
- Subfamily: Asteroideae
- Tribe: Astereae
- Subtribe: Grangeinae
- Genus: Heteroplexis; C.C.Chang

Type species
- Heteroplexis vernonioides C.C.Chang

Genus of flowering plants

Heteroplexis is a genus of Chinese flowering plants in the family Asteraceae.

Species

- Heteroplexis impressinervia J.Y.Liang
- Heteroplexis incana J.Y.Liang
- Heteroplexis microcephala Y.L.Chen
- Heteroplexis sericophylla Y.L.Chen
- Heteroplexis vernonioides C.C.Chang
