= Novaguinea =

Scientific classification
- Kingdom: Plantae
- Clade: Tracheophytes
- Clade: Angiosperms
- Clade: Eudicots
- Clade: Asterids
- Order: Asterales
- Family: Asteraceae
- Genus: Novaguinea; D.J.N.Hind
- Species: N. rudalliae

Binomial name
- Novaguinea rudalliae D.J.N.Hind

Genus of flowering plants

Novaguinea is a genus of flowering plants in the family Asteraceae. It includes a single species, Novaguinea rudalliae, which is native to western New Guinea.
