= Iotasperma =

Scientific classification
- Kingdom: Plantae
- Clade: Embryophytes
- Clade: Tracheophytes
- Clade: Angiosperms
- Clade: Eudicots
- Clade: Asterids
- Order: Asterales
- Family: Asteraceae
- Subfamily: Asteroideae
- Tribe: Astereae
- Subtribe: Brachyscominae
- Genus: Iotasperma; G.L.Nesom (1994)

Species
- See text

Genus of flowering plants

Iotasperma are a genus of flowering plants in the composite family Asteraceae, native to Australia. They are erect annual herbs.

== Species ==
Currently accepted species include:

- Iotasperma australiensis G.L.Nesom
- Iotasperma sessilifolia (F.Muell.) G.L.Nesom
