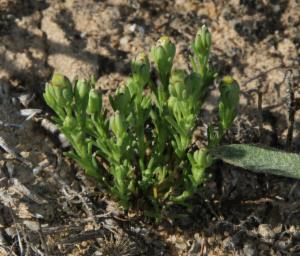
- Elachanthus pusillus

Scientific classification
- Kingdom: Plantae
- Clade: Tracheophytes
- Clade: Angiosperms
- Clade: Eudicots
- Clade: Asterids
- Order: Asterales
- Family: Asteraceae
- Subfamily: Asteroideae
- Tribe: Astereae
- Subtribe: Brachyscominae
- Genus: Elachanthus; F.Muell.

Type species
- Elachanthus pusillus F.Muell.

Synonyms
- Cotula sect. Elachanthus (F.Muell.) Baill.

= Elachanthus =

Genus of flowering plants

Elachanthus is a genus of Australian flowering plants in the family Asteraceae.

Species

- Elachanthus glaber Paul G.Wilson - South Australia, Victoria
- Elachanthus pusillus F.Muell. - South Australia, Victoria, New South Wales, Western Australia
