= Poljakovia =

Scientific classification
- Kingdom: Plantae
- Clade: Tracheophytes
- Clade: Angiosperms
- Clade: Eudicots
- Clade: Asterids
- Order: Asterales
- Family: Asteraceae
- Genus: Poljakovia; Grubov & Filatova

Genus of flowering plant

Poljakovia is a genus of flowering plants belonging to the family Asteraceae.

Its native range is northern China. It is found in China north-central, (Beijing, Gansu, Hebei, Shaanxi, Shandong, Shanxi and Tianjin), Inner Mongolia and Xinjiang.

The genus name of Poljakovia is in honour of Petr Petrovich Poljakov (1902–1974), a Russian botanist, who was a specialist in Asteraceae and sub-Siberian plants. It was first described and published in Novosti Sist. Vyssh. Rast. Vol.33 on page 226 in 2001.

== Known species ==
According to Kew:

- Poljakovia alashanensis (Ling) Grubov & Filatova
- Poljakovia kaschgarica (Krasch.) Grubov & Filatova
