= Paquirea =

Scientific classification
- Kingdom: Plantae
- Clade: Tracheophytes
- Clade: Angiosperms
- Clade: Eudicots
- Clade: Asterids
- Order: Asterales
- Family: Asteraceae
- Genus: Paquirea; Panero & S.E.Freire
- Species: P. lanceolata

Binomial name
- Paquirea lanceolata (H.Beltrán & Ferreyra) Panero & S.E.Freire

Genus of plants

Paquirea is a monotypic genus of flowering plants belonging to the family Asteraceae. The only species is Paquirea lanceolata.

Its native range is Peru.
