= Neobrachyactis =

Scientific classification
- Kingdom: Plantae
- Clade: Tracheophytes
- Clade: Angiosperms
- Clade: Eudicots
- Clade: Asterids
- Order: Asterales
- Family: Asteraceae
- Subfamily: Asteroideae
- Tribe: Astereae
- Genus: Neobrachyactis; Brouillet

Genus of flowering plants

Neobrachyactis is a genus of flowering plants in the family Asteraceae. It includes four species native to Asia, ranging from Iraq to Central Asia, the Himalayas, and Xinjiang.

== Species ==
Four species are accepted.

- Neobrachyactis anomala (DC.) Brouillet
- Neobrachyactis obovata (Benth.) Farhani & Kaz.Osaloo
- Neobrachyactis pubescens (DC.) Brouillet
- Neobrachyactis roylei (DC.) Brouillet
