= Turanecio =

Scientific classification
- Kingdom: Plantae
- Clade: Tracheophytes
- Clade: Angiosperms
- Clade: Eudicots
- Clade: Asterids
- Order: Asterales
- Family: Asteraceae
- Genus: Turanecio; Hamzaoğlu

Genus of flowering plants

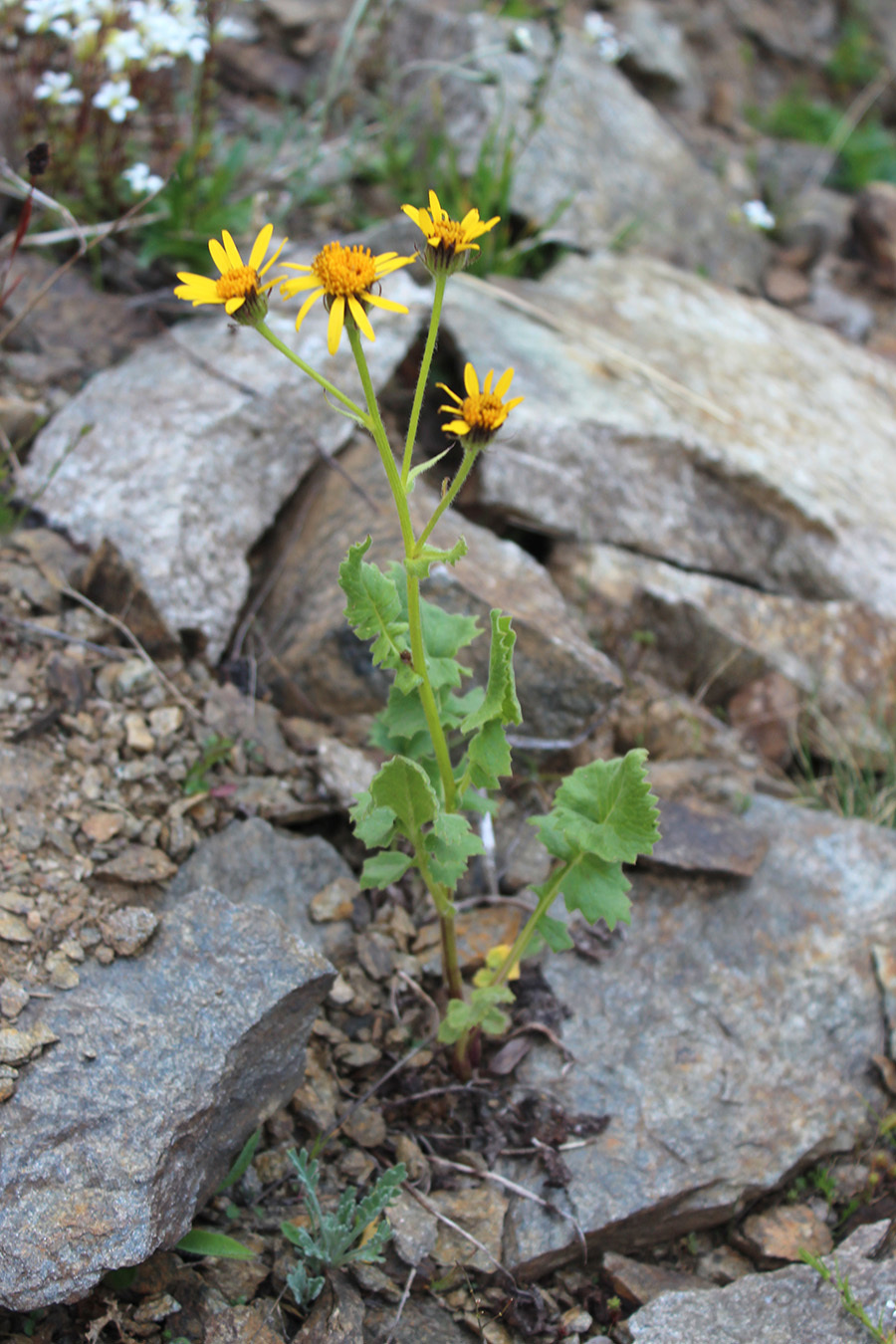
Turanecio taraxacifolius.

Turanecio is a genus of flowering plants belonging to the family Asteraceae. It includes 14 species native to Turkey, the Caucasus, Iran, and northern Iraq.

== Species ==
14 species are accepted.

- Turanecio cariensis (Boiss.) Hamzaoğlu
- Turanecio caucasica (M.Bieb.) Bozkurt, Uysal & Hamzaoğlu
- Turanecio davisii (V.A.Matthews) Hamzaoğlu
- Turanecio eriospermus (DC.) Hamzaoğlu
- Turanecio farfarifolius (Boiss. & Kotschy) Hamzaoğlu
- Turanecio hypochionaeus (Boiss.) Hamzaoğlu
- Turanecio jurineifolius (Boiss. & Balansa) Hamzaoğlu
- Turanecio kubensis (Grossh.) Hamzaoğlu
- Turanecio lazicus (Boiss. & Balansa) Hamzaoğlu
- Turanecio lorentii (Hochst.) Hamzaoğlu
- Turanecio massagetovii (Schischk.) Bozkurt, Uysal & Hamzaoğlu
- Turanecio munzurdaglarensis (Yıld.) Hamzaoğlu
- Turanecio pandurifolius (K.Koch) Hamzaoğlu
- Turanecio taraxacifolius (M.Bieb.) Hamzaoğlu
