= Spinoliva =

Scientific classification
- Kingdom: Plantae
- Clade: Tracheophytes
- Clade: Angiosperms
- Clade: Eudicots
- Clade: Asterids
- Order: Asterales
- Family: Asteraceae
- Genus: Spinoliva; G.Sancho, Luebert & Katinas
- Species: S. ilicifolia

Binomial name
- Spinoliva ilicifolia (Hook. & Arn.) G.Sancho

Genus of plants

Spinoliva is a monotypic genus of flowering plants belonging to the family Asteraceae. The only species is Spinoliva ilicifolia.

The species is found in Chile.
