= Katinasia =

Scientific classification
- Kingdom: Plantae
- Clade: Tracheophytes
- Clade: Angiosperms
- Clade: Eudicots
- Clade: Asterids
- Order: Asterales
- Family: Asteraceae
- Tribe: Astereae
- Subtribe: Hinterhuberinae
- Genus: Katinasia; Bonif.
- Species: K. cabrerae

Binomial name
- Katinasia cabrerae (Bonif.) Bonif.

Synonyms
- Nardophyllum cabrerae Bonif.

Genus of flowering plants

Katinasia is a genus of flowering plants in the family Asteraceae. It contains a single species, Katinasia cabrerae, which is native to Mendoza and Neuquén provinces of western Argentina.
