= Japonicalia =

Scientific classification
- Kingdom: Plantae
- Clade: Tracheophytes
- Clade: Angiosperms
- Clade: Eudicots
- Clade: Asterids
- Order: Asterales
- Family: Asteraceae
- Subfamily: Asteroideae
- Tribe: Senecioneae
- Subtribe: Tussilagininae
- Genus: Japonicalia; C.Ren & Q.E.Yang

Genus of flowering plants

Japonicalia is a genus of flowering plants in the family Asteraceae. It includes three species native to Japan and south-central China.

- Japonicalia delphiniifolia (Siebold & Zucc.) C.Ren & Q.E.Yang – Japan and south-central China (Guizhou and eastern Yunnan)
- Japonicalia kiusiana (Makino) C.Ren & Q.E.Yang – Japan (Kyushu)
- Japonicalia tebakoensis (Makino) C.Ren & Q.E.Yang – central and southern Japan
