= Pseudoajania =

Scientific classification
- Kingdom: Plantae
- Clade: Tracheophytes
- Clade: Angiosperms
- Clade: Eudicots
- Clade: Asterids
- Order: Asterales
- Family: Asteraceae
- Pseudoajania: Pseudoajania; S.S.Ying
- Species: P. taiwanensis

Binomial name
- Pseudoajania taiwanensis S.S.Ying

Genus of flowering plants

Pseudoajania is a genus of flowering plants in the family Asteraceae. It includes a single species, Pseudoajania taiwanensis, which is endemic to Taiwan.

Both the genus and species were described in 2024 by Shao Shun Ying.
