= Apopyros =

Scientific classification
- Kingdom: Plantae
- Clade: Tracheophytes
- Clade: Angiosperms
- Clade: Eudicots
- Clade: Asterids
- Order: Asterales
- Family: Asteraceae
- Genus: Apopyros; G.L.Nesom

Genus of flowering plants

Apopyros is a genus of flowering plants belonging to the family Asteraceae.

Its native range is Brazil to Northeastern Argentina.

Species:

- Apopyros corymbosus (Hook. & Arn.) G.L.Nesom
- Apopyros warmingii (Baker) G.L.Nesom
