= Poljakanthema =

Scientific classification
- Kingdom: Plantae
- Clade: Tracheophytes
- Clade: Angiosperms
- Clade: Eudicots
- Clade: Asterids
- Order: Asterales
- Family: Asteraceae
- Genus: Poljakanthema; Kamelin

Genus of flowering plant

Poljakanthema is a genus of flowering plants belonging to the family Asteraceae.

Its native range is Central Asia. It is found in Kyrgyzstan, Tadzhikistan and Uzbekistan.

The genus name of Poljakanthema is in honour of Petr Petrovich Poljakov (1902–1974), a Russian botanist, who was a specialist in Asteraceae and sub-Siberian plants. It was first described and published in Opred. Rast. Sred. Azii Vol.10 on page 634 in 1993.

== Known species ==
According to Kew:

- Poljakanthema aphanassievii (Krasch.) Kamelin
- Poljakanthema kokanica (Krasch.) Kamelin
