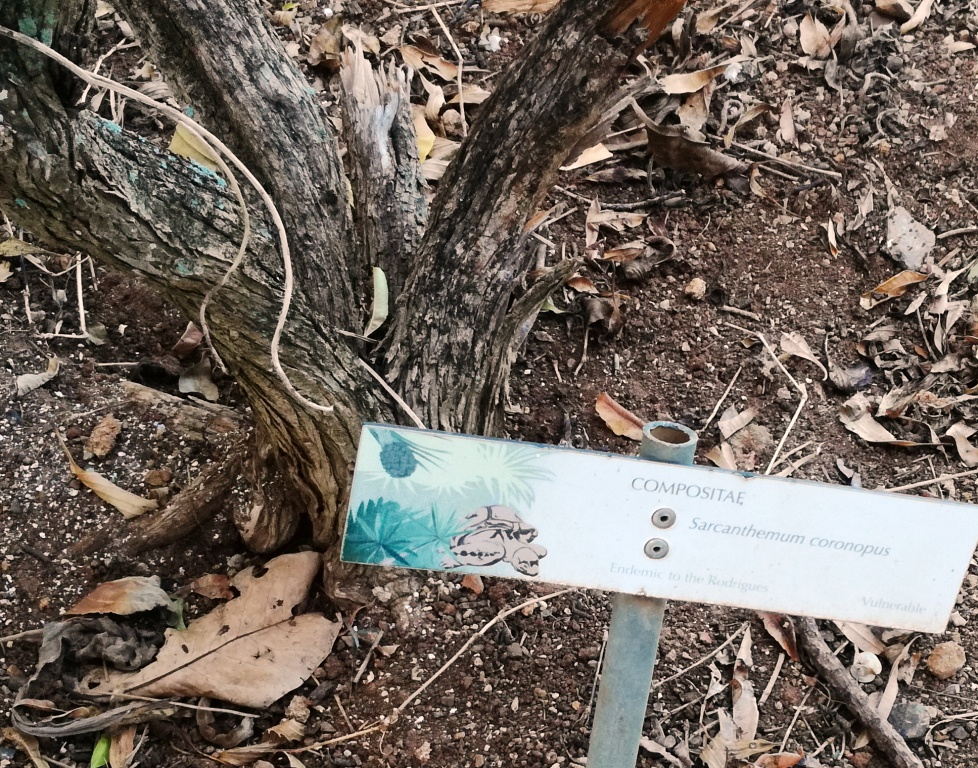
- Sarcanthemum coronopus

Scientific classification
- Kingdom: Plantae
- Clade: Tracheophytes
- Clade: Angiosperms
- Clade: Eudicots
- Clade: Asterids
- Order: Asterales
- Family: Asteraceae
- Genus: Sarcanthemum; Cass.
- Species: S. coronopus

Binomial name
- Sarcanthemum coronopus Cass.

= Sarcanthemum =

Genus of plants

Sarcanthemum is a monotypic genus of flowering plants belonging to the family Asteraceae. The only species is Sarcanthemum coronopus.

Its native range is Rodrigues.
