= Yariguianthus =

Scientific classification
- Kingdom: Plantae
- Clade: Tracheophytes
- Clade: Angiosperms
- Clade: Eudicots
- Clade: Asterids
- Order: Asterales
- Family: Asteraceae
- Genus: Yariguianthus; S.Díaz & Rodr.-Cabeza

Genus of flowering plants

Yariguianthus is a genus of flowering plants belonging to the family Asteraceae.

Its native range is Colombia.

Species:

- Yariguianthus glomerulatus S.Díaz & Rodr.-Cabeza
