= Kieslingia =

Scientific classification
- Kingdom: Plantae
- Clade: Tracheophytes
- Clade: Angiosperms
- Clade: Eudicots
- Clade: Asterids
- Order: Asterales
- Family: Asteraceae
- Subfamily: Asteroideae
- Tribe: Astereae
- Genus: Kieslingia; Faúndez, Saldivia & A.E.Martic.
- Species: K. chilensis

Binomial name
- Kieslingia chilensis Faúndez, Saldivia & A.E.Martic.

Genus of flowering plants

Kieslingia is a genus of flowering plants in the family Asteraceae. It includes a single species, Kieslingia chilensis, which is endemic to Atacama Region of northern Chile. It grows in deserts and dry shrublands. Both genus and species were first described in 2014.
