= Notopappus =

Scientific classification
- Kingdom: Plantae
- Clade: Tracheophytes
- Clade: Angiosperms
- Clade: Eudicots
- Clade: Asterids
- Order: Asterales
- Family: Asteraceae
- Subfamily: Asteroideae
- Tribe: Astereae
- Subtribe: Machaerantherinae
- Genus: Notopappus; Klingenb.

Synonyms
- Chrysophthalmum Phil., nom. illeg.

Genus of flowering plants

Notopappus is a genus of flowering plants in the family Asteraceae. It includes five species native to southern South America.

== Species ==
Five species are accepted.

- Notopappus ameghinoi (Speg.) Klingenb.
- Notopappus andinus (Phil.) Klingenb.
- Notopappus chryseus (Kuntze) Klingenb.
- Notopappus pectinatus (Phil.) Klingenb.
- Notopappus prunelloides (Poepp. ex Less.) Klingenb.
