= Allittia =

Scientific classification
- Kingdom: Plantae
- Clade: Tracheophytes
- Clade: Angiosperms
- Clade: Eudicots
- Clade: Asterids
- Order: Asterales
- Family: Asteraceae
- Genus: Allittia; P.S.Short

Genus of flowering plants

Allittia is a genus of flowering plants belonging to the family Asteraceae.

Its native range is Southeastern Australia, namely New South Wales, Victoria, Tasmania and South Australia.

Species:

- Allittia cardiocarpa (Benth.) P.S.Short
- Allittia uliginosa (G.L.Davis) P.S.Short
