= Caucasoseris =

Scientific classification
- Kingdom: Plantae
- Clade: Tracheophytes
- Clade: Angiosperms
- Clade: Eudicots
- Clade: Asterids
- Order: Asterales
- Family: Asteraceae
- Tribe: Cichorieae
- Subtribe: Chondrillinae
- Genus: Caucasoseris; M.Güzel, N.Kilian, Sennikov & Coșkunç.
- Species: C. abietina

Binomial name
- Caucasoseris abietina (Boiss. & Balansa) M.Güzel, N.Kilian, Sennikov & Coșkunç.

Synonyms
- Cicerbita abietina (Boiss. & Balansa) Stebbins; Crepis abietina (Boiss. & Balansa) Beauverd; Lactuca abietina (Boiss. & Balansa) Bornm.; Mulgedium abietinum Boiss. & Balansa (1875) (basionym); Prenanthes abietina (Boiss. & Balansa) Kirp.

Genus of flowering plants

Caucasoseris is a genus of flowering plants in the family Asteraceae. It includes a single species, Caucasoseris abietina, a perennial native to the Caucasus and northeastern Turkey.
