= Apodocephala =

Scientific classification
- Kingdom: Plantae
- Clade: Tracheophytes
- Clade: Angiosperms
- Clade: Eudicots
- Clade: Asterids
- Order: Asterales
- Family: Asteraceae
- Subfamily: Asteroideae
- Tribe: Astereae
- Subtribe: Madagasterinae
- Genus: Apodocephala; Baker

Type species
- Apodocephala pauciflora Baker

Synonyms
- Lowryanthus Pruski

Genus of flowering plants

Apodocephala is a genus of flowering plants in the family Asteraceae. All known species are endemic to Madagascar.

== Species ==
11 species are accepted.

- Apodocephala angustifolia Humbert
- Apodocephala begueana Humbert
- Apodocephala cacuminum (Humbert) Bengtson & Razafim.
- Apodocephala coursii Humbert
- Apodocephala minor Scott-Elliot
- Apodocephala multiflora Humbert
- Apodocephala oliganthoides Humbert
- Apodocephala pauciflora Baker
- Apodocephala radula Humbert
- Apodocephala rubens (Pruski) Bengtson & Razafim.
- Apodocephala urschiana Humbert
