= Colobanthera =

Scientific classification
- Kingdom: Plantae
- Clade: Tracheophytes
- Clade: Angiosperms
- Clade: Eudicots
- Clade: Asterids
- Order: Asterales
- Family: Asteraceae
- Subfamily: Asteroideae
- Tribe: Astereae
- Subtribe: Grangeinae
- Genus: Colobanthera; Humbert
- Species: C. waterlotii

Binomial name
- Colobanthera waterlotii Humbert

Genus of flowering plants

Colobanthera is a genus of flowering plants in the family Asteraceae.

There is only one known species, Colobanthera waterlotii endemic to Madagascar.
