= Uniyala =

Scientific classification
- Kingdom: Plantae
- Clade: Embryophytes
- Clade: Tracheophytes
- Clade: Spermatophytes
- Clade: Angiosperms
- Clade: Eudicots
- Clade: Asterids
- Order: Asterales
- Family: Asteraceae
- Genus: Uniyala; H.Rob. & Skvarla

Genus of flowering plants

Uniyala is a genus of flowering plants belonging to the family Asteraceae.

Its native range is India and Sri Lanka.

Species:

- Uniyala anamallica (Bedd. ex Gamble) K.S.Kumar & Arum.
- Uniyala anceps (C.B.Clarke ex Hook.f.) H.Rob. & Skvarla
- Uniyala bourdillonii (Gamble) H.Rob. & Skvarla
- Uniyala bourneana (W.W.Sm.) Arum. & K.S.Kumar
- Uniyala comorinensis (W.W.Sm.) H.Rob. & Skvarla
- Uniyala gossypina (Gamble) K.S.Kumar & Arum.
- Uniyala keralensis E.S.S.Kumar & Shareef
- Uniyala malabarica (Hook.f.) Arum. & K.S.Kumar
- Uniyala multibracteata (Gamble) H.Rob. & Skvarla
- Uniyala ramaswamii (Hutch.) H.Rob. & Skvarla
- Uniyala salviifolia (Wight) H.Rob. & Skvarla
- Uniyala wightiana (Arn.) H.Rob. & Skvarla
