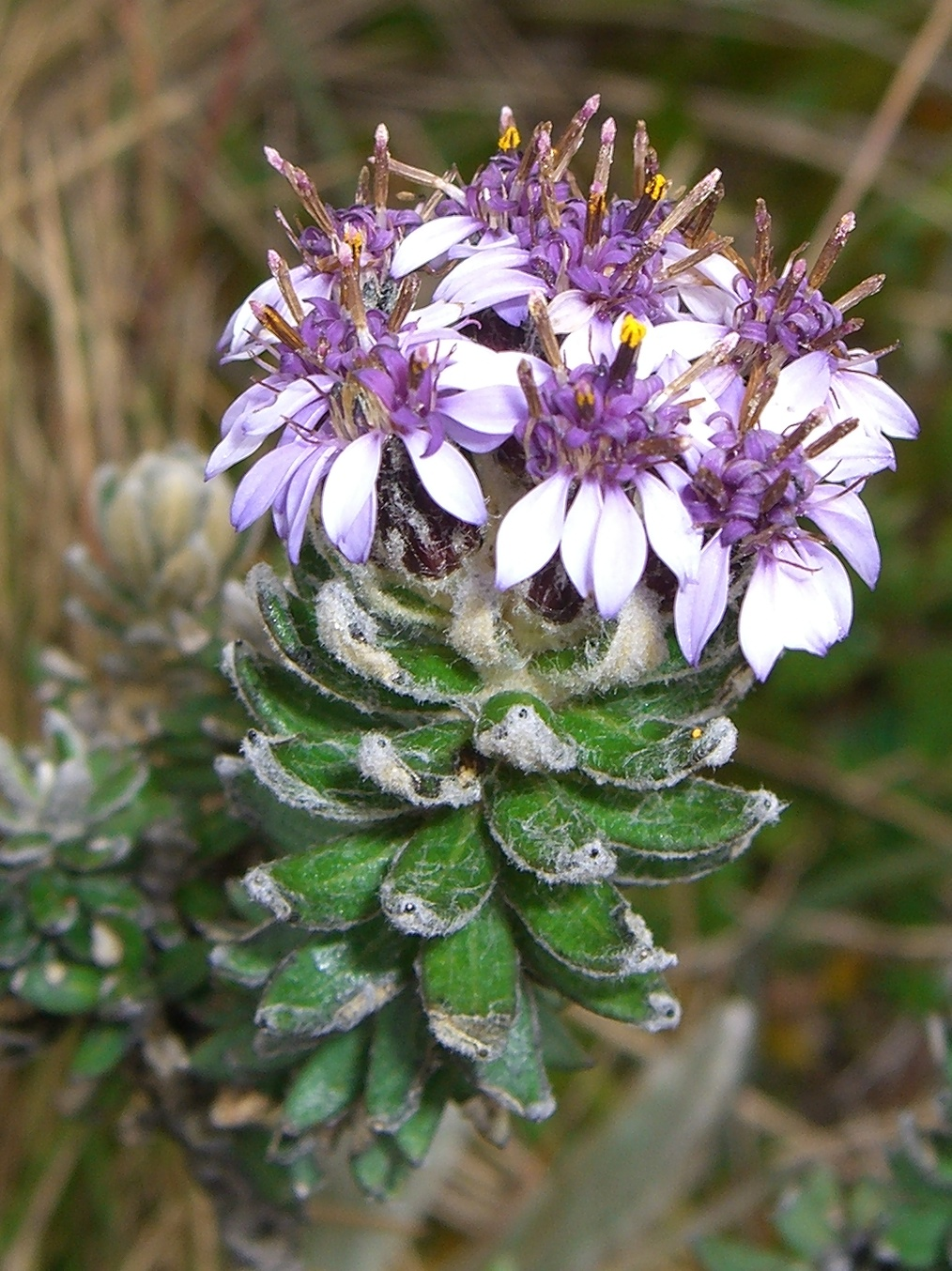
- Diplostephium phylicoides (now Linochilus phylicoides)

Scientific classification
- Kingdom: Plantae
- Clade: Embryophytes
- Clade: Tracheophytes
- Clade: Spermatophytes
- Clade: Angiosperms
- Clade: Eudicots
- Clade: Asterids
- Order: Asterales
- Family: Asteraceae
- Subfamily: Asteroideae
- Tribe: Astereae
- Subtribe: Baccharidinae
- Genus: Linochilus; Benth.

Synonyms
- Piofontia Cuatrec.

= Linochilus =

Genus of plants

Linochilus is a genus of flowering plants belonging to the family Asteraceae.

Its native range is Costa Rica to Northwestern Venezuela and Ecuador.

== Species ==
Species:

- Linochilus alveolatus (Cuatrec.) Saldivia & O.M.Vargas
- Linochilus anactinotus (Wedd.) Saldivia & O.M.Vargas
- Linochilus antioquensis (Cuatrec.) Saldivia & O.M.Vargas
- Linochilus apiculatus (S.F.Blake) Saldivia & O.M.Vargas
- Linochilus bicolor (S.F.Blake) Saldivia & O.M.Vargas
- Linochilus camargoanus (Cuatrec.) Saldivia & O.M.Vargas
- Linochilus cayambensis (Cuatrec.) Saldivia & O.M.Vargas
- Linochilus chrysotrichus (S.Díaz & Restrepo) Saldivia & O.M.Vargas
- Linochilus cinerascens (Cuatrec.) Saldivia & O.M.Vargas
- Linochilus colombianus (Cuatrec.) Saldivia & O.M.Vargas
- Linochilus coriaceus (Cuatrec.) Saldivia & O.M.Vargas
- Linochilus costaricensis (S.F.Blake) Saldivia & O.M.Vargas
- Linochilus crassifolius (Cuatrec.) Saldivia & O.M.Vargas
- Linochilus cyparissias (Wedd.) Saldivia & O.M.Vargas
- Linochilus ellipticus (Cuatrec.) Saldivia & O.M.Vargas
- Linochilus eriophorus (Wedd.) Saldivia & O.M.Vargas
- Linochilus farallonensis (Cuatrec.) Saldivia & O.M.Vargas
- Linochilus floribundus Benth.
- Linochilus fosbergii (Cuatrec.) Saldivia & O.M.Vargas
- Linochilus frontinensis (Cuatrec.) Saldivia & O.M.Vargas
- Linochilus glutinosus (S.F.Blake) Saldivia & O.M.Vargas
- Linochilus grantii (Cuatrec.) Saldivia & O.M.Vargas
- Linochilus heterophyllus (Cuatrec.) Saldivia & O.M.Vargas
- Linochilus huertasii (Cuatrec.) Saldivia & O.M.Vargas
- Linochilus inesianus (Cuatrec.) Saldivia & O.M.Vargas
- Linochilus jaramilloi (Cuatrec.) Saldivia & O.M.Vargas
- Linochilus jenesanus (S.Díaz & M.E.Morales) Saldivia & O.M.Vargas
- Linochilus juajibioyi (Cuatrec.) Saldivia & O.M.Vargas
- Linochilus juliani (Cuatrec.) Saldivia & O.M.Vargas
- Linochilus lacunosus (Cuatrec.) Saldivia & O.M.Vargas
- Linochilus leiocladus (S.F.Blake) Saldivia & O.M.Vargas
- Linochilus micradenius (S.F.Blake) Saldivia & O.M.Vargas
- Linochilus mutiscuanus (Cuatrec.) Saldivia & O.M.Vargas
- Linochilus nevadensis (Cuatrec.) Saldivia & O.M.Vargas
- Linochilus oblongifolius (Cuatrec.) Saldivia & O.M.Vargas
- Linochilus obtusus (S.F.Blake) Saldivia & O.M.Vargas
- Linochilus ocanensis (Cuatrec.) Saldivia & O.M.Vargas
- Linochilus ochraceus (Kunth) Saldivia & O.M.Vargas
- Linochilus parvifolius (S.F.Blake) Saldivia & O.M.Vargas
- Linochilus perijaensis (S.Díaz & G.P.Méndez) Saldivia & O.M.Vargas
- Linochilus phylicoides (Kunth) Saldivia & O.M.Vargas
- Linochilus pittieri (Cuatrec.) Saldivia & O.M.Vargas
- Linochilus rangelii (Cuatrec.) Saldivia & O.M.Vargas
- Linochilus revolutus (S.F.Blake) Saldivia & O.M.Vargas
- Linochilus rhododendroides (Hieron.) Saldivia & O.M.Vargas
- Linochilus rhomboidalis (Cuatrec.) Saldivia & O.M.Vargas
- Linochilus ritterbushii (Cuatrec.) Saldivia & O.M.Vargas
- Linochilus romeroi (Cuatrec.) Saldivia & O.M.Vargas
- Linochilus rosmarinifolius Benth.
- Linochilus rupestris (Kunth) Saldivia & O.M.Vargas
- Linochilus santamartae (Cuatrec.) Saldivia & O.M.Vargas
- Linochilus saxatilis (Cuatrec.) Saldivia & O.M.Vargas
- Linochilus schultzii (Wedd.) Saldivia & O.M.Vargas
- Linochilus tachirensis (V.M.Badillo) Saldivia & O.M.Vargas
- Linochilus tamanus (Cuatrec.) Saldivia & O.M.Vargas
- Linochilus tenuifolius (Cuatrec.) Saldivia & O.M.Vargas
- Linochilus tergocanus (Cuatrec.) Saldivia & O.M.Vargas
- Linochilus venezuelensis (Cuatrec.) Saldivia & O.M.Vargas
- Linochilus violaceus (Cuatrec.) Saldivia & O.M.Vargas
- Linochilus weddellii (S.F.Blake) Saldivia & O.M.Vargas
