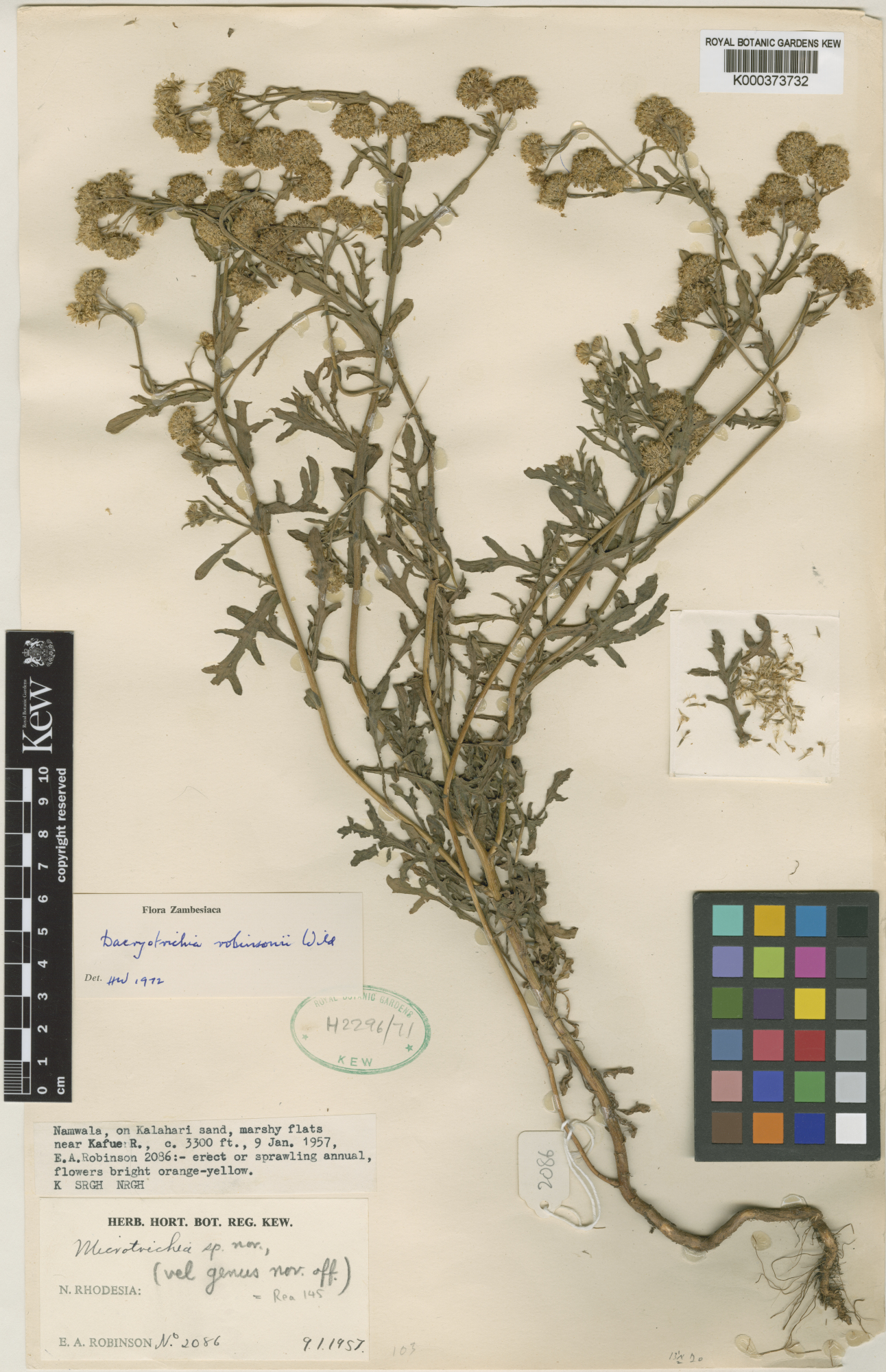

Scientific classification
- Kingdom: Plantae
- Clade: Embryophytes
- Clade: Tracheophytes
- Clade: Angiosperms
- Clade: Eudicots
- Clade: Asterids
- Order: Asterales
- Family: Asteraceae
- Subfamily: Asteroideae
- Tribe: Astereae
- Subtribe: Grangeinae
- Genus: Dacryotrichia; H.Wild
- Species: D. robinsonii

Binomial name
- Dacryotrichia robinsonii H.Wild

= Dacryotrichia =

Genus of flowering plants

Dacryotrichia is a monotypic genus of flowering plants in the family Asteraceae, containing the single species Dacryotrichia robinsonii. It is endemic to the Republic of Zambia in Africa.
