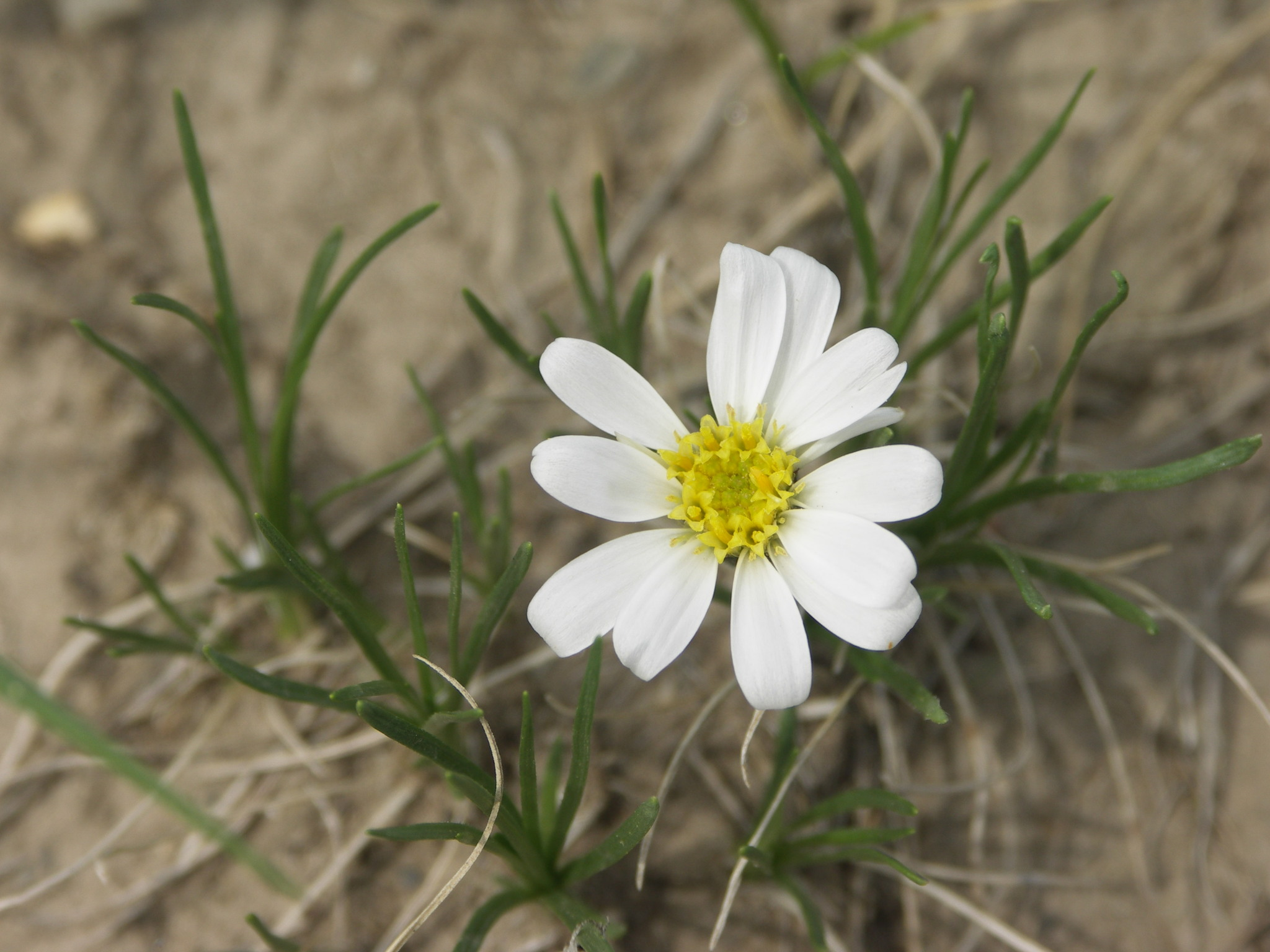

Scientific classification
- Kingdom: Plantae
- Clade: Embryophytes
- Clade: Tracheophytes
- Clade: Angiosperms
- Clade: Eudicots
- Clade: Asterids
- Order: Asterales
- Family: Asteraceae
- Subfamily: Asteroideae
- Tribe: Astereae
- Subtribe: Asterinae
- Genus: Arctogeron; DC.
- Species: A. gramineum

Binomial name
- Arctogeron gramineum (L.) DC.

Synonyms
- Erigeron gramineus L.; Erigeron graminifolius Pall. ex Herder; Erigeron gramineum L.

= Arctogeron =

Arctogeron gramineum

Genus of flowering plants

Arctogeron is a genus of flowering plants in the family Asteraceae.

There is only one known species, Arctogeron gramineum, native to Siberia, Mongolia, and Kazakhstan.
