= Grauanthus =

Scientific classification
- Kingdom: Plantae
- Clade: Tracheophytes
- Clade: Angiosperms
- Clade: Eudicots
- Clade: Asterids
- Order: Asterales
- Family: Asteraceae
- Subfamily: Asteroideae
- Tribe: Astereae
- Subtribe: Grangeinae
- Genus: Grauanthus; Fayed

Type species
- Grauanthus linearifolius (O.Hoffm.) Fayed

Genus of flowering plants

Grauanthus is a genus of African flowering plants in the family Asteraceae.

Species

- Grauanthus linearifolius (O.Hoffm.) Fayed - Tanzania, Kenya
- Grauanthus parviflorus Fayed - Tanzania, Zaire
