= Hypserion =

Scientific classification
- Kingdom: Plantae
- Clade: Tracheophytes
- Clade: Angiosperms
- Clade: Eudicots
- Clade: Asterids
- Order: Asterales
- Family: Asteraceae
- Subfamily: Asteroideae
- Tribe: Gnaphalieae
- Genus: Hypserion; G.L.Nesom

Genus of flowering plants

Hypserion is a genus of flowering plants in the family Asteraceae. It includes five species native to the tropical Americas, ranging from Costa Rica through Panama and Colombia to Ecuador and to Bolivia.

Species are herbaceous non-stoloniferous perennials with erect stems and fibrous roots.

== Species ==
Five species are accepted.

- Hypserion baru (G.L.Nesom) G.L.Nesom – Panama
- Hypserion boliviense G.L.Nesom – Bolivia
- Hypserion major G.L.Nesom – Colombia and Ecuador
- Hypserion minor G.L.Nesom – Colombia and Ecuador
- Hypserion subsericeum (S.F.Blake) G.L.Nesom – Costa Rica
