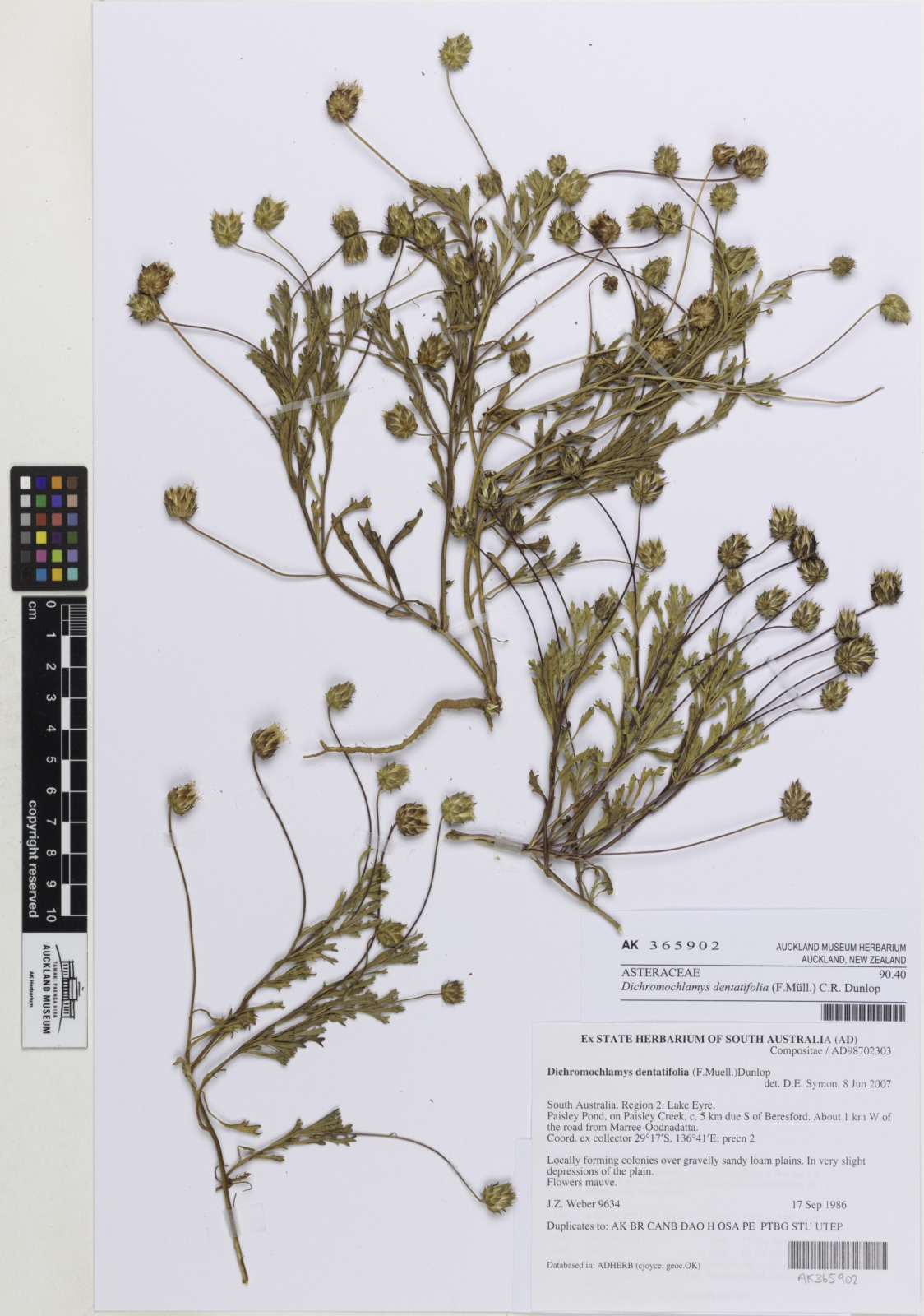

Scientific classification
- Kingdom: Plantae
- Clade: Tracheophytes
- Clade: Angiosperms
- Clade: Eudicots
- Clade: Asterids
- Order: Asterales
- Family: Asteraceae
- Subfamily: Asteroideae
- Tribe: Astereae
- Subtribe: Brachyscominae
- Genus: Dichromochlamys; Dunlop
- Species: D. dentatifolia

Binomial name
- Dichromochlamys dentatifolia (F.Muell.) Dunlop

Synonyms
- Pterigeron dentatifolius F.Muell.

= Dichromochlamys =

Genus of flowering plants

Dichromochlamys is a genus of Australian flowering plants in the family Asteraceae.

There is only one known species, Dichromochlamys dentatifolia, endemic to Australia (New South Wales, Queensland, Northern Territory, South Australia, Western Australia).
