= Pytinicarpa =

Scientific classification
- Kingdom: Plantae
- Clade: Tracheophytes
- Clade: Angiosperms
- Clade: Eudicots
- Clade: Asterids
- Order: Asterales
- Family: Asteraceae
- Subfamily: Asteroideae
- Tribe: Astereae
- Subtribe: Lagenophorinae
- Genus: Pytinicarpa; G.L.Nesom

Species
- 5; see text

Genus of flowering plants

Pytinicarpa is a genus of flowering plants in the family Asteraceae. It includes five species native to Fiji and New Caledonia.

== Species ==
Five species are accepted.

- Pytinicarpa comptonii Gâteblé, Lannuzel & M.Pignal – west-northwest New Caledonia
- Pytinicarpa kaalaensis Lannuzel, Gâteblé & M.Pignal – west-northwest New Caledonia
- Pytinicarpa pickeringii (A.Gray) G.L.Nesom – Fiji
- Pytinicarpa sarasinii (Däniker) G.L.Nesom – west-northwest New Caledonia
- Pytinicarpa tonitrui Lannuzel, Gâteblé & M.Pignal – northern New Caledonia
