= Taimingasa =

Scientific classification
- Kingdom: Plantae
- Clade: Tracheophytes
- Clade: Angiosperms
- Clade: Eudicots
- Clade: Asterids
- Order: Asterales
- Family: Asteraceae
- Genus: Taimingasa (Kitam.) C.Ren & Q.E.Yang

Genus of flowering plants

Taimingasa is a genus of flowering plants belonging to the family Asteraceae.

Its native range is Northeastern China to Korea, Japan.

Species:

- Taimingasa amagiensis (Kitam.) C.Ren & Q.E.Yang
- Taimingasa firma (Kom.) C.Ren & Q.E.Yang
- Taimingasa yatabei (Matsum. & Koidz.) C.Ren & Q.E.Yang
