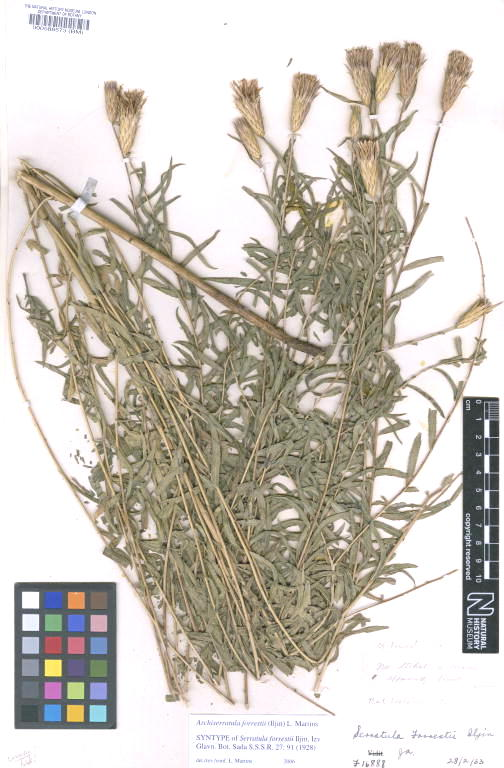
- Archiserratula forrestii

Scientific classification
- Kingdom: Plantae
- Clade: Embryophytes
- Clade: Tracheophytes
- Clade: Spermatophytes
- Clade: Angiosperms
- Clade: Eudicots
- Clade: Asterids
- Order: Asterales
- Family: Asteraceae
- Genus: Archiserratula; L.Martins

= Archiserratula =

Genus of flowering plants

Archiserratula is a genus of flowering plants belonging to the family Asteraceae.

Its native range is Southern Central China.

Species:

- Archiserratula forrestii (Iljin) L.Martins
