= Chamaegeron =

Scientific classification
- Kingdom: Plantae
- Clade: Embryophytes
- Clade: Tracheophytes
- Clade: Angiosperms
- Clade: Eudicots
- Clade: Asterids
- Order: Asterales
- Family: Asteraceae
- Subfamily: Asteroideae
- Tribe: Astereae
- Subtribe: Chamaegerinae
- Genus: Chamaegeron; Schrenk

Type species
- Chamaegeron oligocephalus Schrenk

Genus of flowering plants

Chamaegeron is a genus of flowering plants in the family Asteraceae.

Species

- Chamaegeron asterellus (Bornm.) Botsch. - Iran
- Chamaegeron bungei (Boiss.) Botsch. -Kazakhstan, Uzbekistan, Turkmenistan, Afghanistan, Iran
- Chamaegeron keredjensis (Bornm. & Gauba) Grierson - Iran
- Chamaegeron oligocephalus Schrenk - Pakistan, Kazakhstan, Uzbekistan, Turkmenistan, Afghanistan, Iran
