= Criscianthus =

Scientific classification
- Kingdom: Plantae
- Clade: Tracheophytes
- Clade: Angiosperms
- Clade: Eudicots
- Clade: Asterids
- Order: Asterales
- Family: Asteraceae
- Genus: Criscianthus; Grossi & J.N.Nakaj.

Genus of flowering plants

Criscianthus is a genus of flowering plants belonging to the family Asteraceae.

Its native range is Southern Tropical Africa.

Species:

- Criscianthus zambiensis (R.M.King & H.Rob.) Grossi & J.N.Nakaj.
