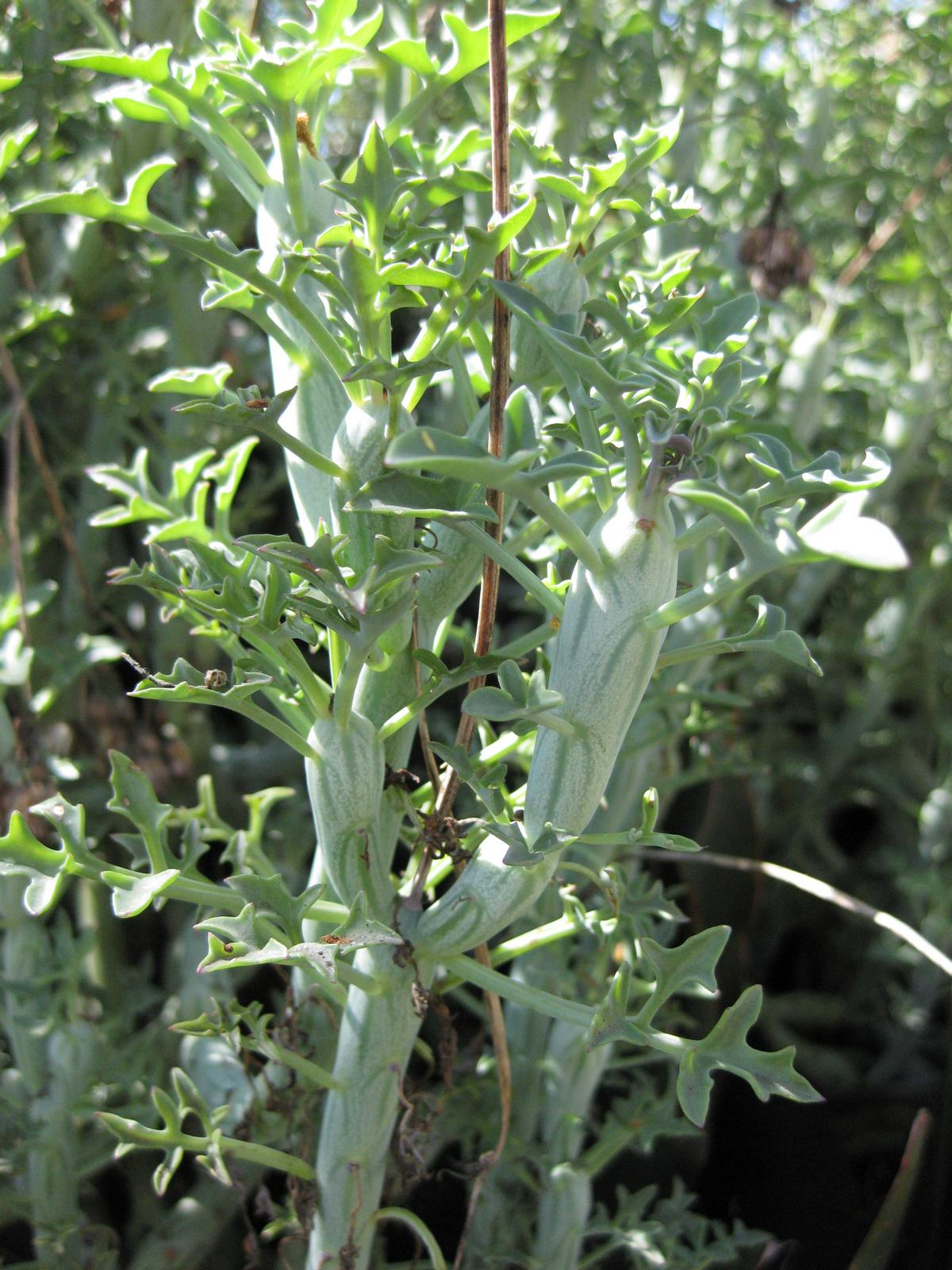
- Baculellum articulatum

Scientific classification
- Kingdom: Plantae
- Clade: Tracheophytes
- Clade: Angiosperms
- Clade: Eudicots
- Clade: Asterids
- Order: Asterales
- Family: Asteraceae
- Genus: Baculellum; L.V.Ozerova & A.C.Timonin
- Species: B. articulatum

Binomial name
- Baculellum articulatum (L.f.) L.V.Ozerova & A.C.Timonin

= Baculellum =

Genus of plants

Baculellum is a monotypic genus of flowering plants belonging to the family Asteraceae. The only species is Baculellum articulatum, and is found in South Africa.
