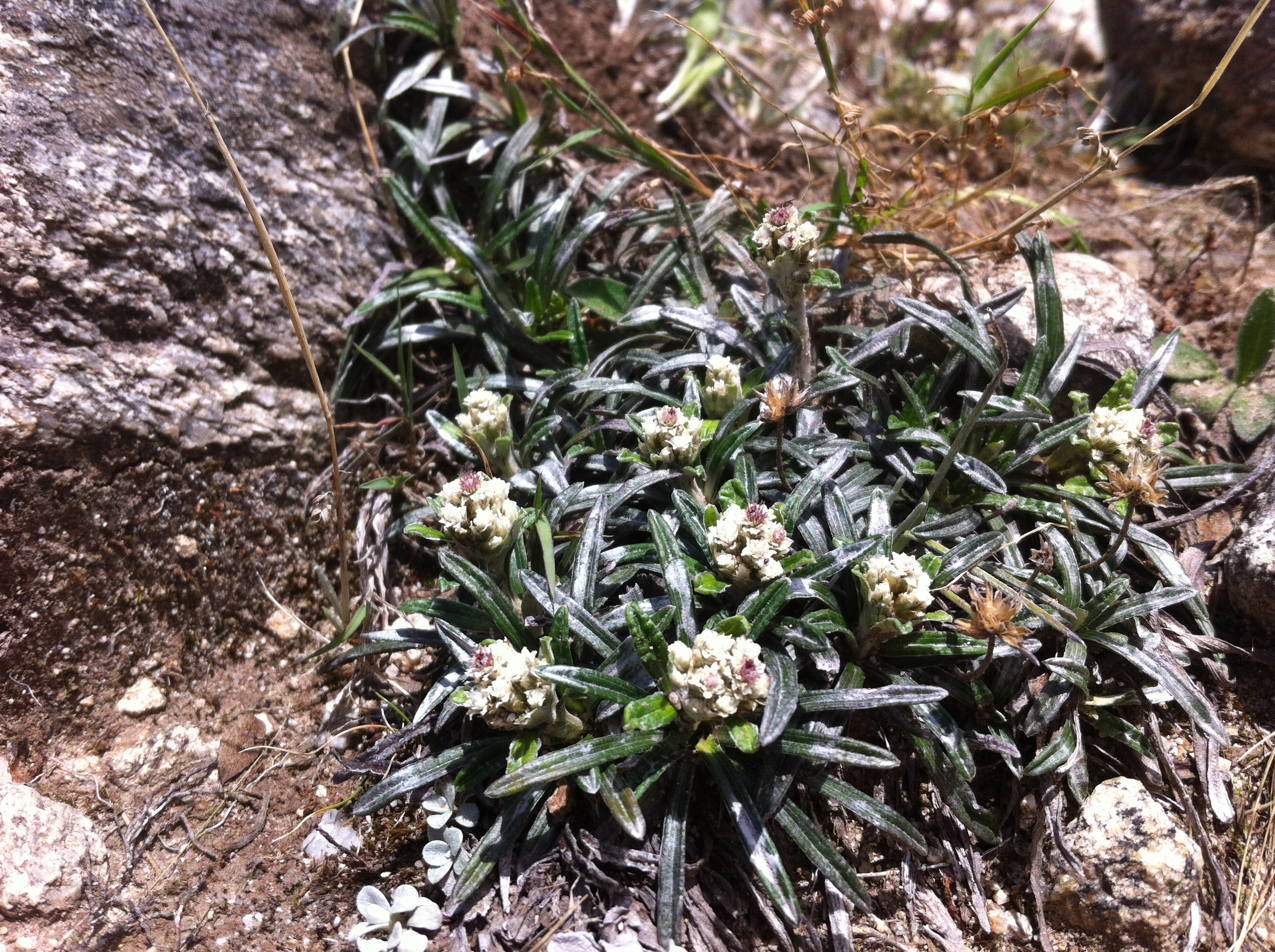

Scientific classification
- Kingdom: Plantae
- Clade: Tracheophytes
- Clade: Angiosperms
- Clade: Eudicots
- Clade: Asterids
- Order: Asterales
- Family: Asteraceae
- Subfamily: Asteroideae
- Tribe: Gnaphalieae
- Genus: Quasiantennaria; R.J.Bayer & M.O.Dillon
- Species: Q. linearifolia

Binomial name
- Quasiantennaria linearifolia (Wedd.) R.J.Bayer & M.O.Dillon

Synonyms
- Antennaria linearifolia Wedd.; Gnaphalium linearifolium (Wedd.) Franch.; Leontopodium linearifolium (Wedd.) Britton

= Quasiantennaria =

Genus of flowering plants

Quasiantennaria is a genus of flowering plants in the family Asteraceae. It includes a single species, Quasiantennaria linearifolia, a perennial native to the Andes of Ecuador, Peru, and western Bolivia.
