= Ortizacalia =

Scientific classification
- Kingdom: Plantae
- Clade: Tracheophytes
- Clade: Angiosperms
- Clade: Eudicots
- Clade: Asterids
- Order: Asterales
- Family: Asteraceae
- Tribe: Senecioneae
- Subtribe: Senecioninae
- Genus: Ortizacalia; Pruski
- Species: O. austin-smithii

Binomial name
- Ortizacalia austin-smithii (Standl.) Pruski

Synonyms
- Senecio austin-smithii Standl.

Genus of flowering plants

Ortizacalia is a genus of flowering plants in the family Asteraceae. It includes a single species, Ortizacalia austin-smithii, a climbing shrub or liana endemic to Costa Rica.

The species was first described as Senecio austin-smithii in 1940 by Paul Carpenter Standley. In 2012 John Francis Pruski placed it in the newly-described monotypic genus Ortizacalia as O. austin-smithii.
