= Batopilasia =

Scientific classification
- Kingdom: Plantae
- Clade: Tracheophytes
- Clade: Angiosperms
- Clade: Eudicots
- Clade: Asterids
- Order: Asterales
- Family: Asteraceae
- Subfamily: Asteroideae
- Tribe: Astereae
- Subtribe: Boltoniinae
- Genus: Batopilasia; G.L.Nesom & R.D.Noyes
- Species: B. byei

Binomial name
- Batopilasia byei (S.D.Sundb. & G.L.Nesom) G.L.Nesom & Noyes

Genus of flowering plants

Batopilasia is a genus of flowering plants belonging to the family Asteraceae. It contains a single species, Batopilasia byei.

Its native range is Northeastern Mexico.
