= Talamancaster =

Scientific classification
- Kingdom: Plantae
- Clade: Tracheophytes
- Clade: Angiosperms
- Clade: Eudicots
- Clade: Asterids
- Order: Asterales
- Family: Asteraceae
- Subfamily: Asteroideae
- Tribe: Astereae
- Subtribe: Baccharidinae
- Genus: Talamancaster; Pruski

Genus of flowering plants

Talamancaster is a genus of flowering plants belonging to the family Asteraceae.

Its native range is Central America, Northwestern Venezuela.

Species:

- Talamancaster andinus (V.M.Badillo) Pruski
- Talamancaster cuchumatanicus (Beaman & De Jong) Pruski
- Talamancaster minusculus (Cuatrec.) Pruski
- Talamancaster panamensis (S.F.Blake) Pruski
- Talamancaster sakiranus (Cuatrec.) Pruski
- Talamancaster westonii (Cuatrec.) Pruski
