= Mtonia =

Scientific classification
- Kingdom: Plantae
- Clade: Tracheophytes
- Clade: Angiosperms
- Clade: Eudicots
- Clade: Asterids
- Order: Asterales
- Family: Asteraceae
- Subfamily: Asteroideae
- Tribe: Astereae
- Subtribe: Grangeinae
- Genus: Mtonia; Beentje
- Species: M. glandulifera

Binomial name
- Mtonia glandulifera Beentje

Genus of plants

Mtonia is a monotypic genus of flowering plants belonging to the family Asteraceae. The only species is Mtonia glandulifera.

The species is found in Tanzania.
