= Dimorphocoma =

Scientific classification
- Kingdom: Plantae
- Clade: Tracheophytes
- Clade: Angiosperms
- Clade: Eudicots
- Clade: Asterids
- Order: Asterales
- Family: Asteraceae
- Subfamily: Asteroideae
- Tribe: Astereae
- Subtribe: Brachyscominae
- Genus: Dimorphocoma; F.Muell. & Tate
- Species: D. minutula

Binomial name
- Dimorphocoma minutula F.Muell. & Tate

Genus of flowering plants

Dimorphocoma is a genus of flowering plants in the family Asteraceae.

There is only one known species, Dimorphocoma minutula, endemic to Australia (New South Wales and South Australia).
