= Delwiensia =

Conservation status
- Vulnerable (NatureServe)

Scientific classification
- Kingdom: Plantae
- Clade: Tracheophytes
- Clade: Angiosperms
- Clade: Eudicots
- Clade: Asterids
- Order: Asterales
- Family: Asteraceae
- Genus: Delwiensia; W.A.Weber & R.C.Wittmann
- Species: D. pattersonii

Binomial name
- Delwiensia pattersonii (A.Gray) W.A.Weber & R.C.Wittmann

Synonyms
- Artemisia pattersonii (A. Gray) W.A. Weber & R.C. Wittmann; Artemisia monocephala (A.Gray) A.Heller; Artemisia pattersonii var. glabrior E.H.Kelso; Artemisia scopulorum var. monocephala A.Gray

Genus of plants

Delwiensia is a monotypic genus of flowering plants belonging to the family Asteraceae. The only species is Delwiensia pattersonii, also known as Patterson sagewort or Patterson's wormwood, and formerly Artemisia pattersonii. The species is found in Western Central USA, growing in the Rocky Mountains of Wyoming, Colorado, and New Mexico.

Delwiensia pattersonii is a mildly aromatic perennial up to 20 cm (8 inches) tall. Leaves are gray-green with fine, silky hairs. Heads are usually borne one at a time but sometimes more, generally nodding (hanging), yellow tinged with red. The species grows in alpine meadows at high elevations over 3500 meters (11,500 feet).
