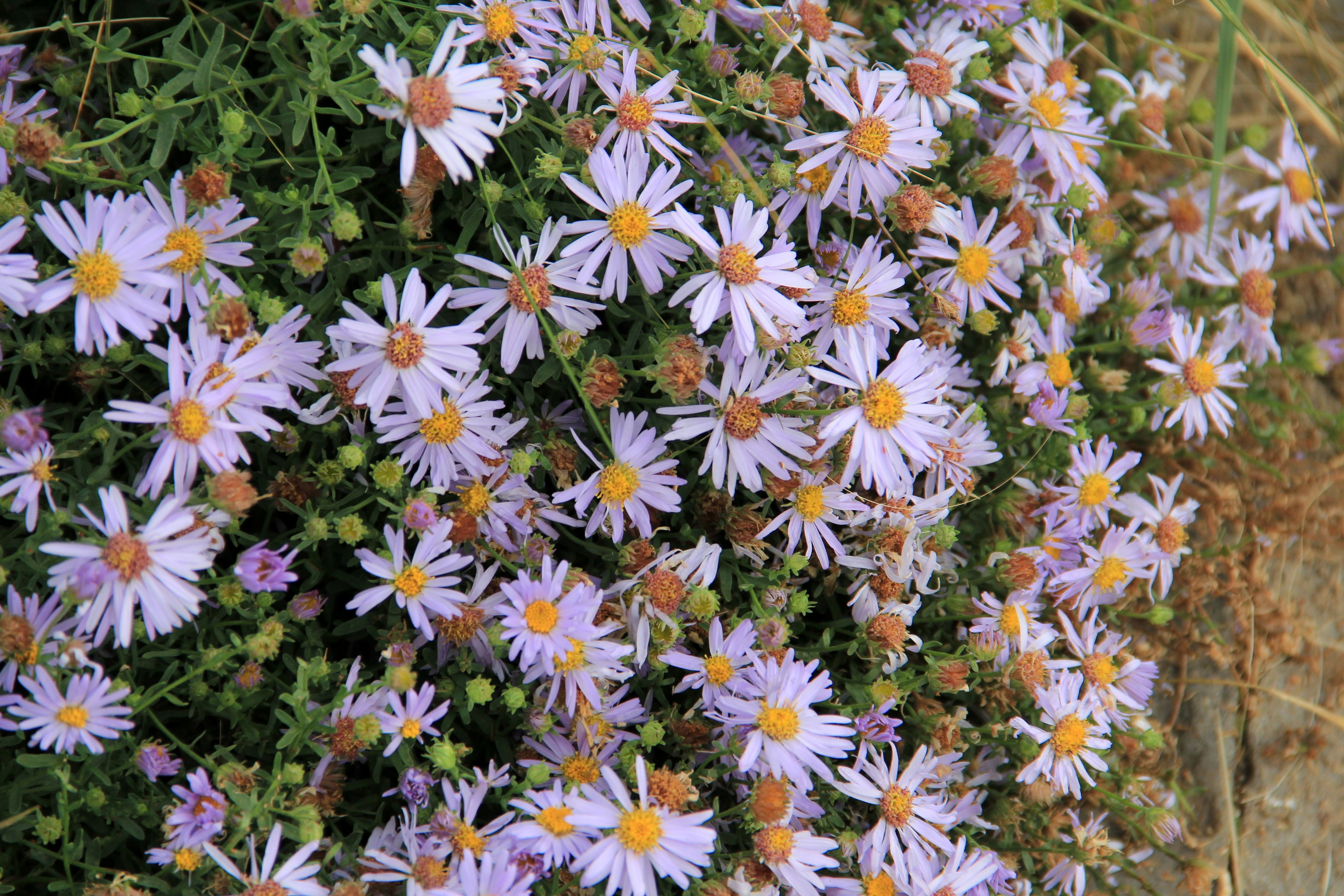

Scientific classification
- Kingdom: Plantae
- Clade: Tracheophytes
- Clade: Angiosperms
- Clade: Eudicots
- Clade: Asterids
- Order: Asterales
- Family: Asteraceae
- Subfamily: Asteroideae
- Tribe: Astereae
- Subtribe: Asterinae
- Genus: Asterothamnus; Novopokr.

= Asterothamnus =

Genus of flowering plants

Asterothamnus is a genus of flowering plants belonging to the family Asteraceae.

Its native range is Central Asia to Southwestern Siberia and Northern China.

Species:

- Asterothamnus alyssoides (Turcz.) Novopokr.
- Asterothamnus centrali-asiaticus Novopokr.
- Asterothamnus fruticosus (C.Winkl.) Novopokr.
- Asterothamnus heteropappoides Novopokr.
- Asterothamnus molliusculus Novopokr.
- Asterothamnus poliifolius Novopokr.
- Asterothamnus schischkinii Tamamsch.
