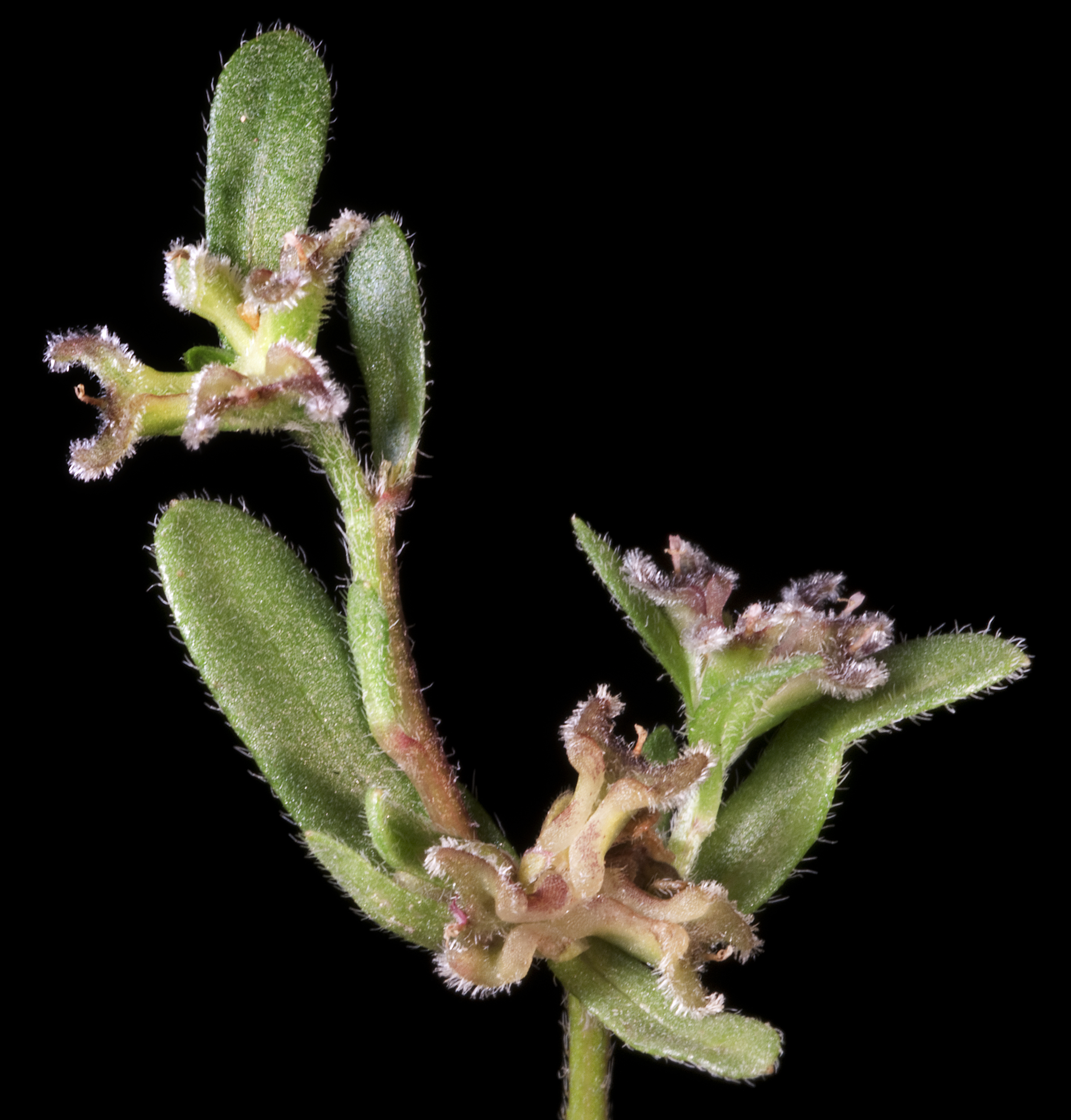

Scientific classification
- Kingdom: Plantae
- Clade: Embryophytes
- Clade: Tracheophytes
- Clade: Angiosperms
- Clade: Eudicots
- Clade: Asterids
- Order: Asterales
- Family: Asteraceae
- Subfamily: Asteroideae
- Tribe: Astereae
- Subtribe: Brachyscominae
- Genus: Ceratogyne; Turcz.
- Species: C. obionoides

Binomial name
- Ceratogyne obionoides Turcz.

Synonyms
- Diotosperma drummondii A.Gray

= Ceratogyne =

Ceratogyne obionoides

Genus of flowering plants

Ceratogyne is a genus of flowering plants in the family Asteraceae.

There is only one known species, Ceratogyne obionoides, which is endemic to Australia, where it is found in Western Australia, South Australia, Victoria, and New South Wales.
