= Archanthemis =

Scientific classification
- Kingdom: Plantae
- Clade: Embryophytes
- Clade: Tracheophytes
- Clade: Angiosperms
- Clade: Eudicots
- Clade: Asterids
- Order: Asterales
- Family: Asteraceae
- Genus: Archanthemis; Lo Presti & Oberpr.

Genus of flowering plants

Archanthemis is a genus of flowering plants belonging to the family Asteraceae.

Its native range is Eastern Europe to Caucasus and Central Asia.

Species:

- Archanthemis calcarea (Sosn.) Lo Presti & Oberpr.
- Archanthemis fruticulosa (M.Bieb.) Lo Presti & Oberpr.
- Archanthemis marschalliana (Willd.) Lo Presti & Oberpr.
- Archanthemis trotzkiana (Claus ex Bunge) Lo Presti & Oberpr.
