= Leucozoma =

Scientific classification
- Kingdom: Plantae
- Clade: Tracheophytes
- Clade: Angiosperms
- Clade: Eudicots
- Clade: Asterids
- Order: Asterales
- Family: Asteraceae
- Subfamily: Asteroideae
- Tribe: Gnaphalieae
- Genus: Leucozoma; T.L.Collins

Genus of flowering plants

Leucozoma is a genus of flowering plants in the genus Asteraceae. It includes five species native to southeastern and eastern Australia.

== Species ==
Five species are accepted.

- Leucozoma boormanii (Maiden & Betche) T.L.Collins
- Leucozoma elatum (A.Cunn. ex DC.) T.L.Collins
- Leucozoma kaputaricum (Paul G.Wilson) T.L.Collins
- Leucozoma lindsayanum (Domin) T.L.Collins
- Leucozoma telfordii (Paul G.Wilson) T.L.Collins
