= Schlechtendalia =

Schlechtendalia is the scientific name for a genus of organisms and may refer to:

- Schlechtendalia (aphid) Lichtenstein, 1883, a genus of insects in the family Aphididae
- Schlechtendalia (plant)
- Schlechtendalia (thrips) Bagnall, 1929, a genus of prehistoric insects in the family Phlaeothripidae
