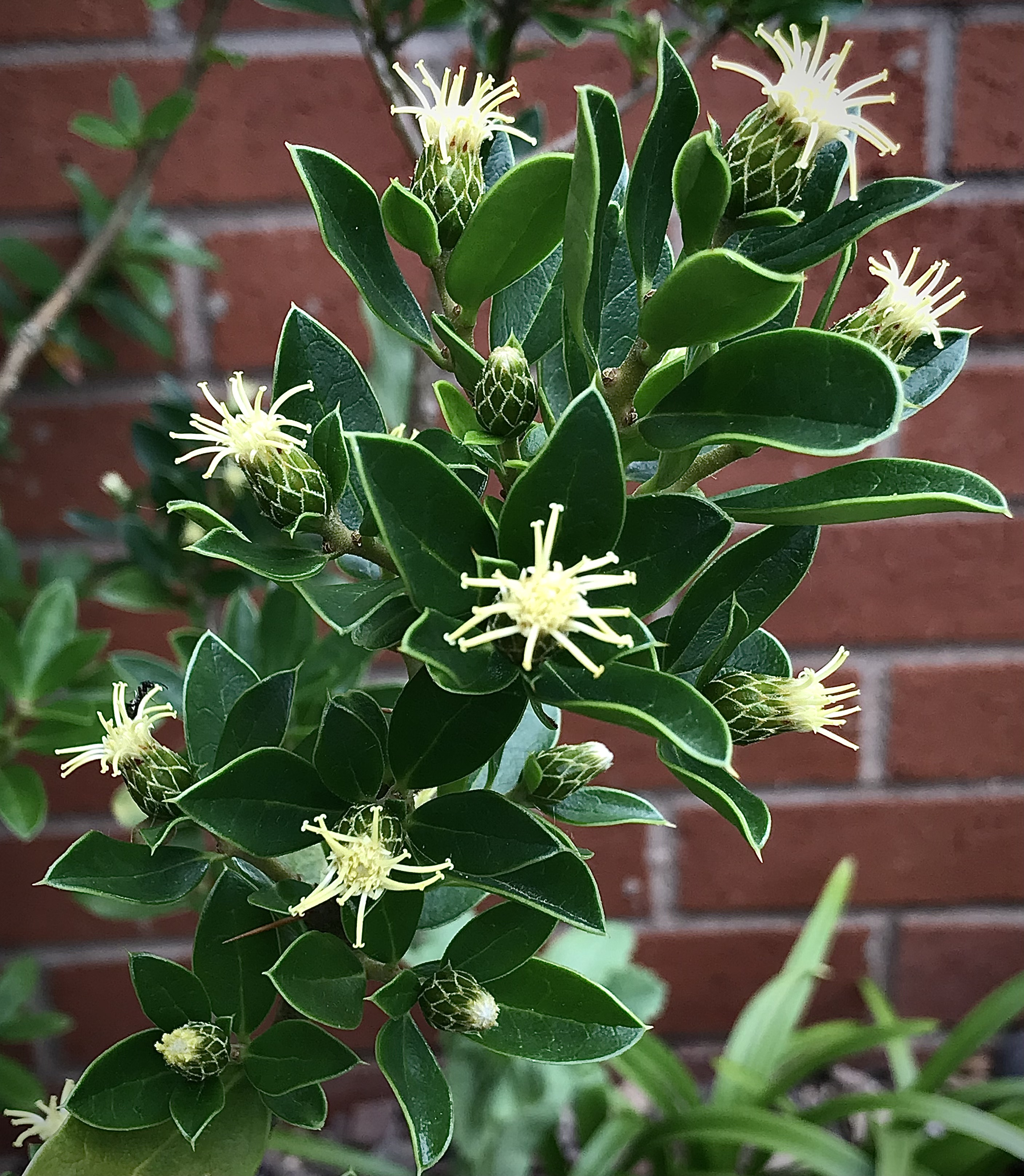

Scientific classification
- Kingdom: Plantae
- Clade: Tracheophytes
- Clade: Angiosperms
- Clade: Eudicots
- Clade: Asterids
- Order: Asterales
- Family: Asteraceae
- Genus: Archidasyphyllum
- Species: A. diacanthoides

Binomial name
- Archidasyphyllum diacanthoides (Less.) P.L.Ferreira, Saavedra & Groppo

Synonyms
- Chuquiraga leucoxylon Poepp. ex Less. Dasyphyllum diacanthoides (Less.) Cabrera; Flotovia diacanthoides Less. Flotovia stifftioides Speg. Piptocarpha diacanthoides (Less.) Hook. & Arn.

= Archidasyphyllum diacanthoides =

Species of plant

Archidasyphyllum diacanthoides, (syn. Dasyphyllum diacanthoides) is a species of flowering plant belonging to the family Asteraceae native to Chile and Argentina. In Chile, it occurs from Curico to Chiloe (35 to 42°S) between 200 and 800 m above sea level. It grows in both moist and shaded sites and more open and arid areas. Common names in Mapudungun are trevo and tayu and in Spanish palo santo ('holy tree') and palo blanco ('white tree').

== Description ==
Archidasyphyllum diacanthoides is an evergreen tree or shrub reaching up to 15 m (50 ft) in height with a trunk which can reach a diameter of over 2 m (80 in). The genus Archidasyphyllum, to which the species belongs, is unusual in being one of the few genera of Asteraceae to include species which are trees, rather than herbs or shrubs. The soft, thin, brown bark is deeply fissured with longitudinal cracks. The glossy, leathery, leaves, dark green above and paler on the underside and borne alternately, are elliptical in shape with entire margins, and acute apices bearing a single, terminal spine. They are 2–6 cm in length and 1-2.5 cm wide, glabrous on both surfaces and pubescent on the margins, the petioles are 1–4 mm in length.

Provided with two thorns (modified stipules), deciduous at the base of the leaves, the flowers are clustered in inflorescences (terminal Flower heads) bearing a superficial resemblance to the hard, scaly flower heads of the familiar, European wildflowers the knapweeds (also members of the Asteraceae). The flowers are white and hermaphrodite, 5 stamens with the anthers attached. The fruit is a cylindrical achene about 3-3.5 mm long and 1 mm wide, pubescent, reddish pappi 5 mm long.

== Etymology ==
The synonymous genus name, Dasyphyllum, is a compound of the Greek elements δασύς ( dasus ) 'hairy' and φύλλον ( phyllon ) 'leaf', while the specific name diacanthoides means 'resembling (Greek suffix -ό-εἶδος (o-eidos) ) plants of the genus Diacantha ', the name of which is a compound of the Greek elements δύο ( duo ) 'two' and ἄκανθα ( acantha ) 'thorn' / 'spine'. The scientific name in its entirety thus means 'the hairy-leaved plant resembling the plant bearing spines in pairs'. [Note: Diacantha is a synonym of the genus Barnadesia - to which the genus Dasyphyllum is closely related.]

== Ornamental use ==
Despite its inconspicuous flowers, of little ornamental value, the plant is occasionally grown as a street tree in urban areas of Argentina, because of its dense crown of evergreen foliage.

== Medicinal use and danger of confusion with Latua ==
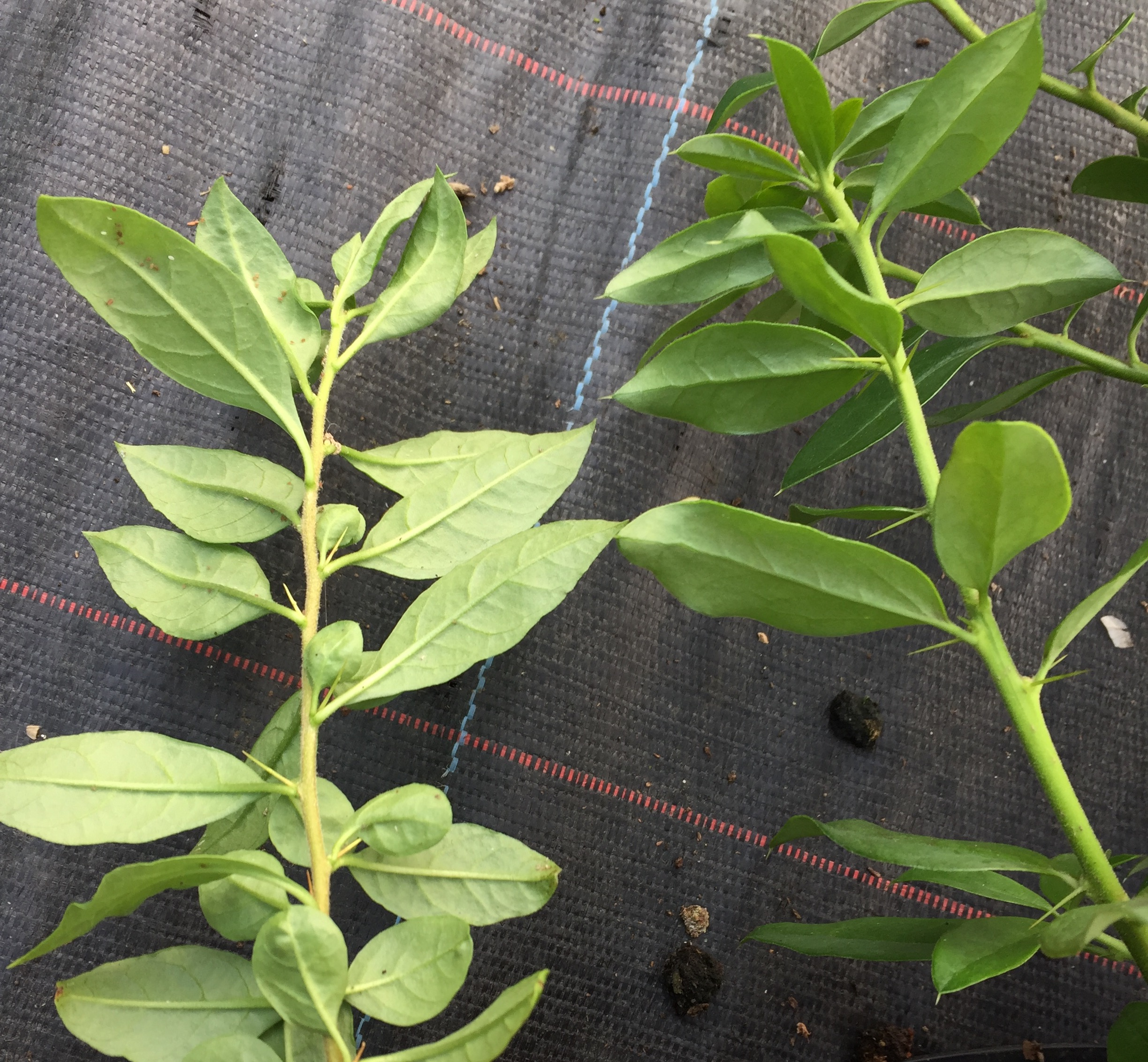
Foliage of young, non-flowering branchlet of Dasyphyllum diacanthoides (on the right) compared with one of the poisonous Latua pubiflora (on the left). Note : 1.) Dasyphyllum stem spines borne in pairs, while Latua stem spines borne singly 2.) Dasyphyllum leaves bear terminal spine not present in leaves of Latua. 3.) Dasyphyllum leaves soon become more leathery than those of Latua as they mature.

The bark of Archidasyphyllum diacanthoides is used in its native Chile as a folk remedy (both topical and oral) for blunt trauma:

Palo santo or Palo blanco (Flotowia diacanthoides) .— It grows from Ñuble to Valdivia. The bark is used against bruises and blows, either by taking it as an infusion or applying it as external use. It also dissolves warts.

When not in flower, however, the plant is easily confused with the highly toxic Solanaceous species Latua pubiflora and this ease of confusion has been responsible for many cases of anticholinergic, tropane alkaloid poisoning by Latua in the Los Lagos Region of southern Chile to which both plants are native.

One of his [ Philippi's informant Señor Juan Renous's ] woodcutters had suffered a strong blow with the blunt end of his axe and went into the forest to get some bark of tayu for it. He took instead latúe [Latua] and drank a concoction of this poison. He became insane almost immediately and wandered into the mountains. He was found three days later in an unconscious state. Several days were required for his recovery, although he suffered severe headaches for several months.

== Winter forage supplement ==
The leafy shoots and young stems offer a nutritional profile in which the energy-to-protein ratio is balanced adequately for cattle fodder. While not utilised as a primary forage source, it forms an important winter forage supplement in the mountain areas of Chile's Araucanía Region, in which good quality forage is of limited availability, due to poor soils and a relatively harsh climate. In sharp contradistinction to many other species belonging to the Asteraceae (e.g. Senecio jacobaea), the plant does not synthesise any toxic alkaloids, being completely safe for consumption by cattle.

== Chemistry ==
The unusual Asteraceae subfamily Barnadesioideae, to which the genus Archidasyphyllum belongs, has yielded phenolic compounds, flavonoids and triterpenoids.

== Gallery ==
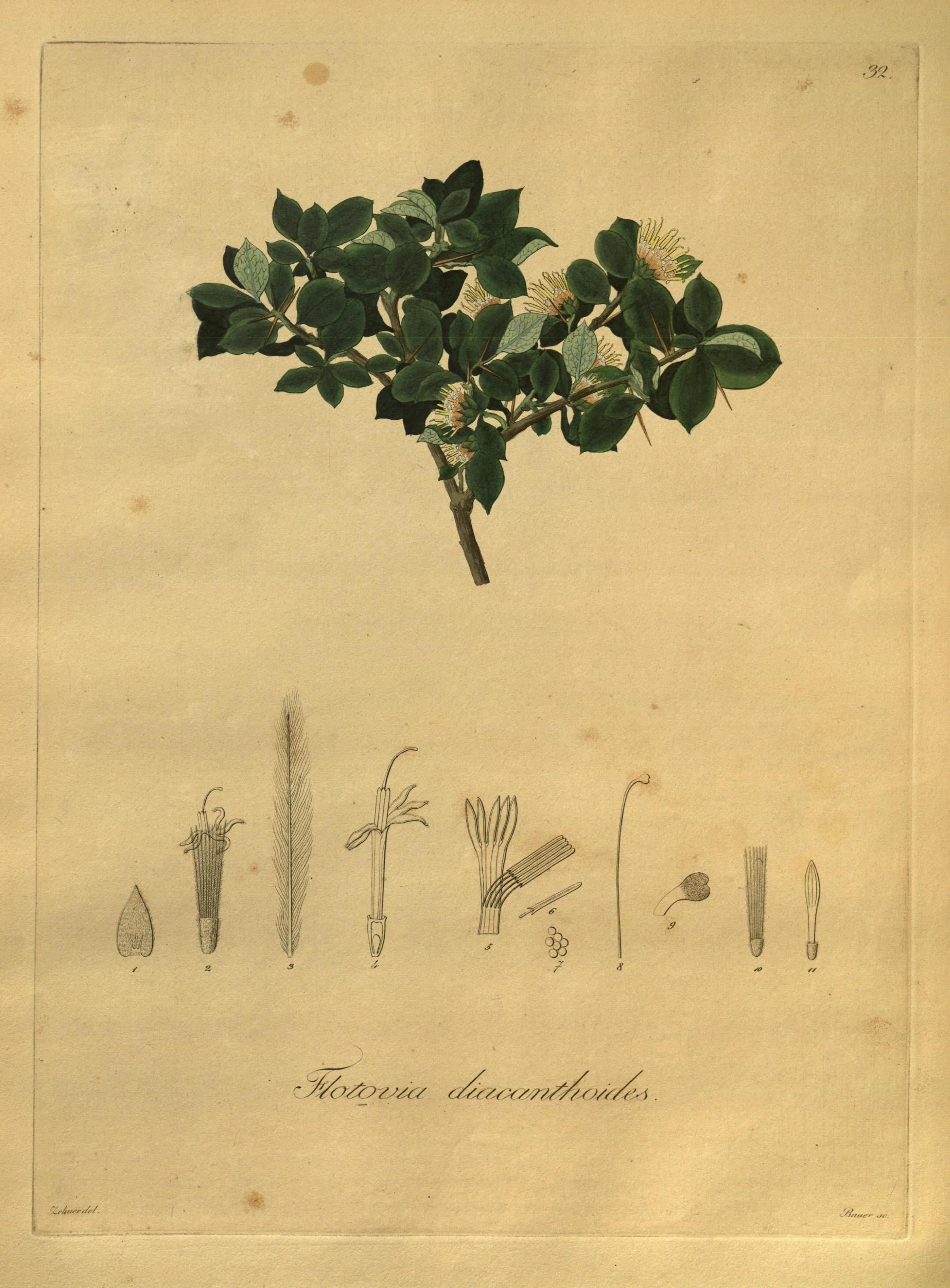
Coloured plate (under older name of Flotovia diacanthoides) from botanical work on Chilean plants by Poeppig and Endlicher

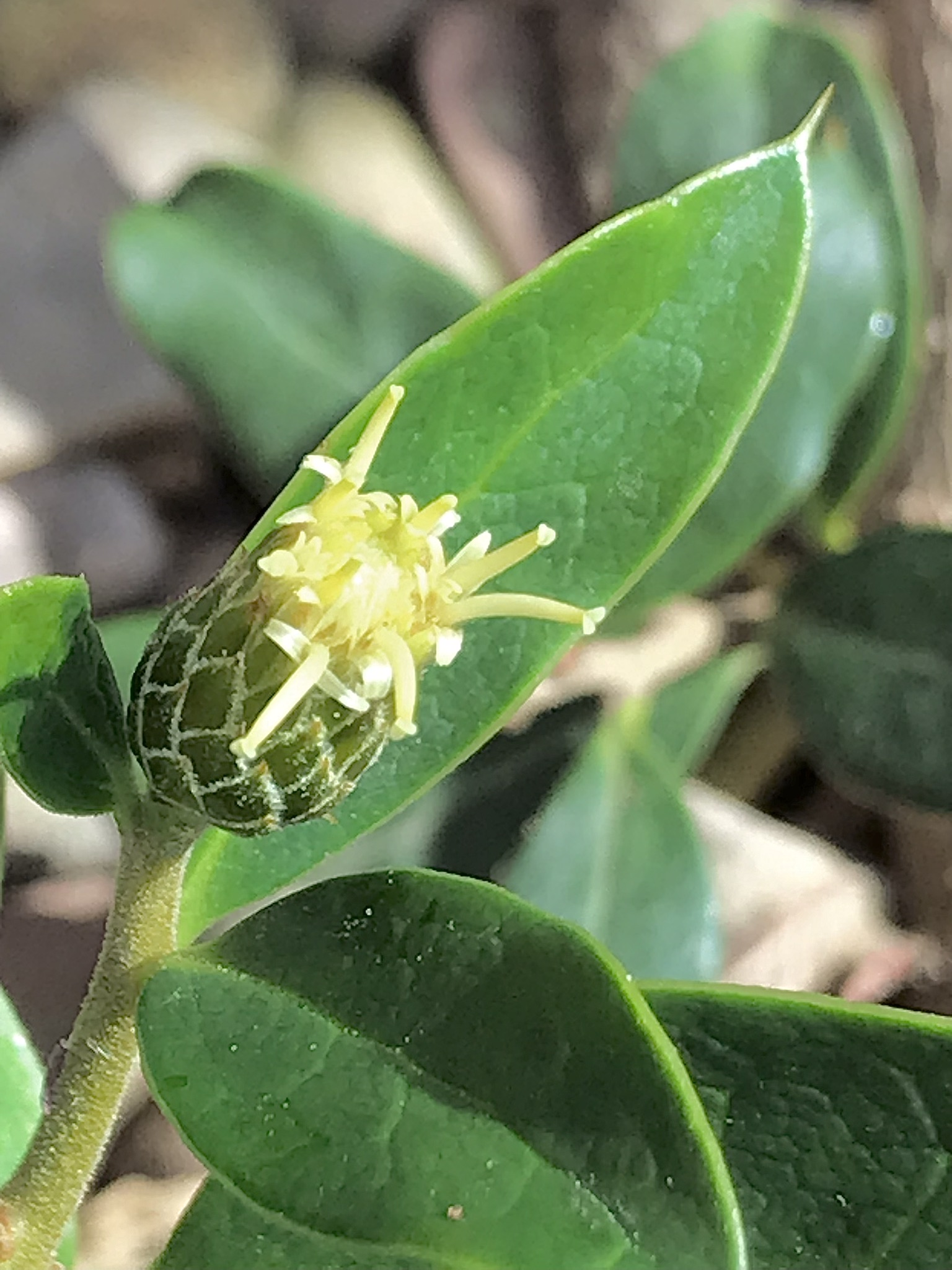
Single, knapweed-like inflorescence.

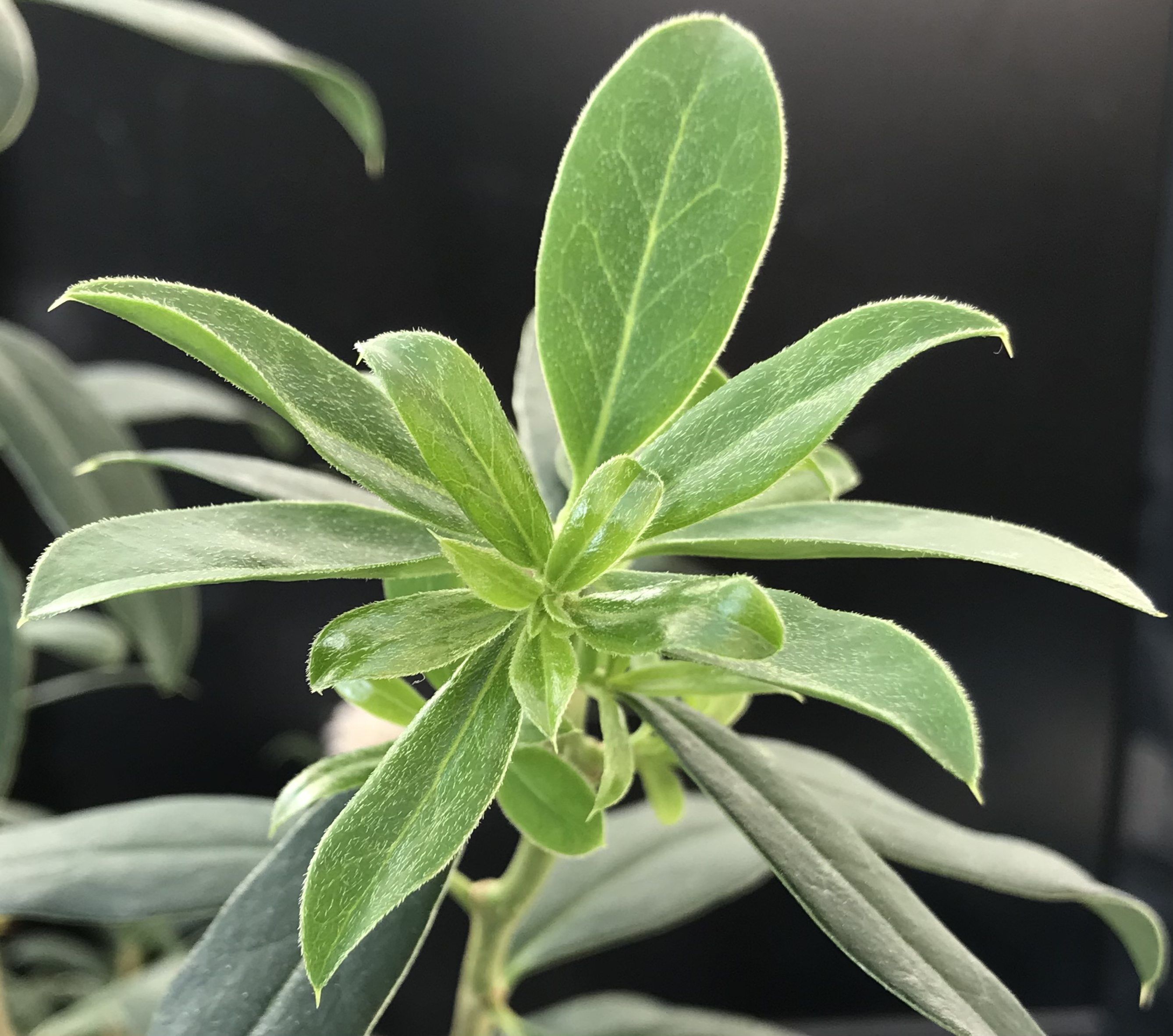
Young, non-flowering, Autumn shoot showing hairiness of young foliage - as described in Greek-derived genus name

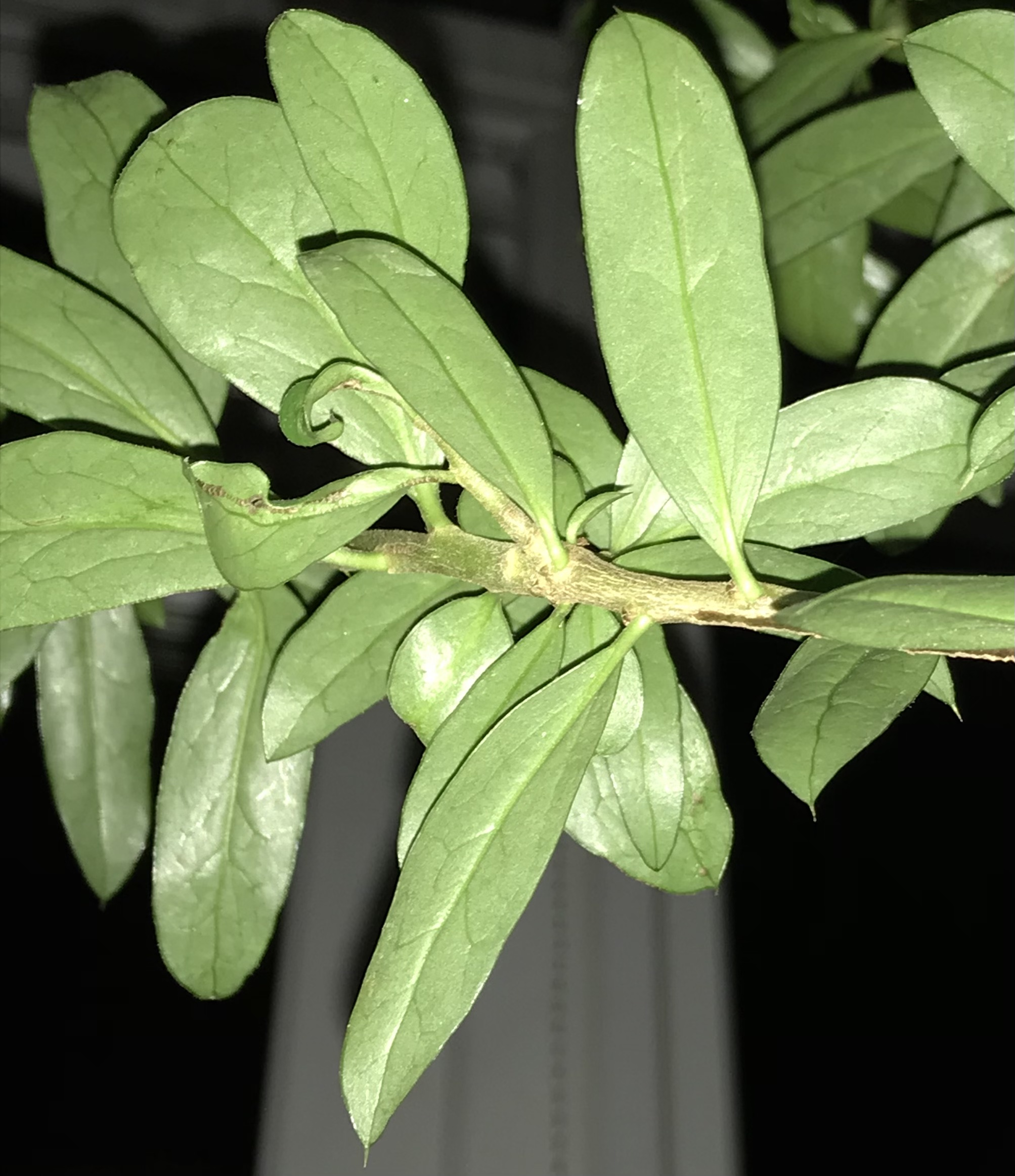
Undersides of leathery, mature leaves, showing terminal spines and characteristic venation

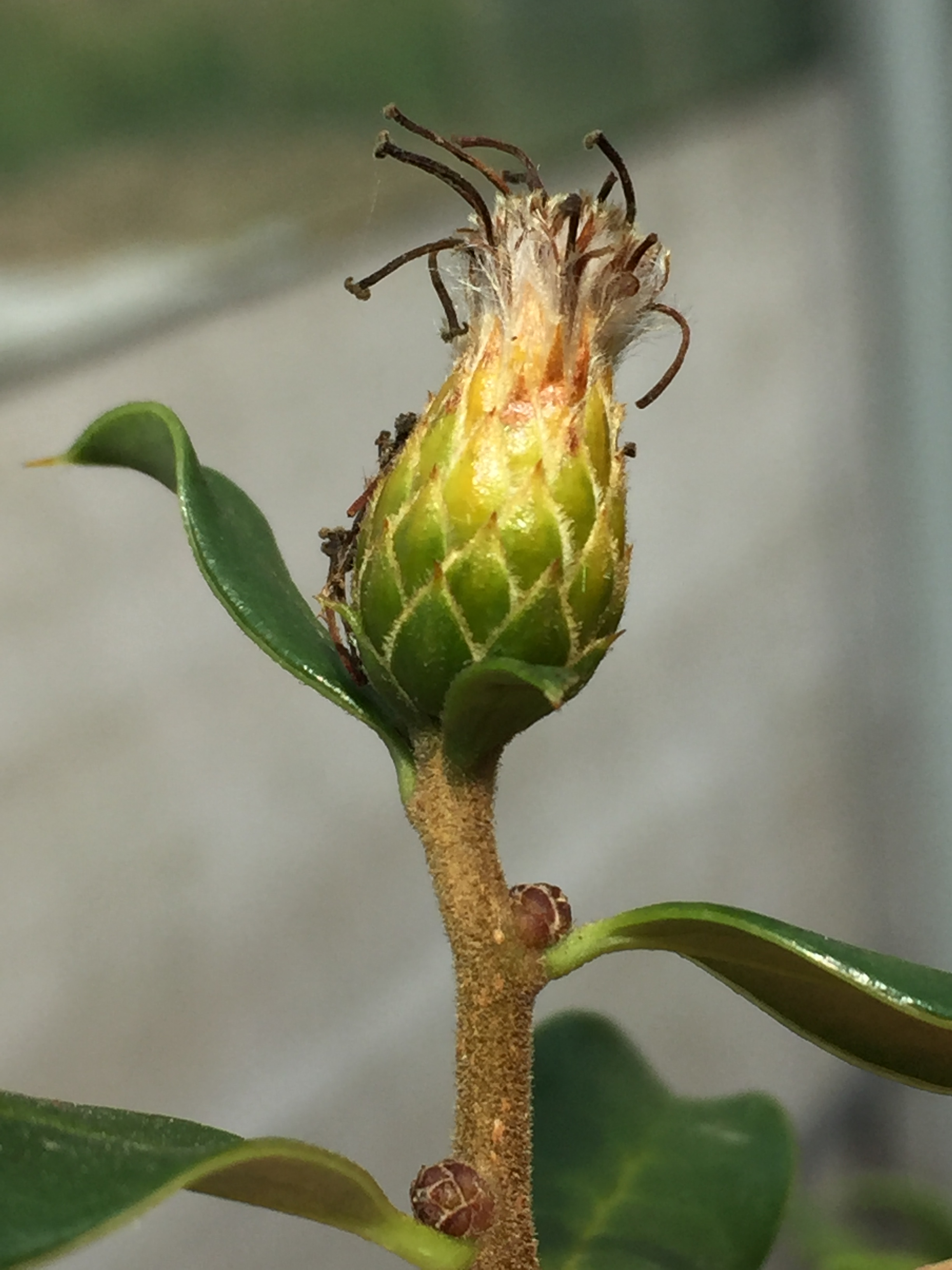
Young infructescence, showing withered, brown florets

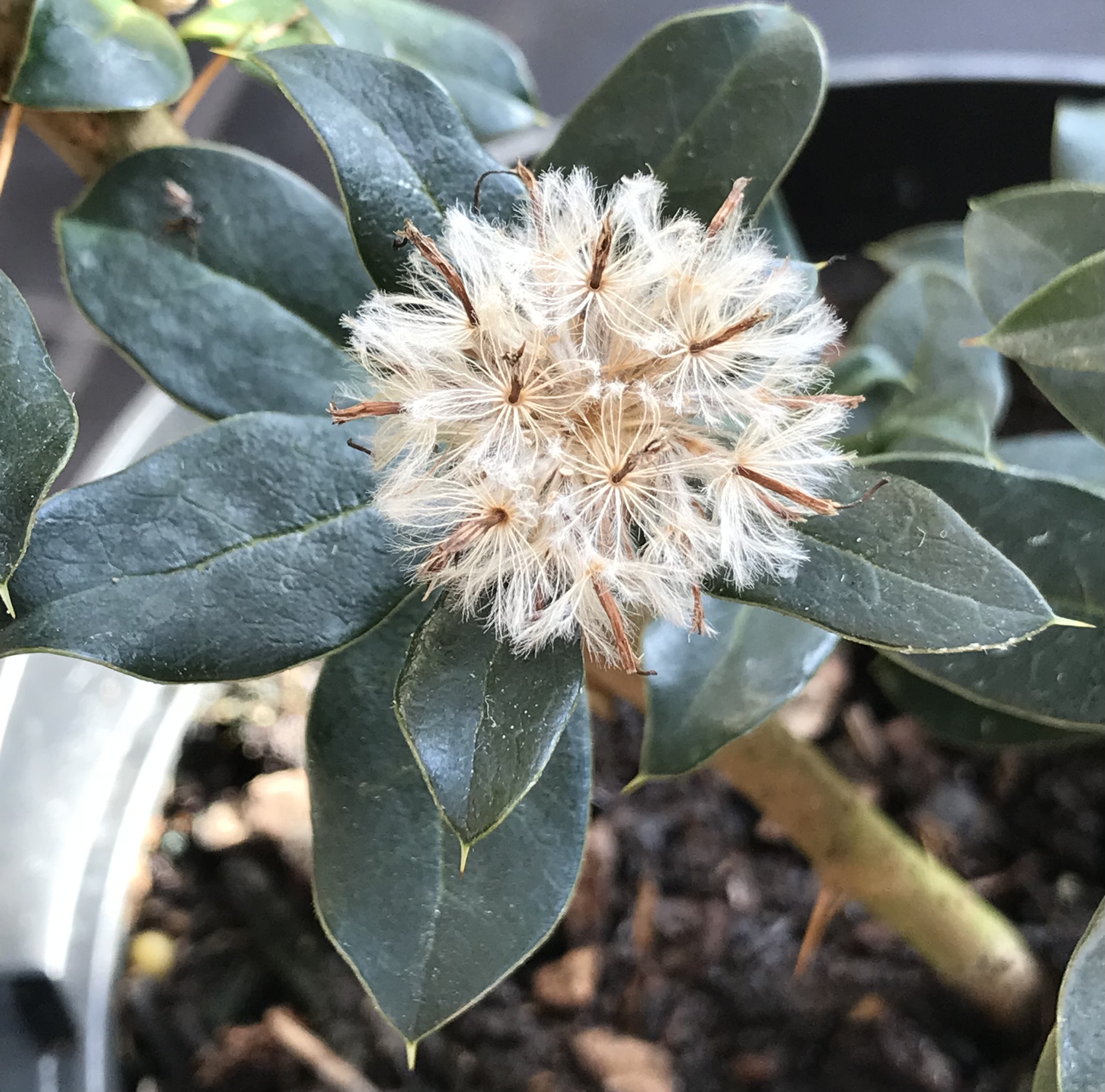
Fruiting shoot: infructescence open to reveal pappus-tufted fruits ready for wind-dispersal

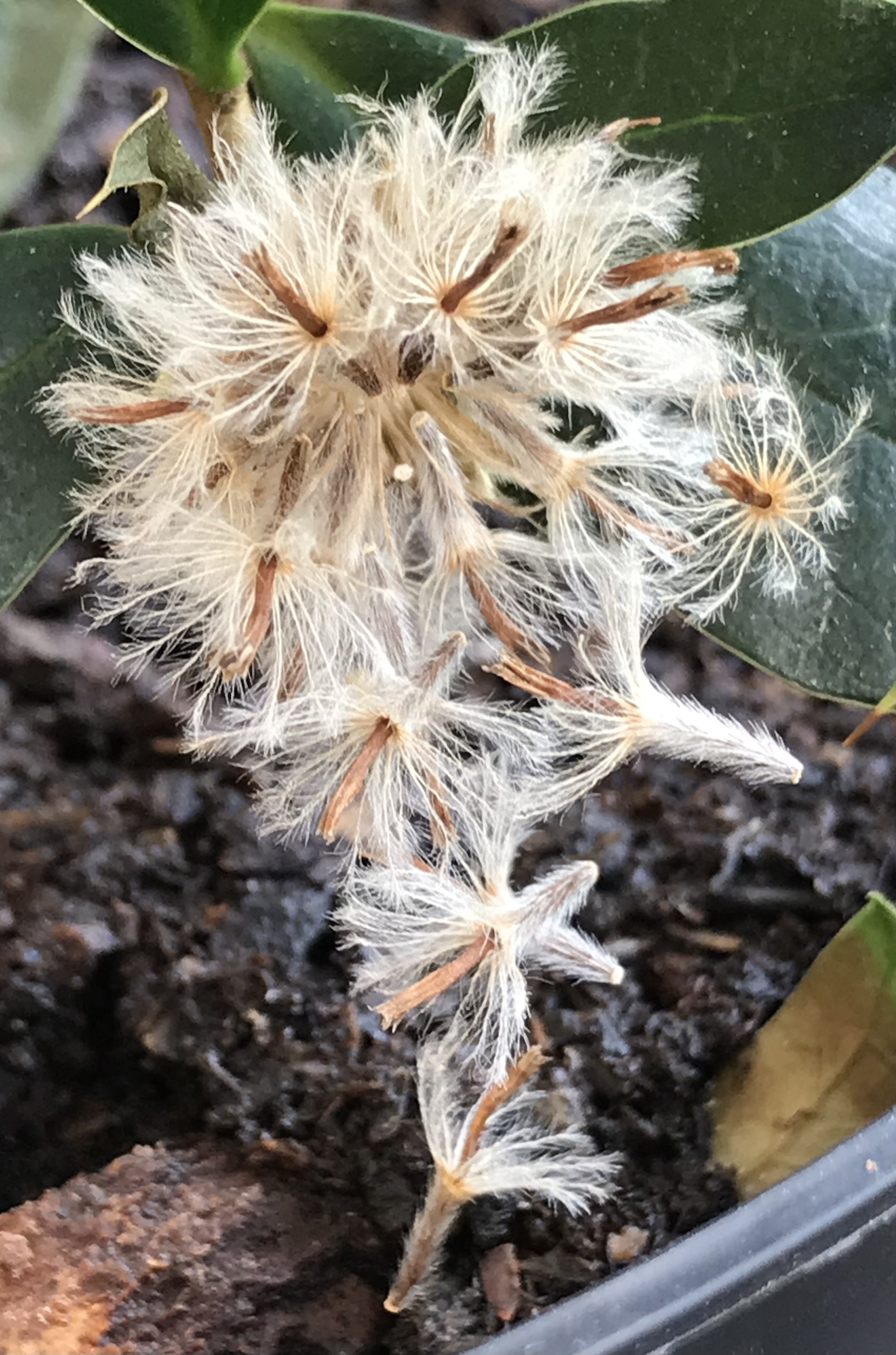
Pappus-tufted fruits starting to be dispersed by the wind

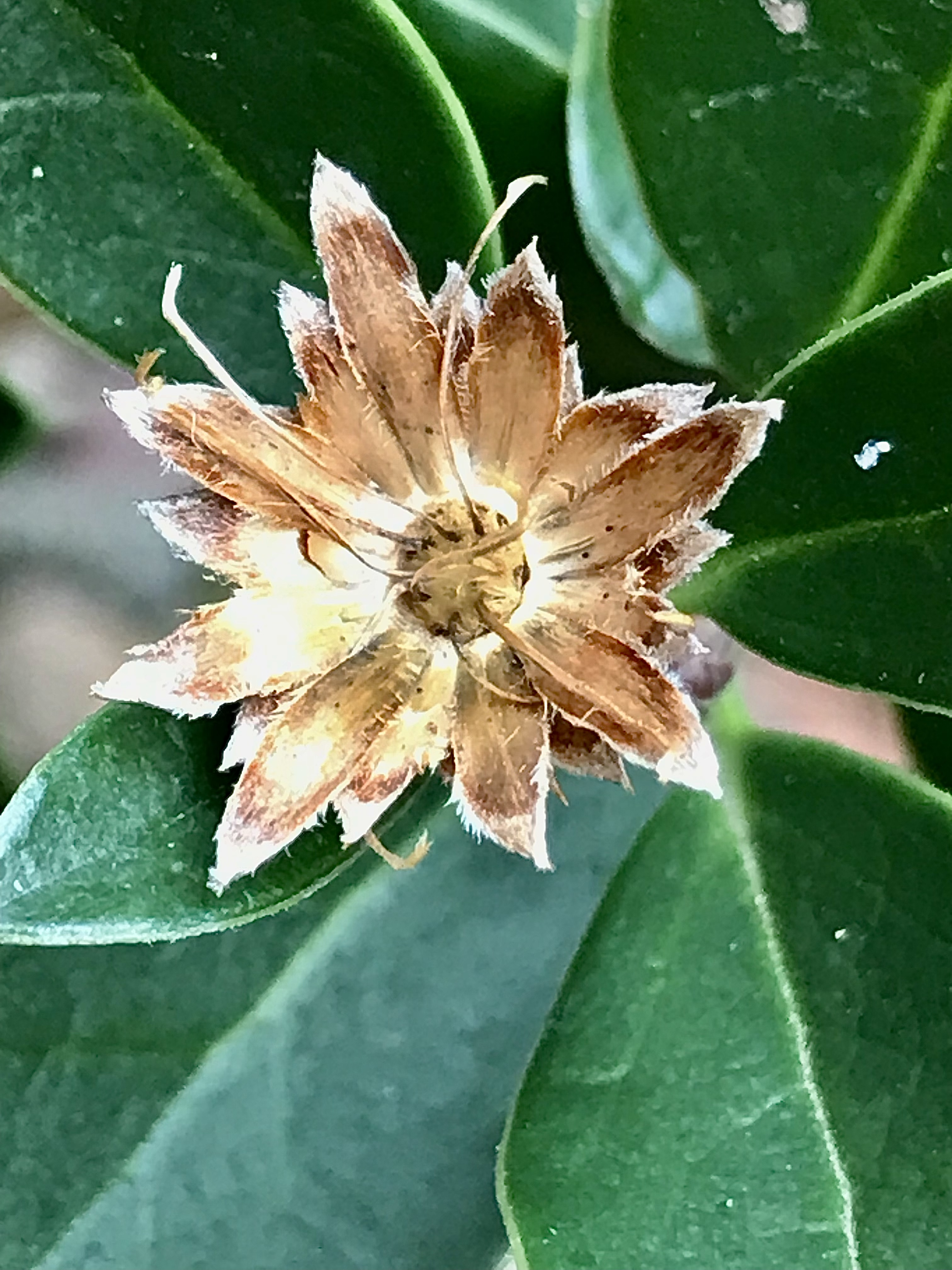
Empty involucre of hairy, brown bracts after wind dispersal of all pappus-tufted fruits

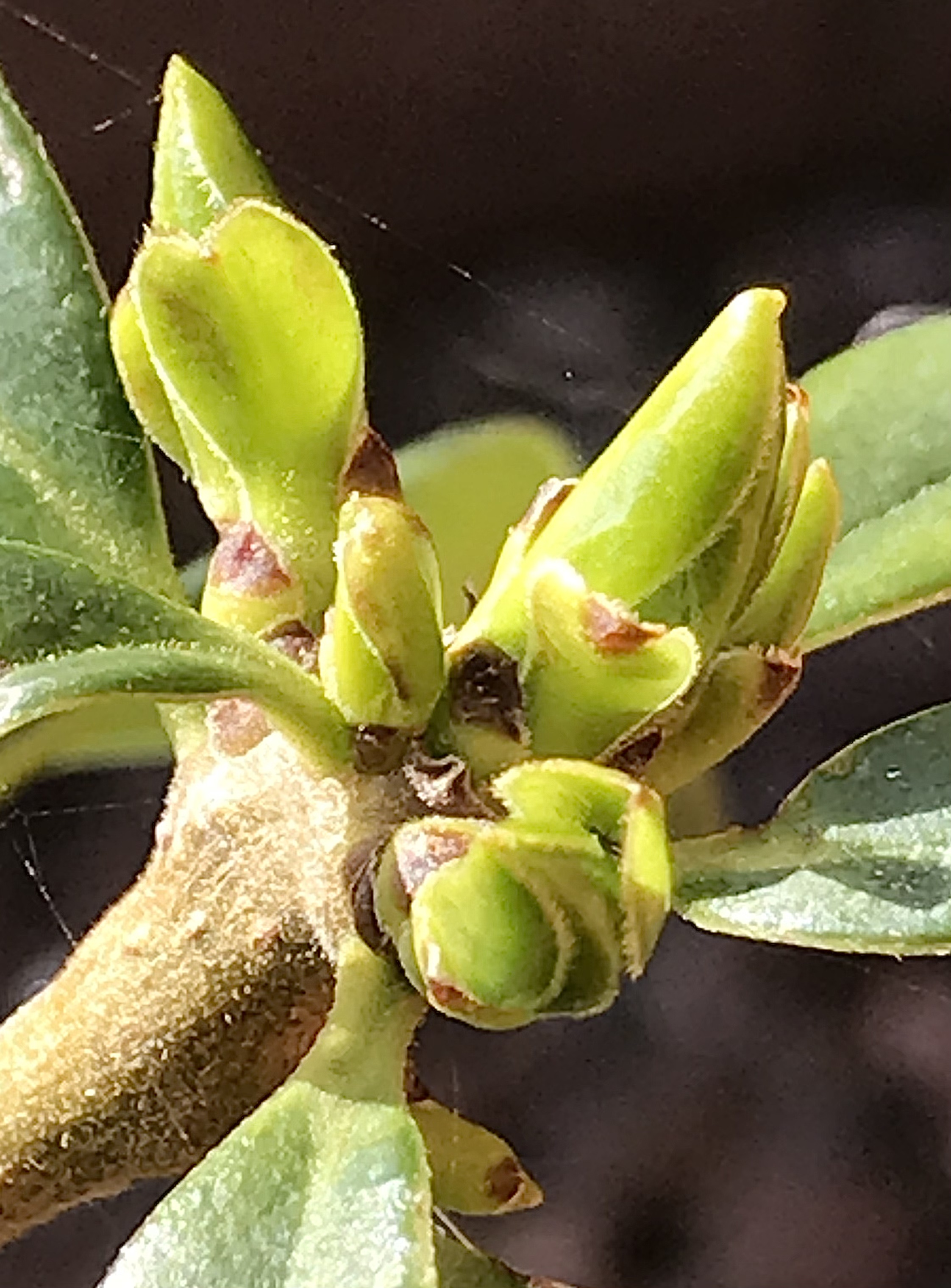
Bursting Spring leaf buds of flowering shoots

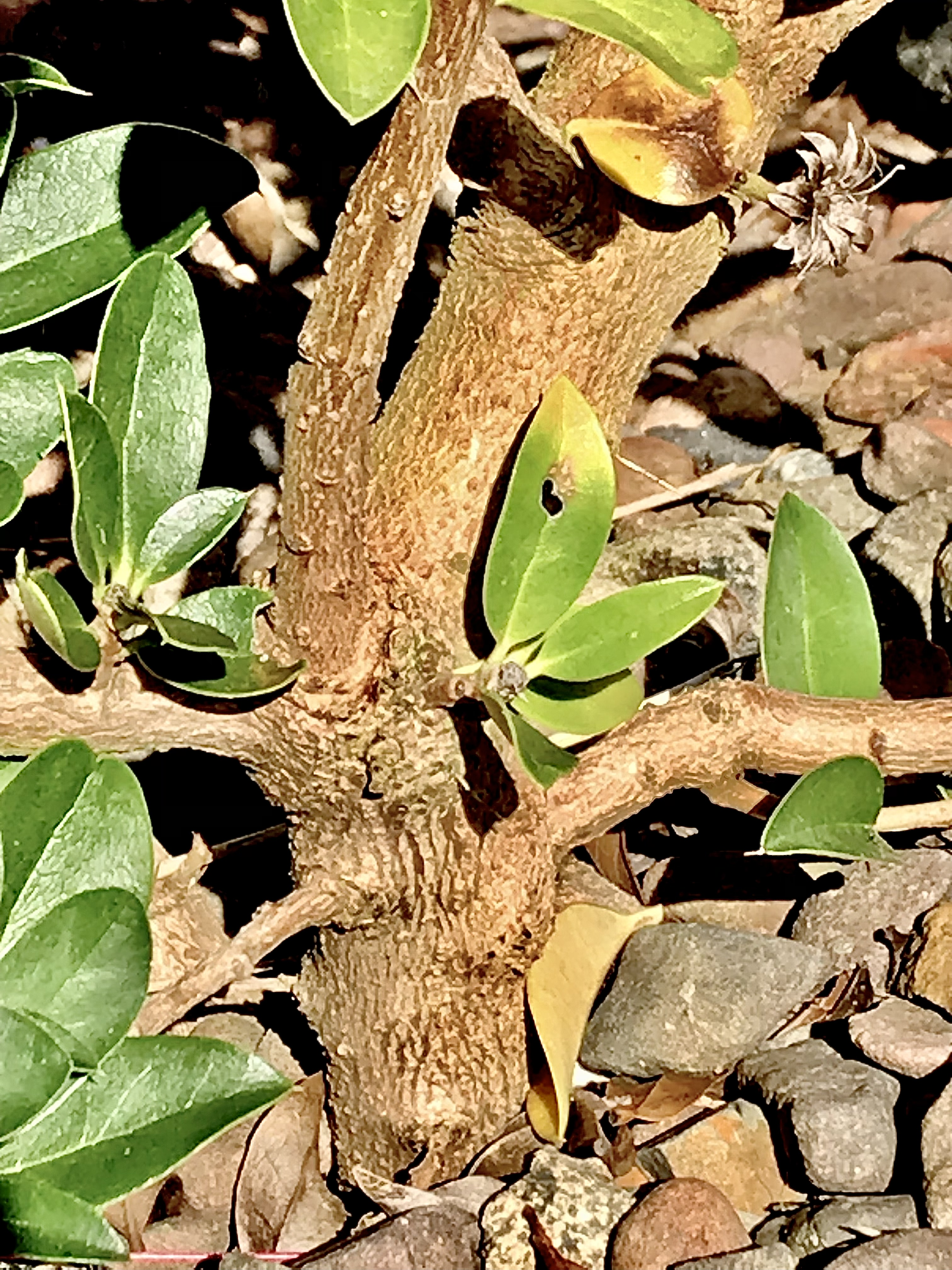
Main trunk (circa 1 cm diameter) of young (circa 5yrs) cultivated shrub. Note remains of cauliflorous infructescence (top right)

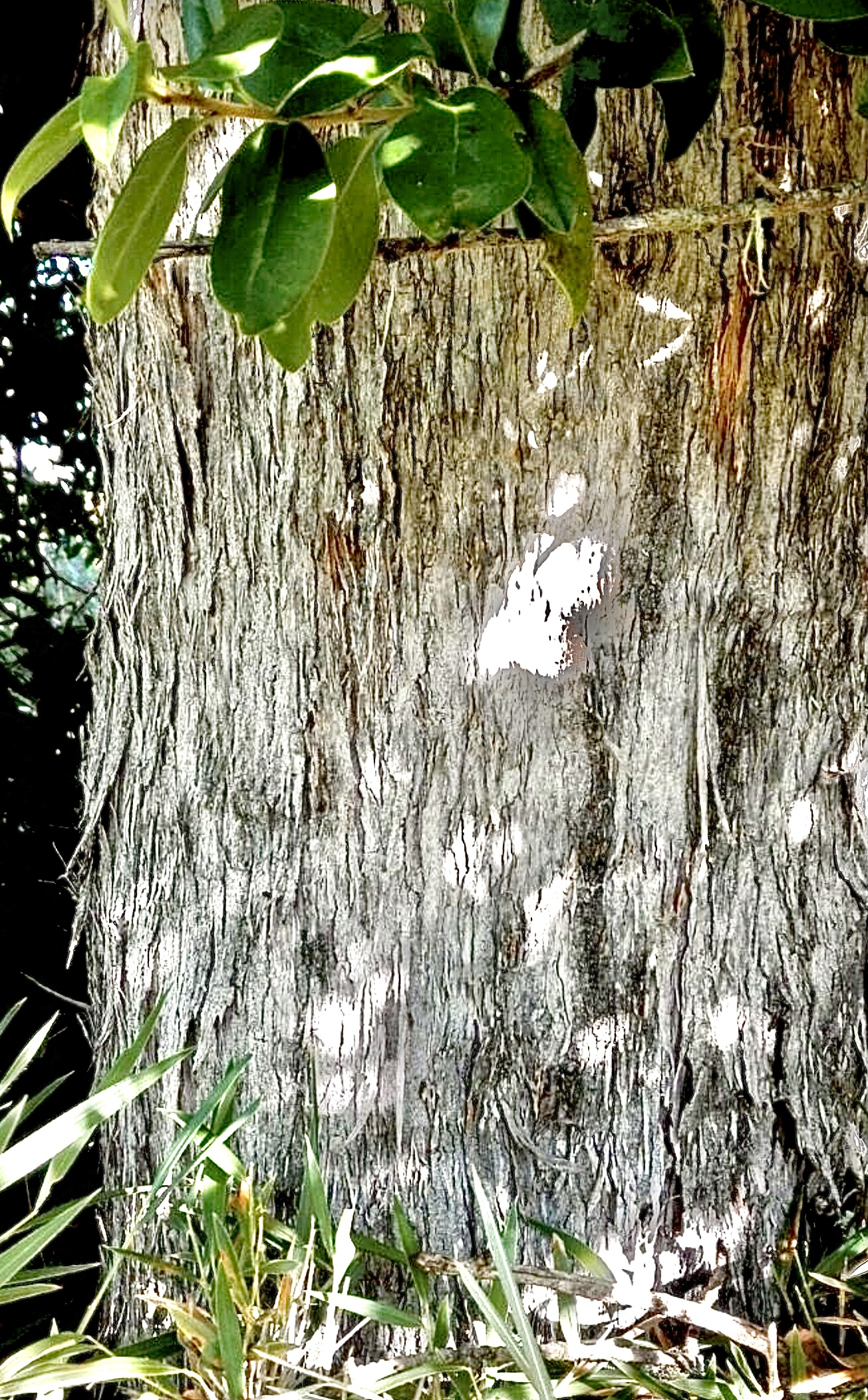
Peeling bark of mature trunk of full-grown arborescent specimen, (circa 9m)
Curacautín, Chile

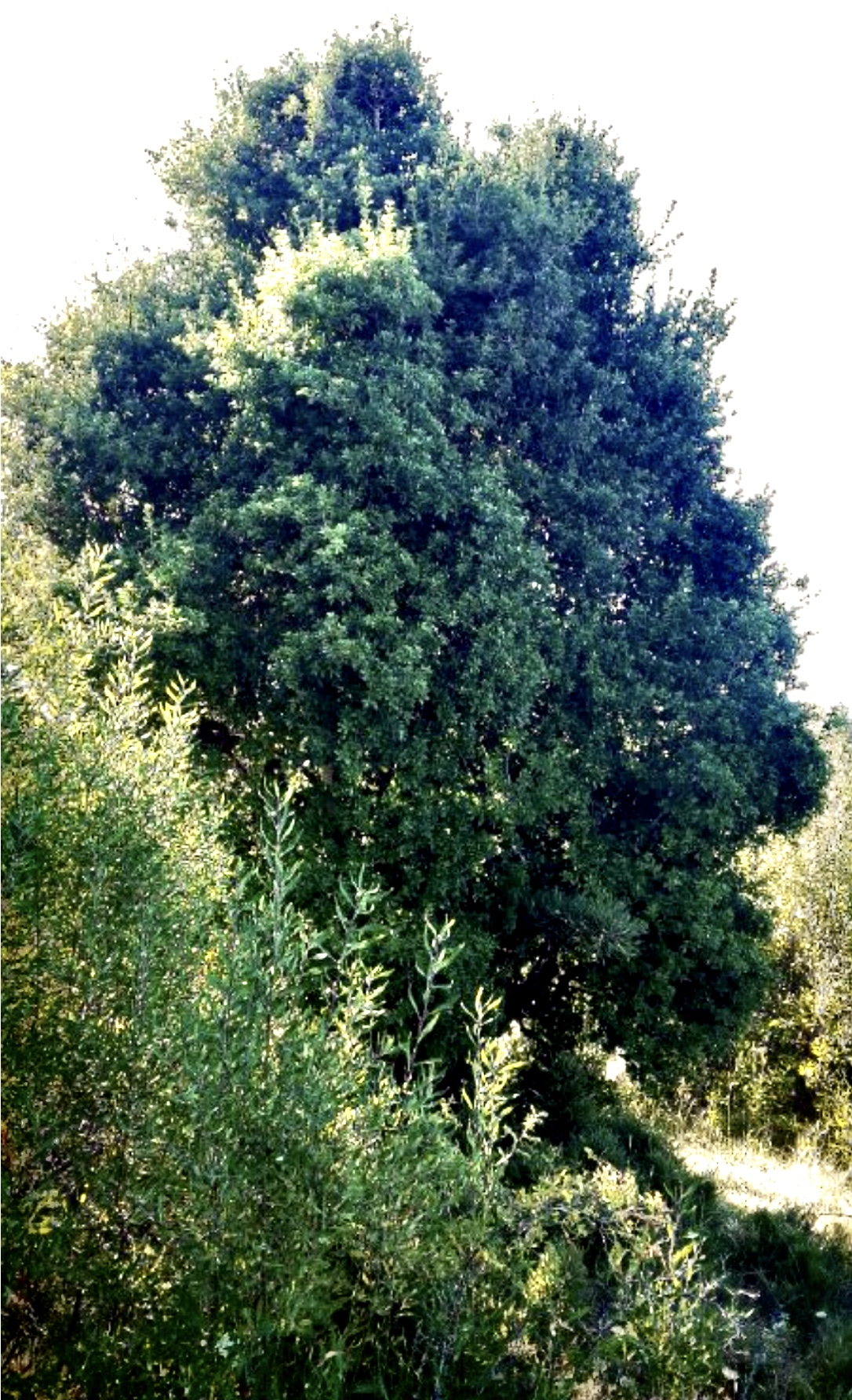
Crown of full-grown arborescent specimen growing in Curacautín, Chile
