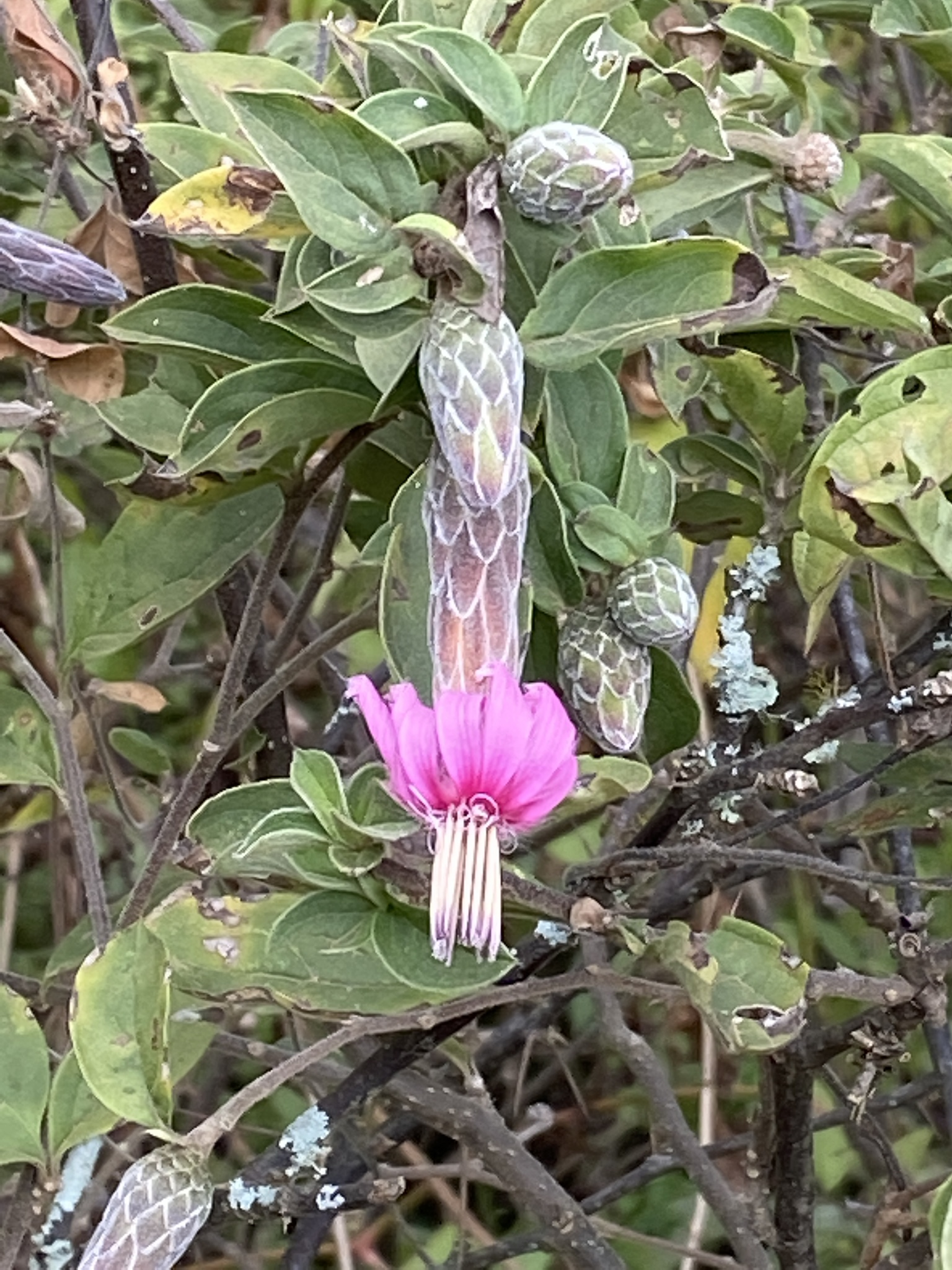

Conservation status
- Vulnerable (IUCN 3.1)

Scientific classification
- Kingdom: Plantae
- Clade: Tracheophytes
- Clade: Angiosperms
- Clade: Eudicots
- Clade: Asterids
- Order: Asterales
- Family: Asteraceae
- Genus: Barnadesia
- Species: B. aculeata

Binomial name
- Barnadesia aculeata (Benth.) I.C.Chung

= Barnadesia aculeata =

Species of flowering plant

Barnadesia aculeata is a species of flowering plant in the family Asteraceae. It is endemic to Ecuador, where it occurs in the central Andes. It grows in mountain shrubland above 2000 meters in elevation. It is vulnerable to habitat destruction.
