= Dasyphyllum argenteum =

Conservation status
- Vulnerable (IUCN 3.1)

Scientific classification
- Kingdom: Plantae
- Clade: Embryophytes
- Clade: Tracheophytes
- Clade: Angiosperms
- Clade: Eudicots
- Clade: Asterids
- Order: Asterales
- Family: Asteraceae
- Genus: Dasyphyllum
- Species: D. argenteum

Binomial name
- Dasyphyllum argenteum Kunth

Species of flowering plant

Dasyphyllum argenteum is a species of flowering plant in the family Asteraceae. It is found only in Ecuador. Its natural habitat is subtropical or tropical moist montane forests. It is threatened by habitat loss. It can be found in the high Andean forest (2,500–3,500 m).
