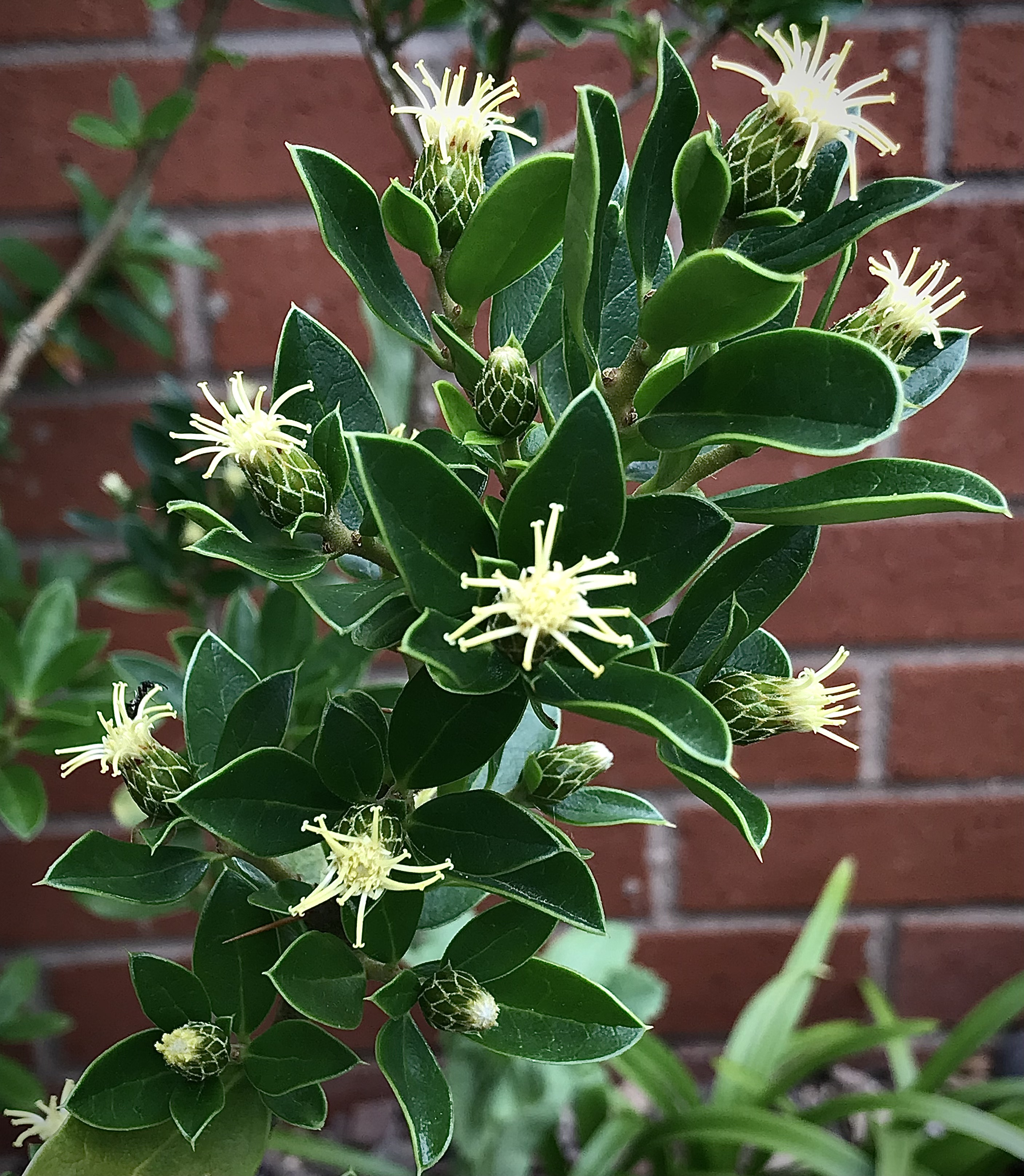
- Archidasyphyllum diacanthoides

Scientific classification
- Kingdom: Plantae
- Clade: Tracheophytes
- Clade: Angiosperms
- Clade: Eudicots
- Clade: Asterids
- Order: Asterales
- Family: Asteraceae
- Subfamily: Barnadesioideae
- Tribe: Barnadesieae
- Genus: Archidasyphyllum (Cabrera) P.L.Ferreira, Saavedra & Groppo

= Archidasyphyllum =

Genus of flowering plants

Archidasyphyllum is a genus of flowering plants belonging to subfamily Barnadesioideae of the family Asteraceae.

Its native range is Central and Southern Chile to Southern Argentina.

Species:

- Archidasyphyllum diacanthoides (Less.) P.L.Ferreira, Saavedra & Groppo
- Archidasyphyllum excelsum (D.Don) P.L.Ferreira, Saavedra & Groppo
