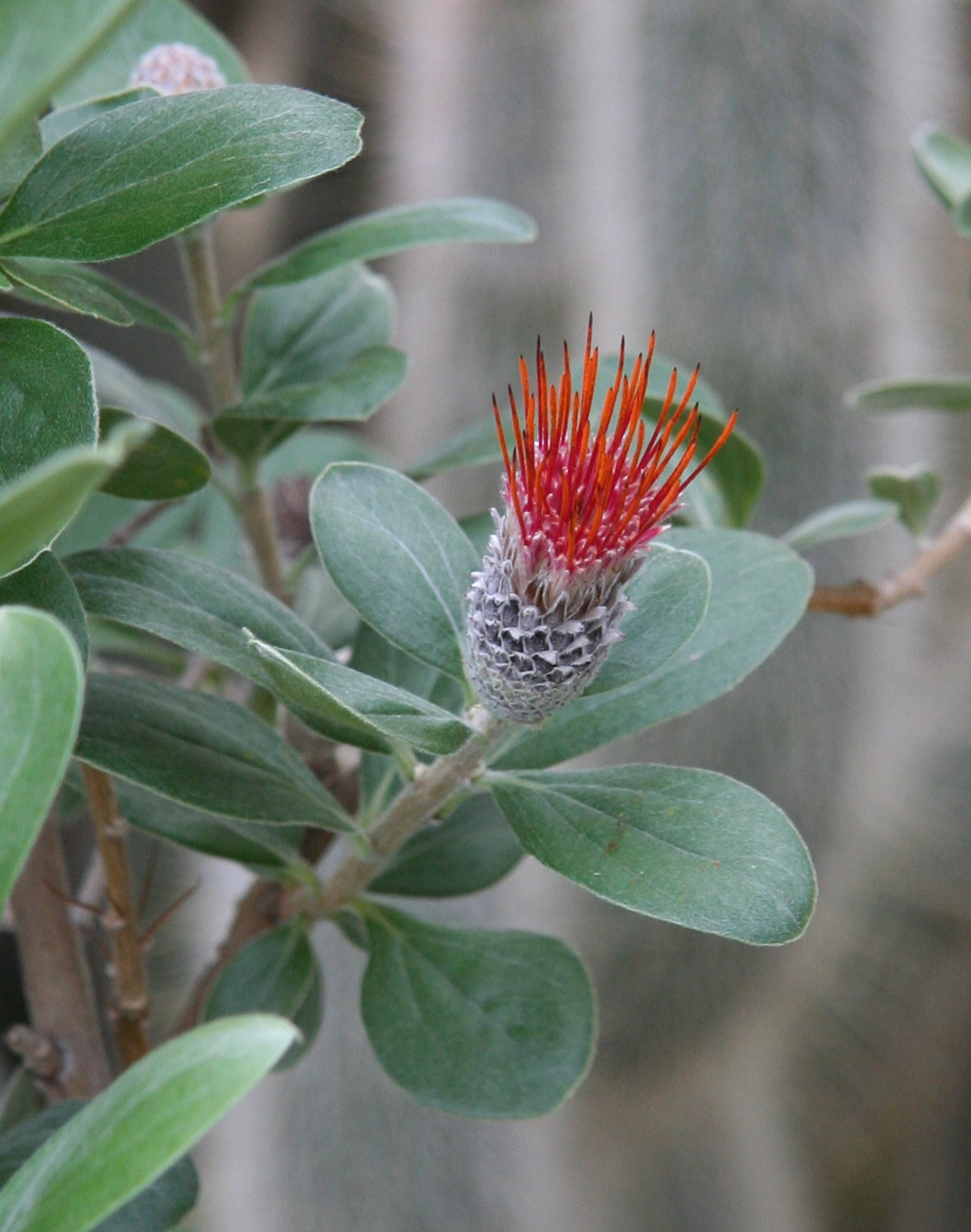
- Arnaldoa macbrideana

Scientific classification
- Kingdom: Plantae
- Clade: Embryophytes
- Clade: Tracheophytes
- Clade: Angiosperms
- Clade: Eudicots
- Clade: Asterids
- Order: Asterales
- Family: Asteraceae
- Subfamily: Barnadesioideae
- Tribe: Barnadesieae
- Genus: Arnaldoa; Cabrera

Type species
- Arnaldoa magnifica (syn of A. weberbaueri) Cabrera

= Arnaldoa =

Genus of flowering plants

Arnaldoa is a genus of flowering plants in the aster family, Asteraceae. It is native to Ecuador and Peru.

These plants are shrubs with spines located at the attachment point of each leaf to the stem. The flower heads contain disc florets in shades of orange, orange-red, purple, or cream and the pappus-tufted fruits are adapted for wind dispersal. The plants grow on dry, wooded or shrubby slopes at elevations between 1370 and 3000 metres.

Species

- Arnaldoa argentea C.Ulloa, P.Jørg. & M.O.Dillon – up to 3.5 meters tall with light orange or cream-colored florets (Ecuador)
- Arnaldoa coccinosantha (Muschl.) Ferreyra - Peru
- Arnaldoa macbrideana Ferreyra – purple florets (Peru)
- Arnaldoa weberbaueri (Muschl.) Ferreyra – bright orange-red or occasionally purple florets up to 5 centimeters long (Peru)

== Gallery ==
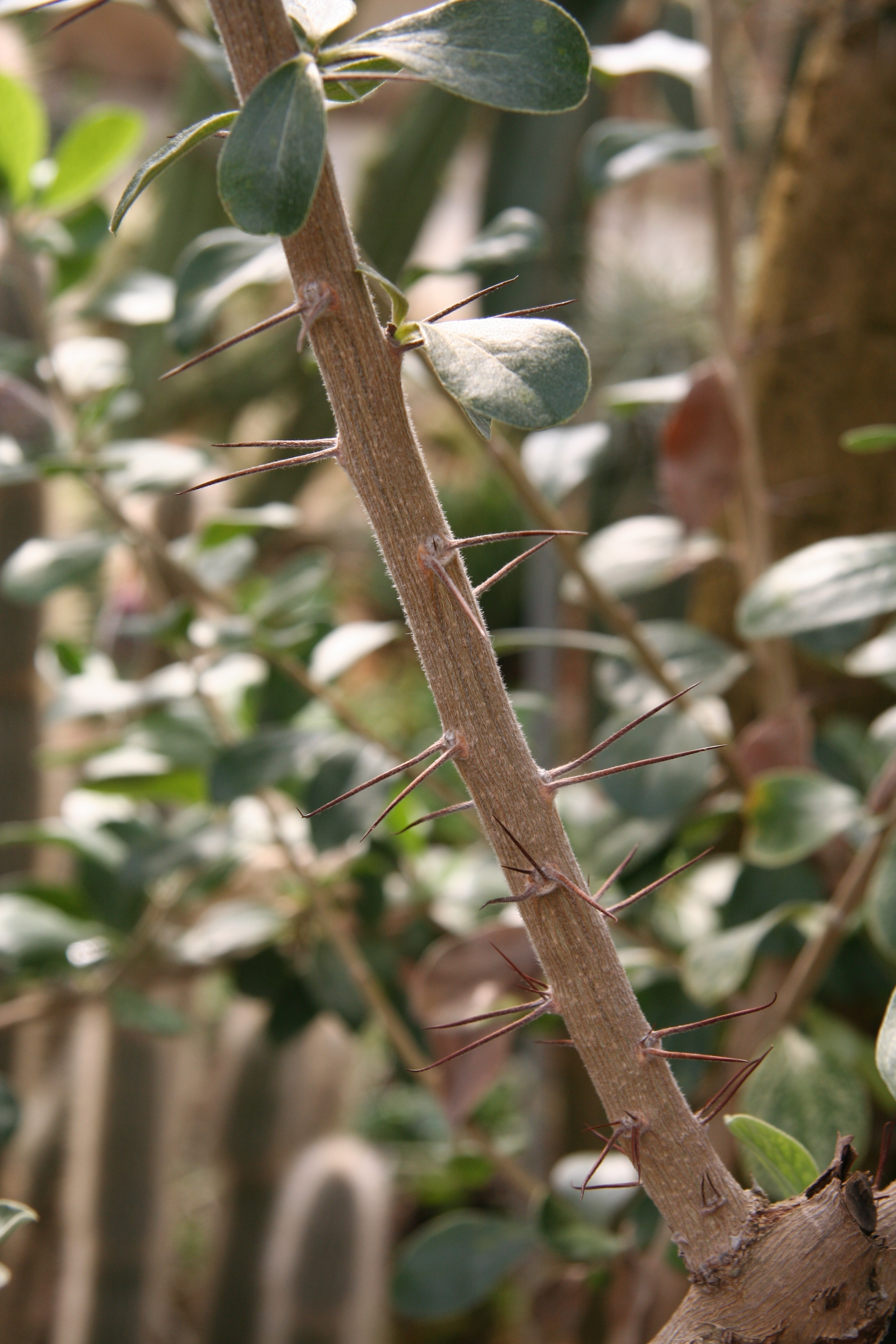
Detail of woody stem of A. macbrideana, showing paired spines

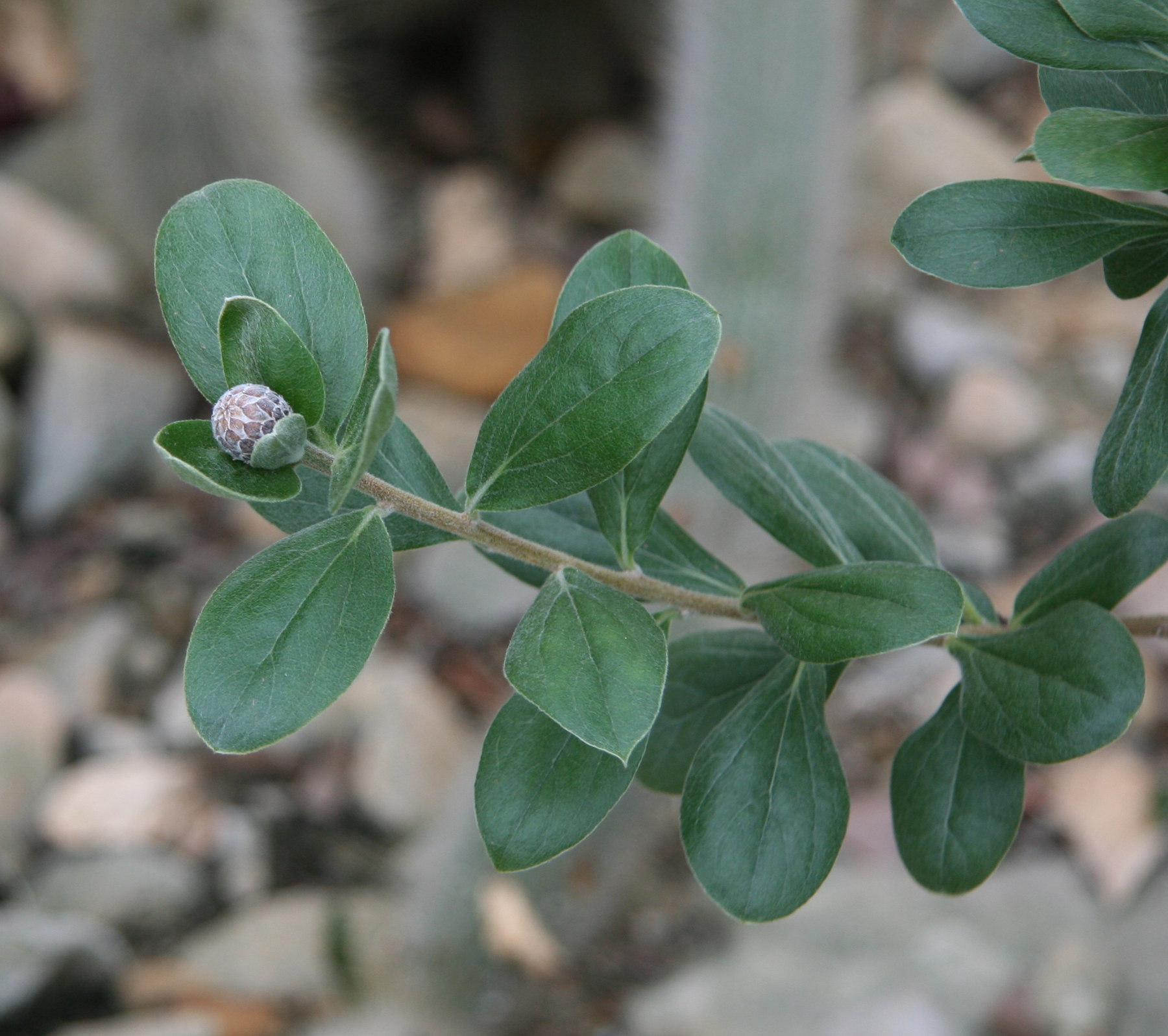
Flowering shoot of
A. macbrideana in bud, Dresden Botanical Garden

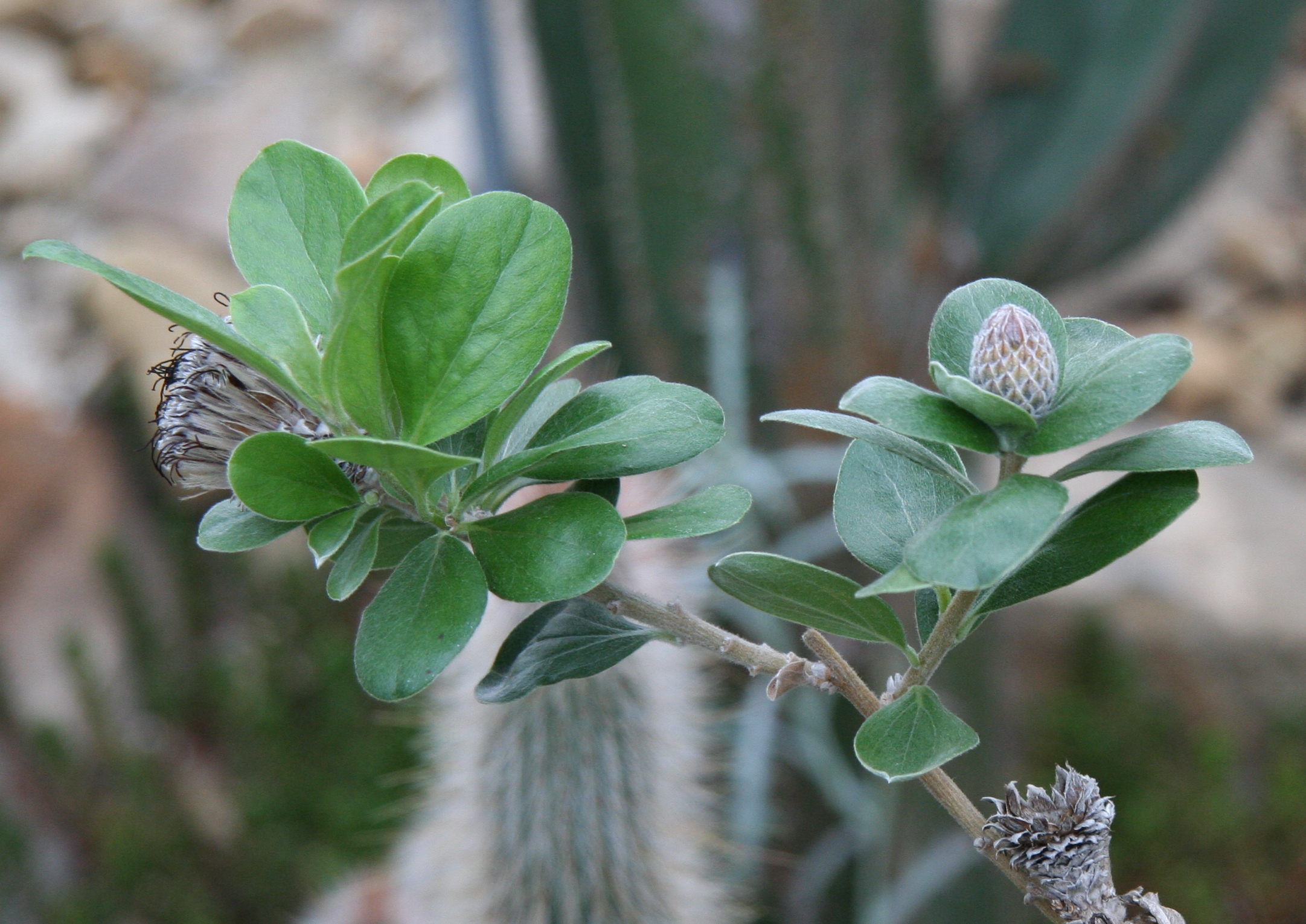
Flowering growth of A. macbrideana, showing bud and infructescences, that on left still enclosing pappus-tufted fruits
