= Fulcaldea =

Scientific classification
- Kingdom: Plantae
- Clade: Embryophytes
- Clade: Tracheophytes
- Clade: Angiosperms
- Clade: Eudicots
- Clade: Asterids
- Order: Asterales
- Family: Asteraceae
- Subfamily: Barnadesioideae
- Tribe: Barnadesieae
- Genus: Fulcaldea; Poir.
- Species: F. laurifolia

Binomial name
- Fulcaldea laurifolia (Bonpl.) Poir.

Synonyms
- Turpinia Bonpl. 1807, rejected name, not Turpinia Vent. 1807 (Staphyleaceae) nor Turpinia Lex. 1824 (Asteraceae); Dolichostylis Cass.; Turpinia laurifolia Bonpl.; Barnadesia laurifolia Kuntze; Barnadesia laurifolia Hieron.; Dolichostylis laurifolia Cass.; Turpinia laurifolia Humb. & Bonpl.

Genus of flowering plants

Fulcaldea is a genus of flowering plants in the daisy family.

Species

There is only one accepted species, Fulcaldea laurifolia, native to Peru and Ecuador.

formerly included

- Fulcaldea stuessyi Roque & V.A.Funk synonym of Eremosis tomentosa (La Llave & Lex.) Gleason
