= Barnadesia ciliata =

Conservation status
- Endangered (IUCN 3.1)

Scientific classification
- Kingdom: Plantae
- Clade: Tracheophytes
- Clade: Angiosperms
- Clade: Eudicots
- Clade: Asterids
- Order: Asterales
- Family: Asteraceae
- Genus: Barnadesia
- Species: B. ciliata

Binomial name
- Barnadesia ciliata (I.C.Chung) Harling

Synonyms
- Barnadesia lehmannii var. ciliata I.C.Chung

Species of flowering plant

Barnadesia ciliata is a species of flowering plant in the family Asteraceae. It is endemic to Ecuador. It has only been collected once, near Zaruma in El Oro Province in 1947. It is a shrub that grows in coastal foothill forest habitat. The area from which it was collected is undergoing habitat destruction.

It was first described as Barnadesia lehmannii var. ciliata by In Cho Chung in 1965. In 1991 Gunnar Wilhelm Harling named it a full species as Barnardesia ciliata.
