= Duseniella =

Scientific classification
- Kingdom: Plantae
- Clade: Embryophytes
- Clade: Tracheophytes
- Clade: Angiosperms
- Clade: Eudicots
- Clade: Asterids
- Order: Asterales
- Family: Asteraceae
- Subfamily: Barnadesioideae
- Tribe: Barnadesieae
- Genus: Duseniella; K.Schum. 1902. not Broth. 1906 (Meteoriaceae in Bryopsida)
- Species: D. patagonica

Binomial name
- Duseniella patagonica (O.Hoffm.) K.Schum.

Synonyms
- Dusenia patagonica O.Hoffm.; Duseniella bicolor Suess.

Genus of flowering plants

Duseniella is a genus of Argentine flowering plants in the family Asteraceae.

There is only one known species, Duseniella patagonica, endemic to the Patagonia region of southern Argentina.
