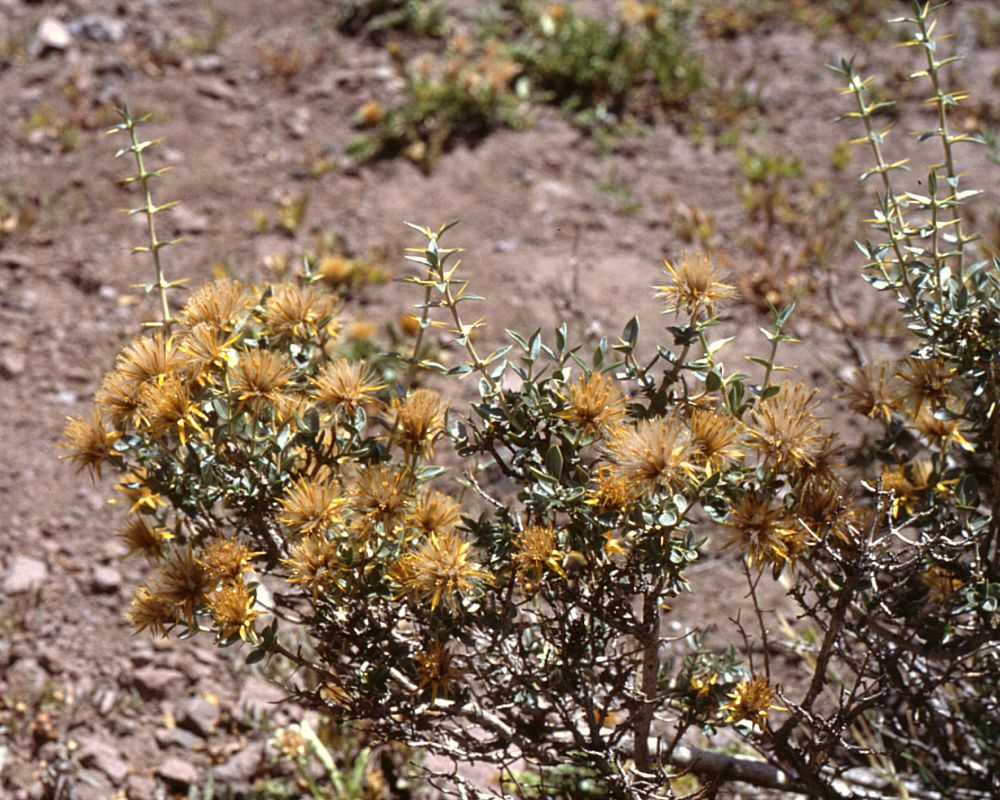
- Chuquiraga oppositifolia

Scientific classification
- Kingdom: Plantae
- Clade: Embryophytes
- Clade: Tracheophytes
- Clade: Angiosperms
- Clade: Eudicots
- Clade: Asterids
- Order: Asterales
- Family: Asteraceae
- Subfamily: Barnadesioideae; K.Bremer & R.K.Jansen
- Tribe: Barnadesieae; D.Don

Genera
- Archidasyphyllum; Arnaldoa; Barnadesia; Chuquiraga; Dasyphyllum; Doniophyton; Duseniella; Fulcaldea; Huarpea; Schlechtendalia

= Barnadesioideae =

Subfamily of flowering plants

Barnadesioideae is a subfamily of flowering plants in the aster family, Asteraceae. It comprises a single tribe, the Barnadesieae. The subfamily is endemic to South America. Molecular evidence suggests it is a basal clade within the family, and it is monophyletic.

The subfamily includes species of annual and perennial herbs, shrubs, and trees up to 30 meters tall. Most are likely pollinated by hummingbirds.

== Phylogeny ==
Genetic analysis has included increasing numbers of taxa and involved a growing number of genes. The relationships of the genus Schlechtendalia could so far not be resolved. The following tree reflects the current scientific insights and Schlechtendalia can be found in two possible positions.

- - Calyceraceae
  - Asteraceae
    - subfamily Barnadesioideae
      - ? Schlechtendalia luzulifolia ?
      - - - - ? Schlechtendalia luzulifolia ?
            - - Huarpea andina
              - Barnadesia
          - - Dasyphyllum
            - - Archidasyphyllum
              - - Fulcaldea laurifolia
                - Arnaldoa
        - - Duseniella patagonica
          - - Doniophyton
            - Chuquiraga
    - - subfamily Famatinanthoideae
      - - subfamily Mutisioideae
        - all other Asterid subfamilies

== Gallery ==
Some species from subfamily Barnadesioideae
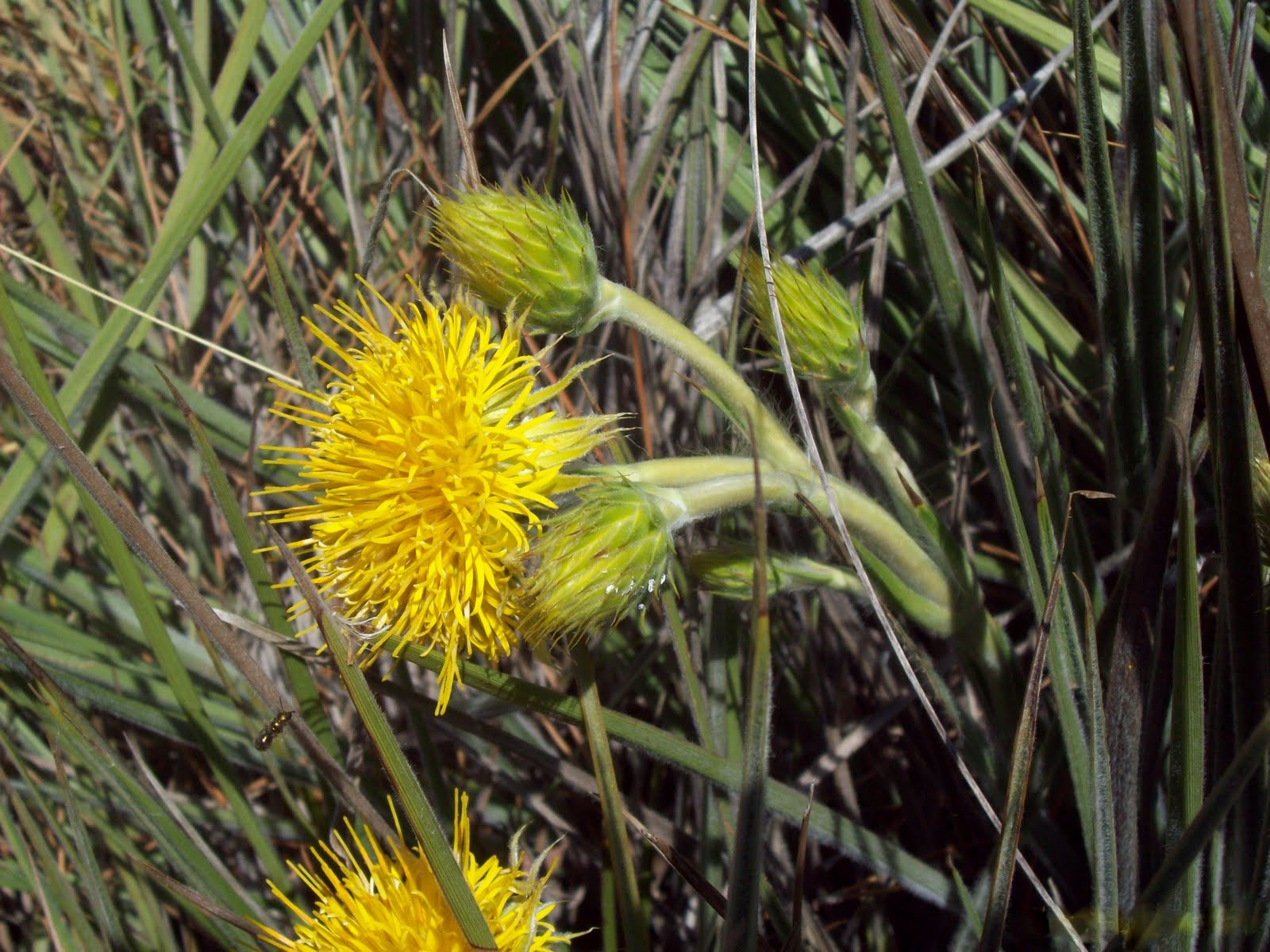
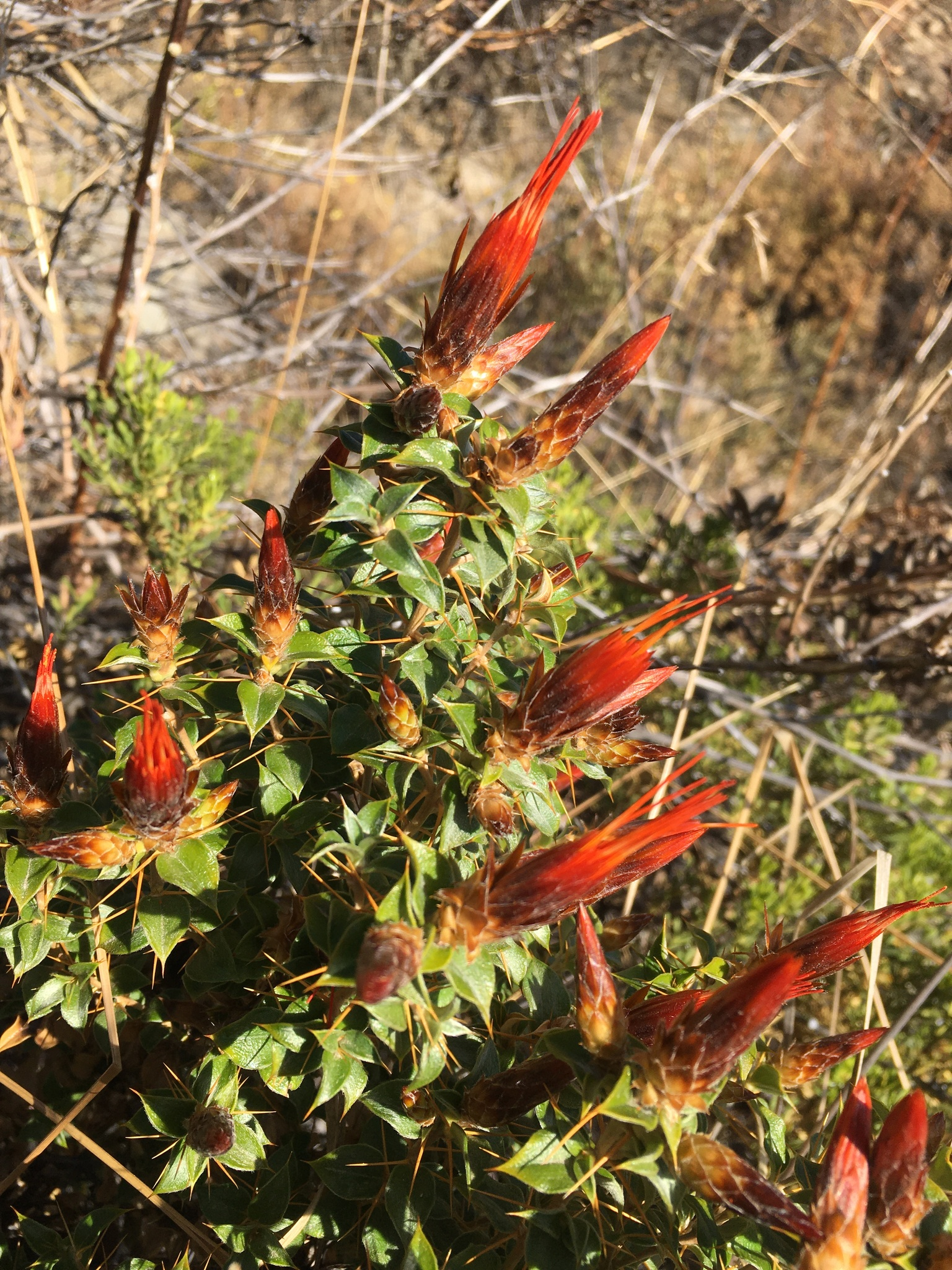
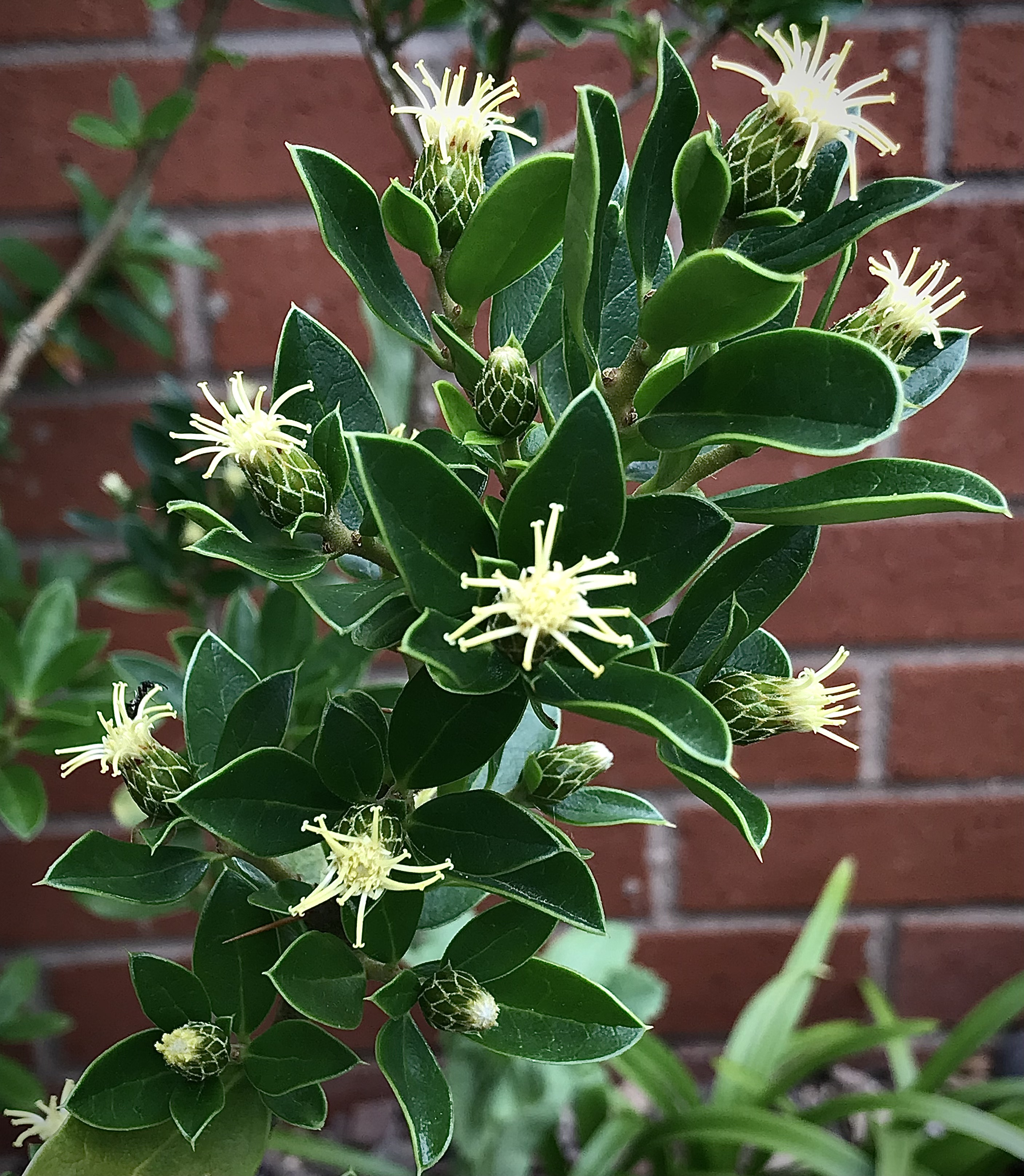
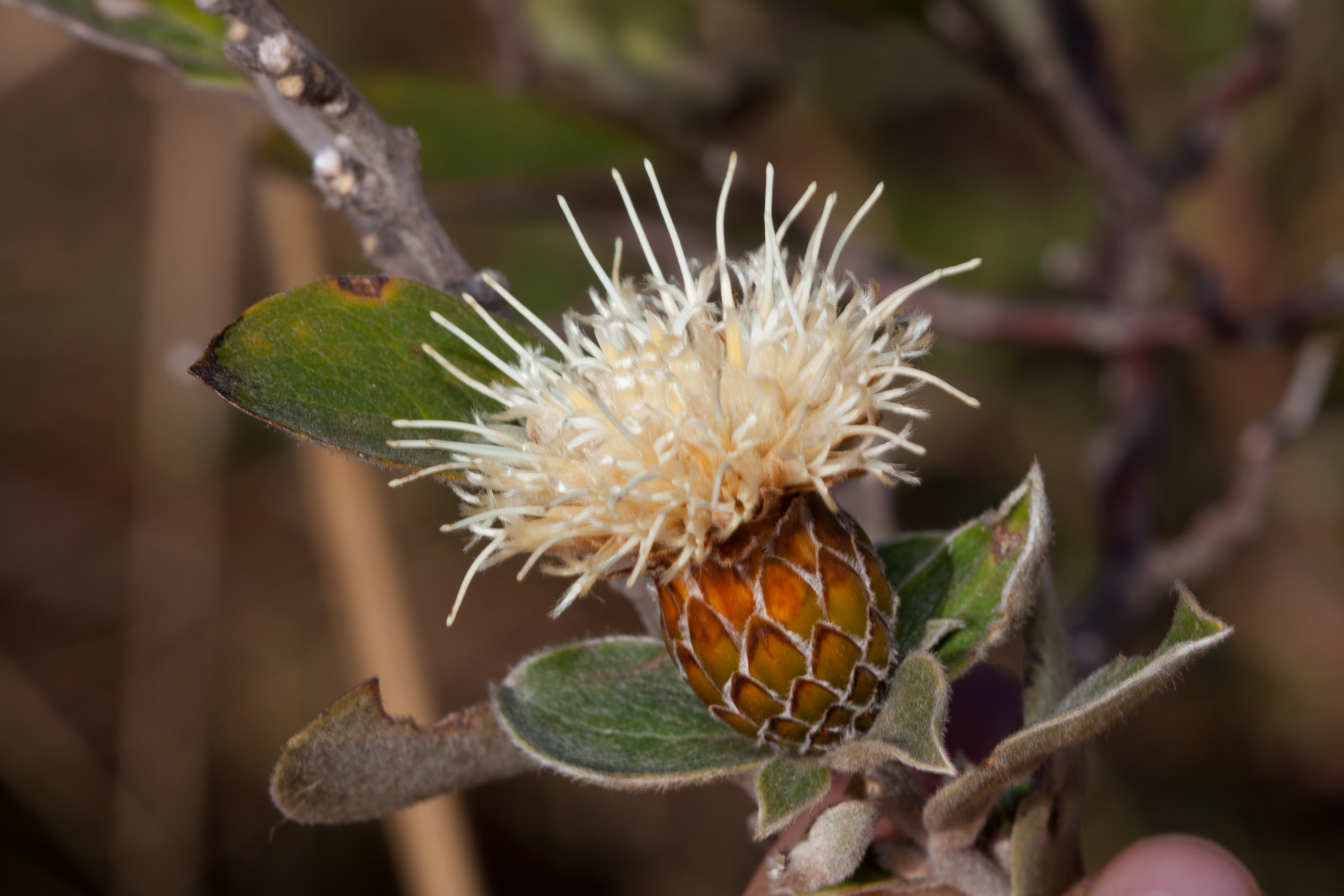
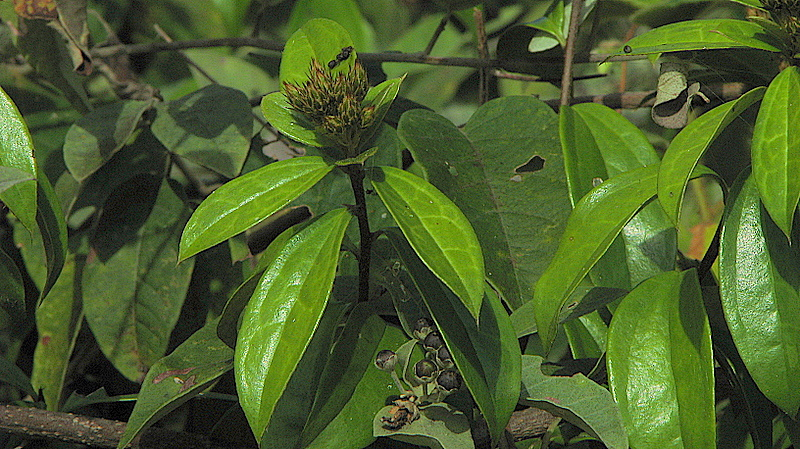
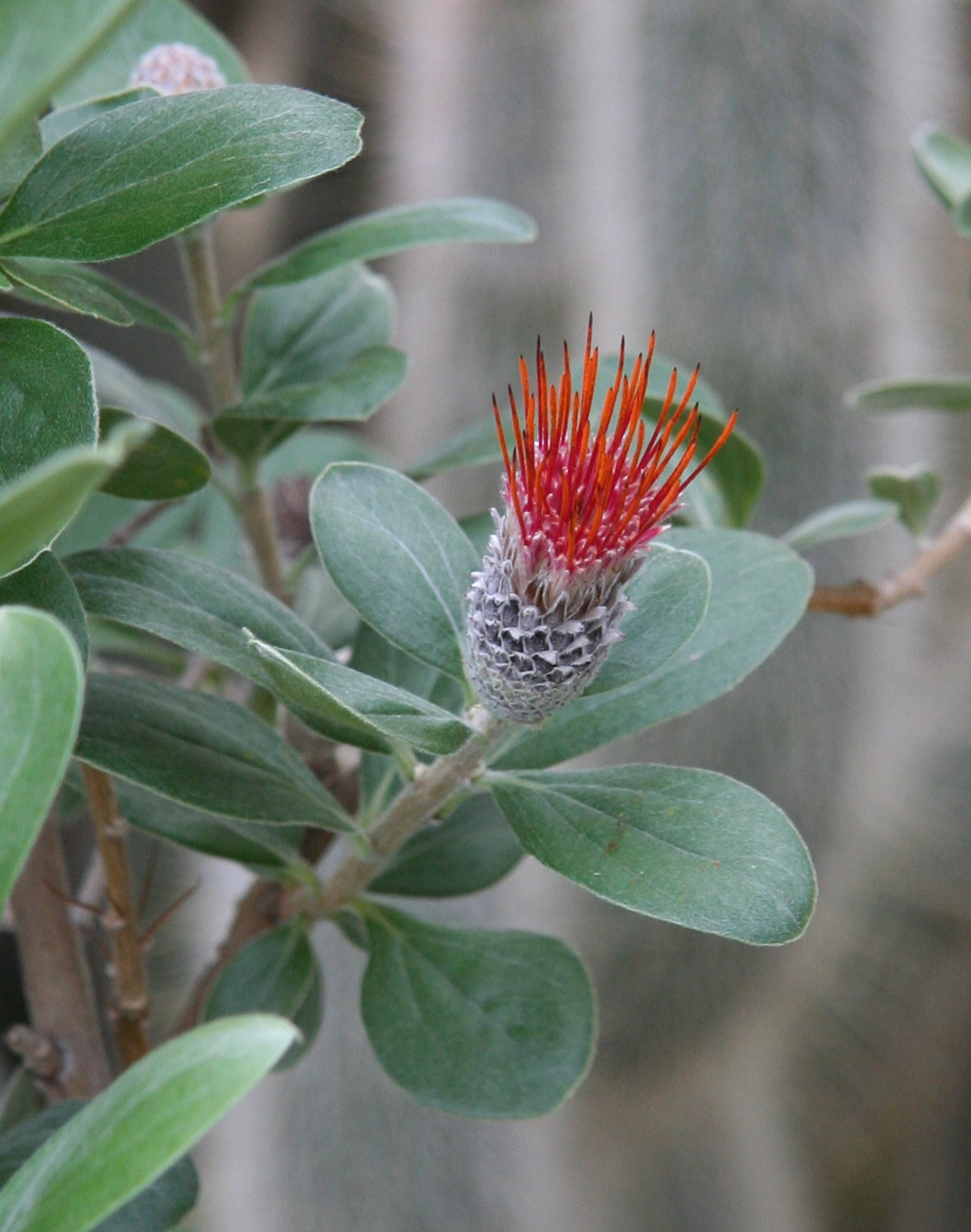
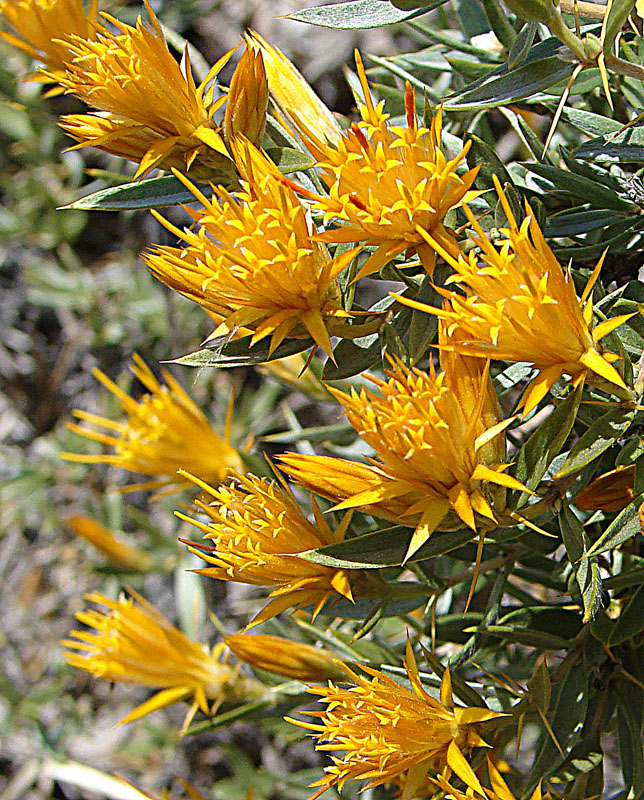
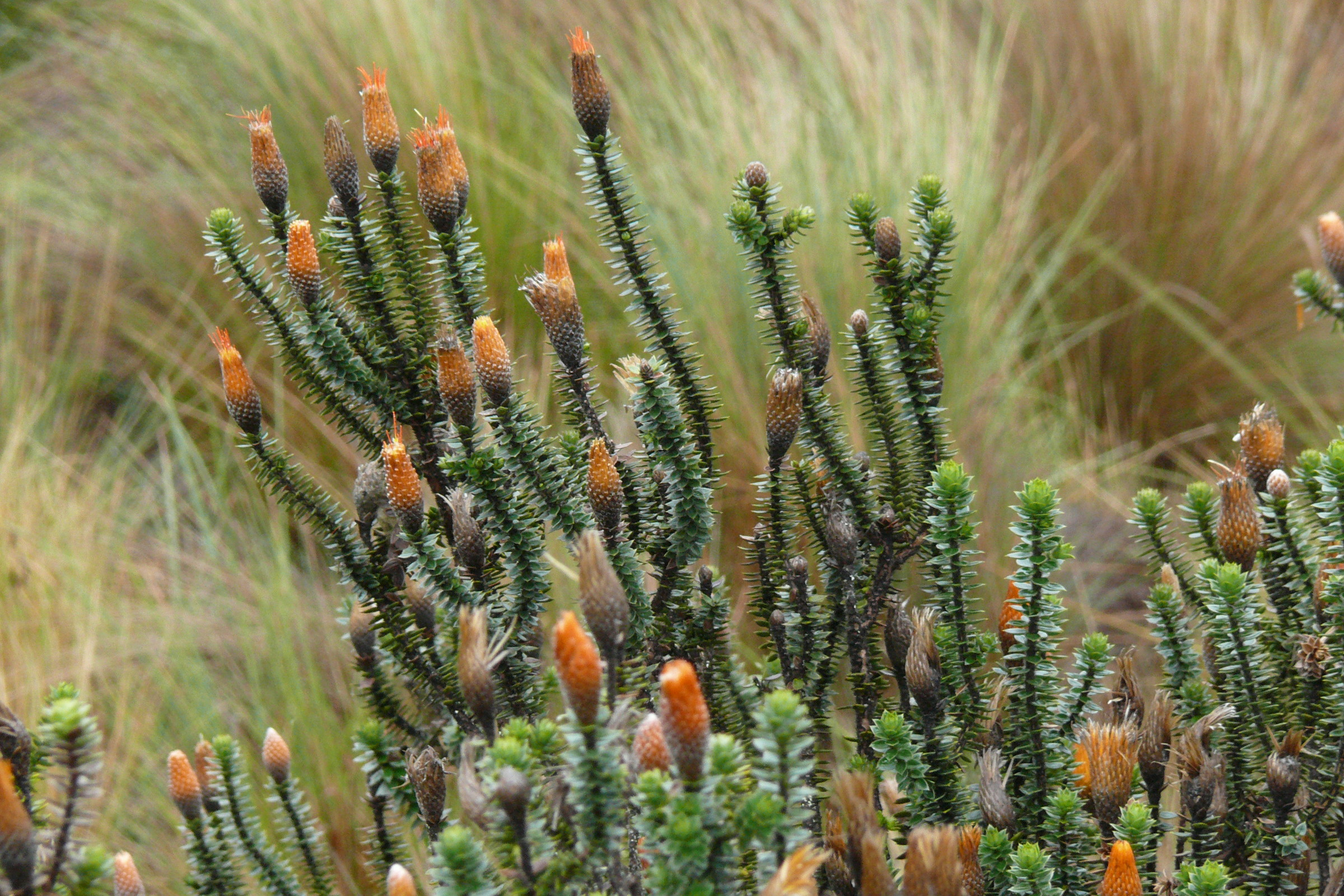
Some species from subfamily Barnadesioideae, left–right: Schlechtendalia luzulifolia, Chuquiraga spinosa, Archidasyphyllum diacanthoides, Dasyphyllum capitulum, Dasyphyllum lanceolatum, Arnaldoa macbrideana, Chuquiraga oppositifolia, Chuquiraga jussieui.
