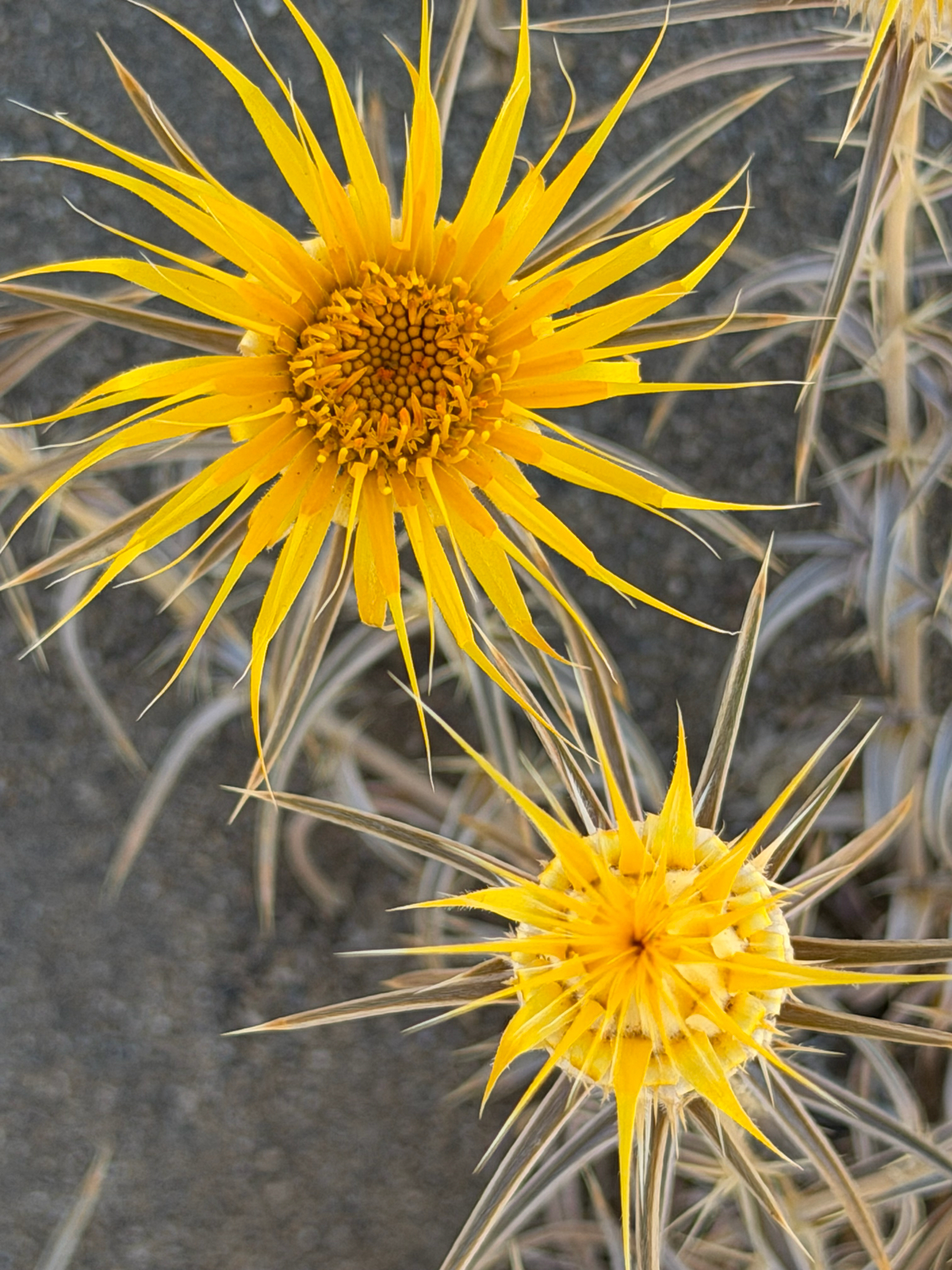
- Doniophyton anomalum in Argentina

Scientific classification
- Kingdom: Plantae
- Clade: Embryophytes
- Clade: Tracheophytes
- Clade: Angiosperms
- Clade: Eudicots
- Clade: Asterids
- Order: Asterales
- Family: Asteraceae
- Subfamily: Barnadesioideae
- Tribe: Barnadesieae
- Genus: Doniophyton; Wedd.

Type species
- Doniophyton andicolum Wedd.

Synonyms
- Chuquiraga sect. Gymnophoranta Remy

= Doniophyton =

Genus of flowering plants

Doniophyton is a genus of South American flowering plants in the daisy family.

Species

- Doniophyton anomalum (D.Don) Kurtz – Chile, Argentina
- Doniophyton weddellii Katinas & Stuessy – Chile, Argentina
