= Dasyphyllum lehmannii =

Conservation status
- Critically Endangered (IUCN 3.1)

Scientific classification
- Kingdom: Plantae
- Clade: Tracheophytes
- Clade: Angiosperms
- Clade: Eudicots
- Clade: Asterids
- Order: Asterales
- Family: Asteraceae
- Genus: Dasyphyllum
- Species: D. lehmannii

Binomial name
- Dasyphyllum lehmannii (Hieron.) Cabrera

Species of flowering plant

Dasyphyllum lehmannii is a species of flowering plant in the family Asteraceae. It is found only in Ecuador. Its natural habitat is subtropical or tropical moist montane forests. It is threatened by habitat loss.
