= Huarpea =

Scientific classification
- Kingdom: Plantae
- Clade: Embryophytes
- Clade: Tracheophytes
- Clade: Angiosperms
- Clade: Eudicots
- Clade: Asterids
- Order: Asterales
- Family: Asteraceae
- Subfamily: Barnadesioideae
- Tribe: Barnadesieae
- Genus: Huarpea; Cabrera
- Species: H. andina

Binomial name
- Huarpea andina Cabrera

Genus of flowering plants

Huarpea is a genus of flowering plants in the family Asteraceae.

Species

There is only one known species, Huarpea andina, found only in San Juan Province in Argentina.
