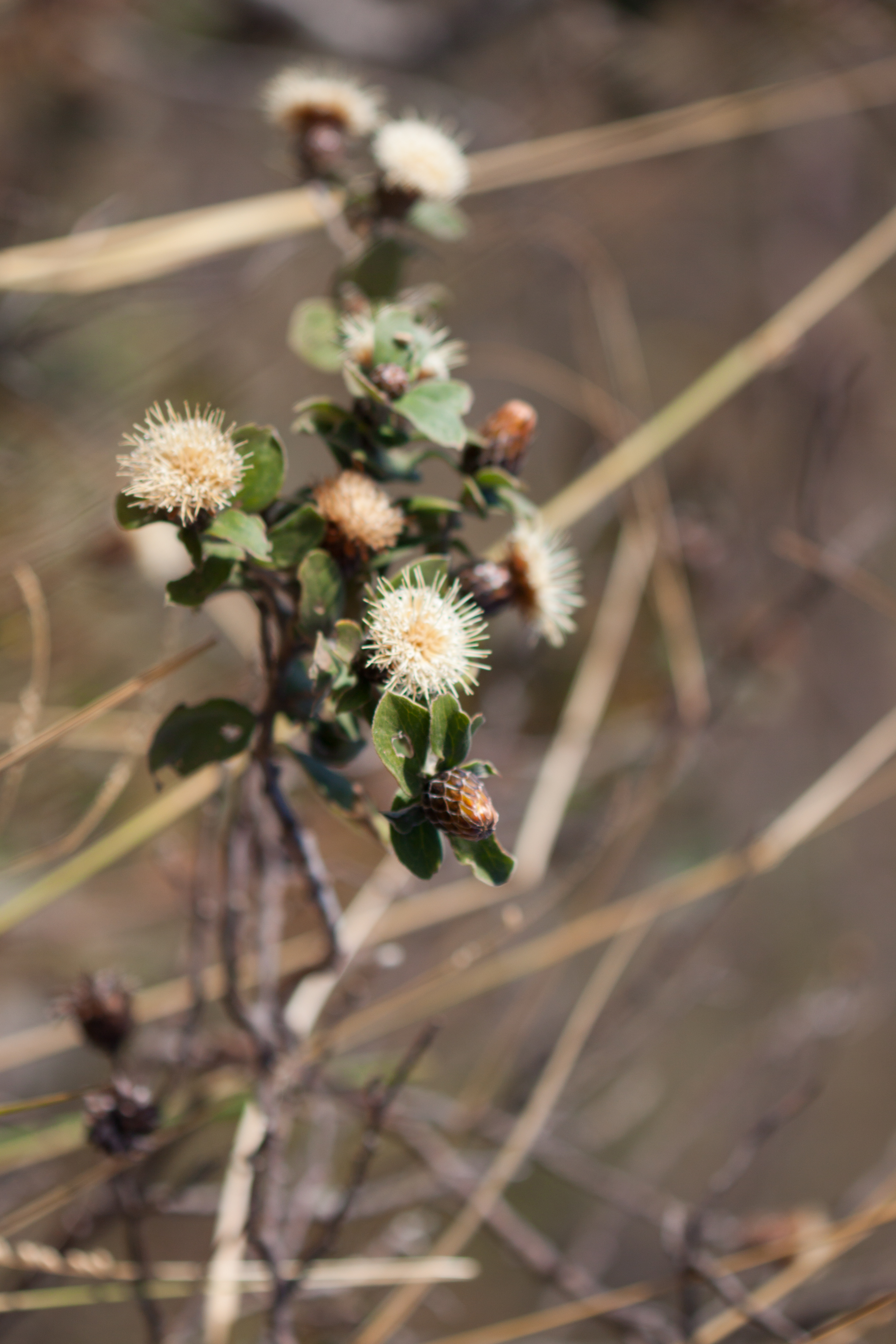
- Dasyphyllum sprengelianum

Scientific classification
- Kingdom: Plantae
- Clade: Embryophytes
- Clade: Tracheophytes
- Clade: Angiosperms
- Clade: Eudicots
- Clade: Asterids
- Order: Asterales
- Family: Asteraceae
- Subfamily: Barnadesioideae
- Tribe: Barnadesieae
- Genus: Dasyphyllum; Kunth

Synonyms
- Flotovia Spreng.

= Dasyphyllum =

Genus of flowering plants

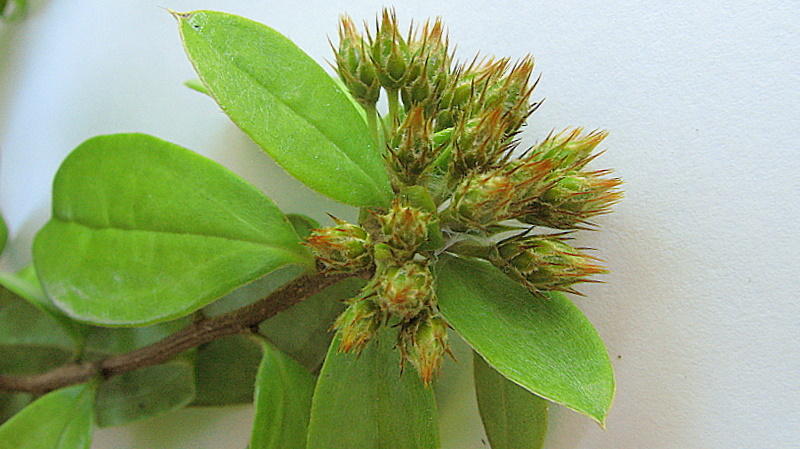
Dasyphyllum brasiliense

Dasyphyllum is a genus of flowering plants in the family Asteraceae. It is distributed in South America, with several species in southeastern Brazil.

As of August 2026, Plants of the World Online accepted these species:

- Dasyphyllum argenteum Kunth
- Dasyphyllum armatum (J.Kost.) Cabrera
- Dasyphyllum brasiliense (Spreng.) Cabrera
- Dasyphyllum brevispinum Sagást. & M.O.Dillon
- Dasyphyllum cabrerae Sagást.
- Dasyphyllum candolleanum (Gardner) Cabrera
- Dasyphyllum colombianum (Cuatrec.) Cabrera
- Dasyphyllum cryptocephalum (Baker) Cabrera
- Dasyphyllum diamantinense Saavedra & M.Monge
- Dasyphyllum donianum (Gardner) Cabrera
- Dasyphyllum ferox (Wedd.) Cabrera
- Dasyphyllum flagellare (Casar.) Cabrera
- Dasyphyllum floribundum (Gardner) Cabrera
- Dasyphyllum fodinarum (Gardner) Cabrera
- Dasyphyllum horridum (Muschl.) Cabrera
- Dasyphyllum hystrix (Wedd.) Cabrera
- Dasyphyllum inerme (Rusby) Cabrera
- Dasyphyllum lanceolatum (Less.) Cabrera
- Dasyphyllum latifolium (Gardner) Cabrera
- Dasyphyllum lehmannii (Hieron.) Cabrera
- Dasyphyllum leiocephalum (Wedd.) Cabrera
- Dasyphyllum leptacanthum (Gardner) Cabrera
- Dasyphyllum maria-lianae Zardini & Soria
- Dasyphyllum orthacanthum (DC.) Cabrera
- Dasyphyllum popayanense (Hieron.) Cabrera
- Dasyphyllum reticulatum (DC.) Cabrera
- Dasyphyllum spinescens (Less.) Cabrera
- Dasyphyllum sprengelianum (Gardner) Cabrera
- Dasyphyllum synacanthum (Baker) Cabrera
- Dasyphyllum tomentosum (Spreng.) Cabrera
- Dasyphyllum trichophyllum (Baker) Cabrera
- Dasyphyllum vagans (Gardner) Cabrera
- Dasyphyllum varians (Gardner) Cabrera
- Dasyphyllum velutinum (Baker) Cabrera
- Dasyphyllum vepreculatum (D.Don) Cabrera
- Dasyphyllum weberbaueri (Tovar) Cabrera

== Etymology of genus name ==
The genus name Dasyphyllum is a compound of the Greek elements δασύς (dasus ) 'hairy' and φύλλον (phyllon) 'leaf', thus meaning "plant with hairy leaves".
