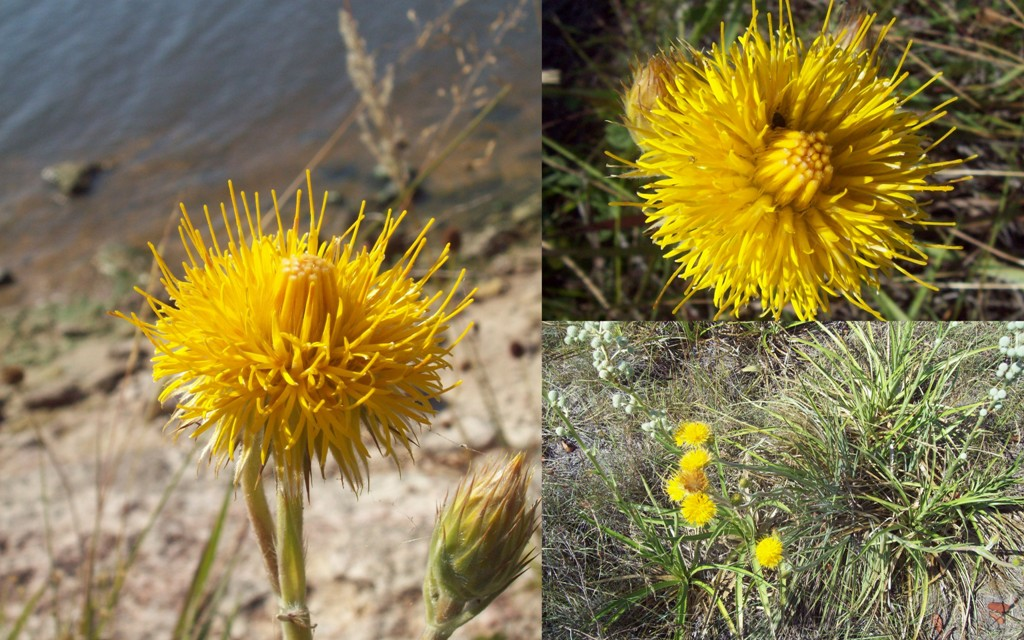

Scientific classification
- Kingdom: Plantae
- Clade: Tracheophytes
- Clade: Angiosperms
- Clade: Eudicots
- Clade: Asterids
- Order: Asterales
- Family: Asteraceae
- Subfamily: Barnadesioideae
- Tribe: Barnadesieae
- Genus: Schlechtendalia; Less.
- Species: S. luzulifolia

Binomial name
- Schlechtendalia luzulifolia Less. 1830, conserved name not Willd. (syn of Dyssodia) nor Spreng. 1827 (Malvaceae)

Synonyms
- Chamissomneia Kuntze; Chamissomenia Kuntze; Schlechtendalia luzulaefolia Less., alternate spelling; Chamissomneia luzulifolia (Less.) Kuntze

= Schlechtendalia luzulifolia =

Species of plant

Schlechtendalia is a genus of South American plants in the tribe Barnadesieae within the family Asteraceae. It is known in Portuguese as bolão de ouro, meaning "gold bullion". It is a perennial herbaceous plant, with rigid, linear leaves with a pointy tip. The corollas of the florets are yellow, and of the subbilobiate type, with four lobes merged into a strap, but split into teeth over half as deep, and one lobe (towards the centre of the flowerhead) free. This species flowers from September to December and the fruits are ripe in January or February. The only known species is Schlechtendalia luzulifolia, native to southern Brazil (Paraná, Rio Grande do Sul), Uruguay (Cerro Largo, Maldonado, Montevideo, Rocha), northern Argentina (Buenos Aires, Entre Ríos). This species has sixteen chromosomes (2n=16).

== Species previously assigned Schlechtendalia ==
- Schlechtendalia cancellata = Adenophyllum porophyllum var. cancellatum
- Schlechtendalia capillacea = Adenophyllum glandulosum
- Schlechtendalia glandulosa = Adenophyllum glandulosum

== Etymology ==
The genus name honors German botanist Diederich Franz Leonhard von Schlechtendal. The species epithet luzulaefolia, refers to this plant having leaves similar to a woodrush.
