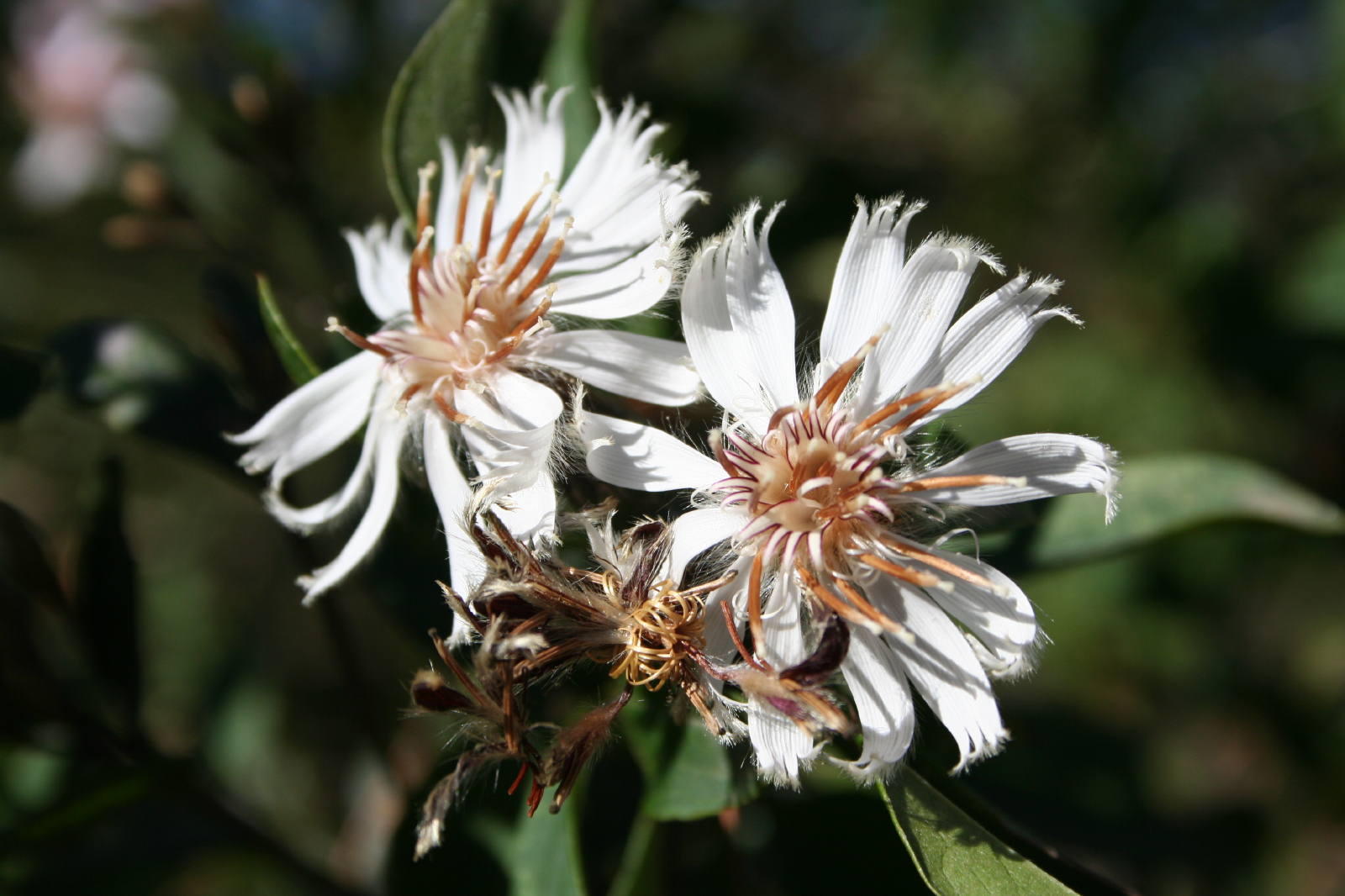
- Barnadesia sp.

Scientific classification
- Kingdom: Plantae
- Clade: Tracheophytes
- Clade: Angiosperms
- Clade: Eudicots
- Clade: Asterids
- Order: Asterales
- Family: Asteraceae
- Subfamily: Barnadesioideae
- Tribe: Barnadesieae
- Genus: Barnadesia; Mutis ex L.f.

Synonyms
- Penthea (D.Don) Spach 1841, illegitimate homonym, not Penthea Lindl. 1835 (Orchidaceae); Bacasia Ruiz & Pav.; Diacantha Less.

= Barnadesia =

Genus of flowering plants

Barnadesia is a genus of flowering plants in the aster family, Asteraceae. It is native to South America, where it is distributed from Colombia to northern Argentina, with most species occurring in the Andes. Common names include clavelillo, chivo caspi, espino de gato, and espino santo.

These plants are mainly shrubs and small trees, the largest exceeding four metres (13 ft) in height. The stems are spiny. The flower heads contain pink, red, or purple florets, including 8 to 13 hairy ray florets and usually either one or three disc florets. The ray floret yields a fruit with a plumelike pappus, and the fruit from a disc floret has a more "bristle-like contorted pappus".

Species

- Barnadesia aculeata
- Barnadesia arborea
- Barnadesia blakeana
- Barnadesia caryophylla
- Barnadesia ciliata
- Barnadesia corymbosa
- Barnadesia dombeyana
- Barnadesia glomerata
- Barnadesia horrida
- Barnadesia inermis
- Barnadesia jelskii
- Barnadesia kingii
- Barnadesia lehmannii
- Barnadesia macbridei
- Barnadesia macrocephala
- Barnadesia odorata
- Barnadesia parviflora
- Barnadesia polyacantha
- Barnadesia pycnophylla
- Barnadesia reticulata
- Barnadesia spinosa
- Barnadesia woodii
- Barnadesia wurdackii
