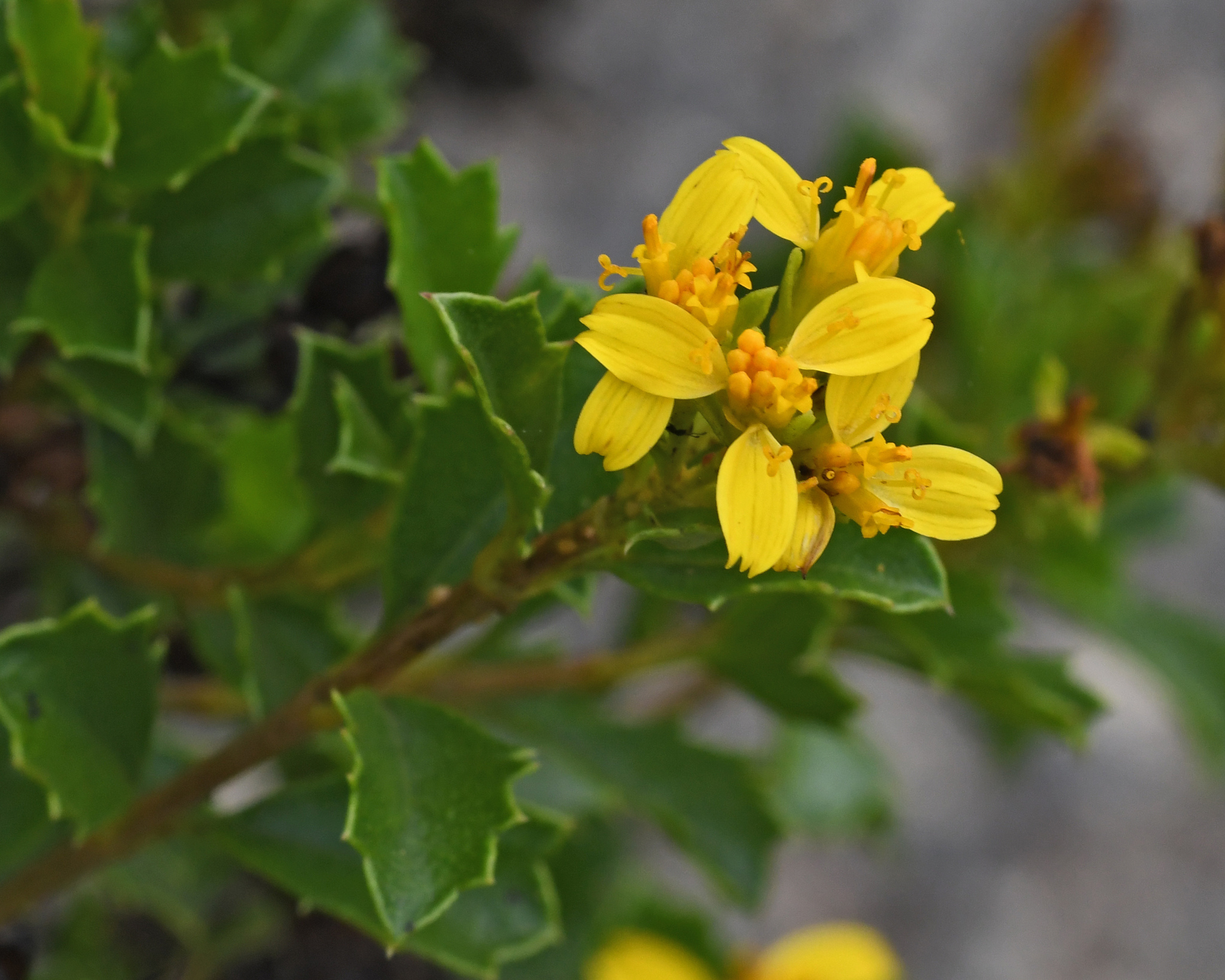
- Narvalina domingensis

Scientific classification
- Kingdom: Plantae
- Clade: Tracheophytes
- Clade: Angiosperms
- Clade: Eudicots
- Clade: Asterids
- Order: Asterales
- Family: Asteraceae
- Tribe: Coreopsideae
- Genus: Narvalina; Cass.

Synonyms
- Needhamia Cass., nom. illeg.

= Narvalina =

Genus of flowering plants

Narvalina is a genus of flowering plants in the dahlia tribe within the sunflower family. It includes two species native to Hispaniola (the Dominican Republic and Haiti).

== Species ==
Two species are accepted.

- Narvalina antrorsa Pruski – Dominican Republic
- Narvalina domingensis (Cass.) Less. – Dominican Republic and Haiti

formerly included

see Cyathomone Ericentrodea Lasianthaea

- Narvalina corazonensis Hieron. - Ericentrodea corazonensis (Hieron.) S.F.Blake & Sherff
- Narvalina fruticosa (L.) Urb. - Lasianthaea fruticosa (L.) K.M.Becker
- Narvalina homogama Hieron. - Ericentrodea homogama (Hieron.) S.F.Blake & Sherff
- Narvalina sodiroi Hieron. - Cyathomone sodiroi (Hieron.) S.F.Blake
