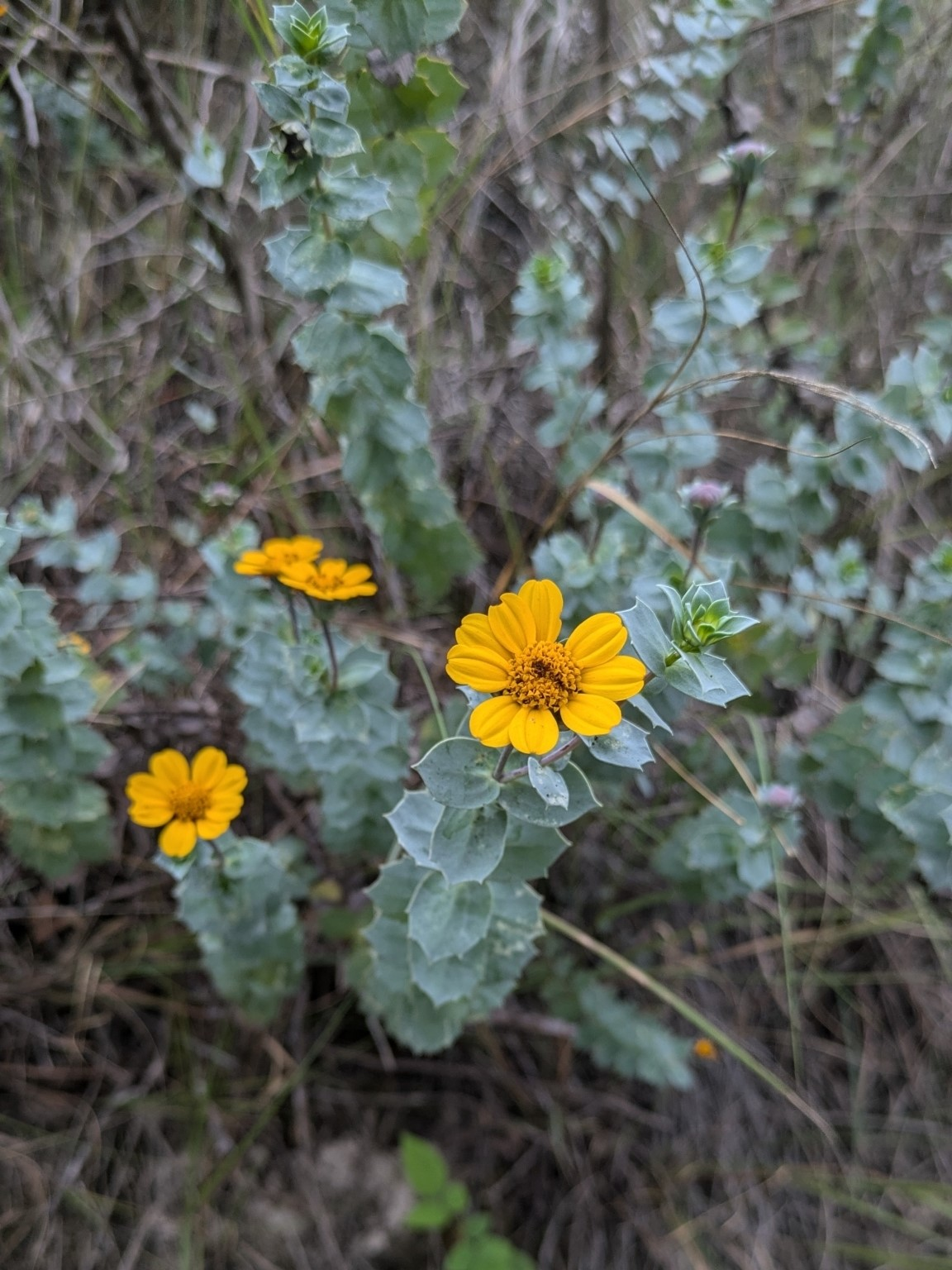
- Burnellia connata

Scientific classification
- Kingdom: Plantae
- Clade: Tracheophytes
- Clade: Angiosperms
- Clade: Eudicots
- Clade: Asterids
- Order: Asterales
- Family: Asteraceae
- Subfamily: Asteroideae
- Tribe: Coreopsideae
- Genus: Burnellia; Mesfin & D.J.Crawford (2023)

Species
- 28; see text

= Burnellia =

Genus of flowering plants

Burnellia is genus of flowering plants in the sunflower family, Asteraceae. It includes 28 species native to western South America, ranging from Colombia through Ecuador and Peru to Bolivia.

Species in the genus were formerly placed in Coreopsis sect. Pseudoagarista. A phylogenetic study found that both Coreopsis and section Pseudoagarista were polyphyletic, and the species in section Pseudoagarista were placed in the new genera Pseudoagarista, with 11 species endemic to Mexico, and Burnellia, which includes the South American species.

== Species ==
28 species are accepted.

- Burnellia cajamarcana (Sagást. & Sánchez Vega) Mesfin & D.J.Crawford
- Burnellia capillacea (Kunth) Mesfin & D.J.Crawford
- Burnellia celendinensis (Sagást. & Sánchez Vega) Mesfin & D.J.Crawford
- Burnellia connata (Cabrera) Mesfin & D.J.Crawford
- Burnellia dentifolia (Sánchez Vega, Sagást. & D.J.Crawford) Mesfin & D.J.Crawford
- Burnellia dilloniana (Sánchez Vega, Sagást. & D.J.Crawford) Mesfin & D.J.Crawford
- Burnellia fasciculata (Wedd.) Mesfin & D.J.Crawford
- Burnellia ferreyrae (Sagást. & Sánchez Vega) Mesfin & D.J.Crawford
- Burnellia foliosa (A.Gray) Mesfin & D.J.Crawford
- Burnellia helleborifolia (Sánchez Vega, Sagást. & D.J.Crawford) Mesfin & D.J.Crawford
- Burnellia holodasya (S.F.Blake) Mesfin & D.J.Crawford
- Burnellia lopez-mirandae (Sagást.) Mesfin & D.J.Crawford
- Burnellia macbridei (Sherff) Mesfin & D.J.Crawford
- Burnellia microlepis (S.F.Blake & Sherff) Mesfin & D.J.Crawford
- Burnellia namorana Mesfin & D.J.Crawford
- Burnellia nodosa (Sherff) Mesfin & D.J.Crawford
- Burnellia notha (S.F.Blake & Sherff) Mesfin & D.J.Crawford
- Burnellia oblanceolata (S.F.Blake) Mesfin & D.J.Crawford
- Burnellia obovatifolia (Sagást.) Mesfin & D.J.Crawford
- Burnellia parviceps (S.F.Blake & Sherff) Mesfin & D.J.Crawford
- Burnellia pervelutina (Sagást.) Mesfin & D.J.Crawford
- Burnellia pickeringii (A.Gray) Mesfin & D.J.Crawford
- Burnellia polyactis (S.F.Blake & Greenm.) Mesfin & D.J.Crawford
- Burnellia senaria (S.F.Blake & Sherff) Mesfin & D.J.Crawford
- Burnellia sherffii (S.F.Blake) Mesfin & D.J.Crawford
- Burnellia townsendii (S.F.Blake) Mesfin & D.J.Crawford
- Burnellia venusta (Kunth) Mesfin & D.J.Crawford
- Burnellia woytkowskii (Sherff) Mesfin & D.J.Crawford
