= Plagiocheilus =

Scientific classification
- Kingdom: Plantae
- Clade: Tracheophytes
- Clade: Angiosperms
- Clade: Eudicots
- Clade: Asterids
- Order: Asterales
- Family: Asteraceae
- Subfamily: Asteroideae
- Tribe: Astereae
- Subtribe: Baccharidinae
- Genus: Plagiocheilus; Arn. ex DC.

Type species
- Plagiocheilus tanaceotoides Haenk. ex DC

Synonyms
- Polygyne Phil.

Genus of plants

Plagiocheilus is a genus of flowering plant in the family Asteraceae. It is now classified in tribe Astereae, but used to be placed with the Anthemideae.

Species

- Plagiocheilus bogotensis (Kunth) Wedd. - Colombia, Ecuador, Peru
- Plagiocheilus ciliaris Wedd. - Bolivia
- Plagiocheilus frigidus Poepp. & Endl. - Ecuador, Peru
- Plagiocheilus herzogii Beauverd ex Herzog - Bolivia
- Plagiocheilus peduncularis (Kunth) Wedd. - Ecuador
- Plagiocheilus soliviformis DC. - Bolivia
- Plagiocheilus tanacetoides Haenke ex DC. - Paraguay, Argentina

formerly included

see Chrysanthellum

- Plagiocheilus erectus Rusby - Chrysanthellum indicum DC.
