= Tetranthus =

Scientific classification
- Kingdom: Plantae
- Clade: Embryophytes
- Clade: Tracheophytes
- Clade: Angiosperms
- Clade: Eudicots
- Clade: Asterids
- Order: Asterales
- Family: Asteraceae
- Subfamily: Asteroideae
- Tribe: Heliantheae
- Subtribe: Spilanthinae
- Genus: Tetranthus; Sw.

Type species
- Tetranthus littoralis Sw.

Genus of plants

Tetranthus is a genus of flowering plants in the tribe Heliantheae within the family Asteraceae.

Species

- Tetranthus bahamensis Britt. – Bahamas
- Tetranthus cupulatus Urb. – Hispaniola
- Tetranthus hirsutus Spreng. – Hispaniola
- Tetranthus littoralis Sw. – Hispaniola

formerly included

see Pinillosia

- Tetranthus berteroi – Pinillosia berteroi
