= Lemonheads =

Lemonhead(s) may refer to:

Music

- The Lemonheads, an alternative rock band from the United States
  - The Lemonheads (album)
- "Lemonhead", a song by Tyler, the Creator from the album Call Me If You Get Lost
- "Lemon Head", a song by Lil Yachty from the album Lil Boat 3

People / characters

- Lemonhead, a character in the video game series Monkey Island
- Curtis Lemansky (nicknamed "Lemonhead"), a character from television series "The Shield"
- Cleo Lemon (nicknamed "Lemonhead"), former NFL quarterback

Other uses

- Lemonhead (candy), a brand of candy produced by the Ferrara Pan Candy Company
- Coreocarpus arizonicus (little lemonhead), a North American species of flowering plants in the daisy family
