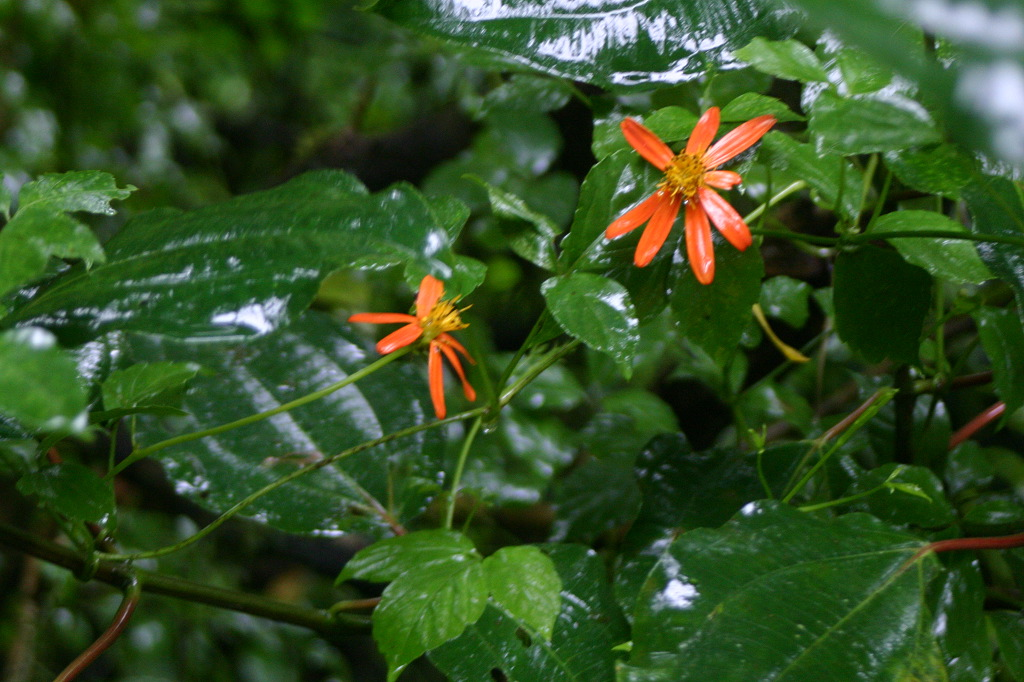
- Hidalgoa ternata Monteverde Cloud Forest Reserve, Costa Rica.

Scientific classification
- Kingdom: Plantae
- Clade: Tracheophytes
- Clade: Angiosperms
- Clade: Eudicots
- Clade: Asterids
- Order: Asterales
- Family: Asteraceae
- Genus: Hidalgoa
- Species: H. ternata

Binomial name
- Hidalgoa ternata La Llave

Synonyms
- Hidalgoa breedlovei Sherff; Hidalgoa lessingii DC.; Hidalgoa pentamera Sherff; Hidalgoa steyermarkii Sherff; Melampodium hidalgoa DC.; Melampodium ternatum DC.

= Hidalgoa ternata =

Species of plant

Hidalgoa ternata is a flowering plant in the tribe Coreopsideae of the family Asteraceae. It is found in areas of the tropics in the Americas.

== Distribution ==
The plant is native to southern Mexico, Central America, and northwestern South America.

It is common in montane cloud forests in Costa Rica, such as in the Monteverde Cloud Forest Reserve.

== Description ==
Hidalgoa ternata is a hemi-epiphytic vine.

It is distinguished by its deep orange flowers and ternate leaves.
