= Diodontium =

Scientific classification
- Kingdom: Plantae
- Clade: Tracheophytes
- Clade: Angiosperms
- Clade: Eudicots
- Clade: Asterids
- Order: Asterales
- Family: Asteraceae
- Subfamily: Asteroideae
- Tribe: Coreopsideae
- Genus: Diodontium; F.Muell.
- Species: D. filifolium

Binomial name
- Diodontium filifolium F.Muell.

Synonyms
- Glossogyne filifolia (F.Muell.) F.Muell. ex Benth.

Genus of flowering plants

Diodontium is a genus of flowering plants in the daisy family.

There is only one known species, Diodontium filifolium, native to Australia, found in Western Australia, Queensland, and the Northern Territory.
