= Pinillosia =

Scientific classification
- Kingdom: Plantae
- Clade: Tracheophytes
- Clade: Angiosperms
- Clade: Eudicots
- Clade: Asterids
- Order: Asterales
- Family: Asteraceae
- Subfamily: Asteroideae
- Tribe: Coreopsideae
- Genus: Pinillosia; Ossa ex DC.
- Species: P. berteroi

Binomial name
- Pinillosia berteroi (Spreng.) Urb.

Synonyms
- Pinillosia berteri (Spreng.) Urb., alternate spelling; Pinillosia berterii (Spreng.) Urb., alternate spelling; Tetranthus berteroi Spreng.

Genus of flowering plants

Pinillosia is a genus of Caribbean plants in the cosmos tribe within the daisy family.

Species

The only known species is Pinillosia berteroi, native to Cuba (including Isla de la Juventud) and Hispaniola.

formerly included

Pinillosia bellioides - Tetraperone bellioides
