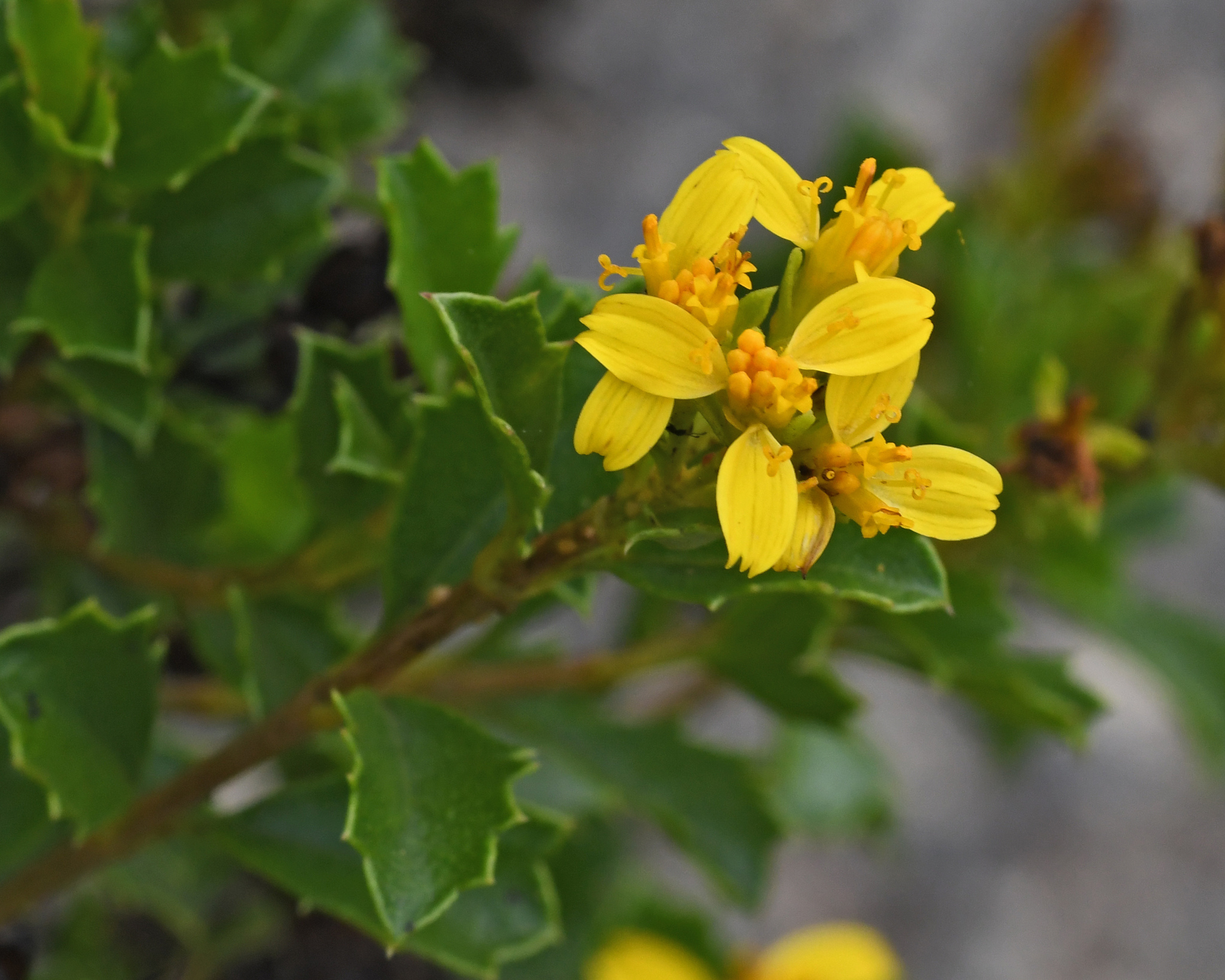

Scientific classification
- Kingdom: Plantae
- Clade: Tracheophytes
- Clade: Angiosperms
- Clade: Eudicots
- Clade: Asterids
- Order: Asterales
- Family: Asteraceae
- Genus: Narvalina
- Species: N. domingensis

Binomial name
- Narvalina domingensis (Cass.) Less. (1832)

Synonyms
- Needhamia domingensis Cass.

= Narvalina domingensis =

Species of flowering plant

Narvalina domingensis is a species of flowering plant in the family Asteraceae. It is endemic to the island of Hispaniola (the Dominican Republic and Haiti).
