= Dicranocarpus =

Scientific classification
- Kingdom: Plantae
- Clade: Tracheophytes
- Clade: Angiosperms
- Clade: Eudicots
- Clade: Asterids
- Order: Asterales
- Family: Asteraceae
- Subfamily: Asteroideae
- Tribe: Coreopsideae
- Genus: Dicranocarpus; A.Gray
- Species: D. parviflorus

Binomial name
- Dicranocarpus parviflorus A.Gray

Synonyms
- Heterosperma dicranocarpum A.Gray; Dicranocarpus dicranocarpus (A.Gray) Wooton & Standl., illegitimate tautonym

Genus of flowering plants

Dicranocarpus is a genus of flowering plants in the daisy family.

There is only one known species, Dicranocarpus parviflorus, native to Mexico (Coahuila, Durango, Nuevo León, Zacatecas, San Luis Potosí) and the United States (New Mexico, western Texas).
