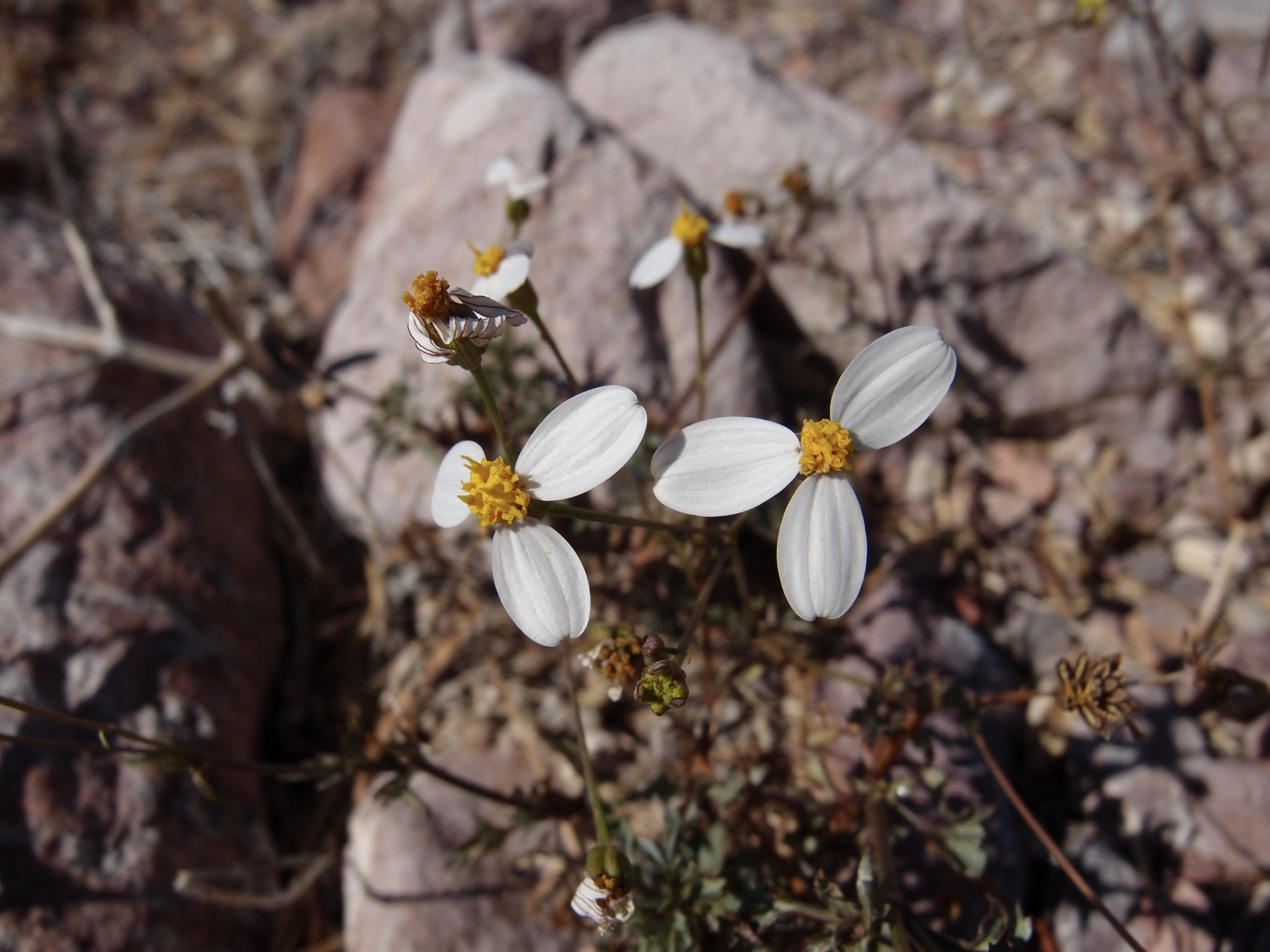
- Coreocrpus sonoranus

Scientific classification
- Kingdom: Plantae
- Clade: Tracheophytes
- Clade: Angiosperms
- Clade: Eudicots
- Clade: Asterids
- Order: Asterales
- Family: Asteraceae
- Subfamily: Asteroideae
- Tribe: Coreopsideae
- Genus: Coreocarpus; Benth.

Type species
- Coreocarpus parthenioides Benth.

Synonyms
- Acoma Benth.

= Coreocarpus =

Genus of plants

Coreocarpus is a genus of flowering plants in the family Asteraceae native to northwestern Mexico and southern Arizona.

Species

- Coreocarpus arizonicus (A.Gray) S.F.Blake Arizona (Pima, Santa Cruz, Cochise Counties), Sonora, Sinaloa, Chihuahua, Baja California Sur
- Coreocarpus congregatus (S.F.Blake) E.B.Sm. - Sinaloa
- Coreocarpus dissectus (Benth.) S.F.Blake - Baja California Sur
- Coreocarpus ixtapanus B.L.Turner - México State
- Coreocarpus parthenioides Benth. - Baja California Sur
- Coreocarpus sonoranus Sherff - Sonora
