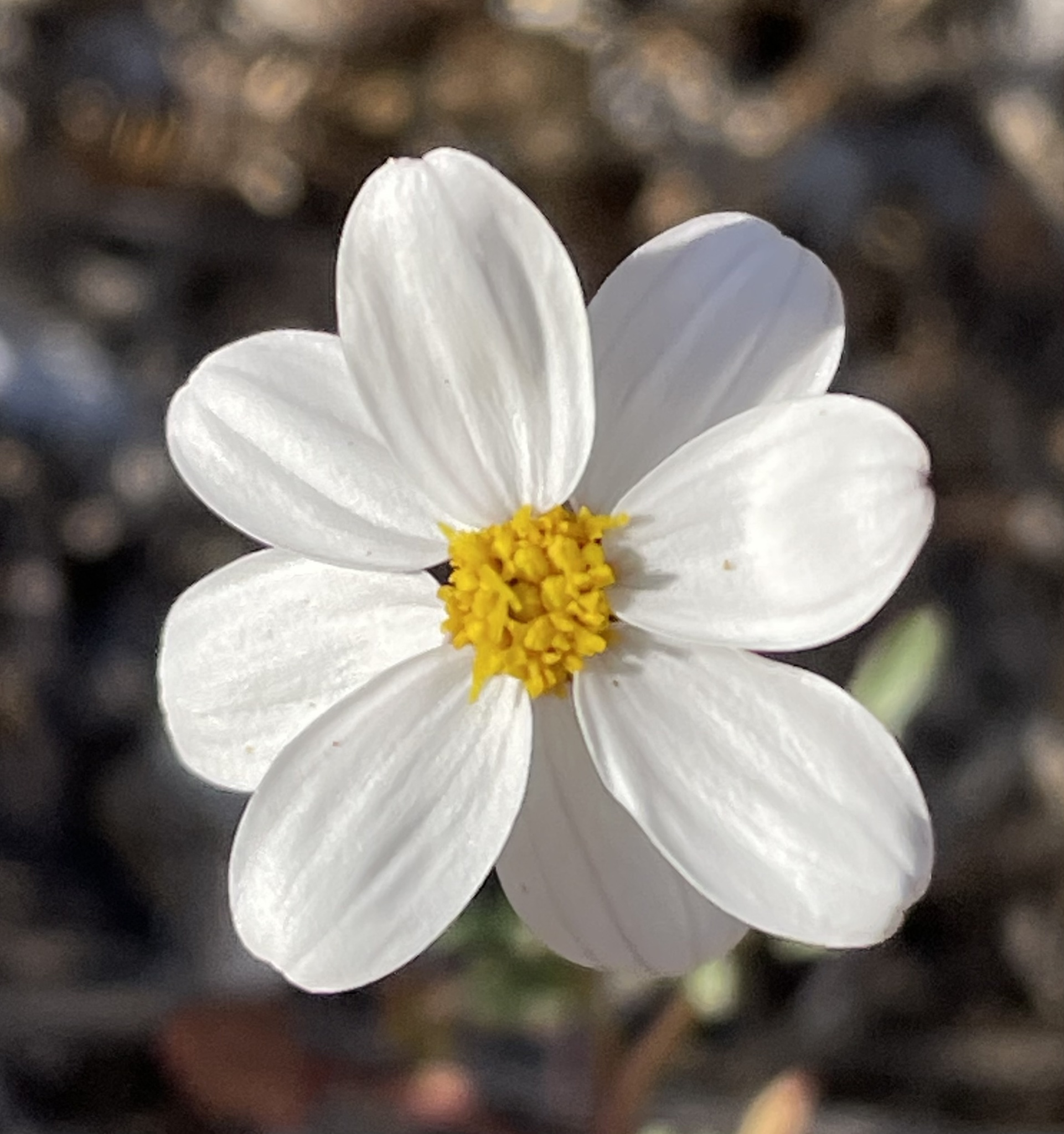
- Coreocarpus parthenioides var. parthenioides

Scientific classification
- Kingdom: Plantae
- Clade: Tracheophytes
- Clade: Angiosperms
- Clade: Eudicots
- Clade: Asterids
- Order: Asterales
- Family: Asteraceae
- Genus: Coreocarpus
- Species: C. parthenioides

Binomial name
- Coreocarpus parthenioides Benth.

Synonyms
- Leptosyne parthenioides (Benth.) A.Gray

= Coreocarpus parthenioides =

Species of flowering plant

Coreocarpus parthenioides is a species of flowering plant in the family Asteraceae. It is found from northwest Mexico. It has 3 varieties: var. parthenioides, var. heterocarpus and var. involutus.

== Taxonomy ==
Coreocarpus parthenioides was first named and described in 1844 by George Bentham.

=== Varieties ===
As of August 2023, Plants of the World Online accepts 3 varieties of this taxon:

- Coreocarpus parthenioides var. parthenioides
- Coreocarpus parthenioides var. heterocarpus S.F.Blake
- Coreocarpus parthenioides var. involutus (Greene) E.B.Sm.
