= Coreopsis buchii =

Scientific classification
- Kingdom: Plantae
- Clade: Tracheophytes
- Clade: Angiosperms
- Clade: Eudicots
- Clade: Asterids
- Order: Asterales
- Family: Asteraceae
- Subfamily: Asteroideae
- Tribe: Coreopsideae
- Genus: Coreopsis
- Species: C. buchii

Binomial name
- Coreopsis buchii (Urb.) S.F.Blake

Synonyms
- Selleophytum buchii Urb.

Genus of plants

Coreopsis buchii is a species of flowering plant in the tickseed tribe within the daisy family. It is endemic to the island of Hispaniola (the Dominican Republic and Haiti).

The species was first described by Ignatz Urban in 1915 as Selleophytum buchii, the sole species in genus Selleophytum. In 1924 Sidney Fay Blake placed the species in genus Coreopsis as Coreopsis buchii.
