= Henricksonia =

Scientific classification
- Kingdom: Plantae
- Clade: Embryophytes
- Clade: Tracheophytes
- Clade: Angiosperms
- Clade: Eudicots
- Clade: Asterids
- Order: Asterales
- Family: Asteraceae
- Subfamily: Asteroideae
- Tribe: Coreopsideae
- Genus: Henricksonia; B.L.Turner
- Species: H. mexicana

Binomial name
- Henricksonia mexicana B.L.Turner

Genus of plants

Henricksonia is a genus of flowering plants in the daisy family.

== Species ==
There is only one known species, Henricksonia mexicana, native to the state of Durango in Mexico.
