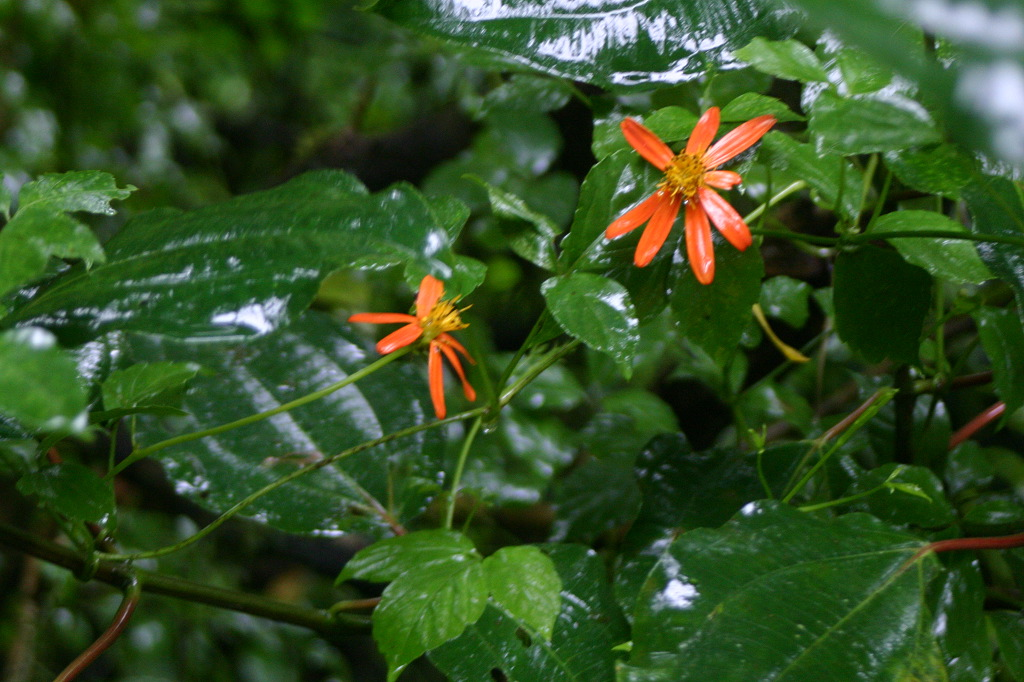
- Hidalgoa ternata Monteverde Cloud Forest Reserve, Costa Rica.

Scientific classification
- Kingdom: Plantae
- Clade: Tracheophytes
- Clade: Angiosperms
- Clade: Eudicots
- Clade: Asterids
- Order: Asterales
- Family: Asteraceae
- Subfamily: Asteroideae
- Tribe: Coreopsideae
- Genus: Hidalgoa; La Llave

Species
- See text

= Hidalgoa =

Genus of flowering plants

Hidalgoa is a genus in the tribe Coreopsideae of the family Asteraceae.

Its species are native to tropical habitats in southern Mexico, Central America and northwestern South America.

== Selected species ==
Named species of Hidalgoa include:

- Hidalgoa ternata La Llave — endemic to Costa Rica.
- Hidalgoa uspanapa B.L.Turner — Mexico.
- Hidalgoa wercklei Hook.

=== Previous species classifications ===
Previously used botanical names for the species Hidalgoa ternata include:

- Hidalgoa breedlovei Sherff — Mexico.
- Hidalgoa lessingii DC. — Mexico.
- Hidalgoa pentamera Sherf — Mexico.
- Hidalgoa steyermarkii Sherff
- Melampodium hidalgoa DC.
- Melampodium ternatum Sherff
