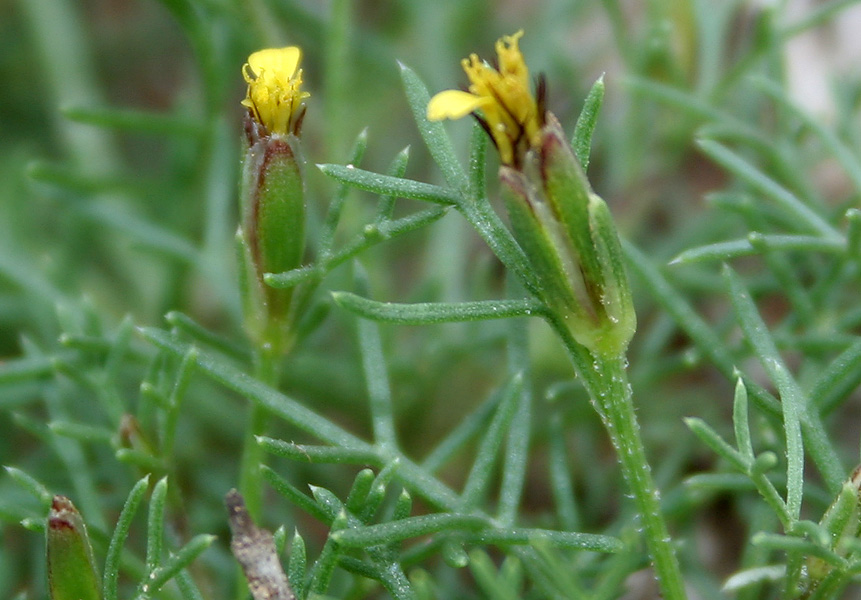
- Glossocardia bosvallia

Scientific classification
- Kingdom: Plantae
- Clade: Tracheophytes
- Clade: Angiosperms
- Clade: Eudicots
- Clade: Asterids
- Order: Asterales
- Family: Asteraceae
- Subfamily: Asteroideae
- Tribe: Coreopsideae
- Genus: Glossocardia; Cass.

Type species
- Glossocardia linearifolia Cass.

Synonyms
- Gynactis Cass.; Gymnactis Pfeiff.; Glossogyne Cass.; Kerneria subg. Glossogyne Cass.; Guerreroia Merr.

= Glossocardia =

Genus of flowering plants

Glossocardia is a genus of flowering plants in the daisy family. It is native to Asia and Australia.

These are perennial herbs with large caudices and toothed ray florets.

== Species ==
- Glossocardia alorensis Veldkamp & Kreffer - Indonesia (Lesser Sunda Islands)
- Glossocardia bidens (Retz.) Veldkamp - Asia; Australia
- Glossocardia bosvallia (L.f.) DC. - India
- Glossocardia calva (Sch.Bip. ex Miq.) Veldkamp - insular Southeast Asia
- Glossocardia condorensis (Gagnep.) Veldkamp - Vietnam
- Glossocardia integrifolia (Gagnep.) Veldkamp - Laos
- Glossocardia josephinae Veldkamp & Kreffer - Indonesia (Lesser Sunda Islands)
- Glossocardia leschenaultii (Cass.) Veldkamp - Indonesia (Madura)
- Glossocardia orthochaeta (F.Muell.) Veldkamp - Australia (Queensland)
- Glossocardia refracta Veldkamp - Australia (Queensland)
- Glossocardia smithii (Backer) Veldkamp - Indonesia (Java)
- Glossocardia tridentata (Turcz.) Veldkamp - Philippines
