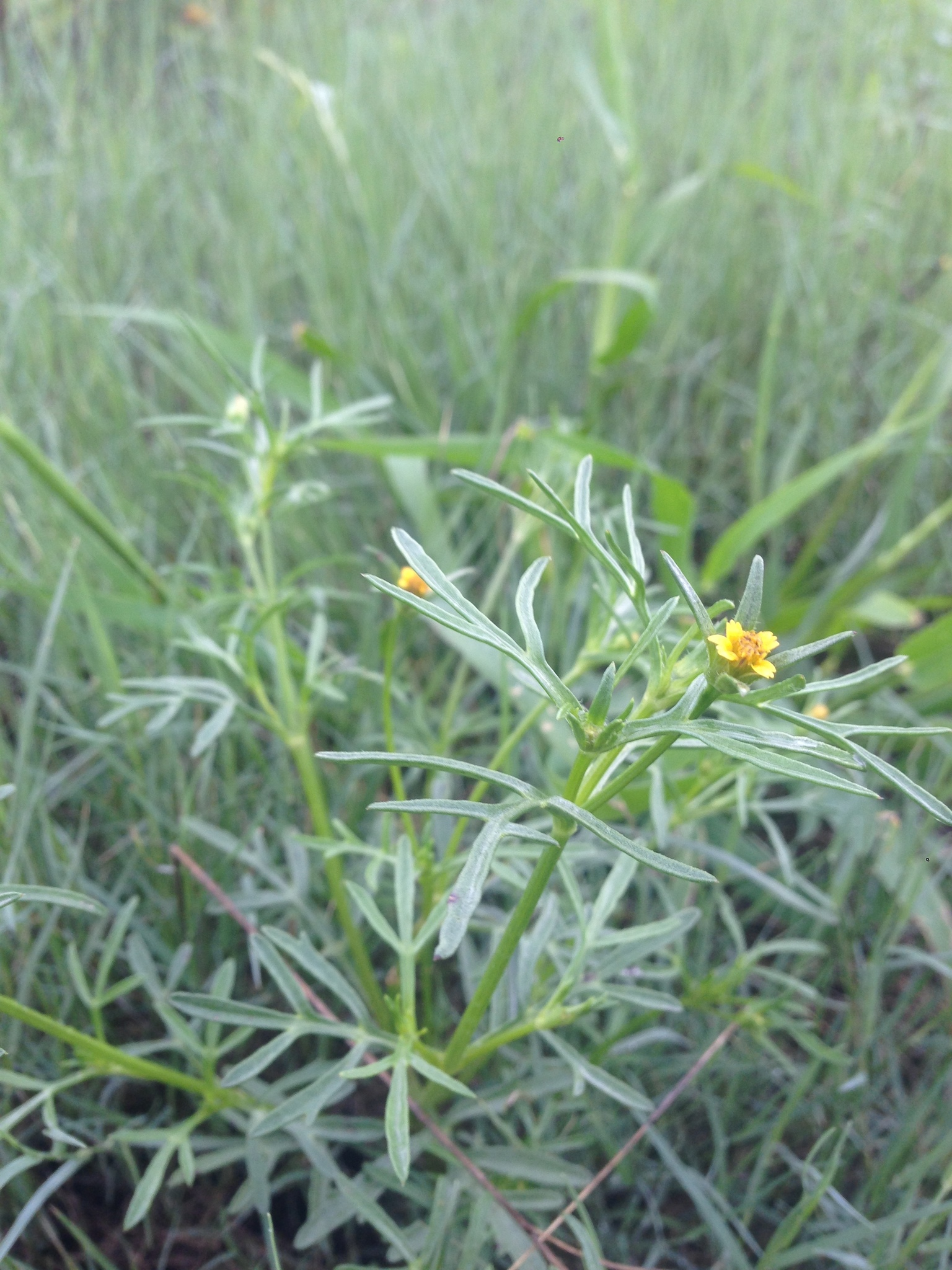

Conservation status
- Secure (NatureServe)

Scientific classification
- Kingdom: Plantae
- Clade: Tracheophytes
- Clade: Angiosperms
- Clade: Eudicots
- Clade: Asterids
- Order: Asterales
- Family: Asteraceae
- Genus: Heterosperma
- Species: H. pinnatum

Binomial name
- Heterosperma pinnatum Cav. 1796

Synonyms
- Heterosperma pinnata Cav.; Heterosperma tagetinum A.Gray

= Heterosperma pinnatum =

Species of flowering plant

Heterosperma pinnatum, the wingpetal, is a New World species of plants in the family Asteraceae. It has a discontinuous distribution in North and South America, having been found in Bolivia, Venezuela, Mexico, Guatemala, Honduras, and the south-western United States (Arizona, New Mexico, western Texas, and southern Colorado).
