= Koehneola =

Scientific classification
- Kingdom: Plantae
- Clade: Tracheophytes
- Clade: Angiosperms
- Clade: Eudicots
- Clade: Asterids
- Order: Asterales
- Family: Asteraceae
- Subfamily: Asteroideae
- Tribe: Coreopsideae
- Genus: Koehneola; Urb.
- Species: K. repens

Binomial name
- Koehneola repens (O.Hoffm.) Urb.

Synonyms
- Microcoecia repens Griseb. Pinillosia repens Benth. & Hook.f. Tetranthus repens O.Hoffm.

Genus of flowering plants

Koehneola is a monotypic genus of flowering plants in the daisy family. There is only one known species, Koehneola repens.

It is native to Cuba.

The genus name of Koehneola is in honour of Bernhard Adalbert Emil Koehne (1848–1918), a German botanist and dendrologist born near Striegau, a town known today as Strzegom, Poland, The Latin specific epithet of repens means creeping or crawling. Both genus and species were described and published in Symb. Antill. Vol.2 on pages 463–464 in 1901.
