= Epilepis rudis =

Scientific classification
- Kingdom: Plantae
- Clade: Tracheophytes
- Clade: Angiosperms
- Clade: Eudicots
- Clade: Asterids
- Order: Asterales
- Family: Asteraceae
- Genus: Epilepis
- Species: E. rudis

Binomial name
- Epilepis rudis (Benth.)

Synonyms
- Coreopsis rudis (Benth.) Benth. & Hook.f. ex Hemsl.; Gymnolomia rudis (Benth.) A.Gray; Pseudoagarista rudis (Benth.) Mesfin & D.J.Crawford

Species of flowering plant

Epilepis rudis is a species of flowering plant in the Asteraceae family. It is endemic to west-central Mexico, and primarily grows in the "subtropical biome".
