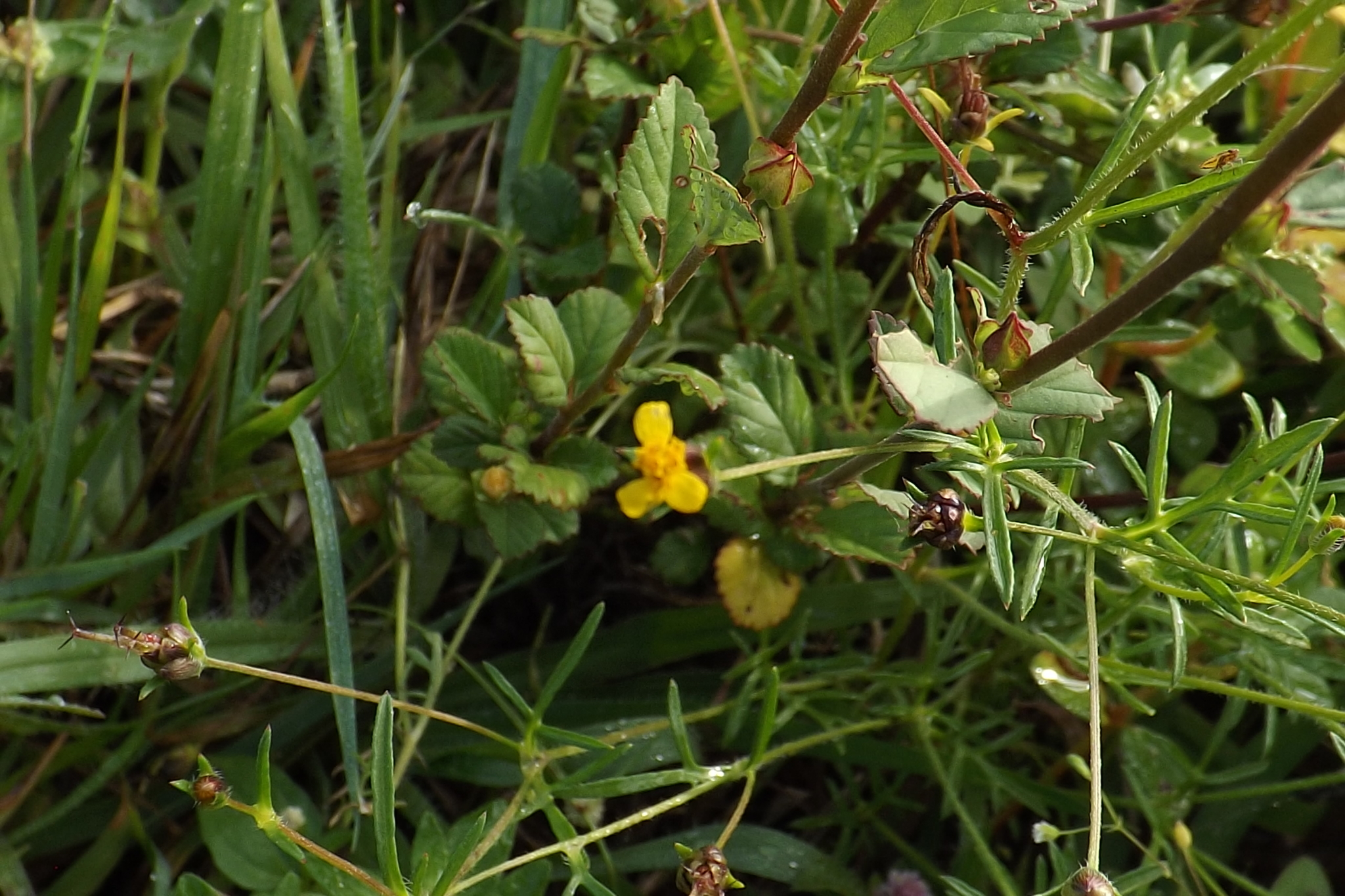
- Heterosperma pinnatum

Scientific classification
- Kingdom: Plantae
- Clade: Tracheophytes
- Clade: Angiosperms
- Clade: Eudicots
- Clade: Asterids
- Order: Asterales
- Family: Asteraceae
- Subfamily: Asteroideae
- Tribe: Coreopsideae
- Genus: Heterosperma; Cav.

Type species
- Heterosperma pinnata Cav.

Synonyms
- Heterospermum Willd., alternate spelling; Microdonta Nutt.

= Heterosperma =

Genus of flowering plants

Heterosperma is a genus of flowering plants in the sunflower family, native to North and South America.

Species

- Heterosperma achaetum S.F.Blake - Colombia
- Heterosperma diversifolium Kunth - Bolivia, Peru, Argentina, Ecuador
- Heterosperma nanum (Nutt.) Sherff - Bolivia, Peru, Argentina, Chile
- Heterosperma ovatifolium Cav. - Bolivia, Peru, Argentina, Chile
- Heterosperma pinnatum Cav. - Mesoamerica, United States (Arizona, New Mexico, Texas, Colorado), Bolivia, Venezuela
- Heterosperma tenuisectum (Griseb.) Cabrera - Bolivia, Peru, Argentina
- Heterosperma xanti A.Gray - Mexico (Baja California Sur)
