= Goldmanella =

Scientific classification
- Kingdom: Plantae
- Clade: Tracheophytes
- Clade: Angiosperms
- Clade: Eudicots
- Clade: Asterids
- Order: Asterales
- Family: Asteraceae
- Subfamily: Asteroideae
- Tribe: Coreopsideae
- Genus: Goldmanella; Greenm.
- Species: G. sarmentosa

Binomial name
- Goldmanella sarmentosa (Greenm.) Greenm.

Synonyms
- Goldmania Greenm.; Caleopsis Fedde; Goldmania sarmentosa Greenm.; Caleopsis sarmentosa (Greenm.) Fedde

Genus of flowering plants

Goldmanella is a genus of flowering plants in the daisy family.

Species

There is only one known species, Goldmanella sarmentosa, native to Belize, Guatemala, Chiapas, Tabasco, and the Yucatán Peninsula.
