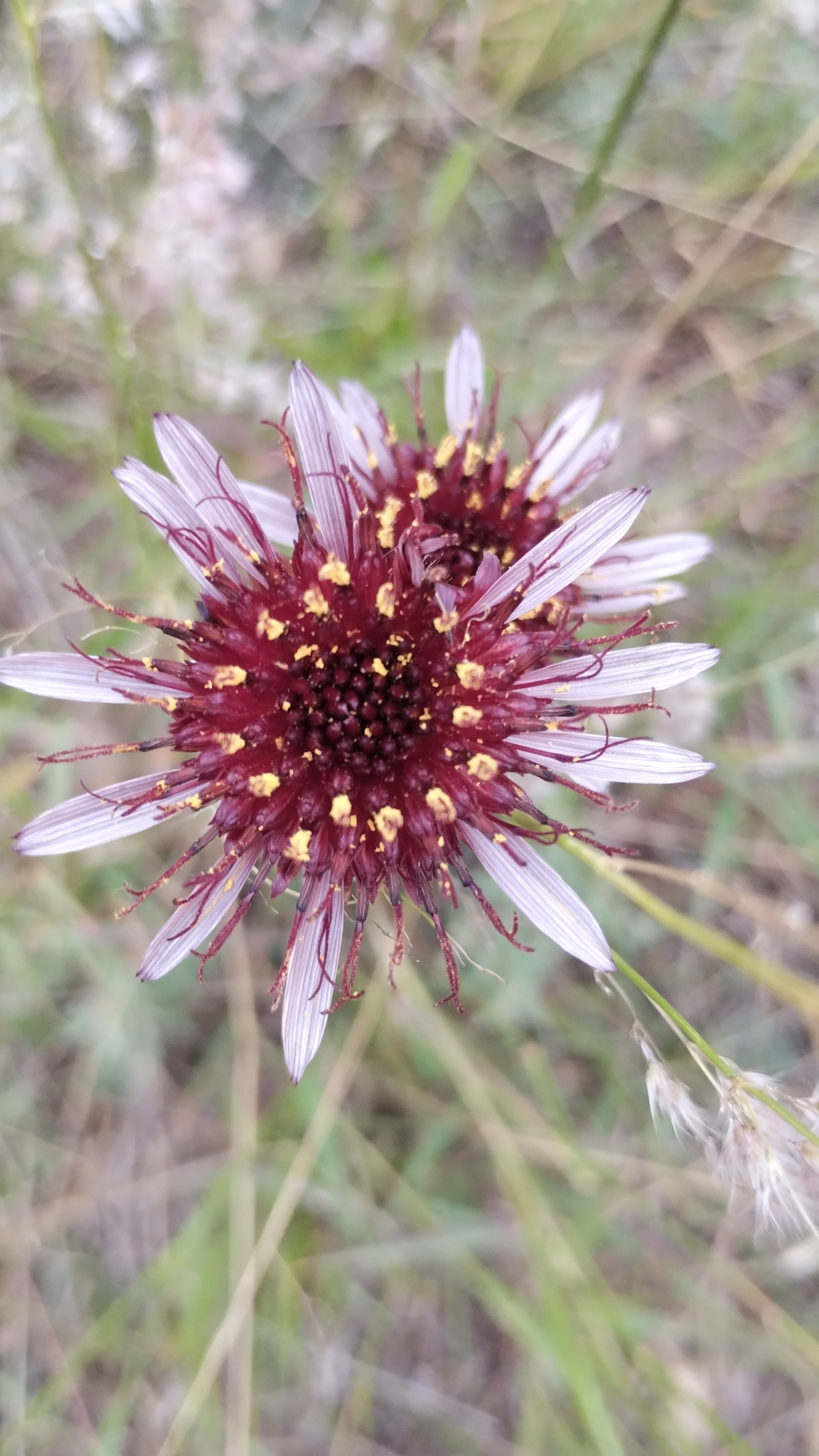
- Isostigma peucedanifolium in Argentina

Scientific classification
- Kingdom: Plantae
- Clade: Embryophytes
- Clade: Tracheophytes
- Clade: Spermatophytes
- Clade: Angiosperms
- Clade: Eudicots
- Clade: Asterids
- Order: Asterales
- Family: Asteraceae
- Subfamily: Asteroideae
- Tribe: Coreopsideae
- Genus: Isostigma; Less.

Type species
- Isostigma simplicifolium Less.

Synonyms
- Tragoceras Spreng.

= Isostigma =

Genus of flowering plants

Isostigma is a genus of South American flowering plants in the daisy family.

Species

- Isostigma acaule (Baker) Chodat
- Isostigma cordobense Cabrera
- Isostigma crithmifolium Less.
- Isostigma dissitifolium Baker
- Isostigma herzogii Hassl.
- Isostigma hoffmannii Kuntze
- Isostigma microcephalum Baker
- Isostigma molfinianum Sherff
- Isostigma peucedanifolium (Spreng.) Less.
- Isostigma riedelii (Baker) Chodat
- Isostigma scorzoneraefolium (Baker) Sherff
- Isostigma speciosum Less.
