= Ericentrodea =

Scientific classification
- Kingdom: Plantae
- Clade: Embryophytes
- Clade: Tracheophytes
- Clade: Spermatophytes
- Clade: Angiosperms
- Clade: Eudicots
- Clade: Asterids
- Order: Asterales
- Family: Asteraceae
- Subfamily: Asteroideae
- Tribe: Coreopsideae
- Genus: Ericentrodea; S.F.Blake & Sherff

Genus of flowering plants

Ericentrodea is a genus of South American flowering plants in the family Asteraceae.

Species

- Ericentrodea corazonensis (Hieron.) S.F.Blake & Sherff - Colombia, Ecuador
- Ericentrodea davidsmithii H.Rob. - Bolivia
- Ericentrodea decomposita S.F.Blake & Sherff - Peru
- Ericentrodea homogama (Hieron.) S.F.Blake & Sherff - Ecuador
- Ericentrodea mirabilis (Sherff) S.F.Blake & Sherff - Ecuador
- Ericentrodea ramirezii H.Rob. & S.Díaz - Colombia
