= Tetraperone =

Scientific classification
- Kingdom: Plantae
- Clade: Embryophytes
- Clade: Tracheophytes
- Clade: Angiosperms
- Clade: Eudicots
- Clade: Asterids
- Order: Asterales
- Family: Asteraceae
- Subfamily: Asteroideae
- Tribe: Coreopsideae
- Genus: Tetraperone; Urb.
- Species: T. bellioides

Binomial name
- Tetraperone bellioides (Griseb.) Urb.

Synonyms
- Pinillosia bellioides Griseb.

Genus of plants

Tetraperone is a genus of flowering plants in the cosmos tribe within the daisy family.

Species

The only known species is Tetraperone bellioides, native to Cuba.
