= Epilepis =

Scientific classification
- Kingdom: Plantae
- Clade: Tracheophytes
- Clade: Angiosperms
- Clade: Eudicots
- Clade: Asterids
- Order: Asterales
- Family: Asteraceae
- Subfamily: Asteroideae
- Tribe: Coreopsideae
- Genus: Epilepis; Benth.

Synonyms
- Pseudoagarista Mesfin & D.J.Crawford

Genus of flowering plants

Epilepis is a genus of flowering plant in the Asteraceae family. It includes 11 species native to Mexico.

== Species ==
11 species are accepted.

- Epilepis crawfordii (Mesfin) Z.H.Feng, Z.J.Huang & Su Liu
- Epilepis davilae (Panero & Villaseñor) Z.H.Feng, Z.J.Huang & Su Liu
- Epilepis guanajuatensis (B.L.Turner) Z.H.Feng, Z.J.Huang & Su Liu
- Epilepis mcvaughii (D.J.Crawford) Z.H.Feng, Z.J.Huang & Su Liu
- Epilepis oaxacensis (B.L.Turner) Z.H.Feng, Z.J.Huang & Su Liu
- Epilepis petrophila (A.Gray) Z.H.Feng, Z.J.Huang & Su Liu
- Epilepis petrophiloides (B.L.Rob. & Greenm.) Z.H.Feng, Z.J.Huang & Su Liu
- Epilepis pringlei (B.L.Rob.) Z.H.Feng, Z.J.Huang & Su Liu
- Epilepis queretarensis (B.L.Turner) Z.H.Feng, Z.J.Huang & Su Liu
- Epilepis rhyacophila (Greenm.) Z.H.Feng, Z.J.Huang & Su Liu
- Epilepis rudis Benth.
