= Ericentrodea homogama =

Conservation status
- Near Threatened (IUCN 3.1)

Scientific classification
- Kingdom: Plantae
- Clade: Tracheophytes
- Clade: Angiosperms
- Clade: Eudicots
- Clade: Asterids
- Order: Asterales
- Family: Asteraceae
- Genus: Ericentrodea
- Species: E. homogama

Binomial name
- Ericentrodea homogama S.F.Blake & Sherff

Species of flowering plant

Ericentrodea homogama is a species of flowering plant in the family Asteraceae. It is found only in Ecuador, where its natural habitat is subtropical or tropical moist montane forests. It is threatened by habitat loss.
