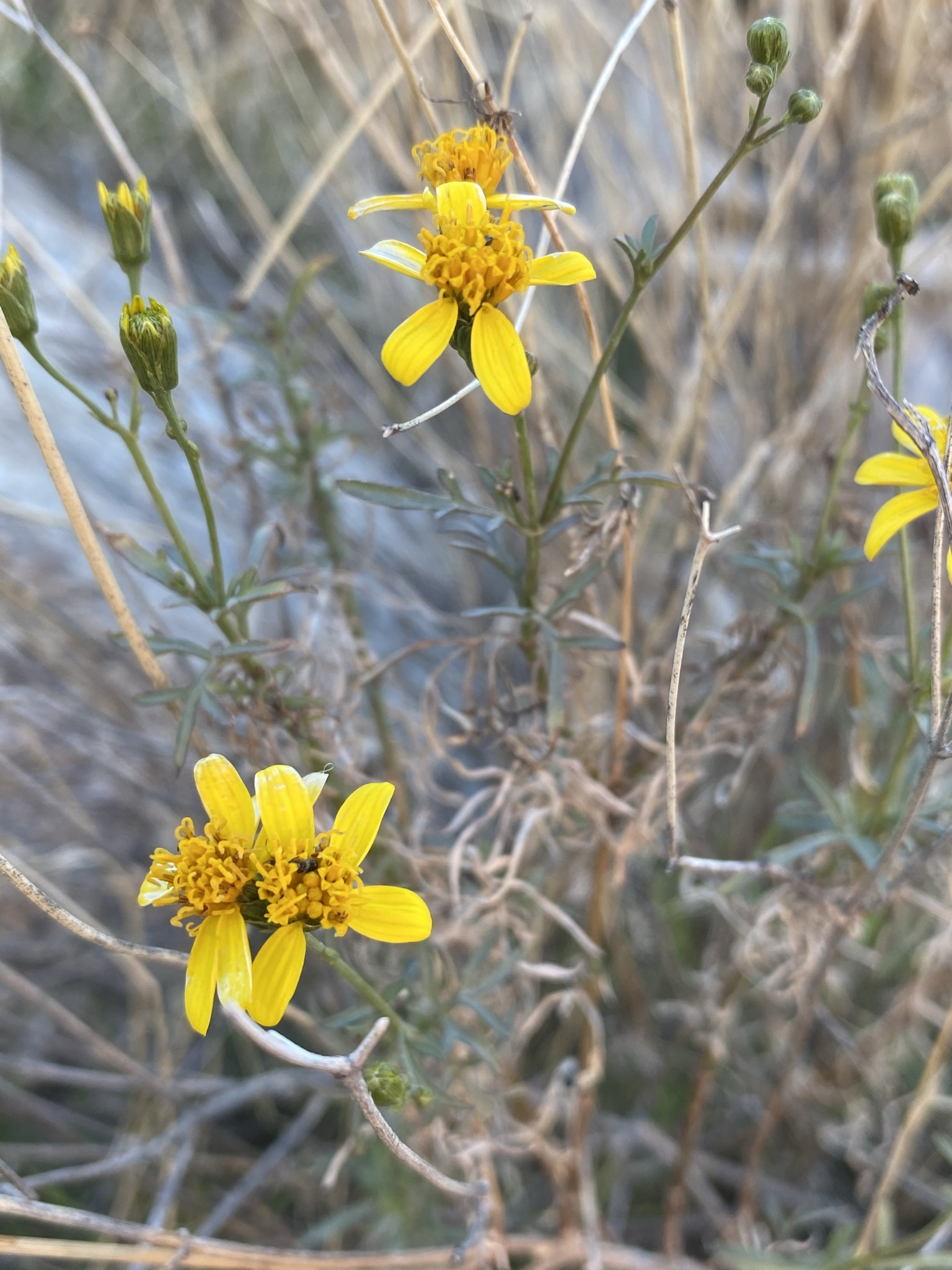

Scientific classification
- Kingdom: Plantae
- Clade: Tracheophytes
- Clade: Angiosperms
- Clade: Eudicots
- Clade: Asterids
- Order: Asterales
- Family: Asteraceae
- Genus: Coreocarpus
- Species: C. arizonicus

Binomial name
- Coreocarpus arizonicus (A.Gray) S.F.Blake

Synonyms
- Coreopsis arizonica (A.Gray) O.Hoffm.; Leptosyne arizonica A.Gray; Coreocarpus sanpedroensis E.B.Sm., syn of var. sanpedroensis

= Coreocarpus arizonicus =

Species of plant

Coreocarpus arizonicus, the little lemonhead, is a North American species of flowering plants in the daisy family native to northwestern Mexico and the southwestern United States. It has been found in southern Arizona (Pima, Santa Cruz, Cochise Counties), and in the adjacent Mexican States of Sonora, Chihuahua, Sinaloa, and Baja California Sur.

Coreocarpus arizonicus is a branching perennial subshrub up to 120 cm (48 inches) tall. The plant usually produces several flower heads, each head having yellow disc florets and white, purplish, yellow, or orange ray florets. Sometimes the ray florets are missing. The species grows in open sites along streams and in mountain canyons.

Varieties

- Coreocarpus arizonicus var. arizonicus - Arizona, Sonora, Chihuahua, Baja California Sur
- Coreocarpus arizonicus var. filiformis (Greenm.) S.F.Blake - Sinaloa
- Coreocarpus arizonicus var. macrophyllus Sherff - Chihuahua
- Coreocarpus arizonicus var. pubescens (B.L.Rob. & Fernald) S.F.Blake - Sonora
- Coreocarpus arizonicus var. sanpedroensis (E.B.Sm.) B.L.Turner - Sonora
