= Chrysanthellum =

Scientific classification
- Kingdom: Plantae
- Clade: Embryophytes
- Clade: Tracheophytes
- Clade: Spermatophytes
- Clade: Angiosperms
- Clade: Eudicots
- Clade: Asterids
- Order: Asterales
- Family: Asteraceae
- Subfamily: Asteroideae
- Tribe: Coreopsideae
- Genus: Chrysanthellum; Rich. in Pers.

Type species
- Chrysanthellum procumbens Rich. ex Pers.

Synonyms
- Adenocarpum D.Don ex Hook. & Arn.; Adenospermum Hook. & Arn.; Eryngiophyllum Greenm.; Sebastiana Benth. & Hook.f.; Chrysanthellina Cass.; Collaea Spreng.

Genus of plants

Chrysanthellum is a genus of flowering plants in the aster family.

== Species ==
As of 1988;

- Chrysanthellum americanum (L.) Vatke - Central America, West Indies, Chiapas; naturalized in parts of Asia, Africa, South America
- Chrysanthellum filiforme McVaugh - Michoacán
- Chrysanthellum indicum DC.
- Chrysanthellum integrifolium Steetz - Central America, southern Mexico
- Chrysanthellum involutum Paul G.Wilson - Guerrero, México State
- Chrysanthellum keilii B.L.Turner - Michoacán
- Chrysanthellum michoacanum B.L.Turner - Michoacán
- Chrysanthellum perennans B.L.Turner - Oaxaca
- Chrysanthellum pilzii Strother - Oaxaca
- Chrysanthellum pusillum Hook.f. - Galápagos
- Chrysanthellum tamaulipense B.L.Turner - Tamaulipas

Kew also accepts;

- Chrysanthellum fagerlindii Eliasson - Galápagos
- Chrysanthellum pinnatisectum (Paul G.Wilson) Veldkamp - Guerrero, Mexico
- Chrysanthellum rosei (Greenm.) Veldkamp - (Sinaloa, Durango), Mexico
