= Cyathomone =

Conservation status
- Data Deficient (IUCN 3.1)

Scientific classification
- Kingdom: Plantae
- Clade: Tracheophytes
- Clade: Angiosperms
- Clade: Eudicots
- Clade: Asterids
- Order: Asterales
- Family: Asteraceae
- Subfamily: Asteroideae
- Tribe: Coreopsideae
- Genus: Cyathomone; S.F.Blake
- Species: C. sodiroi

Binomial name
- Cyathomone sodiroi (Hieron.) S.F.Blake

Synonyms
- Narvalina sodiroi Hieron.

Genus of flowering plants

Cyathomone sodiroi is a species of flowering plant in the family Asteraceae, and the only member of the genus Cyathomone. It is found only in Ecuador, where it lives in subtropical or tropical moist montane forests, and it is threatened by habitat loss.
