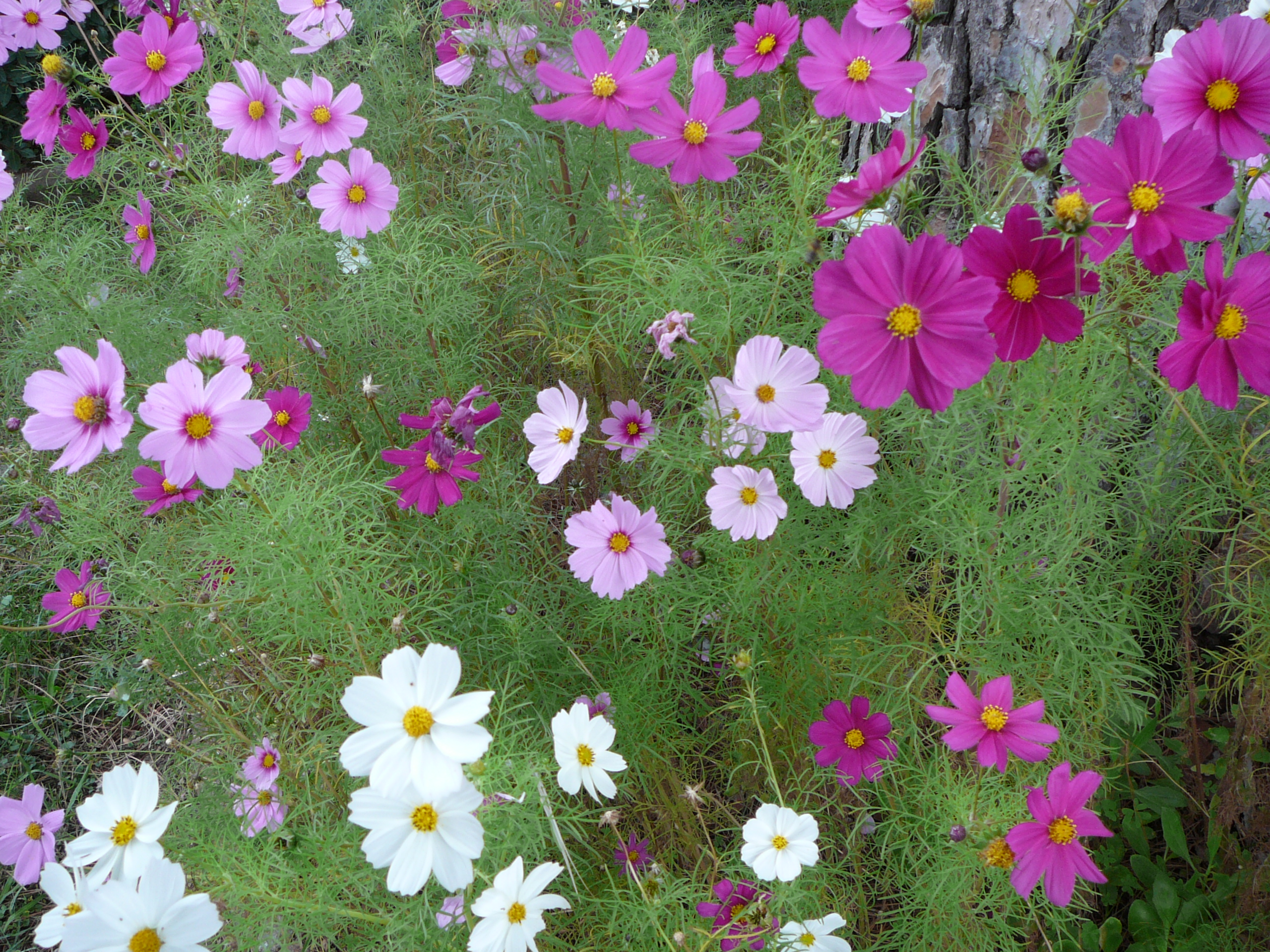
- Cosmos bipinnatus field

Scientific classification
- Kingdom: Plantae
- Clade: Tracheophytes
- Clade: Angiosperms
- Clade: Eudicots
- Clade: Asterids
- Order: Asterales
- Family: Asteraceae
- Subfamily: Asteroideae
- Tribe: Coreopsideae (Less.) Lindl.

Genera
- See text

= Coreopsideae =

Tribe of plants

Coreopsideae is a tribe of flowering plants belonging to the Asteroideae subfamily. It includes widely cultivated genera such as Coreopsis, after which the tribe is named, as well as Cosmos and Dahlia.

A similar group has been recognized since 1829, generally as part of the tribe Heliantheae (Cassini, 1819). In the late 20th century, molecular studies caused a slightly redefined version of this group to be recognized as its own tribe, Coreopsideae. The larger version of Heliantheae was split into tribes including Bahieae, Chaenactideae, Coreopsideae, Helenieae and, finally, Heliantheae (sensu stricto). Within the tribe, the traditional definition of genera based on flower and fruit characters does not reflect evolutionary relationships as inferred through molecular phylogenetics.

The tribe is characterized by shiny green bracts at the base of the flower head in two rows: an inner row of tightly spaced bracts and an outer row of a smaller number pointing downward. It includes five genera that use C_{4} carbon fixation: Chrysanthellum, Eryngiophyllum, Glossocardia (including Guerreroia), Isostigma, and Neuractis. These genera are thought to share a common ancestor and thus a single origin of C_{4} carbon fixation.

== Genera ==
The 27 Coreopsideae genera recognized by the Global Compositae Database as of March 2025:

- Bidens L.
- Chrysanthellum Rich.
- Coreocarpus Benth.
- Coreopsis L.
- Cosmos Cav.
- Cyathomone S.F.Blake
- Dahlia Cav.
- Dicranocarpus A.Gray
- Diodontium F.Muell.
- Ericentrodea S.F.Blake
- Fitchia Hook.f.
- Glossocardia Cass.
- Goldmanella Greenm.
- Henricksonia B.L.Turner
- Heterosperma Cav.
- Hidalgoa La Llave
- Isostigma Less.
- Koehneola Urb.
- Moonia Arn.
- Narvalina Cass.
- Oparanthus Sherff
- Petrobium R.Br.
- Pinillosia Ossa ex DC.
- Selleophytum Urb.
- Tetraperone Urb.
- Thelesperma Less.
- Trioncinia (F.Muell.) Veldkamp

Plants of the World Online accepts the genera Anacis Schrank,Electranthera Mesfin, D.J.Crawford & Pruski, Epilepis Benth., Leptosyne DC., and Silphidium (Torr. & A.Gray) Mesfin & D.J.Crawford, and treats Selleophytum as a synonym of Coreopsis.
