= Barroetea =

Scientific classification
- Kingdom: Plantae
- Clade: Embryophytes
- Clade: Tracheophytes
- Clade: Angiosperms
- Clade: Eudicots
- Clade: Asterids
- Order: Asterales
- Family: Asteraceae
- Subfamily: Asteroideae
- Tribe: Eupatorieae
- Genus: Barroetea; A.Gray

Type species
- Barroetea setosa A.Gray

Genus of flowering plants

Barroetea is a genus of flowering plants in the family Asteraceae.

Species

All the species are endemic to Mexico.

- Barroetea brevipes B.L.Rob. - Oaxaca
- Barroetea laxiflora Brandegee - Puebla
- Barroetea pavonii A.Gray - Michoacán, Mexico State, Guerrero, Oaxaca, Puebla
- Barroetea sessilifolia Greenm. - Morelos
- Barroetea setosa A.Gray - San Luis Potosí
- Barroetea subuligera A.Gray - from Chihuahua + Tamaulipas to Guerrero
