= Siapaea =

Scientific classification
- Kingdom: Plantae
- Clade: Tracheophytes
- Clade: Angiosperms
- Clade: Eudicots
- Clade: Asterids
- Order: Asterales
- Family: Asteraceae
- Subfamily: Asteroideae
- Tribe: Eupatorieae
- Genus: Siapaea; Pruski
- Species: S. liesneri

Binomial name
- Siapaea liesneri Pruski

Genus of plants

Siapaea is a genus of plants in the tribe Eupatorieae within the family Asteraceae.

== Species ==
The only known species is Siapaea liesneri, native to the State of Amazonas in southern Venezuela.
