= Parapiqueria =

Scientific classification
- Kingdom: Plantae
- Clade: Embryophytes
- Clade: Tracheophytes
- Clade: Angiosperms
- Clade: Eudicots
- Clade: Asterids
- Order: Asterales
- Family: Asteraceae
- Subfamily: Asteroideae
- Tribe: Eupatorieae
- Genus: Parapiqueria; R.M.King & H.Rob
- Species: P. cavalcantei

Binomial name
- Parapiqueria cavalcantei R.M.King & H.Rob

Genus of flowering plants

Parapiqueria is a genus of Brazilian plants in the tribe Eupatorieae within the family Asteraceae.

Species

The only known species is Parapiqueria cavalcantei, native to the State of Pará in northern Brazil.
