= Lasiolaena =

Scientific classification
- Kingdom: Plantae
- Clade: Tracheophytes
- Clade: Angiosperms
- Clade: Eudicots
- Clade: Asterids
- Order: Asterales
- Family: Asteraceae
- Subfamily: Asteroideae
- Tribe: Eupatorieae
- Genus: Lasiolaena; R.M.King & H.Rob.

Type species
- Eupatorium blanchetii Sch.Bip. ex Baker

Genus of flowering plants

Lasiolaena is a genus of Brazilian flowering plants in the family Asteraceae.

Species

All the known species are native to the State of Bahia in eastern Brazil.

- Lasiolaena blanchetii (Sch.Bip. ex Baker) R.M.King & H.Rob.
- Lasiolaena carvalhoi D.J.N.Hind
- Lasiolaena duartei R.M.King & H.Rob.
- Lasiolaena lychnophorioides Roque, S.C.Ferreira & H.Rob.
- Lasiolaena morii R.M.King & H.Rob.
- Lasiolaena pereirae R.M.King & H.Rob.
- Lasiolaena santosii R.M.King & H.Rob.
