= Bishovia =

Scientific classification
- Kingdom: Plantae
- Clade: Embryophytes
- Clade: Tracheophytes
- Clade: Angiosperms
- Clade: Eudicots
- Clade: Asterids
- Order: Asterales
- Family: Asteraceae
- Subfamily: Asteroideae
- Tribe: Eupatorieae
- Genus: Bishovia; R.M. King & H. Rob.

Genus of flowering plants

Bishovia is a genus of flowering plants in the family Asteraceae.

Genus is named for Dr. Luther Earl Bishop.

Species

- Bishovia boliviensis R.M.King & H.Rob. - Bolivia
- Bishovia mikaniifolia (B.L.Rob.) R.M.King & H.Rob. - Argentina
