= Semiria =

Scientific classification
- Kingdom: Plantae
- Clade: Tracheophytes
- Clade: Angiosperms
- Clade: Eudicots
- Clade: Asterids
- Order: Asterales
- Family: Asteraceae
- Subfamily: Asteroideae
- Tribe: Eupatorieae
- Genus: Semiria; D.J.N.Hind
- Species: S. viscosa

Binomial name
- Semiria viscosa D.J.N.Hind

Genus of plants

Semiria is a genus of plants in the tribe Eupatorieae within the family Asteraceae.

== Species ==
The only known species is Semiria viscosa, native to the State of Bahia in eastern Brazil.
