= Urbananthus =

Scientific classification
- Kingdom: Plantae
- Clade: Tracheophytes
- Clade: Angiosperms
- Clade: Eudicots
- Clade: Asterids
- Order: Asterales
- Family: Asteraceae
- Subfamily: Asteroideae
- Tribe: Eupatorieae
- Genus: Urbananthus; R.M.King & H.Rob.

Type species
- Eupatorium critoniforme Urb.

Genus of flowering plants

Urbananthus is a genus of Caribbean plants in the tribe Eupatorieae within the family Asteraceae.

The genus is named in honor of German botanist Ignatz Urban, 1848–1931.

Species

- Urbananthus critoniformis (Urb.) R.M.King & H.Rob. - Jamaica
- Urbananthus pluriseriatus (B.L.Rob.) R.M.King & H.Rob. - Cuba
