= Austrocritonia =

Scientific classification
- Kingdom: Plantae
- Clade: Embryophytes
- Clade: Tracheophytes
- Clade: Angiosperms
- Clade: Eudicots
- Clade: Asterids
- Order: Asterales
- Family: Asteraceae
- Subfamily: Asteroideae
- Tribe: Eupatorieae
- Genus: Austrocritonia; R.M.King & H.Rob.

Genus of flowering plants

Austrocritonia is a genus of flowering plants in the family Asteraceae.

Species

The entire genus is endemic to Brazil.

- Austrocritonia angulicaulis (Sch.Bip. ex Baker) R.M.King & H.Rob. - Bahia, Espírito Santo, Minas Gerais, Rio de Janeiro, São Paulo
- Austrocritonia rosea (Gardner) R.M.King & H.Rob. - Rio de Janeiro
- Austrocritonia taunayana (Glaz. ex B.L.Rob.) R.M.King & H.Rob. - Rio de Janeiro
- Austrocritonia velutina (Gardner) R.M.King & H.Rob. - Minas Gerais, Rio de Janeiro, São Paulo, Paraná
