= Amboroa =

Scientific classification
- Kingdom: Plantae
- Clade: Embryophytes
- Clade: Tracheophytes
- Clade: Spermatophytes
- Clade: Angiosperms
- Clade: Eudicots
- Clade: Asterids
- Order: Asterales
- Family: Asteraceae
- Subfamily: Asteroideae
- Tribe: Eupatorieae
- Genus: Amboroa; Cabrera

Genus of flowering plants

Amboroa is a genus of flowering plants in the family Asteraceae. It is endemic to the highlands of South America. Amboroa was first described as a genus in 1956.

== Species ==
There are only two known species in Amboroa:

- Amboroa geminata Cabrera - Province of Sará in Bolivia
- Amboroa wurdackii R.M.King & H.Rob. - Amazonas and Loreto Regions of Peru
