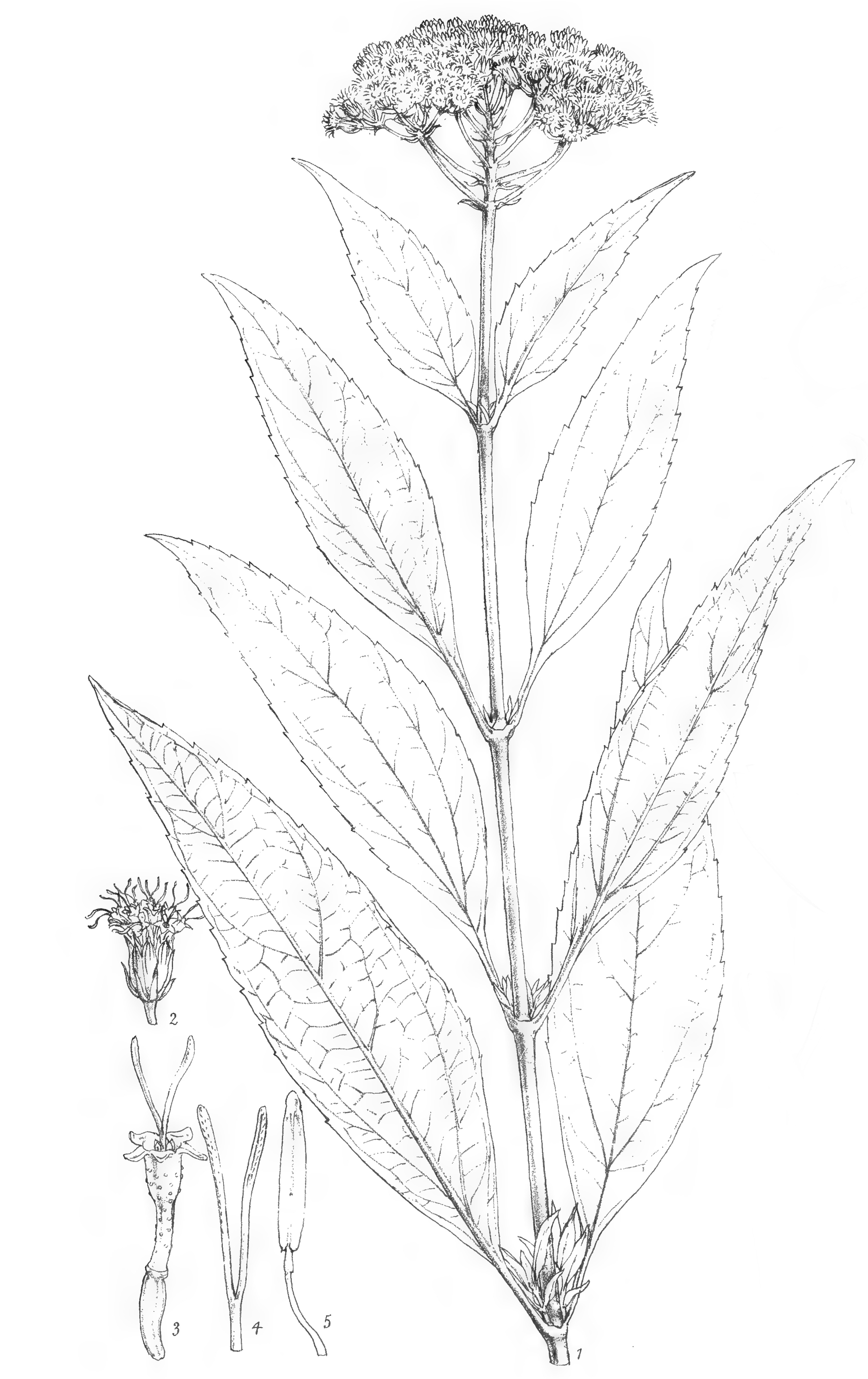
- Ageratella microphylla

Scientific classification
- Kingdom: Plantae
- Clade: Tracheophytes
- Clade: Angiosperms
- Clade: Eudicots
- Clade: Asterids
- Order: Asterales
- Family: Asteraceae
- Subfamily: Asteroideae
- Tribe: Eupatorieae
- Genus: Ageratella; S.Watson

= Ageratella =

Genus of flowering plants

Ageratella is a genus of flowering plants in the family Asteraceae.

Species include:

- Ageratella microphylla (Sch.Bip.) A.Gray ex S.Watson
- Ageratella palmeri (A.Gray) B.L.Rob.
