= Adenocritonia =

Scientific classification
- Kingdom: Plantae
- Clade: Tracheophytes
- Clade: Angiosperms
- Clade: Eudicots
- Clade: Asterids
- Order: Asterales
- Family: Asteraceae
- Subfamily: Asteroideae
- Tribe: Eupatorieae
- Genus: Adenocritonia; R.M.King & H.Rob.

Genus of flowering plants

Adenocritonia is a genus of flowering plants in the family Asteraceae described as a genus in 1976.

The genus is native to Mesoamerica and the West Indies.

Species

- Adenocritonia adamsii R.M.King & H.Rob. - Jamaica
- Adenocritonia heathiae (B.L.Turner) R.M.King & H.Rob. - Chiapas
- Adenocritonia steyermarkii H.Rob. - Guatemala
