= Sphaereupatorium =

Scientific classification
- Kingdom: Plantae
- Clade: Tracheophytes
- Clade: Angiosperms
- Clade: Eudicots
- Clade: Asterids
- Order: Asterales
- Family: Asteraceae
- Subfamily: Asteroideae
- Tribe: Eupatorieae
- Genus: Sphaereupatorium (O.Hoffm.) Kuntze ex B.L.Rob
- Species: S. scandens

Binomial name
- Sphaereupatorium scandens (Gardner) R.M.King & H.Rob.

Synonyms
- Eupatorium sect. Sphaereupatorium O.Hoffm.; Conoclinium scandens Gardner; Eupatorium hoffmannii Kuntze; Eupatorium poterioides Sch.Bip.; Sphaereupatorium hoffmannii (Kuntze) B.L.Rob.; Conoclinium scandens Gardner; Eupatorium sphaerocephalum Sch.Bip. ex Baker; Sphaereupatorium sphaerocephalum (Sch.Bip. ex Baker) R.M.King & H.Rob.; Eupatorium sphaerocephalum Sch.Bip.

Genus of plants

Sphaereupatorium is a genus of South American plants in the tribe Eupatorieae within the family Asteraceae.

Species

The only known species is Sphaereupatorium scandens, native to Bolivia and Brazil (Minas Gerais, D.F., Mato Grosso).
