= Lepidesmia =

Scientific classification
- Kingdom: Plantae
- Clade: Embryophytes
- Clade: Tracheophytes
- Clade: Angiosperms
- Clade: Eudicots
- Clade: Asterids
- Order: Asterales
- Family: Asteraceae
- Subfamily: Asteroideae
- Tribe: Eupatorieae
- Genus: Lepidesmia; Klatt

Genus of flowering plants

Lepidesmia is a genus of flowering plants in the family Asteraceae.

Species

- Lepidesmia squarrosa Klatt – Cuba, Venezuela
- Lepidesmia taraxacoides Källor
