= Ascidiogyne =

Scientific classification
- Kingdom: Plantae
- Clade: Embryophytes
- Clade: Tracheophytes
- Clade: Angiosperms
- Clade: Eudicots
- Clade: Asterids
- Order: Asterales
- Family: Asteraceae
- Subfamily: Asteroideae
- Tribe: Eupatorieae
- Genus: Ascidiogyne; Cuatrec.

Genus of flowering plants

Ascidiogyne is a genus of flowering plants in the family Asteraceae.

Species

Both species are endemic to northeastern Peru

- Ascidiogyne sanchezvegae Cabrera – Peru (Amazonas and Cajamarca regions)
- Ascidiogyne wurdackii Cuatrec. – Peru (Amazonas Region)
