= Gyptidium =

Scientific classification
- Kingdom: Plantae
- Clade: Embryophytes
- Clade: Tracheophytes
- Clade: Spermatophytes
- Clade: Angiosperms
- Clade: Eudicots
- Clade: Asterids
- Order: Asterales
- Family: Asteraceae
- Subfamily: Asteroideae
- Tribe: Eupatorieae
- Genus: Gyptidium; R.M.King & H.Rob.

Genus of flowering plants

Gyptidium is a genus of South American flowering plants in the family Asteraceae.

Species

- Gyptidium militare (B.L.Rob.) R.M.King & H.Rob. - Argentina (Formosa + Chaco Provinces)
- Gyptidium trichobasis (Baker) R.M.King & H.Rob. - Brazil (States of Paraná + Santa Catarina)
