= Phanerostylis =

Scientific classification
- Kingdom: Plantae
- Clade: Tracheophytes
- Clade: Angiosperms
- Clade: Eudicots
- Clade: Asterids
- Order: Asterales
- Family: Asteraceae
- Subfamily: Asteroideae
- Tribe: Eupatorieae
- Genus: Phanerostylis (A.Gray) R.M.King & H.Rob.

Synonyms
- Eupatorium subg. Phanerostylis A.Gray; Brickellia subg. Phanerostylis (A.Gray) B.L.Turner

Genus of flowering plants

Phanerostylis is a genus of Mexican plants in the tribe Eupatorieae within the family Asteraceae.

Species

- Phanerostylis coahuilensis (A.Gray) R.M.King & H.Rob. - Chihuahua, Coahuila, Tamaulipas, Nuevo León, San Luis Potosí, Zacatecas
- Phanerostylis glutinosa (Brandegee) R.M.King & H.Rob. - Oaxaca, Puebla
- Phanerostylis hintoniorum (B.L.Turner) R.M.King & H.Rob. - Coahuila, Nuevo León
- Phanerostylis nesomii (B.L.Turner) R.M.King & H.Rob. - Coahuila, Nuevo León, Tamaulipas
- Phanerostylis pedunculosa (DC.) R.M.King & H.Rob. - Guanajuato, Aguascalientes, Durango, Hidalgo, Jalisco, Michoacán, San Luis Potosí, Zacatecas
