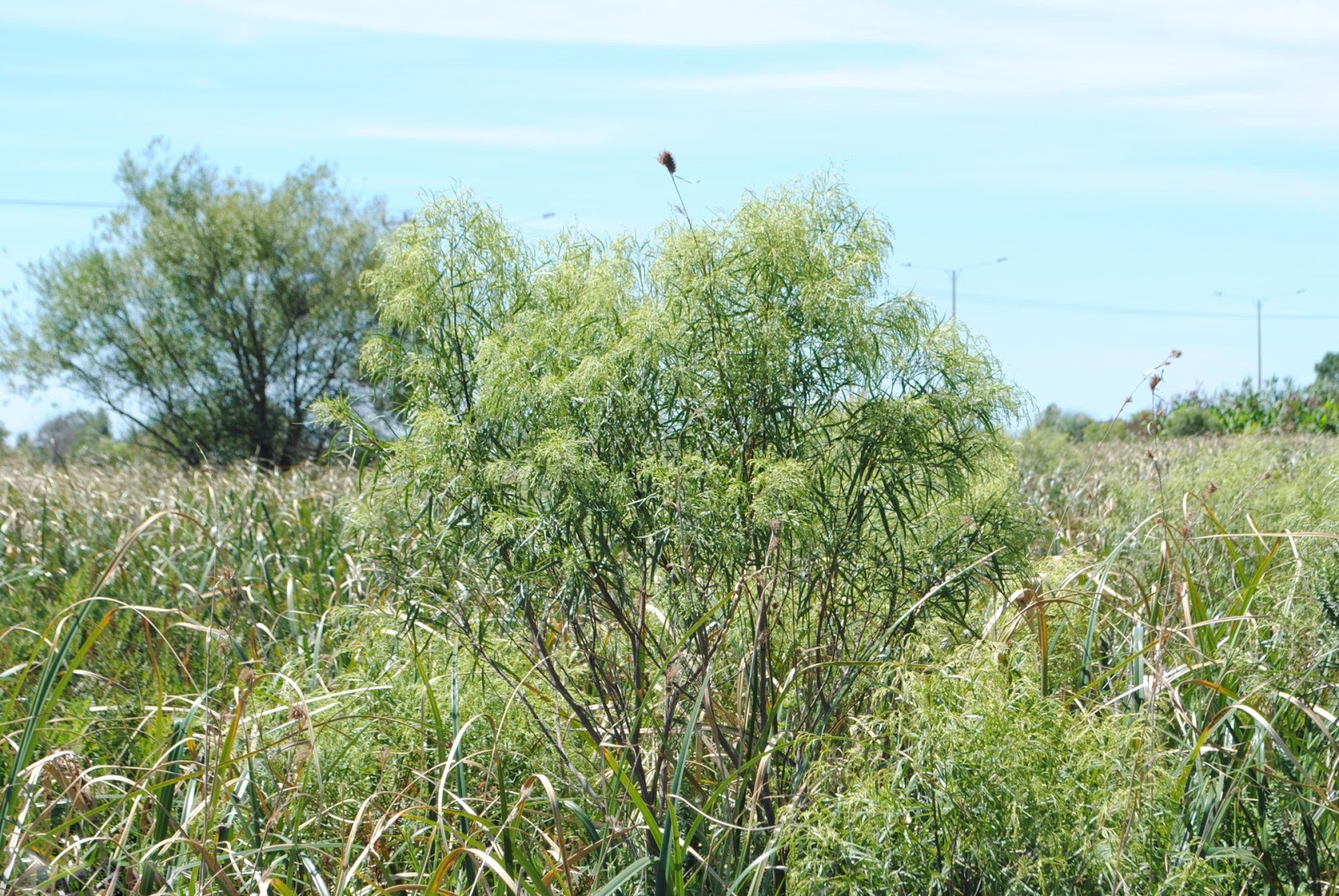
- Raulinoreitzia tremula

Scientific classification
- Kingdom: Plantae
- Clade: Tracheophytes
- Clade: Angiosperms
- Clade: Eudicots
- Clade: Asterids
- Order: Asterales
- Family: Asteraceae
- Subfamily: Asteroideae
- Tribe: Eupatorieae
- Genus: Raulinoreitzia; R.M.King & H.Rob.

Type species
- Baccharis crenulata Spreng.

Synonyms
- Eupatorium sect. Raulinoreitzia (R.M.King & H.Rob.) Cabrera

= Raulinoreitzia =

Genus of plants

Raulinoreitzia is a genus of South American plants in the tribe Eupatorieae within the family Asteraceae.

Species

- Raulinoreitzia crenulata (Spreng.) R.M.King & H.Rob. - Brazil, Bolivia, Argentina, Peru, Paraguay
- Raulinoreitzia leptophlebia (B.L.Rob.) R.M.King & H.Rob. - Rio Grande do Sul
- Raulinoreitzia tremula (Hook. & Arn.) R.M.King & H.Rob. - Brazil, Bolivia, Argentina
