= Centenaria rupacquiana =

Scientific classification
- Kingdom: Plantae
- Clade: Tracheophytes
- Clade: Angiosperms
- Clade: Eudicots
- Clade: Asterids
- Order: Asterales
- Family: Asteraceae
- Subfamily: Asteroideae
- Tribe: Eupatorieae
- Subtribe: Piqueriinae
- Genus: Centenaria; P.Gonzáles, A.Cano & H.Rob.
- Species: C. rupacquiana

Binomial name
- Centenaria rupacquiana P.Gonzáles, A.Cano & H.Rob.

Species of flowering plant

Centenaria rupacquiana is a species of flowering plant in the family Asteraceae. It is the sole species in genus Centenaria, and is endemic to Peru.
