= Gongrostylus =

Scientific classification
- Kingdom: Plantae
- Clade: Embryophytes
- Clade: Tracheophytes
- Clade: Spermatophytes
- Clade: Angiosperms
- Clade: Eudicots
- Clade: Asterids
- Order: Asterales
- Family: Asteraceae
- Subfamily: Asteroideae
- Tribe: Eupatorieae
- Genus: Gongrostylus; R.M.King & H.Rob.

Genus of flowering plants

Gongrostylus is a genus of flowering plants in the family Asteraceae.

Species

- Gongrostylus costaricensis (Kuntze) R.M.King & H.Rob. – Costa Rica, El Salvador, Panama, Colombia, Ecuador
- Gongrostylus pipolyi H.Rob. – Colombia (Chocó + Antioquia)
