= Nothobaccharis =

Scientific classification
- Kingdom: Plantae
- Clade: Tracheophytes
- Clade: Angiosperms
- Clade: Eudicots
- Clade: Asterids
- Order: Asterales
- Family: Asteraceae
- Subfamily: Asteroideae
- Tribe: Eupatorieae
- Genus: Nothobaccharis; R.M.King & H.Rob
- Species: N. candolleana

Binomial name
- Nothobaccharis candolleana (Steud.) R.M.King & H.Rob.

Synonyms
- Baccharis candolleana Steud.; Baccharis microphylla DC.; Eupatorium incarum B.L.Rob.; Brickellia microphylla (DC.) Hieron. 1908 not (Nutt.) A. Gray 1852

Species of plant

Nothobaccharis is a genus of Peruvian flowering plants in the tribe Eupatorieae within the family Asteraceae.

== Species ==
The only known species is Nothobaccharis candolleana, endemic to Peru.
