= Alomiella =

Scientific classification
- Kingdom: Plantae
- Clade: Tracheophytes
- Clade: Angiosperms
- Clade: Eudicots
- Clade: Asterids
- Order: Asterales
- Family: Asteraceae
- Subfamily: Asteroideae
- Tribe: Eupatorieae
- Genus: Alomiella; R.M.King & H.Rob.

Genus of flowering plants

Alomiella is a genus of flowering plants in the family Asteraceae, described as a genus in 1972.

The genus is endemic to the State of Mato Grosso in Brazil.

Species

- Alomiella hatschbachii R.M.King & H.Rob. - Mato Grosso
- Alomiella regnellii (Malme) R.M.King & H.Rob. - Mato Grosso
