= Tuberostylis =

Scientific classification
- Kingdom: Plantae
- Clade: Tracheophytes
- Clade: Angiosperms
- Clade: Eudicots
- Clade: Asterids
- Order: Asterales
- Family: Asteraceae
- Subfamily: Asteroideae
- Tribe: Eupatorieae
- Genus: Tuberostylis; Steetz in Seemann

Type species
- Tuberostylis rhizophorae Steetz in Seemann

Genus of flowering plants

Tuberostylis is a genus of Mesoamerican and South American plants in the tribe Eupatorieae within the family Asteraceae.

Species

- Tuberostylis axillaris S.F.Blake – Colombia
- Tuberostylis rhizophorae Steetz – Ecuador, Colombia, Panama
