= Gyptis =

Scientific classification
- Kingdom: Plantae
- Clade: Embryophytes
- Clade: Tracheophytes
- Clade: Spermatophytes
- Clade: Angiosperms
- Clade: Eudicots
- Clade: Asterids
- Order: Asterales
- Family: Asteraceae
- Subfamily: Asteroideae
- Tribe: Eupatorieae
- Genus: Gyptis (Cass.) Cass.

Type species
- Gyptis pinnatifida Cass. ex R.M.King & H.Rob.

Synonyms
- Eupatorium subg. Gyptis Cass.; Eupatorium sect. Gyptis (Cass.) Cabrera

Genus of flowering plants

Gyptis is a genus of South American flowering plants in the family Asteraceae.

Species

- Gyptis artemisiifolia (Griseb.) R.M.King & H.Rob.
- Gyptis commersonii Cass.
- Gyptis crassipes (Hieron.) R.M.King & H.Rob.
- Gyptis inornata R.M.King & H.Rob.
- Gyptis lanigera (Hook. & Arn.) R.M.King & H.Rob.
- Gyptis pinnatifida Cass. ex R.M.King & H.Rob.
- Gyptis vernoniopsis (Sch.Bip. ex Baker) R.M.King & H.Rob.
