= Monogereion =

Scientific classification
- Kingdom: Plantae
- Clade: Embryophytes
- Clade: Tracheophytes
- Clade: Angiosperms
- Clade: Eudicots
- Clade: Asterids
- Order: Asterales
- Family: Asteraceae
- Subfamily: Asteroideae
- Tribe: Eupatorieae
- Genus: Monogereion; G.M.Barroso & R.M.King
- Species: M. carajensis

Binomial name
- Monogereion carajensis G.M.Barroso & R.M.King

Genus of flowering plants

Monogereion is a genus of Brazilian flowering plants in the tribe Eupatorieae within the family Asteraceae.

Species

There is only one known species, Monogereion carajensis, native to the State of Pará in northeastern Brazil.
