= Arrojadocharis =

Scientific classification
- Kingdom: Plantae
- Clade: Embryophytes
- Clade: Tracheophytes
- Clade: Angiosperms
- Clade: Eudicots
- Clade: Asterids
- Order: Asterales
- Family: Asteraceae
- Subfamily: Asteroideae
- Tribe: Eupatorieae
- Genus: Arrojadocharis; Mattf.

Synonyms
- Arrojadoa Mattf. 1923, illegitimate homonym, not Britton & Rose 1920 (Cactaceae)

Genus of flowering plants

Arrojadocharis is a genus of flowering plants in the family Asteraceae.

Species

Both species are endemic to the State of Bahia in Brazil

- Arrojadocharis praxeloides (Mattf.) Mattf.
- Arrojadocharis santosii R.M.King & H.Rob.
