= Sartorina =

Scientific classification
- Kingdom: Plantae
- Clade: Tracheophytes
- Clade: Angiosperms
- Clade: Eudicots
- Clade: Asterids
- Order: Asterales
- Family: Asteraceae
- Subfamily: Asteroideae
- Tribe: Eupatorieae
- Genus: Sartorina; R.M.King & H.Rob.
- Species: S. schultzii

Binomial name
- Sartorina schultzii R.M.King & H.Rob.

Genus of plants

Sartorina is a genus of flowering plants in the tribe Eupatorieae within the family Asteraceae.

== Species ==
The only known species is Sartorina schultzii. The native range of the species is unknown. It was described from an old specimen at the Schultz-Bonpontius Museum in Paris, labeled only as having been collected in "tropical America."
