= Morithamnus =

Scientific classification
- Kingdom: Plantae
- Clade: Tracheophytes
- Clade: Angiosperms
- Clade: Eudicots
- Clade: Asterids
- Order: Asterales
- Family: Asteraceae
- Subfamily: Asteroideae
- Tribe: Eupatorieae
- Genus: Morithamnus; R.M.King, H.Rob. & G.M.Barroso

Genus of flowering plants

Morithamnus is a genus of Brazilian flowering plants in the tribe Eupatorieae within the family Asteraceae.

Species

- Morithamnus crassus R.M.King, H.Rob. & G.M.Barroso - State of Bahia in eastern Brazil
- Morithamnus ganophyllus (Mattf. ex Pilg.) R.M.King & H.Rob. - State of Bahia in eastern Brazil
