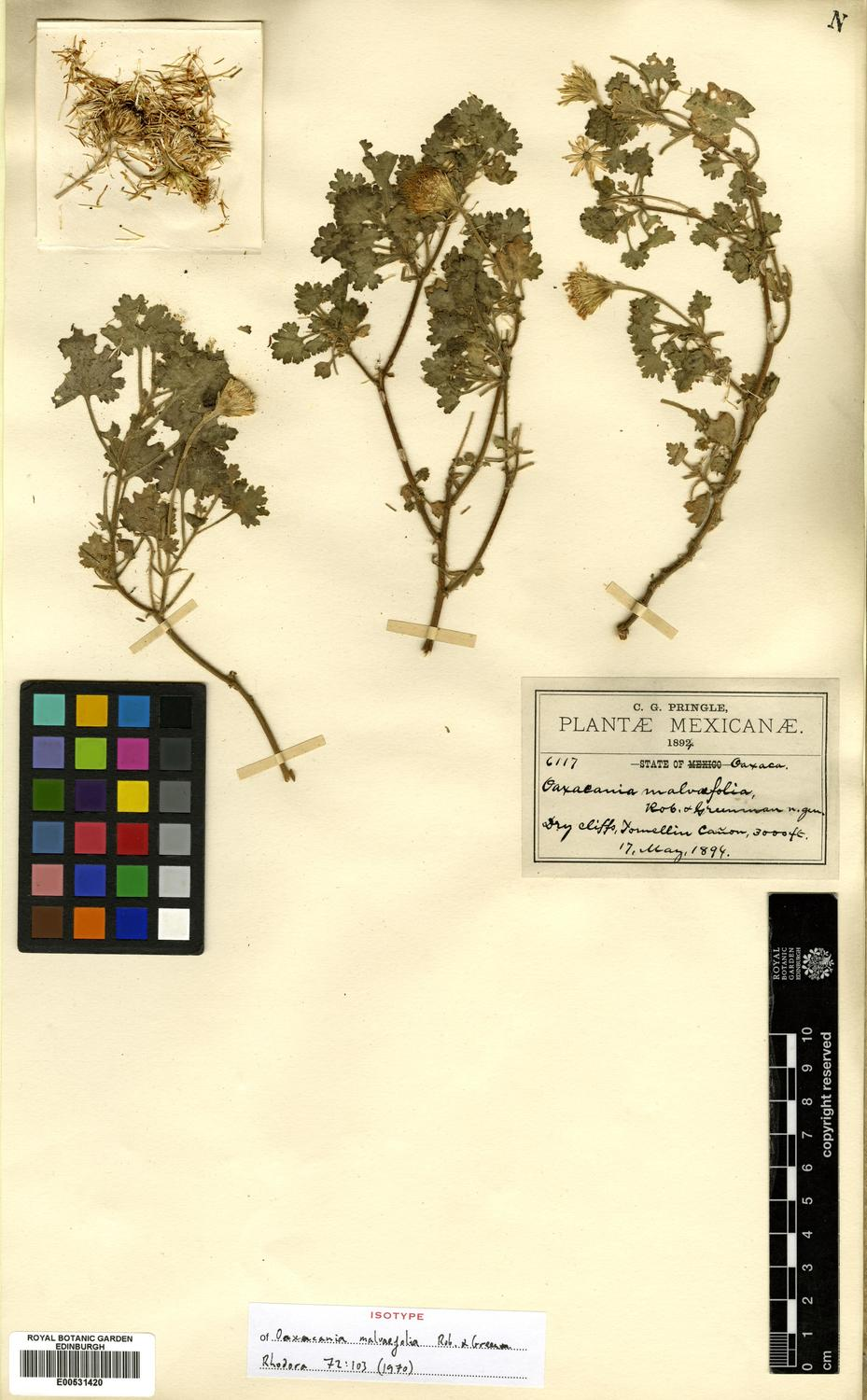

Scientific classification
- Kingdom: Plantae
- Clade: Tracheophytes
- Clade: Angiosperms
- Clade: Eudicots
- Clade: Asterids
- Order: Asterales
- Family: Asteraceae
- Subfamily: Asteroideae
- Tribe: Eupatorieae
- Genus: Oaxacania; B.L.Rob. & Greenm.
- Species: O. malvifolia

Binomial name
- Oaxacania malvifolia B.L.Rob. & Greenm.

Synonyms
- Oaxacania malvaefolia B.L.Rob. & Greenm., alternate spelling; Hofmeisteria malvaefolia (B.L.Rob. & Greenm.) B.L.Turner

= Oaxacania =

Genus of flowering plants

Oaxacania is a genus of flowering plants in the family Asteraceae.

Species

There is only one known species, Oaxacania malvifolia, native to the State of Oaxaca in southern Mexico.
