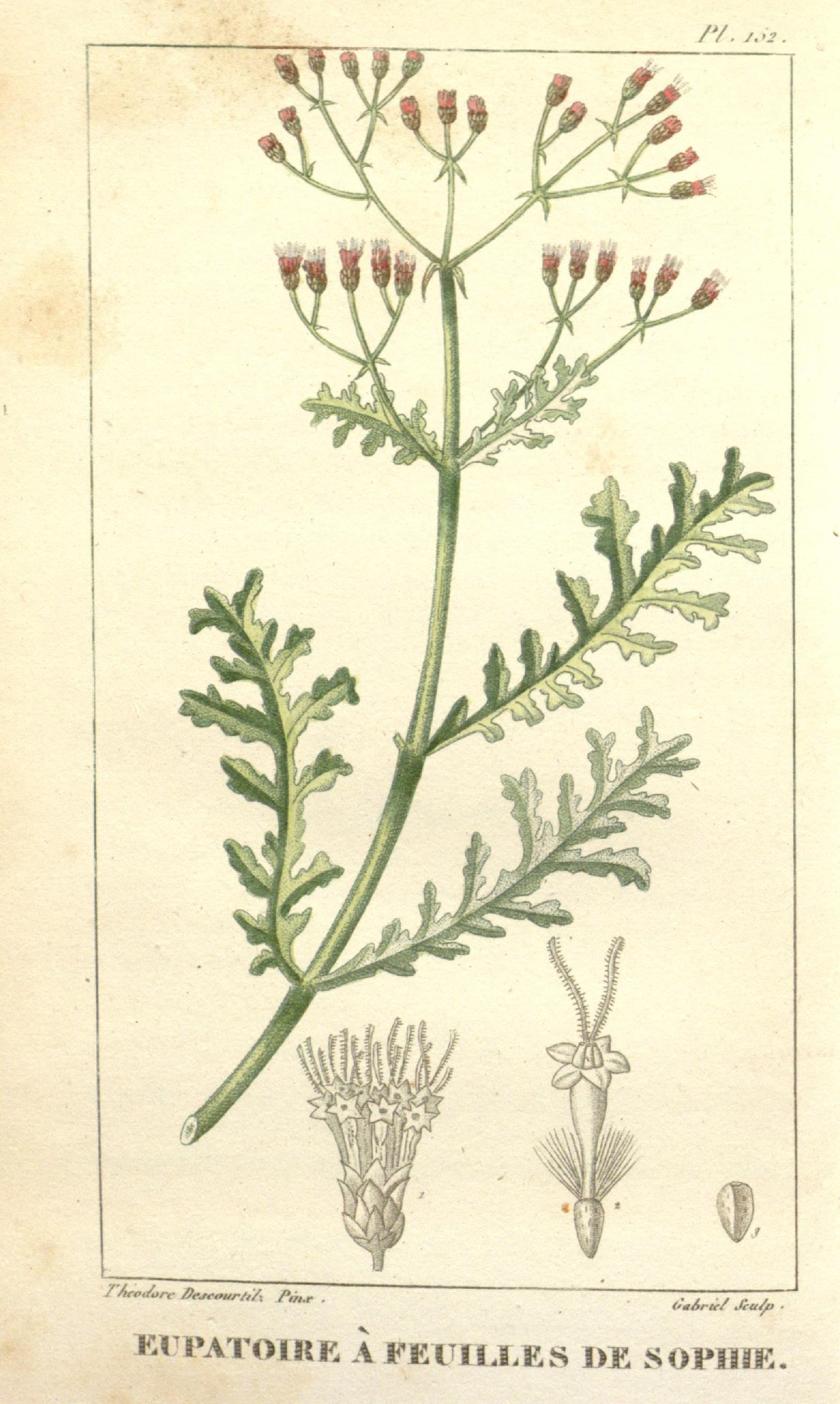

Scientific classification
- Kingdom: Plantae
- Clade: Tracheophytes
- Clade: Angiosperms
- Clade: Eudicots
- Clade: Asterids
- Order: Asterales
- Family: Asteraceae
- Subfamily: Asteroideae
- Tribe: Eupatorieae
- Genus: Eupatorina; R.M.King & H.Rob.
- Species: E. sophiifolia

Binomial name
- Eupatorina sophiifolia (L.) R.M.King & H.Rob.

Synonyms
- Eupatorium sophiifolium L.; Eupatorium sophiaefolium L., common misspelling; Eupatorina sophiaefolia (L.) R.M.King & H.Rob., common misspelling

= Eupatorina =

Genus of flowering plants

Eupatorina is a genus of flowering plants in the family Asteraceae.

There is only one known species, Eupatorina sophiifolia, endemic to the island of Hispaniola in the West Indies (Dominican Republic and Haiti).
