= Gymnocondylus =

Scientific classification
- Kingdom: Plantae
- Clade: Tracheophytes
- Clade: Angiosperms
- Clade: Eudicots
- Clade: Asterids
- Order: Asterales
- Family: Asteraceae
- Subfamily: Asteroideae
- Tribe: Eupatorieae
- Genus: Gymnocondylus; R.M.King & H.Rob
- Species: G. galeopsifolius

Binomial name
- Gymnocondylus galeopsifolius (Gardner) R.M.King & H.Rob.

Synonyms
- Eupatorium galeopsifolium Gardner; Eupatorium rupestre Gardner

Genus of flowering plants

Gymnocondylus is a genus of Brazilian flowering plants in the family Asteraceae.

There is only one known species, Gymnocondylus galeopsifolius, native to Brazil (Goiás and Distrito Federal).
