= Catolesia =

Scientific classification
- Kingdom: Plantae
- Clade: Tracheophytes
- Clade: Angiosperms
- Clade: Eudicots
- Clade: Asterids
- Order: Asterales
- Family: Asteraceae
- Subfamily: Asteroideae
- Tribe: Eupatorieae
- Genus: Catolesia; D.J.N.Hind

Genus of flowering plants

Catolesia is a genus of flowering plants in the family Asteraceae.

Species

Both known species are endemic to the State of Bahia in eastern Brazil.

- Catolesia huperzioides N.Roque, H.Rob. & A.A.Conc.
- Catolesia mentiens D.J.N.Hind
