= Decachaeta =

Scientific classification
- Kingdom: Plantae
- Clade: Embryophytes
- Clade: Tracheophytes
- Clade: Angiosperms
- Clade: Eudicots
- Clade: Asterids
- Order: Asterales
- Family: Asteraceae
- Subfamily: Asteroideae
- Tribe: Eupatorieae
- Genus: Decachaeta; DC.

Genus of flowering plants

Decachaeta is a genus of Mesoamerican flowering plants in the family Asteraceae.

Species

- Decachaeta haenkeana DC. - Chihuahua, Sonora, Sinaloa, Colima, Guerrero, Michoacán, Nayarit, Oaxaca, Jalisco
- Decachaeta incompta (DC.) R.M.King & H.Rob. - Chiapas, Oaxaca, Colima, Guerrero, Michoacán, México State, Jalisco, Puebla
- Decachaeta ovandensis (Grashoff & Beaman) R.M.King & H.Rob. - Chiapas
- Decachaeta ovatifolia (DC.) R.M.King & H.Rob. - Guerrero, Michoacán, México State, Jalisco, Nayarit
- Decachaeta perornata (Klatt) R.M.King & H.Rob. - Chiapas, Oaxaca, Michoacán, México State, Jalisco, Puebla, Veracruz, Hidalgo
- Decachaeta scabrella (B.L.Rob.) R.M.King & H.Rob. - Chihuahua, Sinaloa, Colima, Michoacán, Nayarit, Jalisco, Durango, Sonora, Guerrero
- Decachaeta thieleana (Klatt ex Klatt) R.M.King & H.Rob. - Costa Rica, Panama, Honduras
