= Condylidium =

Scientific classification
- Kingdom: Plantae
- Clade: Embryophytes
- Clade: Tracheophytes
- Clade: Angiosperms
- Clade: Eudicots
- Clade: Asterids
- Order: Asterales
- Family: Asteraceae
- Subfamily: Asteroideae
- Tribe: Eupatorieae
- Genus: Condylidium; R.M.King & H.Rob

Genus of flowering plants

Condylidium is a genus of flowering plants in the family Asteraceae.

Species

- Condylidium cuatrecasasii R.M.King & H.Rob. - Colombia
- Condylidium iresinoides (Kunth) R.M.King & H.Rob. - Central America, West Indies, South America, Florida
