= Corethamnium =

Scientific classification
- Kingdom: Plantae
- Clade: Tracheophytes
- Clade: Angiosperms
- Clade: Eudicots
- Clade: Asterids
- Order: Asterales
- Family: Asteraceae
- Subfamily: Asteroideae
- Tribe: Eupatorieae
- Genus: Corethamnium; R.M.King & H.Rob
- Species: C. chocoensis

Binomial name
- Corethamnium chocoensis R.M.King & H.Rob

Genus of flowering plants

Corethamnium is a genus of flowering plants in the family Asteraceae.

There is only one known species, Corethamnium chocoensis, endemic to the Chocó region of northwestern Colombia.
