= Neocabreria =

Scientific classification
- Kingdom: Plantae
- Clade: Tracheophytes
- Clade: Angiosperms
- Clade: Eudicots
- Clade: Asterids
- Order: Asterales
- Family: Asteraceae
- Subfamily: Asteroideae
- Tribe: Eupatorieae
- Genus: Neocabreria; R.M.King & H.Rob.

Type species
- Eupatorium serrulatum DC.

Synonyms
- Eupatorium sect. Gyptis (Cass.) Cabrera; Eupatorium sect. Heterocondylus (R.M.King & H.Rob.) Cabrera

Genus of flowering plants

Neocabreria is a genus of Brazilian flowering plants in the tribe Eupatorieae within the family Asteraceae.

The genus is named in honor of Argentine botanist Angel L. Cabrera.

Species

- Neocabreria catharinensis (Cabrera) R.M.King & H.Rob. - Santa Catarina
- Neocabreria malachophylla (Klatt) R.M.King & H.Rob. - Paraná, Santa Catarina, Rio Grande do Sul, São Paulo
- Neocabreria pennivenia (B.L.Rob.) R.M.King & H.Rob. - Paraná, Minas Gerais
- Neocabreria serrulata (DC.) R.M.King & H.Rob. - Paraná, Santa Catarina, Rio Grande do Sul, Minas Gerais

formerly included

Neocabreria concinna (DC.) R.M.King & H.Rob. - Eupatorium concinnum DC.
