= Vittetia =

Scientific classification
- Kingdom: Plantae
- Clade: Embryophytes
- Clade: Tracheophytes
- Clade: Angiosperms
- Clade: Eudicots
- Clade: Asterids
- Order: Asterales
- Family: Asteraceae
- Subfamily: Asteroideae
- Tribe: Eupatorieae
- Genus: Vittetia; R.M.King & H.Rob

Type species
- Eupatorium orbiculatum DC.

Genus of flowering plants

Vittetia is a genus of Brazilian plants in the tribe Eupatorieae within the family Asteraceae.

Species

- Vittetia bishopii R.M.King & H.Rob. - Minas Gerais
- Vittetia orbiculata (DC.) R.M.King & H.Rob. - Paraná, Santa Catarina, São Paulo
