= Bishopiella =

Scientific classification
- Kingdom: Plantae
- Clade: Embryophytes
- Clade: Tracheophytes
- Clade: Angiosperms
- Clade: Eudicots
- Clade: Asterids
- Order: Asterales
- Family: Asteraceae
- Subfamily: Asteroideae
- Tribe: Eupatorieae
- Genus: Bishopiella; R.M.King & H.Rob.
- Species: B. elegans

Binomial name
- Bishopiella elegans R.M.King & H.Rob.

Genus of flowering plants

Bishopiella is a genus of flowering plants in the family Asteraceae.

There is only one known species, Bishopiella elegans, native to the State of Bahia in eastern Brazil.
