= Austrobrickellia =

Scientific classification
- Kingdom: Plantae
- Clade: Embryophytes
- Clade: Tracheophytes
- Clade: Spermatophytes
- Clade: Angiosperms
- Clade: Eudicots
- Clade: Asterids
- Order: Asterales
- Family: Asteraceae
- Subfamily: Asteroideae
- Tribe: Eupatorieae
- Genus: Austrobrickellia; R.M.King & H.Rob.

Genus of plants

Austrobrickellia is a genus of flowering plants in the family Asteraceae.

Species

Austrobrickellia is native to southern South America.

- Austrobrickellia arnottii (Baker) R.M.King & H.Rob. – Paraguay, northern Argentina
- Austrobrickellia bakerianum (B.L.Rob.) R.M.King & H.Rob. – Rio Grande do Sul
- Austrobrickellia patens (Hook. & Arn.) R.M.King & H.Rob. – Argentina, Bolivia, Paraguay, Rio Grande do Sul
