= Planaltoa =

Scientific classification
- Kingdom: Plantae
- Clade: Tracheophytes
- Clade: Angiosperms
- Clade: Eudicots
- Clade: Asterids
- Order: Asterales
- Family: Asteraceae
- Subfamily: Asteroideae
- Tribe: Eupatorieae
- Genus: Planaltoa; Taub.

Type species
- Planaltoa salviifolia Taub.

Genus of plants

Planaltoa is a genus of flowering plants in the tribe Eupatorieae within the family Asteraceae.

The generic name Planaltoa refers to the Planalto Central (Brazilian Highlands) in southern, central, and eastern Brazil.

Species

- Planaltoa lychnophoroides G.M.Barroso - Goiás
- Planaltoa salviifolia Taub. - Goiás
