= Cavalcantia =

Scientific classification
- Kingdom: Plantae
- Clade: Tracheophytes
- Clade: Angiosperms
- Clade: Eudicots
- Clade: Asterids
- Order: Asterales
- Family: Asteraceae
- Subfamily: Asteroideae
- Tribe: Eupatorieae
- Genus: Cavalcantia; R.M.King & H.Rob

Genus of flowering plants

Cavalcantia is a genus of flowering plants in the family Asteraceae, endemic to the State of Pará in Brazil.

Species

- Cavalcantia glomerata (G.M.Barroso & R.M.King) R.M.King & H.Rob. - Pará
- Cavalcantia percymosa R.M.King & H.Rob. - Pará
