= Critoniadelphus =

Scientific classification
- Kingdom: Plantae
- Clade: Tracheophytes
- Clade: Angiosperms
- Clade: Eudicots
- Clade: Asterids
- Order: Asterales
- Family: Asteraceae
- Subfamily: Asteroideae
- Tribe: Eupatorieae
- Genus: Critoniadelphus; R.M.King & H.Rob.

Genus of flowering plants

Critoniadelphus is a genus of flowering plants in the family Asteraceae.

Species

- Critoniadelphus microdon (B.L.Rob.) R.M.King & H.Rob. - Guatemala, Mexico (Chiapas)
- Critoniadelphus nubigenus (Benth.) R.M.King & H.Rob. - Guatemala, Honduras, El Salvador, Mexico (Chiapas)
