= Idiothamnus =

Scientific classification
- Kingdom: Plantae
- Clade: Embryophytes
- Clade: Tracheophytes
- Clade: Angiosperms
- Clade: Eudicots
- Clade: Asterids
- Order: Asterales
- Family: Asteraceae
- Subfamily: Asteroideae
- Tribe: Eupatorieae
- Genus: Idiothamnus; R.M. King & H. Rob

Type species
- Eupatoriastrum clavisetus V.M.Badillo

Genus of flowering plants

Idiothamnus is a genus of South American flowering plants in the family Asteraceae.

Species

- Idiothamnus clavisetus (V.M.Badillo) R.M.King & H.Rob. - Venezuela
- Idiothamnus lilloi (B.L.Rob.) R.M.King & H.Rob. - Argentina (Salta + Tucumán)
- Idiothamnus orgyaloides (B.L.Rob.) R.M.King & H.Rob. - Peru
- Idiothamnus pseudorgyalis R.M.King & H.Rob. - Distrito Federal do Brasil, Rio de Janeiro
