= Dissothrix =

Scientific classification
- Kingdom: Plantae
- Clade: Tracheophytes
- Clade: Angiosperms
- Clade: Eudicots
- Clade: Asterids
- Order: Asterales
- Family: Asteraceae
- Subfamily: Asteroideae
- Tribe: Eupatorieae
- Genus: Dissothrix; A.Gray
- Species: D. imbricata

Binomial name
- Dissothrix imbricata (Gardner) B.L.Rob.

Synonyms
- Stevia imbricata Gardner; Dissothrix gardneri A.Gray

Genus of flowering plants

Dissothrix is a genus of flowering plants in the family Asteraceae.

There is only one known species, Dissothrix imbricata, endemic to the state of Ceará in Brazil.
