= Grisebachianthus =

Scientific classification
- Kingdom: Plantae
- Clade: Tracheophytes
- Clade: Angiosperms
- Clade: Eudicots
- Clade: Asterids
- Order: Asterales
- Family: Asteraceae
- Subfamily: Asteroideae
- Tribe: Eupatorieae
- Genus: Grisebachianthus; R.M.King & H.Rob

Type species
- Grisebachianthus plucheoides (Griseb.) R.M.King & H.Rob.

Genus of flowering plants

Grisebachianthus is a genus of Cuban flowering plants in the family Asteraceae.

The genus is named in honor of German botanist August Heinrich Rudolf Grisebach, 1814–1879.

Species

All species are endemic to Cuba.

- Grisebachianthus carsticola (Borhidi & O.Muñiz) R.M.King & H.Rob.
- Grisebachianthus holquinensis (B.L.Rob.) R.M.King & H.Rob.
- Grisebachianthus hypoleucus (Griseb.) R.M.King & H.Rob.
- Grisebachianthus lantanifolius (Griseb.) R.M.King & H.Rob.
- Grisebachianthus libanotica (Sch.Bip.) R.M.King & H.Rob.
- Grisebachianthus mayarensis (Alain) R.M.King & H.Rob.
- Grisebachianthus nipensis (B.L.Rob.) R.M.King & H.Rob.
- Grisebachianthus plucheoides (Griseb.) R.M.King & H.Rob.
