= Diacranthera =

Scientific classification
- Kingdom: Plantae
- Clade: Embryophytes
- Clade: Tracheophytes
- Clade: Angiosperms
- Clade: Eudicots
- Clade: Asterids
- Order: Asterales
- Family: Asteraceae
- Subfamily: Asteroideae
- Tribe: Eupatorieae
- Genus: Diacranthera; R.M.King & H.Rob.

Genus of flowering plants

Diacranthera is a genus of flowering plants in the family Asteraceae.

Species

All the known species are endemic to Brazil.

- Diacranthera crenata (Schltdl. ex Mart.) R.M.King & H.Rob. - Pernambuco, Bahia
- Diacranthera hebeclinia H.Rob. - Bahia
- Diacranthera ulei R.M.King & H.Rob. - Bahia, Ceará
