= Spaniopappus =

Scientific classification
- Kingdom: Plantae
- Clade: Tracheophytes
- Clade: Angiosperms
- Clade: Eudicots
- Clade: Asterids
- Order: Asterales
- Family: Asteraceae
- Subfamily: Asteroideae
- Tribe: Eupatorieae
- Genus: Spaniopappus; B.L.Rob.

Type species
- Spaniopappus ekmanii B.L.Rob.

Genus of plants

Spaniopappus is a genus of Cuban plants in the tribe Eupatorieae within the family Asteraceae.

Species

- Spaniopappus buchii (B.L.Rob.) R.M.King & H.Rob.
- Spaniopappus ekmanii B.L.Rob.
- Spaniopappus hygrophilus (Alain) R.M.King & H.Rob.
- Spaniopappus iodostylus (B.L.Rob.) R.M.King & H.Rob.
- Spaniopappus ruckeri (B.L.Rob.) R.M.King & H.Rob.
- Spaniopappus shaferi (B.L.Rob.) R.M.King & H.Rob.
