= Heterocondylus =

Scientific classification
- Kingdom: Plantae
- Clade: Embryophytes
- Clade: Tracheophytes
- Clade: Angiosperms
- Clade: Eudicots
- Clade: Asterids
- Order: Asterales
- Family: Asteraceae
- Subfamily: Asteroideae
- Tribe: Eupatorieae
- Genus: Heterocondylus; R.M.King & H.Rob.

Type species
- Eupatorium vitalbae DC.

Synonyms
- Eupatorium sect. Heterocondylus R.M.King & H.Rob.

Genus of flowering plants

Heterocondylus is a genus of Latin American flowering plants in the family Asteraceae.

Species

- Heterocondylus alatus (Vell.) R.M.King & H.Rob. - Brazil
- Heterocondylus amphidyctius (DC.) R.M.King & H.Rob. - Brazil
- Heterocondylus caracaensis H.Rob. - Brazil
- Heterocondylus decipiens (Baker) R.M.King & H.Rob. - Brazil
- Heterocondylus grandis (Sch.Bip. ex Baker) R.M.King & H.Rob. - Brazil
- Heterocondylus itacolumiensis (Sch.Bip. ex Baker) R.M.King & H.Rob. - Brazil
- Heterocondylus jaraguensis (B.L.Rob.) R.M.King & H.Rob. - Brazil
- Heterocondylus leptolepis (Baker) R.M.King & H.Rob. - Brazil
- Heterocondylus lysimachioides (Chodat) R.M.King & H.Rob. - Paraguay
- Heterocondylus pandurifolius (Baker) R.M.King & H.Rob. - Brazil
- Heterocondylus pumilus (Gardner) R.M.King & H.Rob. - Brazil
- Heterocondylus reitzii R.M.King & H.Rob. - Brazil
- Heterocondylus vitalbae (DC.) R.M.King & H.Rob. - widespread from Costa Rica to Paraguay
