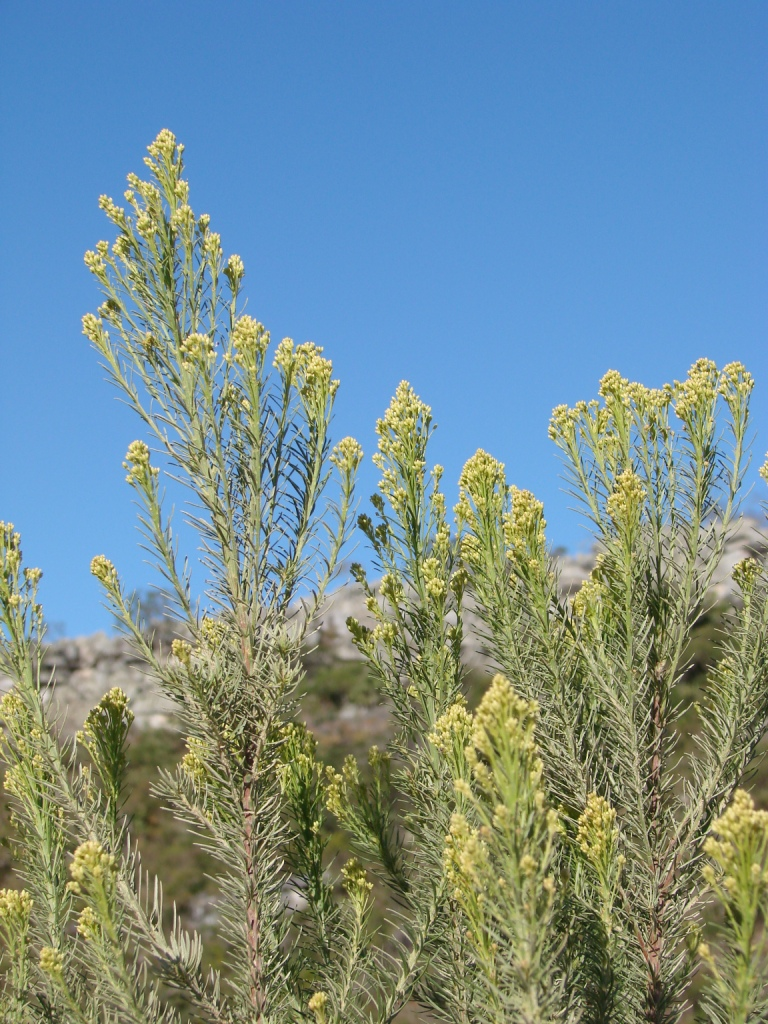
- Pseudobrickellia brasiliensis

Scientific classification
- Kingdom: Plantae
- Clade: Tracheophytes
- Clade: Angiosperms
- Clade: Eudicots
- Clade: Asterids
- Order: Asterales
- Family: Asteraceae
- Subfamily: Asteroideae
- Tribe: Eupatorieae
- Genus: Pseudobrickellia; R.M.King & H.Rob.

Type species
- Eupatorium brasiliense Spreng.

= Pseudobrickellia =

Genus of plants

Pseudobrickellia is a genus of Brazilian plants in the tribe Eupatorieae within the family Asteraceae.

Species

- Pseudobrickellia angustissima (Spreng. ex Baker) R.M.King & H.Rob. - Bahia, Piauí, Minas Gerais, D.F., Goiás
- Pseudobrickellia brasiliensis (Spreng.) R.M.King & H.Rob. - Amazonas, Rondônia, Tocantins, Bahia, Ceará, Piauí, Minas Gerais, D.F., São Paulo, Goiás, Mato Grosso, Mato Grosso do Sul
- Pseudobrickellia irwinii R.M.King & H.Rob. - Minas Gerais, D.F.
