= Polyanthina =

- Polyanthina nemorosa in Ecuador

Scientific classification
- Kingdom: Plantae
- Clade: Tracheophytes
- Clade: Angiosperms
- Clade: Eudicots
- Clade: Asterids
- Order: Asterales
- Family: Asteraceae
- Subfamily: Asteroideae
- Tribe: Eupatorieae
- Genus: Polyanthina; R.M.King & H.Rob
- Species: P. nemorosa

Binomial name
- Polyanthina nemorosa (Klatt) R.M.King & H.Rob

Synonyms
- Baccharis sect. Eupatoriola O.Hoffm. & Kuntze; Eupatorium rusbyi Britton; Eupatorium melarhabdotrichum Gilli; Baccharis oppositifolia Kuntze; Eupatorium pteropodum Hieron.; Eupatorium nemorosum Klatt

Genus of flowering plants

Polyanthina is a genus of flowering plants in the tribe Eupatorieae within the family Asteraceae.

== Species ==
The only known species is Polyanthina nemorosa, native to South and Central America (Panama, Costa Rica, Venezuela, Colombia, Ecuador, and Peru).
