= Piptothrix =

Scientific classification
- Kingdom: Plantae
- Clade: Tracheophytes
- Clade: Angiosperms
- Clade: Eudicots
- Clade: Asterids
- Order: Asterales
- Family: Asteraceae
- Subfamily: Asteroideae
- Tribe: Eupatorieae
- Genus: Piptothrix; A.Gray

Type species
- Piptothrix palmeri A.Gray

Genus of flowering plants

Piptothrix is a genus of Mesoamerican plants in the tribe Eupatorieae within the family Asteraceae.

Species

- Piptothrix areolaris (DC.) R.M.King & H.Rob. - from Chihuahua to El Salvador
- Piptothrix jaliscensis B.L.Rob. - Jalisco
- Piptothrix palmeri A.Gray - Chihuahua
- Piptothrix pubens A.Gray - Jalisco
- Piptothrix sinaloae S.F.Blake - Sinaloa

formerly included

see Ageratina Jaliscoa

- Piptothrix aegiroides B.L.Rob. & Greenm. - Jaliscoa goldmanii (B.L.Rob.) R.M.King & H.Rob.
- Piptothrix arizonica A.Nelson - Ageratina paupercula (A.Gray) R.M.King & H.Rob.
- Piptothrix goldmanii B.L.Rob. - Jaliscoa goldmanii (B.L.Rob.) R.M.King & H.Rob.
- Piptothrix paleacea Cronquist - Jaliscoa paleacea (Cronquist) R.M.King & H.Rob.
