= Condylopodium =

Scientific classification
- Kingdom: Plantae
- Clade: Embryophytes
- Clade: Tracheophytes
- Clade: Spermatophytes
- Clade: Angiosperms
- Clade: Eudicots
- Clade: Asterids
- Order: Asterales
- Family: Asteraceae
- Subfamily: Asteroideae
- Tribe: Eupatorieae
- Genus: Condylopodium; R.M.King & H.Rob.

Genus of flowering plants

Condylopodium is a genus of flowering plants in the family Asteraceae.

Species

- Condylopodium cuatrecasasii R.M.King & H.Rob. - Colombia
- Condylopodium fuliginosum (Kunth) R.M.King & H.Rob. - Colombia, Ecuador
- Condylopodium gachalanum S.Díaz & G.P.Méndez - Colombia
- Condylopodium hyalinifolium S.Díaz & G.P.Méndez - Colombia
- Condylopodium killipii R.M.King & H.Rob. - Colombia
- Condylopodium pennellii R.M.King & H.Rob. - Colombia
