= Antillia brachychaeta =

Scientific classification
- Kingdom: Plantae
- Clade: Embryophytes
- Clade: Tracheophytes
- Clade: Angiosperms
- Clade: Eudicots
- Clade: Asterids
- Order: Asterales
- Family: Asteraceae
- Subfamily: Asteroideae
- Tribe: Eupatorieae
- Genus: Antillia; R.M.King & H.Rob.
- Species: A. brachychaeta

Binomial name
- Antillia brachychaeta (B.L.Rob.) R.M.King & H.Rob

Synonyms
- Eupatorium brachychaetum B.L.Rob.; Eupatorium brachychaetum var. extentum B.L.Rob.

Species of flowering plant

Antillia is a genus of flowering plants in the family Asteraceae.

There is only one known species, Antillia brachychaeta, native to Cuba.
