= Paneroa =

Scientific classification
- Kingdom: Plantae
- Clade: Tracheophytes
- Clade: Angiosperms
- Clade: Eudicots
- Clade: Asterids
- Order: Asterales
- Family: Asteraceae
- Subfamily: Asteroideae
- Tribe: Eupatorieae
- Genus: Paneroa; E.E.Schill.
- Species: P. stachyofolia

Binomial name
- Paneroa stachyofolia (B.L.Rob.) E.E.Schill.

Synonyms
- Ageratum stachyofolium B.L.Rob.

Genus of flowering plants

Paneroa is a genus of flowering plants in the family Asteraceae. It includes a single species, Paneroa stachyofolia, which is endemic to the state of Oaxaca in southern Mexico.

The species was first described as Ageratum stachyofolium by Benjamin Lincoln Robinson in 1901. In 2008 Edward E. Schilling placed it in the new monotypic genus Paneroa as Paneroa stachyofolia.
