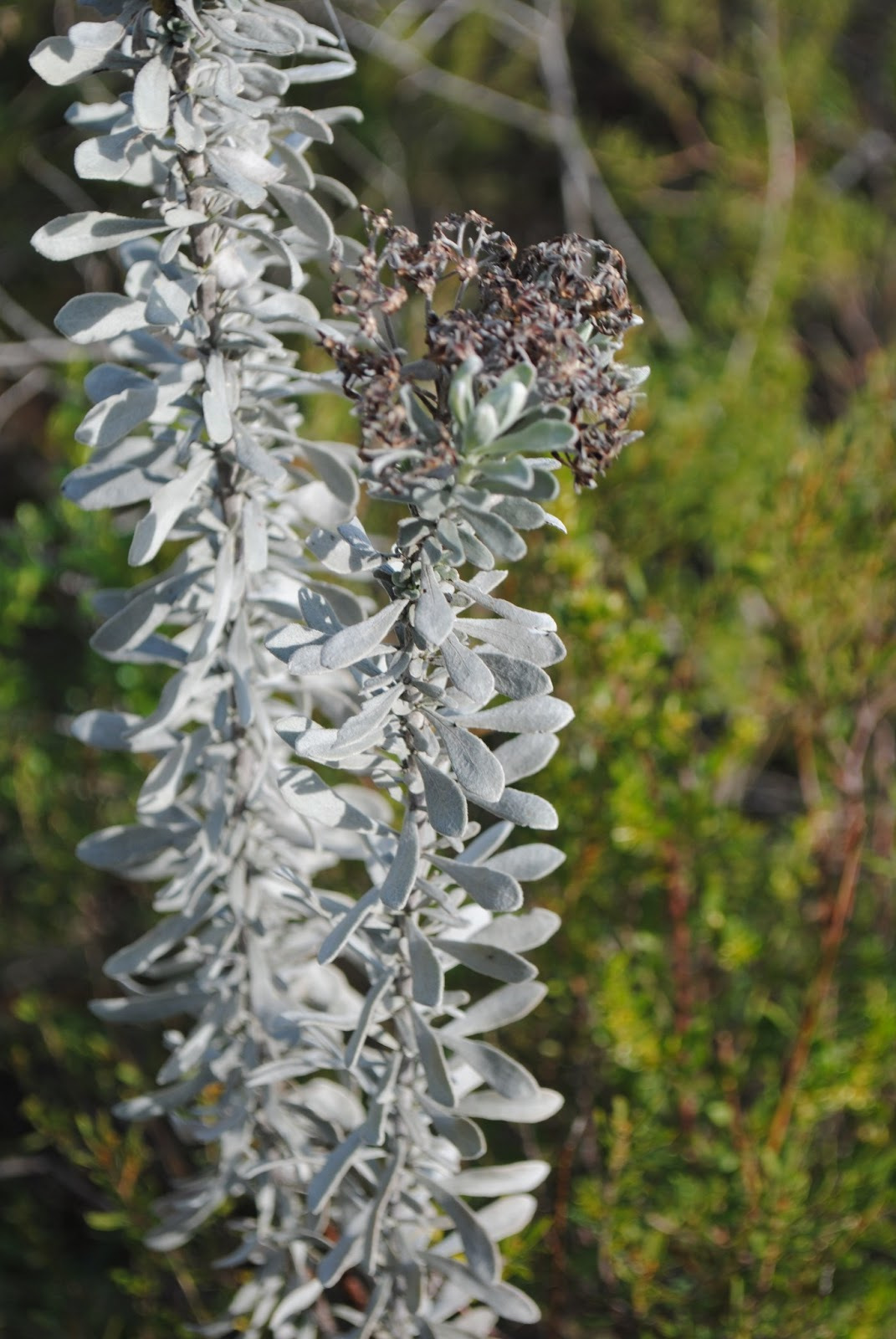
- Disynaphia spathulata

Scientific classification
- Kingdom: Plantae
- Clade: Embryophytes
- Clade: Tracheophytes
- Clade: Angiosperms
- Clade: Eudicots
- Clade: Asterids
- Order: Asterales
- Family: Asteraceae
- Subfamily: Asteroideae
- Tribe: Eupatorieae
- Genus: Disynaphia; Hook. & Arn. ex DC.

Synonyms
- Eupatorium sect. Disynaphia (Hook. & Arn. ex DC.) Cabrera

= Disynaphia =

Genus of flowering plants

Disynaphia is a genus of South American flowering plants in the family Asteraceae.

Species

- Disynaphia achillaea (Chodat) R.M.King & H.Rob.
- Disynaphia albissima (Hassl.) R.M.King & H.Rob.
- Disynaphia calyculata (Hook. & Arn.) R.M.King & H.Rob.
- Disynaphia ericoides (DC.) R.M.King & H.Rob.
- Disynaphia filifolia (Hassl.) R.M.King & H.Rob.
- Disynaphia halimifolia (DC.) R.M.King & H.Rob.
- Disynaphia ligulaefolia (Hook. & Arn.) R.M.King & H.Rob.
- Disynaphia littoralis (Cabrera) R.M.King & H.Rob.
- Disynaphia minutiflora R.M.King & H.Rob.
- Disynaphia multicrenulata (Sch.Bip. ex Baker) R.M.King & H.Rob.
- Disynaphia praeficta (B.L.Rob.) R.M.King & H.Rob.
- Disynaphia radula (Chodat) R.M.King & H.Rob.
- Disynaphia senecionidea (Baker) R.M.King & H.Rob.
- Disynaphia spathulata (Hook. & Arn.) R.M.King & H.Rob.
- Disynaphia tacuarembensis (Hieron. & Arechav.) R.M.King & H.Rob.
- Disynaphia variolata (B.L.Rob.) R.M.King & H.Rob.
