= Ferreyrella =

Scientific classification
- Kingdom: Plantae
- Clade: Embryophytes
- Clade: Tracheophytes
- Clade: Angiosperms
- Clade: Eudicots
- Clade: Asterids
- Order: Asterales
- Family: Asteraceae
- Subfamily: Asteroideae
- Tribe: Eupatorieae
- Genus: Ferreyrella; S.F.Blake

Genus of flowering plants

Ferreyrella is a genus of Peruvian flowering plants in the family Asteraceae.

Species

- Ferreyrella cuatrecasasii R.M.King & H.Rob.
- Ferreyrella peruviana S.F.Blake
