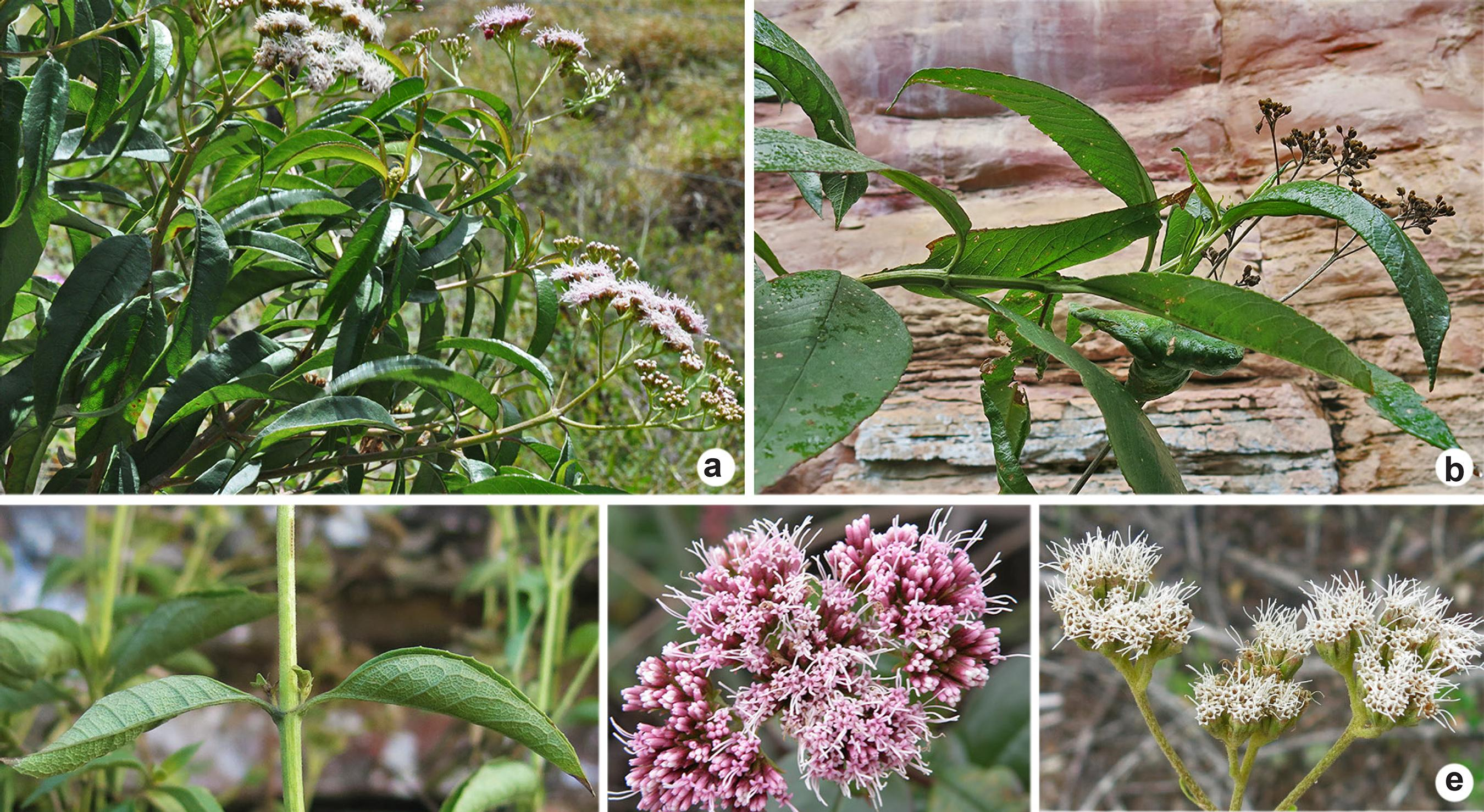
- Acritopappus species from Brazil

Scientific classification
- Kingdom: Plantae
- Clade: Tracheophytes
- Clade: Angiosperms
- Clade: Eudicots
- Clade: Asterids
- Order: Asterales
- Family: Asteraceae
- Subfamily: Asteroideae
- Tribe: Eupatorieae
- Genus: Acritopappus; R.M.King & H.Rob.

= Acritopappus =

Genus of flowering plants

Acritopappus is a genus of flowering plants in the family Asteraceae described as a genus in 1972.

The entire genus is endemic to Brazil.

== Taxonomy ==
=== Species ===
As of July 2020, Plants of the World online has 19 accepted species:

- Acritopappus buiquensis D.J.N.Hind & Bautista
- Acritopappus catolesensis D.J.N.Hind & Bautista
- Acritopappus confertus (Gardner) R.M.King & H.Rob.
- Acritopappus connatifolius (Soar.Nunes) R.M.King & H.Rob.
- Acritopappus diamantinicus Bautista, S.Ortiz & Rodr.Oubiña
- Acritopappus harleyi R.M.King & H.Rob.
- Acritopappus heterolepis (Baker) R.M.King & H.Rob.
- Acritopappus irwinii R.M.King & H.Rob.
- Acritopappus jacobaeus Bautista, Rodr.Oubiña & S.Ortiz
- Acritopappus longifolius (Gardner) R.M.King & H.Rob.
- Acritopappus micropappus (Baker) R.M.King & H.Rob.
- Acritopappus morii R.M.King & H.Rob.
- Acritopappus pereirae Bautista, S.Ortiz & Rodr.Oubiña
- Acritopappus pintoi Bautista & D.J.N.Hind
- Acritopappus prunifolius R.M.King & H.Rob.
- Acritopappus santosii R.M.King & H.Rob.
- Acritopappus stenophyllus Bautista, Rodr.Oubiña & S.Ortiz
- Acritopappus subtomentosus R.M.King & H.Rob.
- Acritopappus teixeirae R.M.King & H.Rob.

Selected synonyms include:

- Acritopappus hagei R.M.King & H.Rob. — synonym of Acritopappus heterolepis
