= Leptoclinium =

Scientific classification
- Kingdom: Plantae
- Clade: Tracheophytes
- Clade: Angiosperms
- Clade: Eudicots
- Clade: Asterids
- Order: Asterales
- Family: Asteraceae
- Subfamily: Asteroideae
- Tribe: Eupatorieae
- Genus: Leptoclinium (Nutt.) Benth. & Hook.f.
- Species: L. trichotomum

Binomial name
- Leptoclinium trichotomum (Gardner) Benth.

Synonyms
- Liatris subg. Leptoclinium Nutt.; Liatris trichotoma Gardner

Genus of flowering plants

Leptoclinium is a genus of flowering plants in the family Asteraceae.

Species

There is only one known species, Leptoclinium trichotomum, native to the State of Goiás in Brazil.
