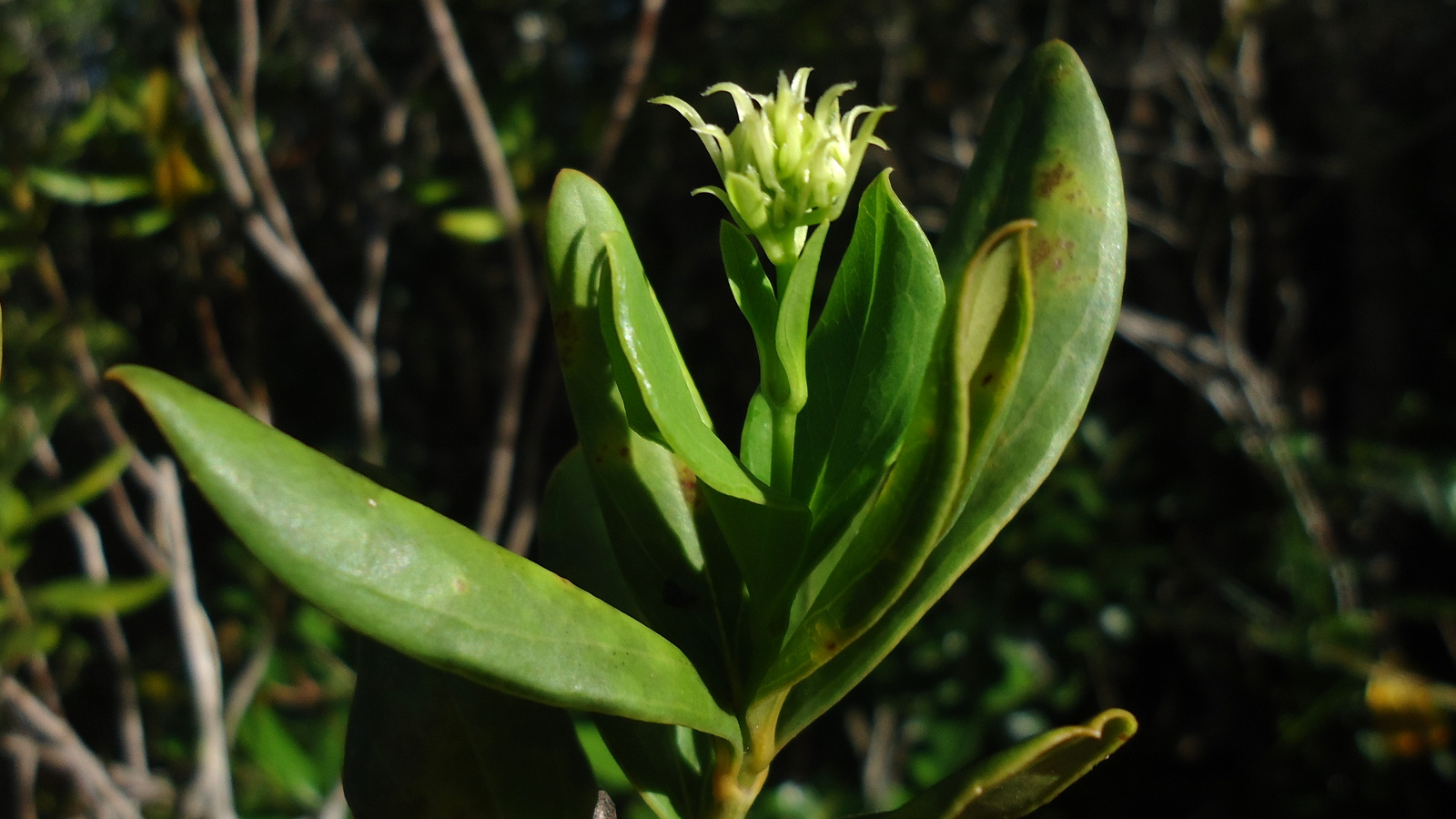
- Litothamnus nitidus

Scientific classification
- Kingdom: Plantae
- Clade: Tracheophytes
- Clade: Angiosperms
- Clade: Eudicots
- Clade: Asterids
- Order: Asterales
- Family: Asteraceae
- Subfamily: Asteroideae
- Tribe: Eupatorieae
- Genus: Litothamnus; R.M.King & H.Rob.

Type species
- Litothamnus ellipticus R.M.King & H.Rob.

= Litothamnus =

Genus of flowering plants

Litothamnus is a genus of Brazilian flowering plants in the tribe Eupatorieae within the family Asteraceae.

Species

- Litothamnus ellipticus R.M.King & H.Rob. - Bahia
- Litothamnus nitidus (DC.) W.C.Holmes - Bahia
