= Prolobus =

Scientific classification
- Kingdom: Plantae
- Clade: Tracheophytes
- Clade: Angiosperms
- Clade: Eudicots
- Clade: Asterids
- Order: Asterales
- Family: Asteraceae
- Subfamily: Asteroideae
- Tribe: Eupatorieae
- Genus: Prolobus; R.M.King & H.Rob.
- Species: P. nitidulus

Binomial name
- Prolobus nitidulus (Baker) R.M.King & H.Rob.

Synonyms
- Eupatorium nitidulum Baker (type species); Eupatorium moritibense B.L.Rob.; Gochnatia suffrutescens Cabrera

Genus of plants

Prolobus is a genus of flowering plants in the tribe Eupatorieae within the family Asteraceae.

Species

The only known species is Prolobus nitidulus, native to the State of Bahia in eastern Brazil.
