= Trichogoniopsis =

Scientific classification
- Kingdom: Plantae
- Clade: Tracheophytes
- Clade: Angiosperms
- Clade: Eudicots
- Clade: Asterids
- Order: Asterales
- Family: Asteraceae
- Subfamily: Asteroideae
- Tribe: Eupatorieae
- Genus: Trichogoniopsis; R.M.King & H.Rob

Type species
- Eupatorium adenanthum DC.

Genus of plants

Trichogoniopsis is a genus of Brazilian plants in the tribe Eupatorieae within the family Asteraceae.

Species

- Trichogoniopsis adenantha (DC.) R.M.King & H.Rob. - Brazil (Minas Gerais, São Paulo, Bahia, Mato Grosso, Ceará, Paraná, Rio de Janeiro, Espírito Santo)
- Trichogoniopsis grazielae Soar.Nunes - Brazil (Pernambuco)
- Trichogoniopsis morii R.M.King & H.Rob. - Brazil (Bahia)
- Trichogoniopsis podocarpa (DC.) R.M.King & H.Rob. - Brazil (Rio de Janeiro)
