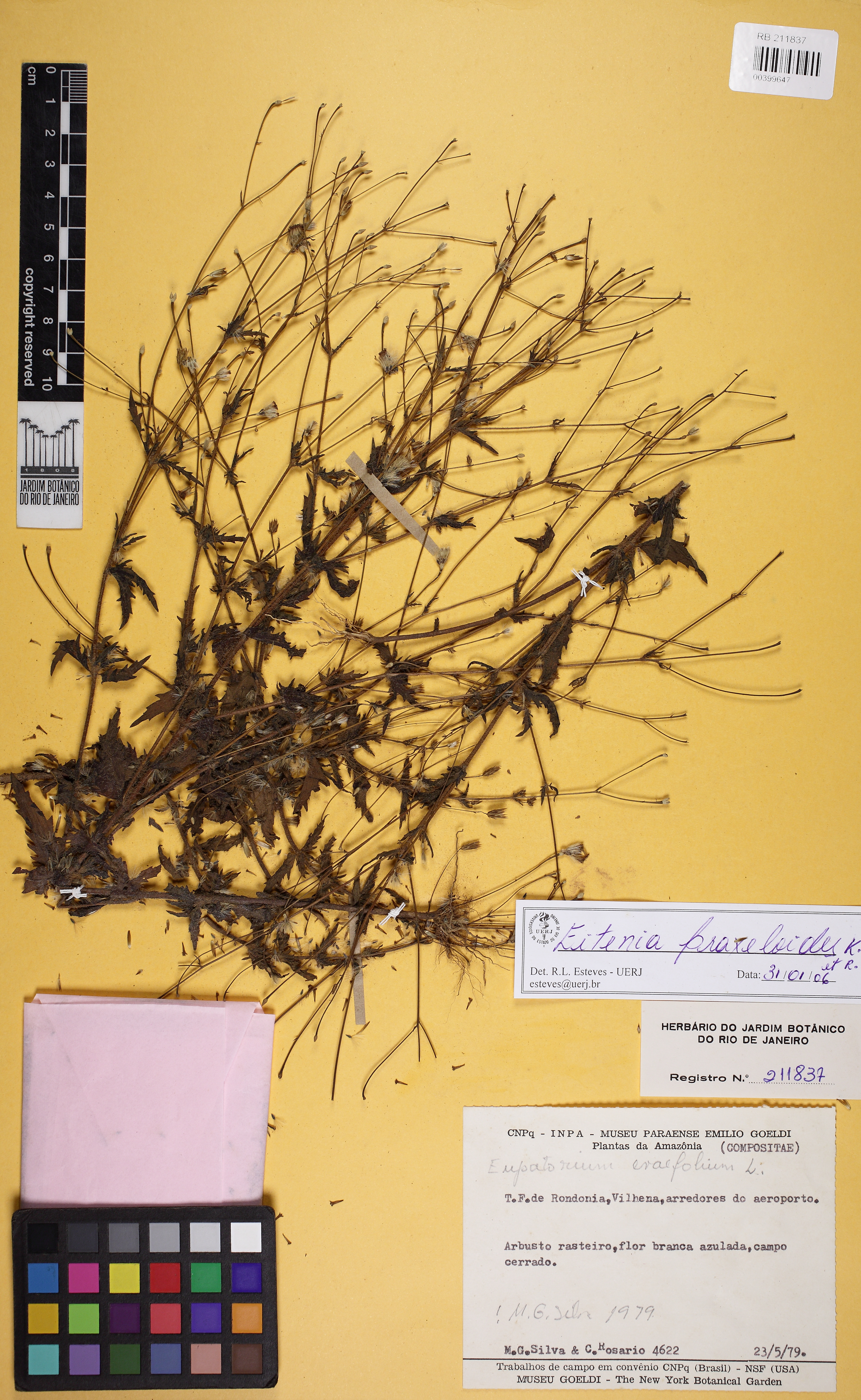

Scientific classification
- Kingdom: Plantae
- Clade: Embryophytes
- Clade: Tracheophytes
- Clade: Angiosperms
- Clade: Eudicots
- Clade: Asterids
- Order: Asterales
- Family: Asteraceae
- Subfamily: Asteroideae
- Tribe: Eupatorieae
- Genus: Eitenia; R.M.King & H.Rob.

= Eitenia =

Genus of flowering plants

Eitenia is a genus of Brazilian flowering plants in the family Asteraceae.

Species

- Eitenia polyseta R.M.King & H.Rob. - Brazil (Goiás, Distrito Federal)
- Eitenia praxeloides R.M.King & H.Rob. - Brazil (Goiás)
