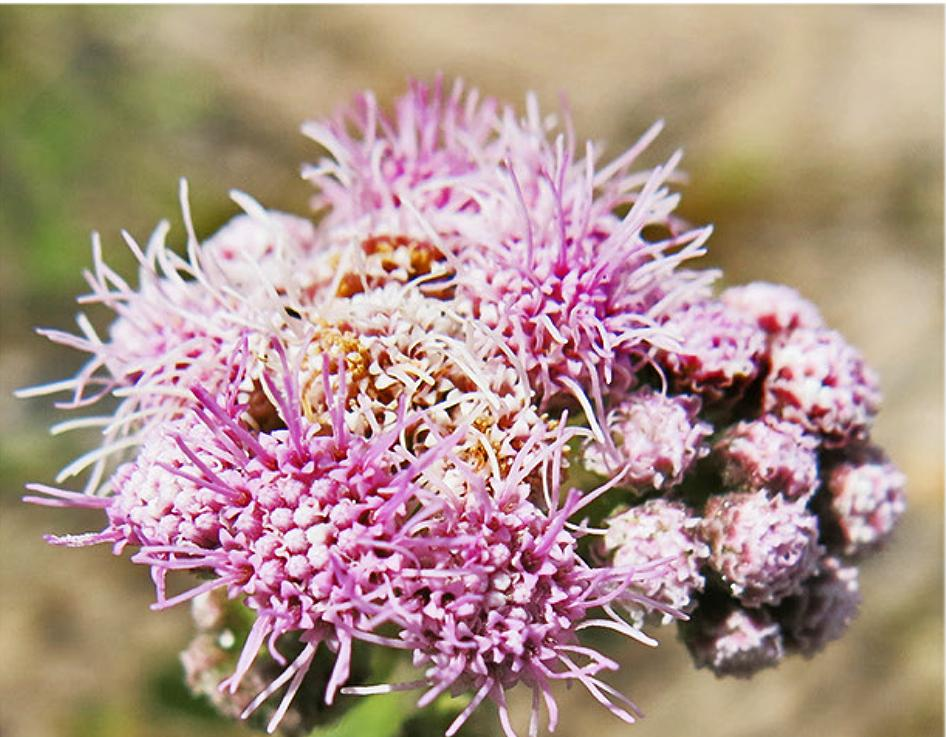

Scientific classification
- Kingdom: Plantae
- Clade: Tracheophytes
- Clade: Angiosperms
- Clade: Eudicots
- Clade: Asterids
- Order: Asterales
- Family: Asteraceae
- Subfamily: Asteroideae
- Tribe: Eupatorieae
- Genus: Scherya; R.M.King & H.Rob
- Species: S. bahiensis

Binomial name
- Scherya bahiensis R.M.King & H.Rob

= Scherya =

Genus of plants

Scherya is a genus of flowering plants in the family Asteraceae. The only known species is Scherya bahiensis, native to the State of Bahia in eastern Brazil.
