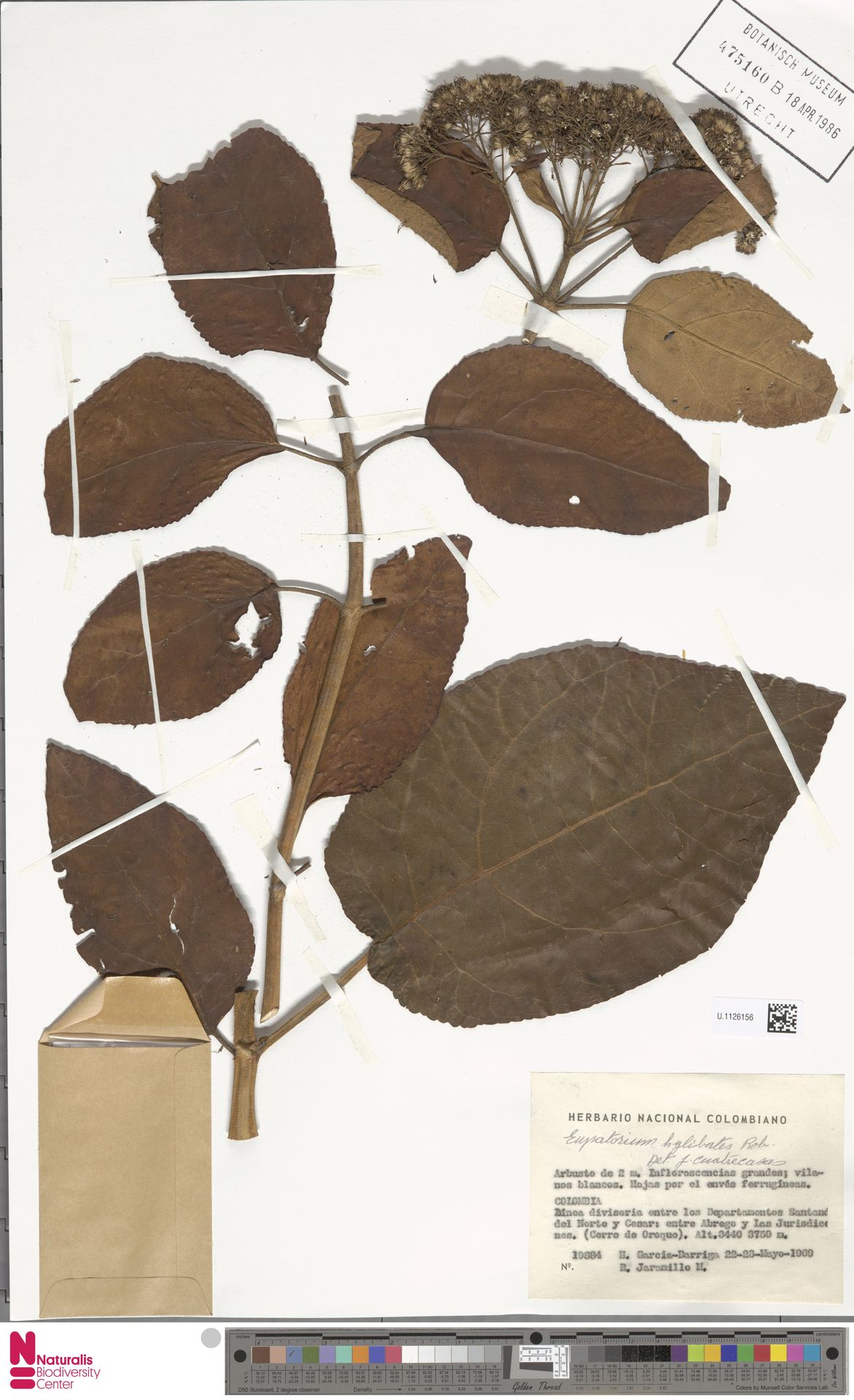

Scientific classification
- Kingdom: Plantae
- Clade: Embryophytes
- Clade: Tracheophytes
- Clade: Angiosperms
- Clade: Eudicots
- Clade: Asterids
- Order: Asterales
- Family: Asteraceae
- Subfamily: Asteroideae
- Tribe: Eupatorieae
- Genus: Jaramilloa; R.M.King & H.Rob.

Type species
- Eupatorium hylibates B.L.Robins.

= Jaramilloa =

Genus of flowering plants

Jaramilloa is a genus of flowering plants in the family Asteraceae.

Species

Both species are reported only from northern Colombia.

- Jaramilloa hylibates (B.L.Rob.) R.M.King & H.Rob.
- Jaramilloa sanctae-martae R.M.King & H.Rob.
