= Metastevia =

Scientific classification
- Kingdom: Plantae
- Clade: Tracheophytes
- Clade: Angiosperms
- Clade: Eudicots
- Clade: Asterids
- Order: Asterales
- Family: Asteraceae
- Subfamily: Asteroideae
- Tribe: Eupatorieae
- Genus: Metastevia; Grashoff
- Species: M. hintonii

Binomial name
- Metastevia hintonii Grashoff

Synonyms
- Stevia hintonii (Grashoff) B.L.Turner

Genus of flowering plants

Metastevia is a genus of flowering plants in the tribe Eupatorieae within the family Asteraceae.

== Species ==
There is only one known species, Metastevia hintonii, native to central Mexico (Guerrero and México State).
