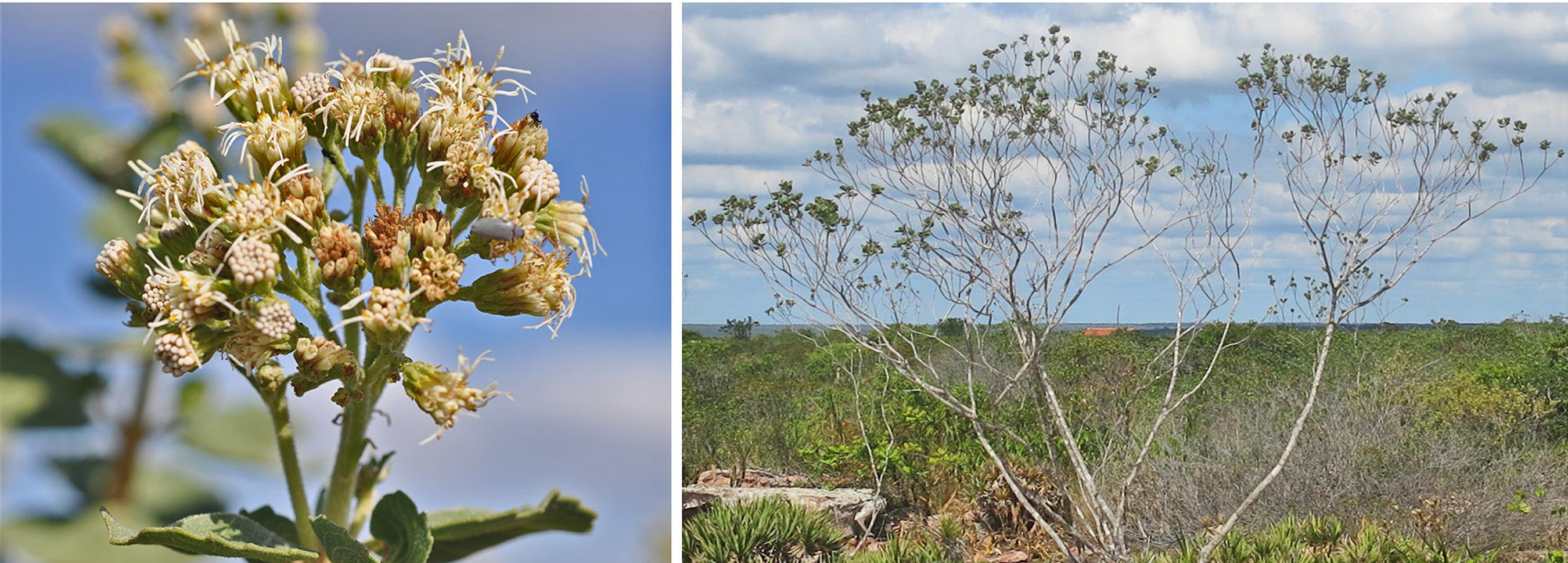

Scientific classification
- Kingdom: Plantae
- Clade: Tracheophytes
- Clade: Angiosperms
- Clade: Eudicots
- Clade: Asterids
- Order: Asterales
- Family: Asteraceae
- Subfamily: Asteroideae
- Tribe: Eupatorieae
- Genus: Lapidia; Roque & S.C.Ferreira
- Species: L. apicifolia

Binomial name
- Lapidia apicifolia Roque & S.C.Ferreira

= Lapidia =

Genus of plants

Lapidia is a monotypic genus of flowering plants belonging to the family Asteraceae. The only species is Lapidia apicifolia.

The species is found in Northeastern Brazil, Chapada Diamantina, Bahia.
