= Chacoa =

Scientific classification
- Kingdom: Plantae
- Clade: Embryophytes
- Clade: Tracheophytes
- Clade: Angiosperms
- Clade: Eudicots
- Clade: Asterids
- Order: Asterales
- Family: Asteraceae
- Subfamily: Asteroideae
- Tribe: Eupatorieae
- Genus: Chacoa; R.M.King & H.Rob.
- Species: C. pseudoprasiifolia

Binomial name
- Chacoa pseudoprasiifolia (Hassl.) R.M.King & H.Rob.

Synonyms
- Eupatorium sect. Laevia Cabrera; Eupatorium pseudoprasiifolium Hassl.; Eupatorium fiebrigii var. heterophyllum Hassl.; Eupatorium fiebrigii var. acuminata Hassl.; Eupatorium fiebrigii Hassl.

Genus of flowering plants

Chacoa is a genus of flowering plants in the family Asteraceae.

There is only one known species, Chacoa pseudoprasiifolia, native to southern Brazil (Santa Catarina State), Paraguay, and northeastern Argentina.

formerly included

Chacoa mikaniifolia (B.L.Rob.) R.M.King & H.Rob. - Synonym of Bishovia mikaniifolia (B.L.Rob.) R.M.King & H.Rob.
