= Campovassouria =

Scientific classification
- Kingdom: Plantae
- Clade: Embryophytes
- Clade: Tracheophytes
- Clade: Spermatophytes
- Clade: Angiosperms
- Clade: Eudicots
- Clade: Asterids
- Order: Asterales
- Family: Asteraceae
- Subfamily: Asteroideae
- Tribe: Eupatorieae
- Genus: Campovassouria; R.M.King & H.Rob.

Synonyms
- Eupatorium sect. Campovassouria (R.M.King & H.Rob.) Cabrera

Genus of flowering plants

Campovassouria is a genus of flowering plants in the family Asteraceae.

Species

Both known species are native to South America.

- Campovassouria barbosae H.Rob. - Brazil (Paraná)
- Campovassouria cruciata (Vell.) R.M.King & H.Rob. - Bolivia, Paraguay, Uruguay, northeastern Argentina, Brazil (Bahia, Mato Grosso do Sul, São Paulo, Rio de Janeiro, Minas Gerais, Espírito Santo, Santa Catarina, Rio Grande do Sul, Paraná)
