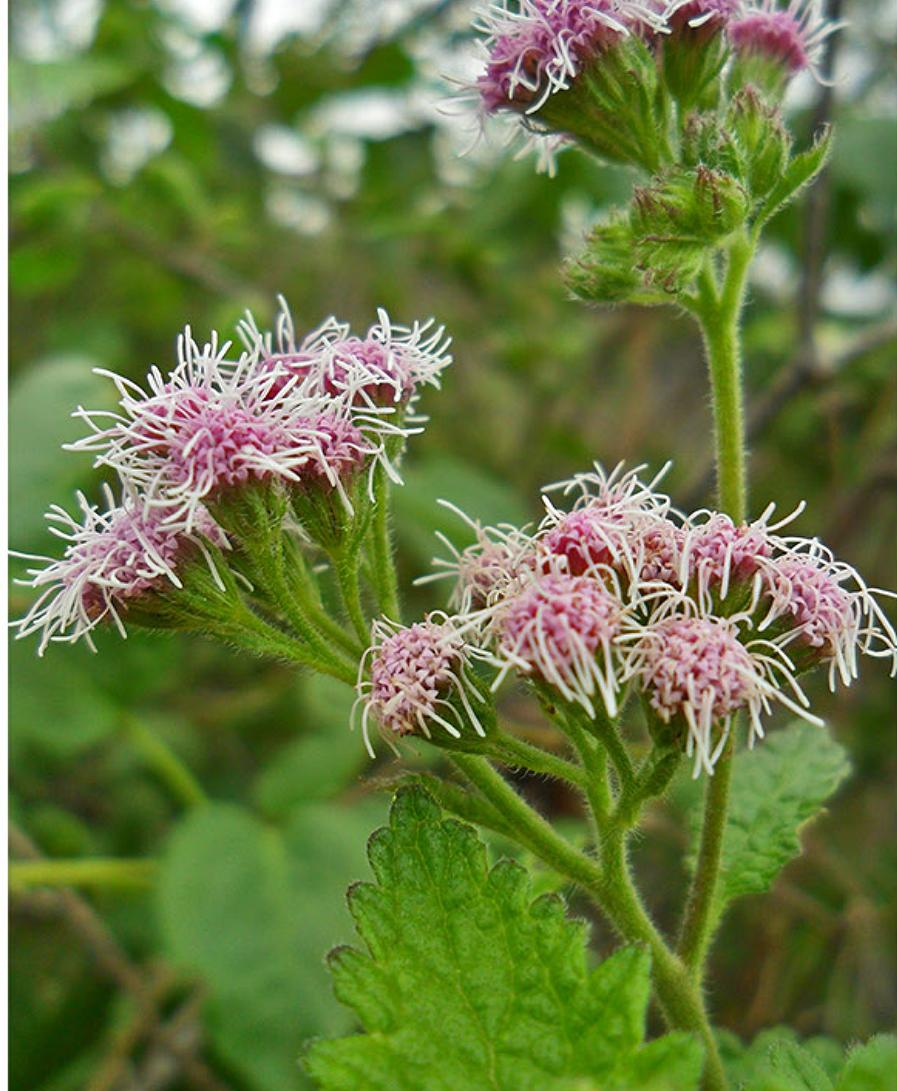

Scientific classification
- Kingdom: Plantae
- Clade: Tracheophytes
- Clade: Angiosperms
- Clade: Eudicots
- Clade: Asterids
- Order: Asterales
- Family: Asteraceae
- Subfamily: Asteroideae
- Tribe: Eupatorieae
- Genus: Conocliniopsis; R.M.King & H.Rob.
- Species: C. grossedentata

Binomial name
- Conocliniopsis grossedentata (Mart. ex Colla) D.J.N.Hind

Synonyms
- Eupatorium grossedentatum Mart. ex Colla; Conocliniopsis prasiifolia (DC.) R.M.King & H.Rob.; Conoclinium prasiifolium DC.; Eupatorium ballotifolium var. caucense B.L.Rob.; Eupatorium nepetoides Lindl. ex Baker, not validly publ.

= Conocliniopsis =

Genus of flowering plants

Conocliniopsis is a genus of flowering plants in the family Asteraceae. It contains a single species, Conocliniopsis grossedentata, which was referred to by its synonym Conocliniopsis prasiifolia until it was discovered to be conspecific with the type material of the earlier name in 2022.
