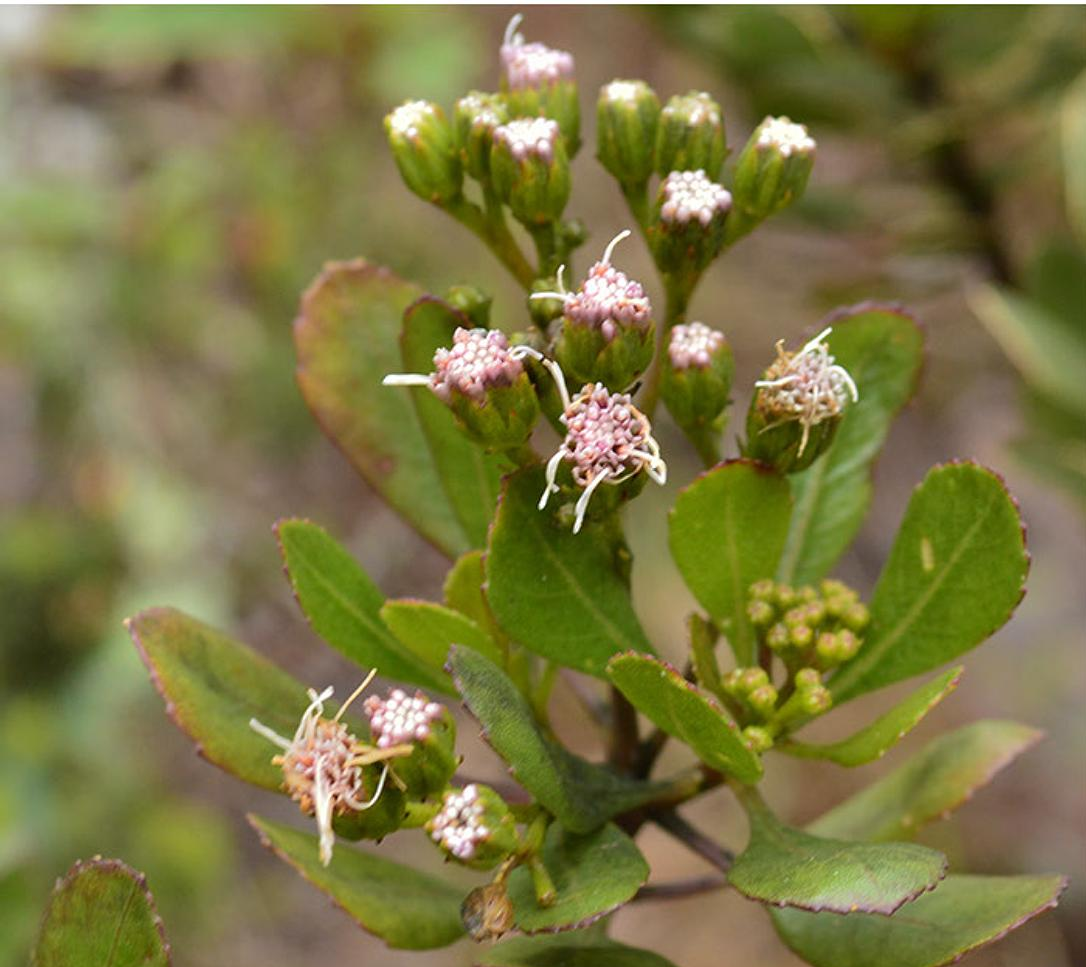

Scientific classification
- Kingdom: Plantae
- Clade: Tracheophytes
- Clade: Angiosperms
- Clade: Eudicots
- Clade: Asterids
- Order: Asterales
- Family: Asteraceae
- Subfamily: Asteroideae
- Tribe: Eupatorieae
- Genus: Bahianthus; R.M.King & H.Rob.
- Species: B. viscosus

Binomial name
- Bahianthus viscosus (Spreng.) R.M.King & H.Rob.

Synonyms
- Mikania viscosa Spreng.; Gochnatia discoidea (Less.) Cabrera; Eupatorium harvardianum Steyerm.; Kuhnia baccharoides DC.; Gyptis baccharoides Sch.Bip. ex Baker; Willoughbya viscosa (Spreng.) Kuntze

= Bahianthus =

Genus of flowering plants

Bahianthus is a genus of flowering plants in the family Asteraceae.

There is only one known species, Bahianthus viscosus, endemic to Brazil (States of Bahia and Espírito Santo).
