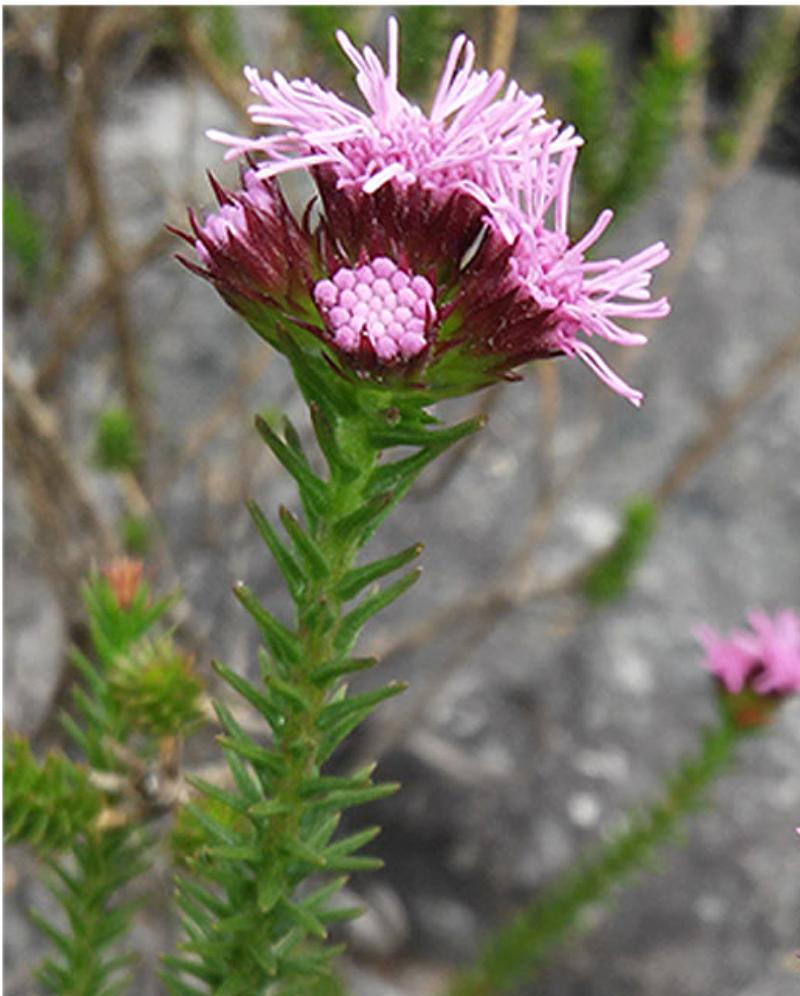
- Agrianthus empetrifolius

Scientific classification
- Kingdom: Plantae
- Clade: Embryophytes
- Clade: Tracheophytes
- Clade: Angiosperms
- Clade: Eudicots
- Clade: Asterids
- Order: Asterales
- Family: Asteraceae
- Subfamily: Asteroideae
- Tribe: Eupatorieae
- Genus: Agrianthus; Mart. ex DC.

Type species
- Agrianthus campestris Mart. ex DC.

= Agrianthus =

Genus of flowering plants

Agrianthus is a genus of flowering plants in the family Asteraceae described as a genus in 1836.

The entire genus is endemic to Brazil.

Species

- Agrianthus almasensis D.J.N.Hind
- Agrianthus campestris Mart. ex DC.
- Agrianthus carvalhoi D.J.N.Hind
- Agrianthus empetrifolius Mart. ex DC.
- Agrianthus giuliettiae D.J.N.Hind
- Agrianthus leutzelburgii Mattf.
- Agrianthus microlicioides Mattf.
- Agrianthus myrtoides Mattf.
- Agrianthus pungens Mattf.
