= Erythradenia =

Scientific classification
- Kingdom: Plantae
- Clade: Embryophytes
- Clade: Tracheophytes
- Clade: Angiosperms
- Clade: Eudicots
- Clade: Asterids
- Order: Asterales
- Family: Asteraceae
- Subfamily: Asteroideae
- Tribe: Eupatorieae
- Genus: Erythradenia (B.L.Rob.) R.M.King & H.Rob
- Species: E. pyramidalis

Binomial name
- Erythradenia pyramidalis (B.L.Rob.) R.M.King & H.Rob

Synonyms
- Piqueria subg. Erythradenia B.L.Rob.; Decachaeta pyramidalis (B.L.Rob.) S.D.Sundb., C.P.Cowan & B.L.Turner

Genus of flowering plants

Erythradenia is a genus of flowering plants in the family Asteraceae.

There is only one known species, Erythradenia pyramidalis, endemic to Mexico (Guerrero, México State, Michoacán, Jalisco).
