= Lorentzianthus =

Scientific classification
- Kingdom: Plantae
- Clade: Embryophytes
- Clade: Tracheophytes
- Clade: Angiosperms
- Clade: Eudicots
- Clade: Asterids
- Order: Asterales
- Family: Asteraceae
- Subfamily: Asteroideae
- Tribe: Eupatorieae
- Genus: Lorentzianthus; R.M. King & H. Rob.
- Species: L. viscidus

Binomial name
- Lorentzianthus viscidus (Hook. & Arn.) R.M.King & H.Rob.

Synonyms
- Eupatorium viscidum Hook. & Arn.; Eupatorium erythrolepis Sch.Bip.; Eupatorium nemorense Sch.Bip. ex Baker; Eupatorium viscidum var. protractum Griseb.; Eupatorium santacruzense Hieron.

Genus of flowering plants

Lorentzianthus is a monotypic genus of South American flowering plants in the boneset tribe within the sunflower family. The only known species is Lorentzianthus viscidus, native to Bolivia and Argentina.
