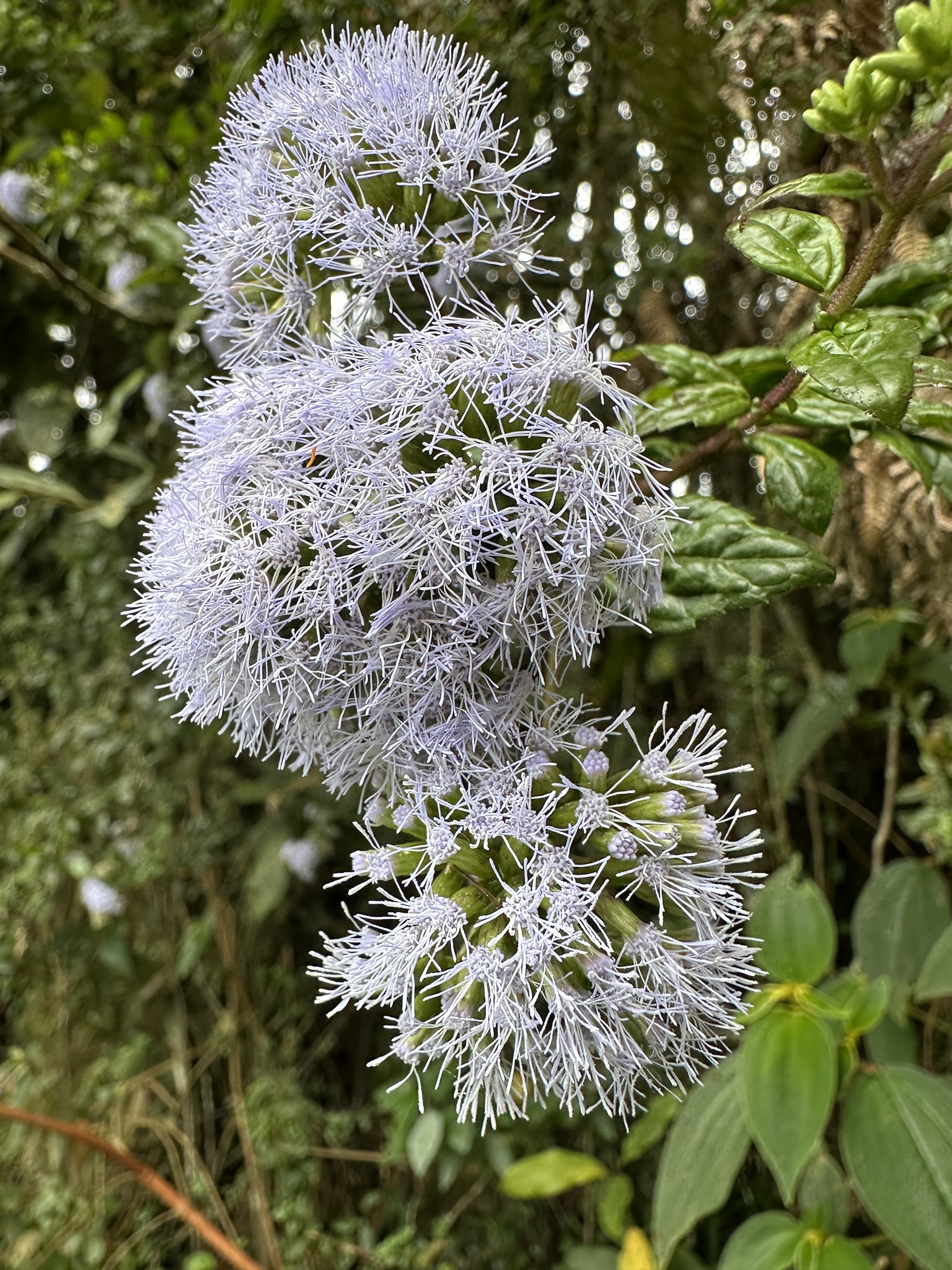
- Asplundianthus arcuans in Colombia

Scientific classification
- Kingdom: Plantae
- Clade: Embryophytes
- Clade: Tracheophytes
- Clade: Angiosperms
- Clade: Eudicots
- Clade: Asterids
- Order: Asterales
- Family: Asteraceae
- Subfamily: Asteroideae
- Tribe: Eupatorieae
- Genus: Asplundianthus; R.M.King & H.Rob.

= Asplundianthus =

Genus of flowering plants

Asplundianthus is a genus of flowering plants in the family Asteraceae.

The genus is named in honor of Swedish botanist Erik Asplund.

Species

All known species are native to northwestern South America.

- Asplundianthus arcuans – Colombia
- Asplundianthus densus – Colombia
- Asplundianthus pseudoglomeratus – Ecuador
- Asplundianthus pseudostuebelii – Ecuador, Colombia
- Asplundianthus sagasteguii – Peru
- Asplundianthus scabrifolius – Peru
- Asplundianthus smilacinoides – Ecuador
- Asplundianthus smilacinus – Venezuela, Ecuador, Colombia
- Asplundianthus stuebelii – Ecuador, Peru
- Asplundianthus toroi – Colombia
- Asplundianthus trachyphyllus – Peru
