= Amolinia =

Scientific classification
- Kingdom: Plantae
- Clade: Tracheophytes
- Clade: Angiosperms
- Clade: Eudicots
- Clade: Asterids
- Order: Asterales
- Family: Asteraceae
- Subfamily: Asteroideae
- Tribe: Eupatorieae
- Genus: Amolinia; R.M.King & H.Rob
- Species: A. heydeana

Binomial name
- Amolinia heydeana (B.L.Rob.) R.M.King & H.Rob.

Synonyms
- Eupatorium heydeanum B.L.Rob. (type species)

Genus of flowering plants

Amolinia is a genus of flowering plants in the family Asteraceae, described as a genus in 1972.

There is only one known species, Amolinia heydeana, native to Chiapas and Guatemala.
