= Blakeanthus =

Scientific classification
- Kingdom: Plantae
- Clade: Embryophytes
- Clade: Tracheophytes
- Clade: Angiosperms
- Clade: Eudicots
- Clade: Asterids
- Order: Asterales
- Family: Asteraceae
- Subfamily: Asteroideae
- Tribe: Eupatorieae
- Genus: Blakeanthus; R.M.King & H.Rob.
- Species: B. cordatus

Binomial name
- Blakeanthus cordatus (S.F.Blake) R.M.King & H.Rob.

Synonyms
- Ageratum cordatum (S.F.Blake) L.O.Williams; Alomia cordata S.F.Blake

Genus of flowering plants

Blakeanthus is a genus of flowering plants in the family Asteraceae.

There is only one known species, Blakeanthus cordatus, native to Guatemala, El Salvador, and Honduras.
