= Gardnerina =

Scientific classification
- Kingdom: Plantae
- Clade: Tracheophytes
- Clade: Angiosperms
- Clade: Eudicots
- Clade: Asterids
- Order: Asterales
- Family: Asteraceae
- Subfamily: Asteroideae
- Tribe: Eupatorieae
- Genus: Gardnerina; R.M.King & H.Rob.
- Species: G. angustata

Binomial name
- Gardnerina angustata (Gardner) R.M.King & H.Rob.

Synonyms
- Alomia angustata (Gardner) Benth. ex Baker; Piqueria angustata Gardner

Genus of plants

Gardnerina is a genus of flowering plants in the family Asteraceae.

There is only one known species, Gardnerina angustata, endemic to the State of Goiás in Brazil.
