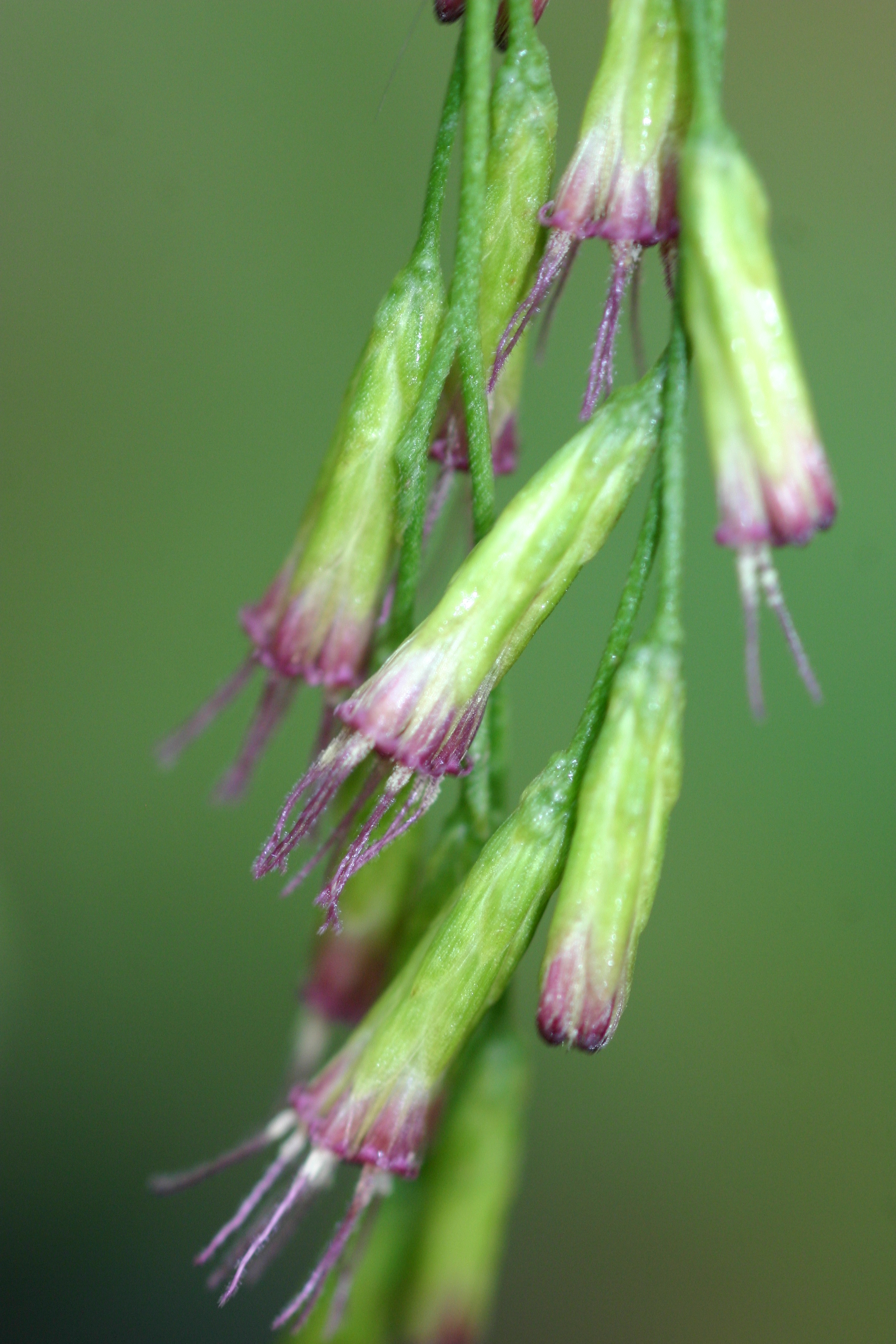
- Acanthostyles buniifolius

Scientific classification
- Kingdom: Plantae
- Clade: Embryophytes
- Clade: Tracheophytes
- Clade: Spermatophytes
- Clade: Angiosperms
- Clade: Eudicots
- Clade: Asterids
- Order: Asterales
- Family: Asteraceae
- Subfamily: Asteroideae
- Tribe: Eupatorieae
- Genus: Acanthostyles; R.M.King & H.Rob.

= Acanthostyles =

Genus of flowering plants

Acanthostyles is a genus of flowering plants in the family Asteraceae described as a genus in 1971.

The genus is native to South America.

Species

1. Acanthostyles buniifolius (Hook. ex Hook. & Arn.) R.M.King & H.Rob. - Rio Grande do Sul, Argentina, Bolivia, Paraguay, Uruguay
2. Acanthostyles saucechicoensis (Hieron.) R.M.King & H.Rob. - Argentina
