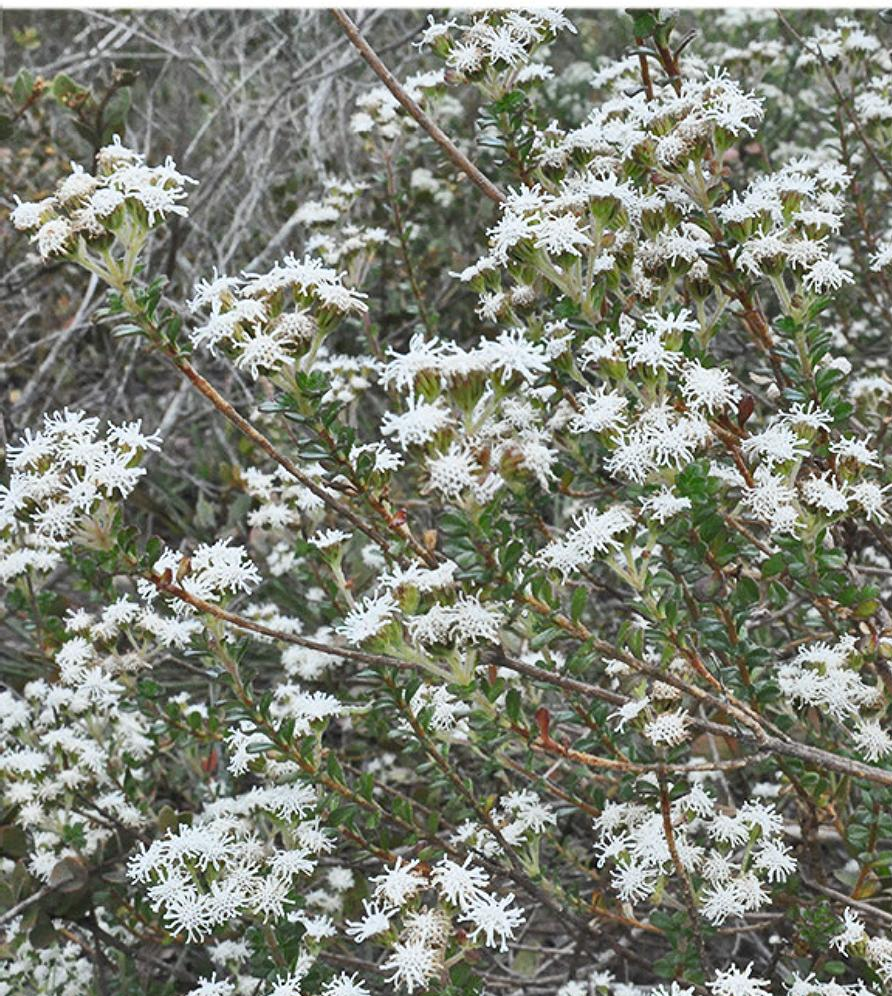
- Stylotrichium edmundoi

Scientific classification
- Kingdom: Plantae
- Clade: Tracheophytes
- Clade: Angiosperms
- Clade: Eudicots
- Clade: Asterids
- Order: Asterales
- Family: Asteraceae
- Subfamily: Asteroideae
- Tribe: Eupatorieae
- Genus: Stylotrichium; Mattf.

= Stylotrichium =

Genus of plants

Stylotrichium is a genus of Brazilian plants in the tribe Eupatorieae within the family Asteraceae.

Species

- Stylotrichium corymbosum (DC.) Mattf. - Bahia
- Stylotrichium edmundoi G.M.Barroso - Bahia
- Stylotrichium glomeratum Bautista, Rodr.Oubiña & S.Ortiz - Bahia
- Stylotrichium rotundifolium Mattf. - Bahia
- Stylotrichium sucrei R.M.King & H.Rob. - Bahia
