= Dasycondylus =

Scientific classification
- Kingdom: Plantae
- Clade: Embryophytes
- Clade: Tracheophytes
- Clade: Spermatophytes
- Clade: Angiosperms
- Clade: Eudicots
- Clade: Asterids
- Order: Asterales
- Family: Asteraceae
- Subfamily: Asteroideae
- Tribe: Eupatorieae
- Genus: Dasycondylus; R.M.King & H.Rob.

Genus of flowering plants

Dasycondylus is a genus of flowering plants in the family Asteraceae.

== Species ==
All the known species are native to South America, all but one endemic to Brazil.

- Dasycondylus debeauxii (B.L.Rob.) R.M.King & H.Rob. - Paraná, Rio de Janeiro, São Paulo
- Dasycondylus dusenii R.M.King & H.Rob. - Paraná
- Dasycondylus hirsutissimus (Baker) R.M.King & H.Rob. - Bahia
- Dasycondylus lobbii (Klatt) R.M.King & H.Rob. - Bolivia, Peru, Brazil
- Dasycondylus platylepis (Baker) R.M.King & H.Rob. - Goiás
- Dasycondylus regnellii R.M.King & H.Rob. - Minas Gerais
- Dasycondylus resinosus (Spreng.) R.M.King & H.Rob. - Paraná, Rio de Janeiro, São Paulo, Espírito Santo
- Dasycondylus riedelii R.M.King & H.Rob.Paraná – Minas Gerais
