= Imeria =

Scientific classification
- Kingdom: Plantae
- Clade: Tracheophytes
- Clade: Angiosperms
- Clade: Eudicots
- Clade: Asterids
- Order: Asterales
- Family: Asteraceae
- Subfamily: Asteroideae
- Tribe: Eupatorieae
- Genus: Imeria; R.M.King & H.Rob.

Type species
- Eupatorium memorabile Maguire & Wurdack

Genus of flowering plants

Imeria is a genus of South American flowering plants in the family Asteraceae.

Species

- Imeria memorabilis (Maguire & Wurdack) R.M.King & H.Rob. - Amazonas State in Venezuela, Amazonas State in Brazil
- Imeria serratifolia V.M.Badillo - Amazonas State in Venezuela
