= Dyscritogyne =

Scientific classification
- Kingdom: Plantae
- Clade: Embryophytes
- Clade: Tracheophytes
- Clade: Angiosperms
- Clade: Eudicots
- Clade: Asterids
- Order: Asterales
- Family: Asteraceae
- Subfamily: Asteroideae
- Tribe: Eupatorieae
- Genus: Dyscritogyne; R.M.King & H.Rob.

Genus of flowering plants

Dyscritogyne is a genus of Mexican flowering plants in the family Asteraceae.

Species

- Dyscritogyne adenosperma (Sch.Bip.) R.M.King & H.Rob. - Morelos, Nayarit, Durango, Jalisco, Guerrero, México State, Zacatecas, Michoacán
- Dyscritogyne dryophila (B.L.Rob.) R.M.King & H.Rob. - Nayarit, Zacatecas, Jalisco, Sinaloa
