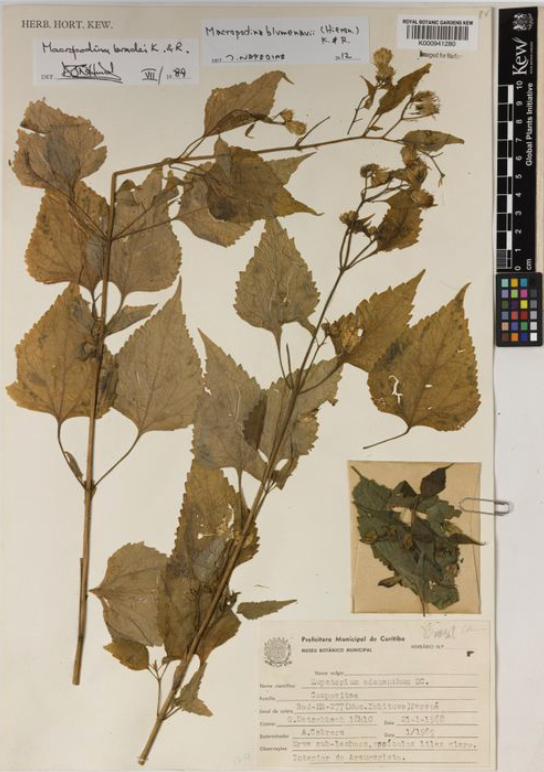
- Macropodina bradei

Scientific classification
- Kingdom: Plantae
- Clade: Embryophytes
- Clade: Tracheophytes
- Clade: Spermatophytes
- Clade: Angiosperms
- Clade: Eudicots
- Clade: Asterids
- Order: Asterales
- Family: Asteraceae
- Subfamily: Asteroideae
- Tribe: Eupatorieae
- Genus: Macropodina; R.M.King & H.Rob.

Type species
- Eupatorium blumenavii Hieron.

Synonyms
- Eupatorium sect. Macropodina (R.M.King & H.Rob.) Cabrera

= Macropodina =

Genus of flowering plants

Macropodina is a genus of South American flowering plants in the tribe Eupatorieae within the family Asteraceae.

Species

- Macropodina blumenavii (Hieron.) R.M.King & H.Rob. - Brazil (Paraná, Santa Catarina), Paraguay
- Macropodina bradei R.M.King & H.Rob. - Brazil (Rio de Janeiro, Paraná)
- Macropodina reitzii R.M.King & H.Rob. - Brazil (Santa Catarina)
