= Piqueriella =

Scientific classification
- Kingdom: Plantae
- Clade: Tracheophytes
- Clade: Angiosperms
- Clade: Eudicots
- Clade: Asterids
- Order: Asterales
- Family: Asteraceae
- Subfamily: Asteroideae
- Tribe: Eupatorieae
- Genus: Piqueriella; R.M.King & H.Rob.
- Species: P. brasiliensis

Binomial name
- Piqueriella brasiliensis R.M.King & H.Rob.

Genus of flowering plants

Piqueriella is a genus of a Brazilian plants in the tribe Eupatorieae within the family Asteraceae. The genus contains a single described species, Piqueriella brasiliensis, found only in the State of Ceará in northeastern Brazil.
