= Brickellia subuligera =

Scientific classification
- Kingdom: Plantae
- Clade: Tracheophytes
- Clade: Angiosperms
- Clade: Eudicots
- Clade: Asterids
- Order: Asterales
- Family: Asteraceae
- Genus: Brickellia
- Species: B. subuligera

Binomial name
- Brickellia subuligera (S. Schauer) B.L.Turner

Synonyms
- Bulbostylis subuligera S. Schauer 1847; Barroetea subuligera var. latisquama Greenm.; Barroetea subuligera (S. Schauer) A. Gray; Eupatorium subuligerum (S. Schauer) A. Gray

Species of flowering plant

Brickellia subuligera is a Mexican species of flowering plants in the family Asteraceae. It is widespread across much of northern and central Mexico, from Tamaulipas west to Chihuahua and south as far as Guerrero.
