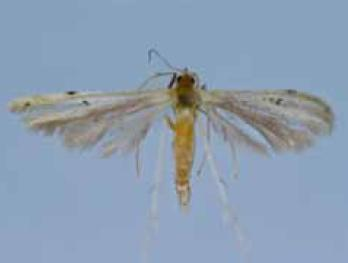

Scientific classification
- Kingdom: Animalia
- Phylum: Arthropoda
- Class: Insecta
- Order: Lepidoptera
- Family: Pterophoridae
- Genus: Adaina
- Species: A. bipunctatus

Binomial name
- Adaina bipunctatus (Möschler, 1890)

Synonyms
- Pterophorus bipunctatus Möschler, 1890

= Adaina bipunctatus =

Species of plume moth

Adaina bipunctatus is a moth of the family Pterophoridae. It is found in the United States (including Florida and Mississippi), the Caribbean (Trinidad, Bahamas, Puerto Rico, Virgin Islands, Guadeloupe) and South America (Brazil and Ecuador).

The wingspan is 9–11.5 mm. Adults are entirely pale yellowish white, although the head is touched with pale brownish above and on the front. The forewings have a few brown scales and several brown spots. The fringes are slightly tinged with grey, as are the hindwings and their fringes.

Adults are on wing from January to May, August and December; in Florida they have been recorded from the end of March to the end of June and again from mid-August to mid-December.

The larvae feed on Conoclinium coelestinum, Carphephorus paniculatus, Carphephorus odoratissimus, Pluchea rosea, Eupatorium cannabinum, and many others.
