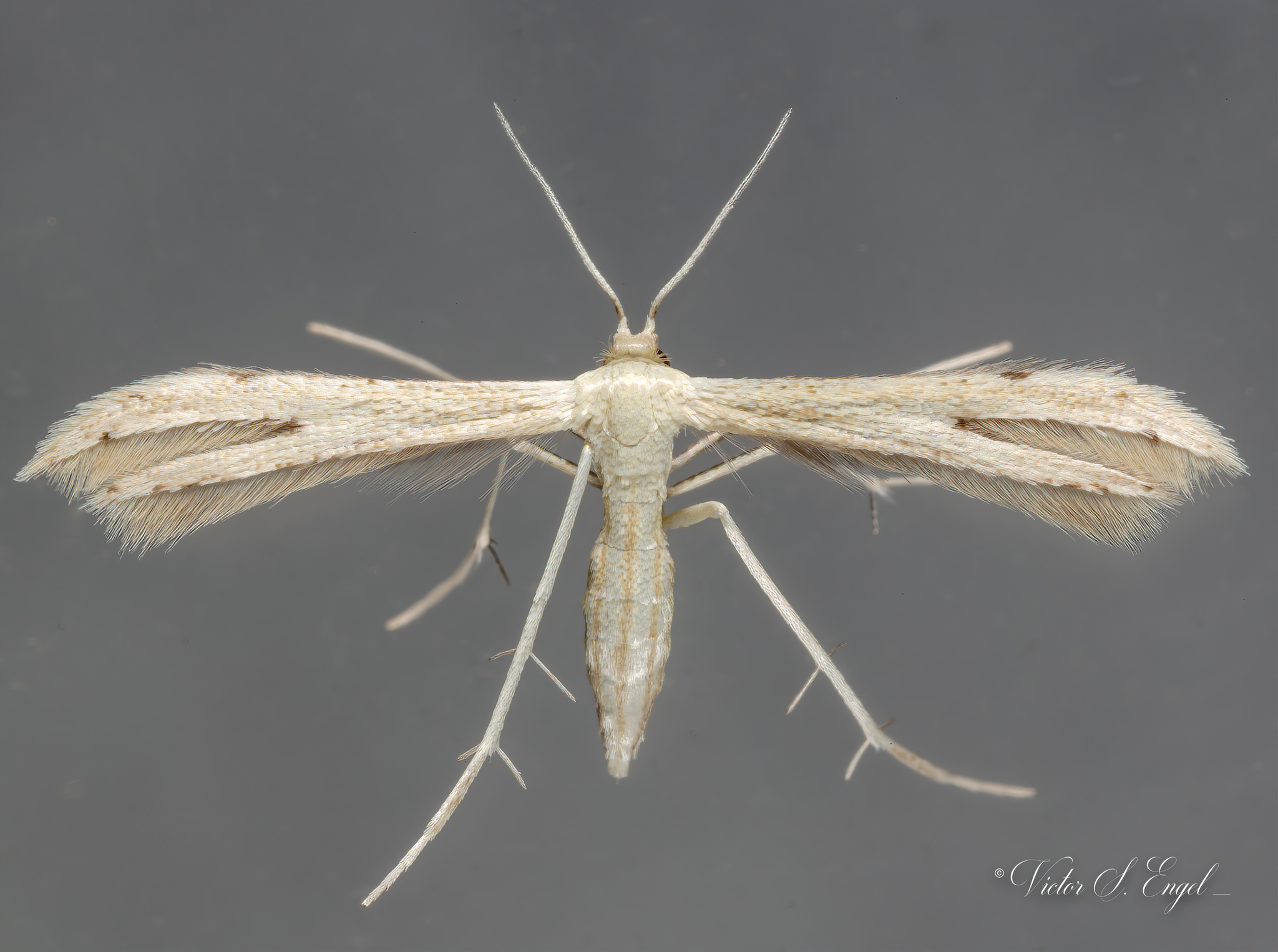

Scientific classification
- Kingdom: Animalia
- Phylum: Arthropoda
- Clade: Pancrustacea
- Class: Insecta
- Order: Lepidoptera
- Family: Pterophoridae
- Genus: Adaina
- Species: A. simplicius

Binomial name
- Adaina simplicius (Grossbeck, 1917)

Synonyms
- Pterophorus simplicius Grossbeck, 1917; Adaina naiadopa Meyrick, 1931

= Adaina simplicius =

Species of plume moth

Adaina simplicius is a species of moth in the family Pterophoridae. It is found in the United States (including Puerto Rico, Mississippi and Florida), Brazil, Costa Rica, Ecuador, and Paraguay. It was introduced to South Africa for study as a biological control agent for Eupatorium macrocephalum.

The wingspan is about 10 mm. The head is pale yellowish, tinged with brownish especially on the vertex. The thorax is pale straw yellow. The forewings are very pale straw yellow, the costa with a few brown scales, a small patch of similarly colored scales on the costa beyond the incision and another near the center of the wing at the incision. A few more brown scales are found on the inner edge of both lobes near the apex. The hindwings are smoky.

The larvae feed on various composites, including Carphephorus odoratissimus, Carphephorus paniculatus, Conoclinium coelestinum and Pluchea odorata.
