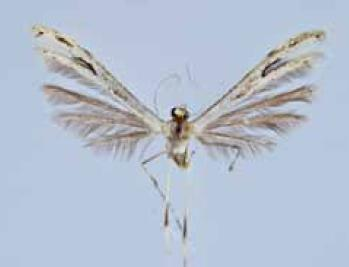

Scientific classification
- Kingdom: Animalia
- Phylum: Arthropoda
- Clade: Pancrustacea
- Class: Insecta
- Order: Lepidoptera
- Family: Pterophoridae
- Genus: Adaina
- Species: A. fuscahodias

Binomial name
- Adaina fuscahodias Gielis, 1992

= Adaina fuscahodias =

Species of plume moth

Adaina fuscahodias is a moth of the family Pterophoridae. It is found in Mexico (Veracruz), Costa Rica, and Brazil.

The wingspan is 15–17 millimetres (0.59–0.67 in). Adults have been recorded in February, July, August and December. The larvae feed on Verbesina species, Senecio brasiliensis, and Vernonanthura mariana.

== Etymology ==
The name refers to the close resemblance in genitalia with Adaina hodias and the striking darker area on the forewing.
