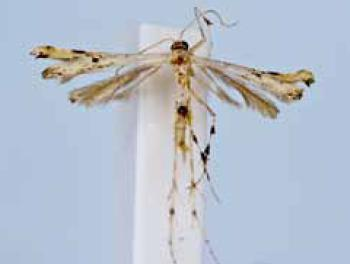

Scientific classification
- Kingdom: Animalia
- Phylum: Arthropoda
- Clade: Pancrustacea
- Class: Insecta
- Order: Lepidoptera
- Family: Pterophoridae
- Genus: Adaina
- Species: A. parainvida

Binomial name
- Adaina parainvida Gielis, 1992

= Adaina parainvida =

Species of plume moth

Adaina parainvida is a moth of the family Pterophoridae. It is found in Costa Rica and on Jamaica.

The wingspan is 11–13 mm. Adults have been recorded in July.

== Etymology ==
The species is called parainvida because of the resemblance in the male genitalia to Adaina invida.
