= Trilisa =

Scientific classification
- Kingdom: Plantae
- Clade: Embryophytes
- Clade: Tracheophytes
- Clade: Angiosperms
- Clade: Eudicots
- Clade: Asterids
- Order: Asterales
- Family: Asteraceae
- Subfamily: Asteroideae
- Tribe: Eupatorieae
- Genus: Trilisa (Cass.) Cass.

Type species
- Trilisa odoratissima (Willd.) Cass.

Synonyms
- Liatris subg. Trilisa Cass.

Genus of flowering plants

Trilisa is a genus of flowering plants in the tribe Eupatorieae within the family Asteraceae.

Some taxonomists group Trilisa and Litrisa into the genus Carphephorus.

Species

- Trilisa odoratissima (J.F.Gmel.) Cass. - Louisiana, Mississippi, Alabama, Georgia, Florida, North and South Carolina
- Trilisa paniculata (J.F.Gmel.) Cass. - Alabama, Georgia, Florida, North and South Carolina
