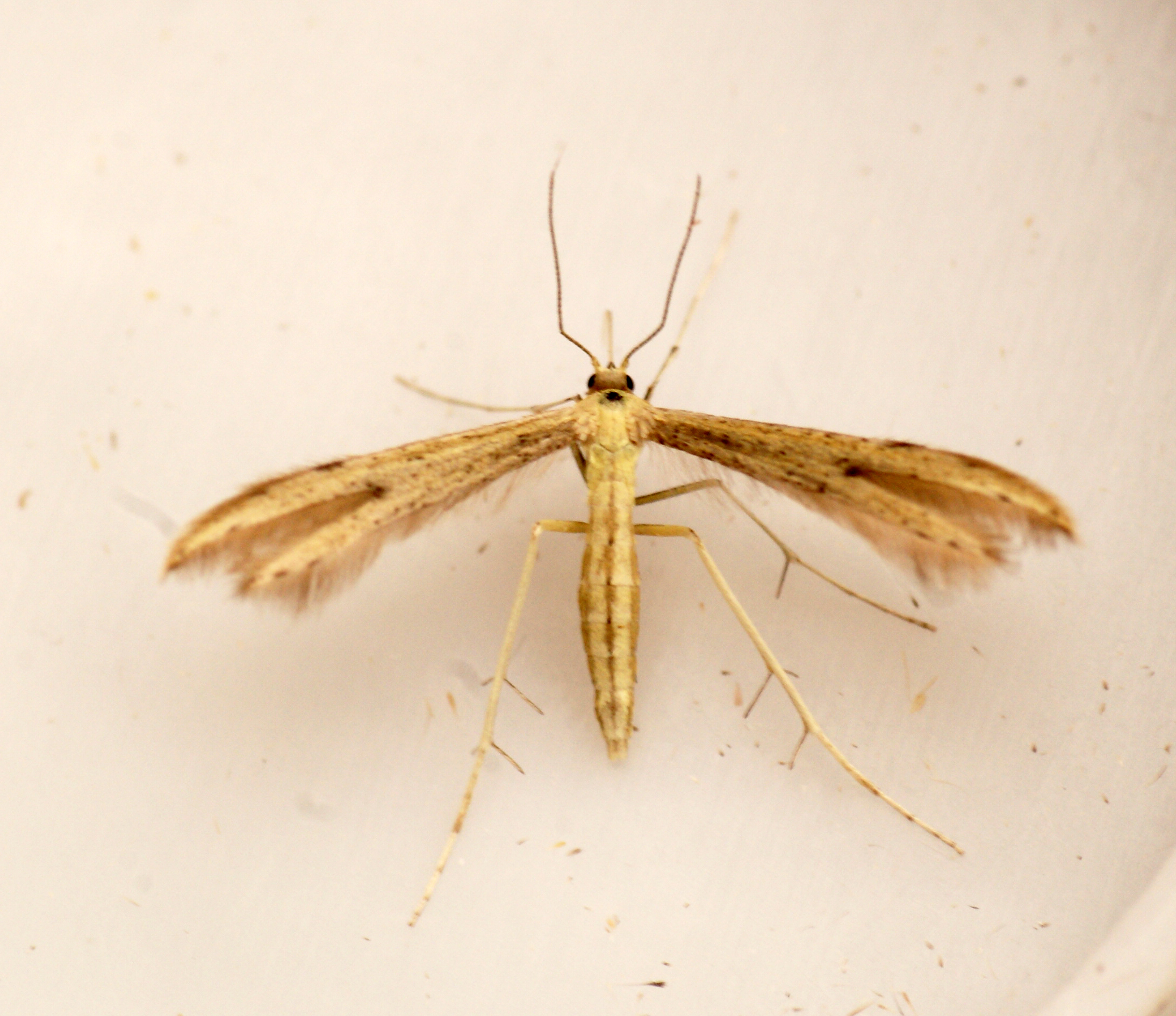

Scientific classification
- Kingdom: Animalia
- Phylum: Arthropoda
- Class: Insecta
- Order: Lepidoptera
- Family: Pterophoridae
- Genus: Adaina
- Species: A. microdactyla

Binomial name
- Adaina microdactyla (Hübner, 1813)

Synonyms
- List: Alucita microdactyla Hubner, 1813; Pterophorus microdactylus; Leioptilus microdactylus; Adaina microdactylus; Pterophorus carphodactylus Stephens, 1834; Adaina montivola Meyrick, 1928; Adaina subflavescens Meyrick, 1930; Oidaematophorus madecasseus Gibeaux, 1994

= Adaina microdactyla =

Species of plume moth

Adaina microdactyla is a moth of the family Pterophoridae first described by Jacob Hübner in 1813. Also known as the hemp-agrimony plume, it is found in Africa, Asia and Europe.

The wingspan is 13–17 mm. The forewings are whitish yellowish, sprinkled with blackish. There is a dot in disc at 1/3, a mark at the base of the fissure and a distinct mark on costa beyond the fissure, a less distinct one towards apex, and some blackish indistinct dots on margins of segments. The hindwings are grey. The flesh-colour larva has a slightly paler dorsal line and numerous rough points on the dorsum. The head is pale yellowish-brown.

Adults are on wing in May and June and again in August in two generations in western Europe.

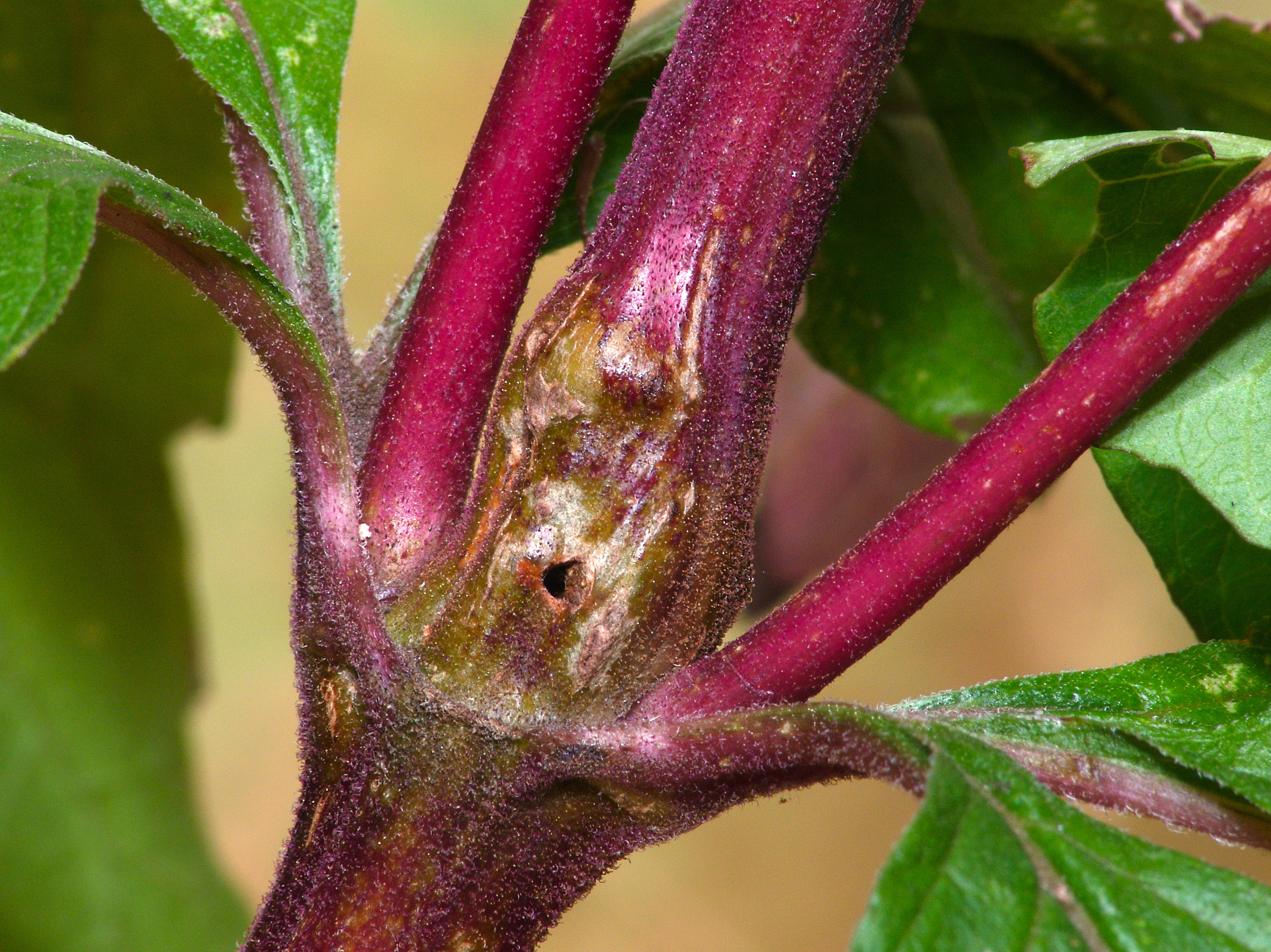
larval feeding signs on Eupatorium cannabinum

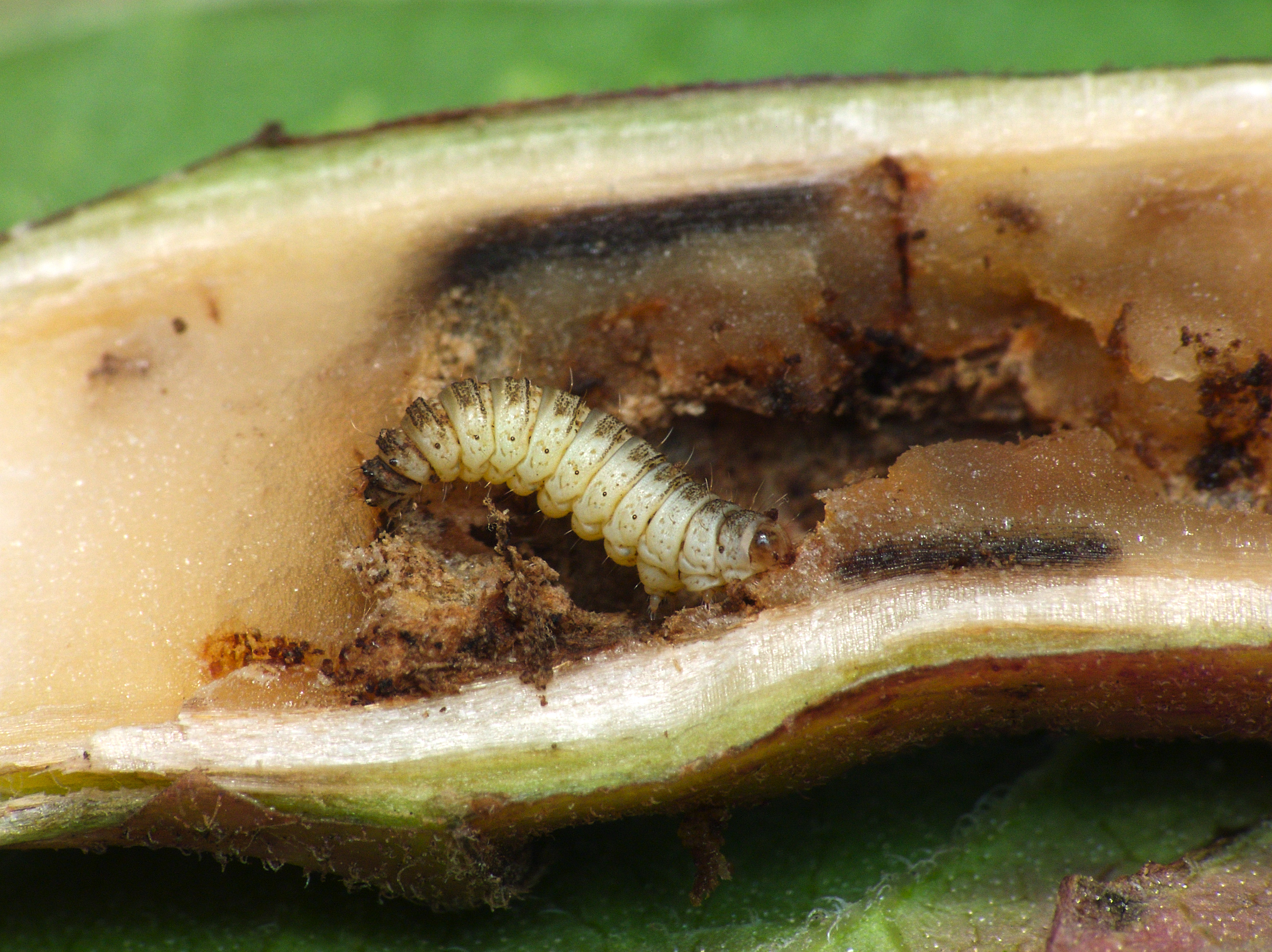
larva

The larvae feed on hemp-agrimony (Eupatorium cannabinum), Indian camphorweed (Pluchea indica), European goldenrod (Solidago virgaurea) and Brassica species. There are two broods, one which bores in stems and produces galls, the other which feeds in flowers, although flower feeding has not been recently confirmed.

== Distribution ==
It has a wide distribution and is known from the Palearctic realm (from Europe to Korea, Japan and China), Asia Minor, Iran, Vietnam, the Solomon Islands, the Philippines, Sri Lanka, Indonesia and Papua New Guinea. It is also found in Africa, including the Democratic Republic of the Congo and Madagascar.
