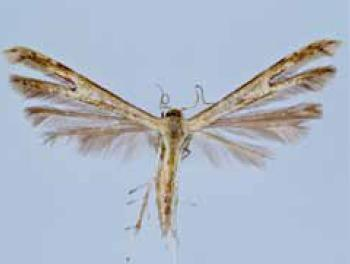
- Adaina atahualpa

Scientific classification
- Domain: Eukaryota
- Kingdom: Animalia
- Phylum: Arthropoda
- Class: Insecta
- Order: Lepidoptera
- Family: Pterophoridae
- Tribe: Oidaematophorini
- Genus: Adaina; Tutt, 1905

Synonyms
- Paravinculia Cåpuse, 1987

= Adaina =

Plume moth genus

Adaina is a genus of moths in the family Pterophoridae. The genus was erected in 1905 by J. W. Tutt. Several of its species have gall-inducing larvae, such as Adaina primulacea, of which the larvae induce stem galls on Chromolaena odorata, and Adaina microdactyla, which induces stem galls on Eupatorium cannabinum.

== Species ==
As of version 1.1.23.125, the Catalogue of the Pterophoroidea of the World lists the following 42 species for genus Adaina:

- Adaina ambrosiae (Murtfeldt, 1880)
- Adaina atahualpa Gielis, 2011
- Adaina beckeri Gielis, 1992
- Adaina bernardi Gielis, 1992
- Adaina bipunctatus (Möschler, 1890)
- Adaina bolivari (Cåpuse, 1987)
- Adaina cinerascens (Walsingham, 1880)
- Adaina coquimboae Gielis, 2012
- Adaina costarica Gielis, 1992
- Adaina desolata Arenberger & Bond, 1995
- Adaina everdinae Gielis, 1991
- Adaina excreta Meyrick, 1930
- Adaina fuscahodias Gielis, 1992
- Adaina gentilis Meyrick, 1911
- Adaina hodias (Meyrick, 1908)
- Adaina invida (Meyrick, 1908)
- Adaina ipomoeae Bigot & Etienne, 2009
- Adaina jequie Gielis, 2016
- Adaina jobimi Vargas, 2020
- Adaina kihonda Gielis, 2011
- Adaina microdactoides Gielis, 2003
- Adaina microdactyla (Hübner, [1813])
- Adaina montanus (Walsingham, 1880)
- Adaina nina Ustjuzhanin & Kovtunovich, 2022
- Adaina obscura Gielis, 1999
- Adaina parainvida Gielis, 1992
- Adaina periarga Meyrick, 1913
- Adaina perplexus (Grossbeck, 1917)
- Adaina pittieri Gielis, 2014
- Adaina planaltina Gielis, 1992
- Adaina praeusta (Möschler, 1890)
- Adaina primulacea Meyrick, 1929
- Adaina propria Meyrick, 1921
- Adaina quieta Gielis, 2012
- Adaina recta Gielis, 2012
- Adaina santacruzae Gielis, 2013
- Adaina scalesiae Landry, Roque-Albelo & Matthews, 2004
- Adaina simplicius (Grossbeck, 1917)
- Adaina sinuari Gielis, 2012
- Adaina thomae (Zeller, 1877)
- Adaina villagrani (Gielis, 2013)
- Adaina zephyria Barnes & Lindsey, 1921
