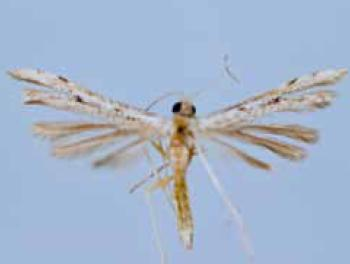

Scientific classification
- Kingdom: Animalia
- Phylum: Arthropoda
- Class: Insecta
- Order: Lepidoptera
- Family: Pterophoridae
- Genus: Adaina
- Species: A. thomae

Binomial name
- Adaina thomae (Zeller, 1877)

Synonyms
- Leioptilus thomae Zeller, 1877

= Adaina thomae =

Species of plume moth

Adaina thomae is a moth of the family Pterophoridae. It is known from Florida, Mexico, the Caribbean (Virgin Islands, including the eponymous Saint Thomas, Puerto Rico, Bahamas, Cuba, Hispaniola), Venezuela, and Brazil.

The wingspan is about 13 mm. Adults have been recorded in February, July, August, October and December.
