= Litrisa =

Scientific classification
- Kingdom: Plantae
- Clade: Tracheophytes
- Clade: Angiosperms
- Clade: Eudicots
- Clade: Asterids
- Order: Asterales
- Family: Asteraceae
- Subfamily: Asteroideae
- Tribe: Eupatorieae
- Genus: Litrisa; Small
- Species: L. carnosa

Binomial name
- Litrisa carnosa Small

Synonyms
- Trilisa carnosa (Small) B.L.Rob.; Carphephorus carnosus (Small) C.W.James

Genus of flowering plants

Litrisa is a genus of flowering plants in the tribe Eupatorieae within the family Asteraceae. There is only one known species, Litrisa carnosa, called pineland chaffhead, native to the State of Florida in the United States. Some taxonomists group Litrisa and Trilisa into the genus Carphephorus.

A shrub, it grows up to 90 cm (3 feet) tall and is covered with many small hairs and produced flat-topped inflorescences of many small purplish flower heads.
