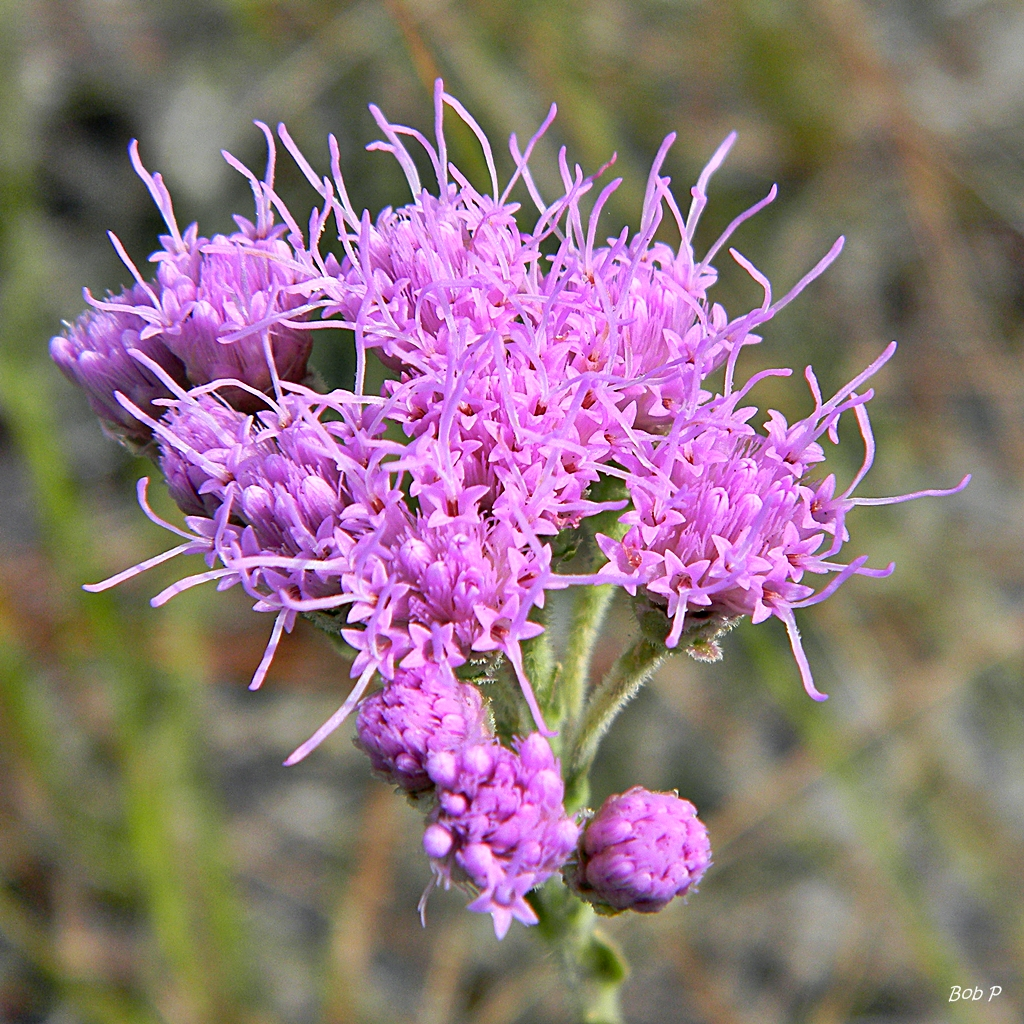

Conservation status
- Apparently Secure (NatureServe)

Scientific classification
- Kingdom: Plantae
- Clade: Tracheophytes
- Clade: Angiosperms
- Clade: Eudicots
- Clade: Asterids
- Order: Asterales
- Family: Asteraceae
- Genus: Carphephorus
- Species: C. corymbosus

Binomial name
- Carphephorus corymbosus (Nutt.) Torr. & A.Gray 1841

Synonyms
- Liatris corymbosa Nutt. 1818

= Carphephorus corymbosus =

Species of flowering plant

Carphephorus corymbosus, the Florida paintbrush or coastal plain chaffhead, is a species of North American plant in the family Asteraceae. They are native to the southeastern United States in the States of Florida, Georgia, and South Carolina.

== Description ==
Carphephorus corymbosus is an herb up to 120 cm (4 feet) tall. It produces a flat-topped inflorescence with many small purplish flower heads containing disc florets but no ray florets. Its habitats include sand hills, sandy open woodlands and pine barrens.

== Distribution and habitat ==
C. corymbosus is found in the sandy uplands of Florida, Georgia, and South Carolina. In south-central Florida, it is exclusively found in pine flatwoods, savannas, and pine flatwoods. C. corymbosus thrives in open light conditions, and is capable of growing in areas disturbed by humans, including bulldozed areas, around powerlines, roadsides, and clearings.

== Gallery ==
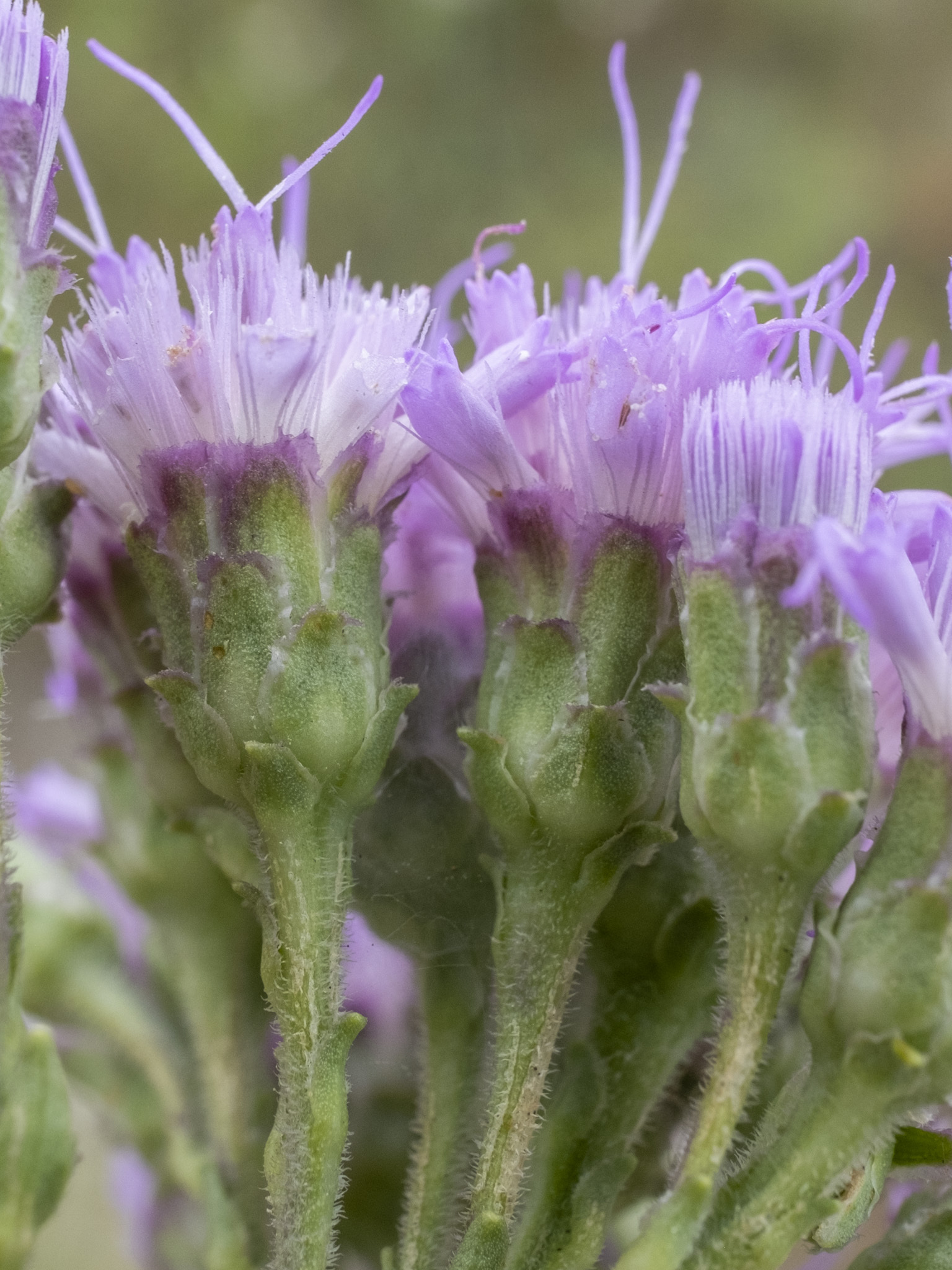
Involucral bracts

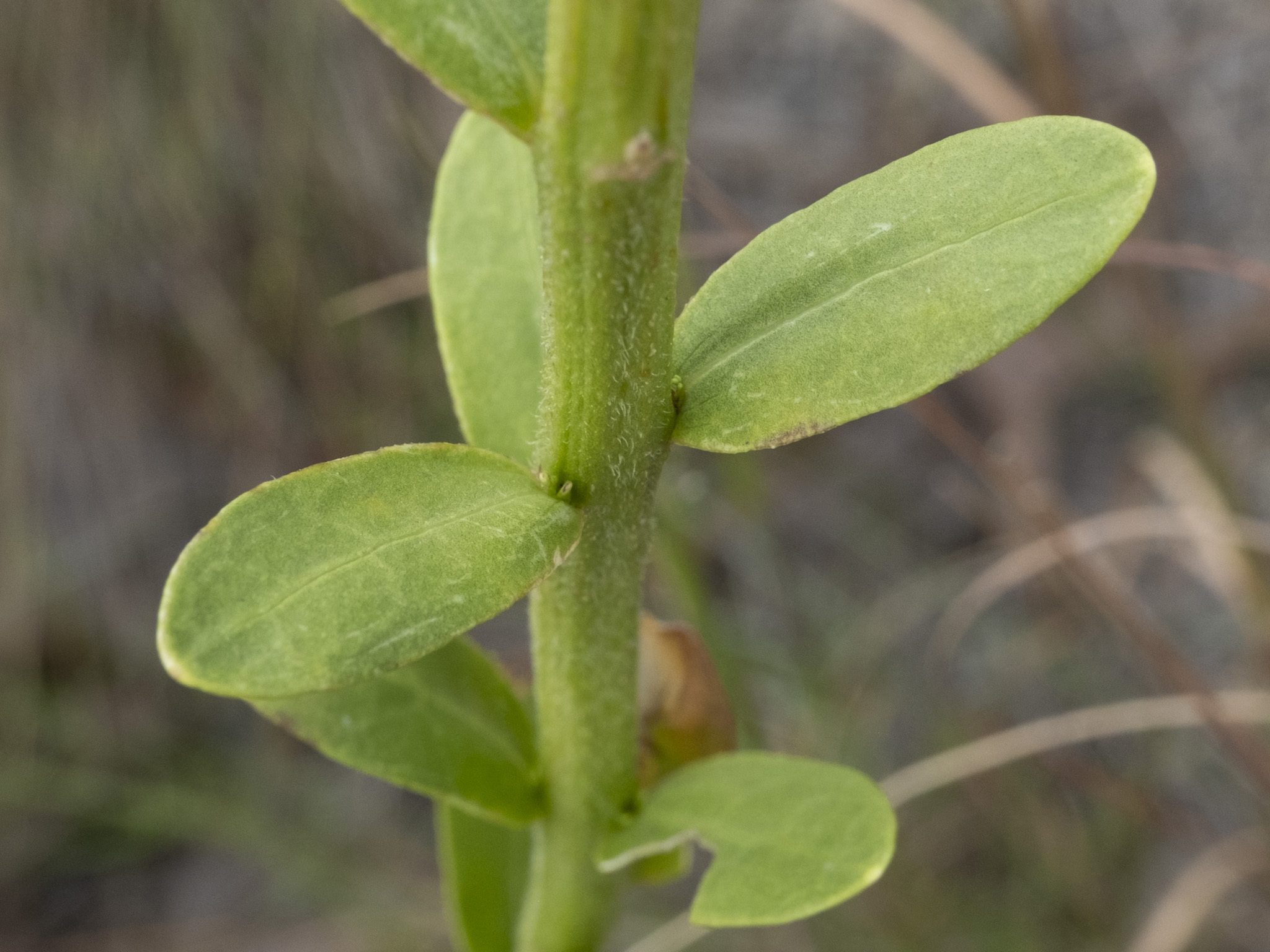
Cauline leaves

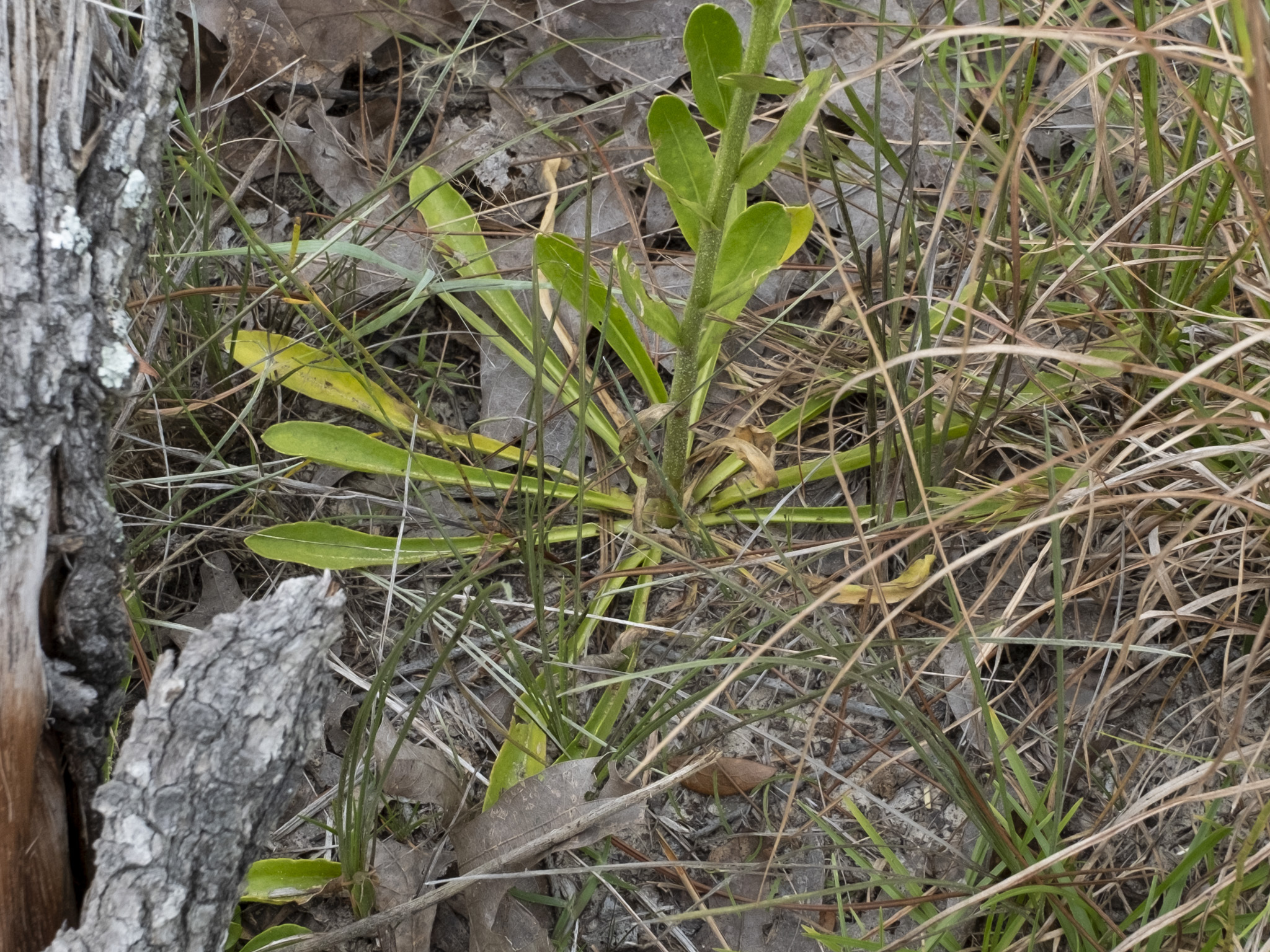
Basal leaves

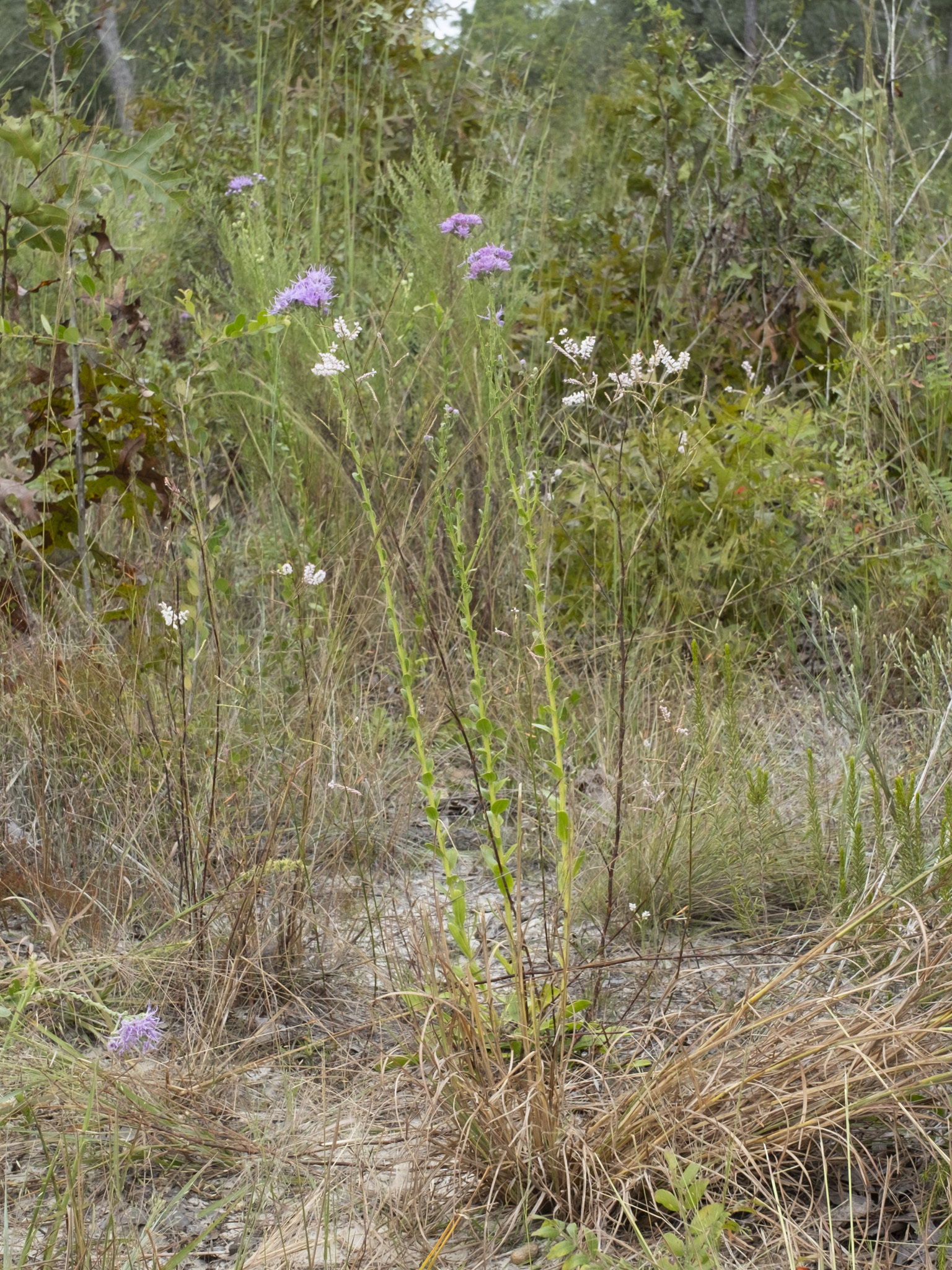
Habit

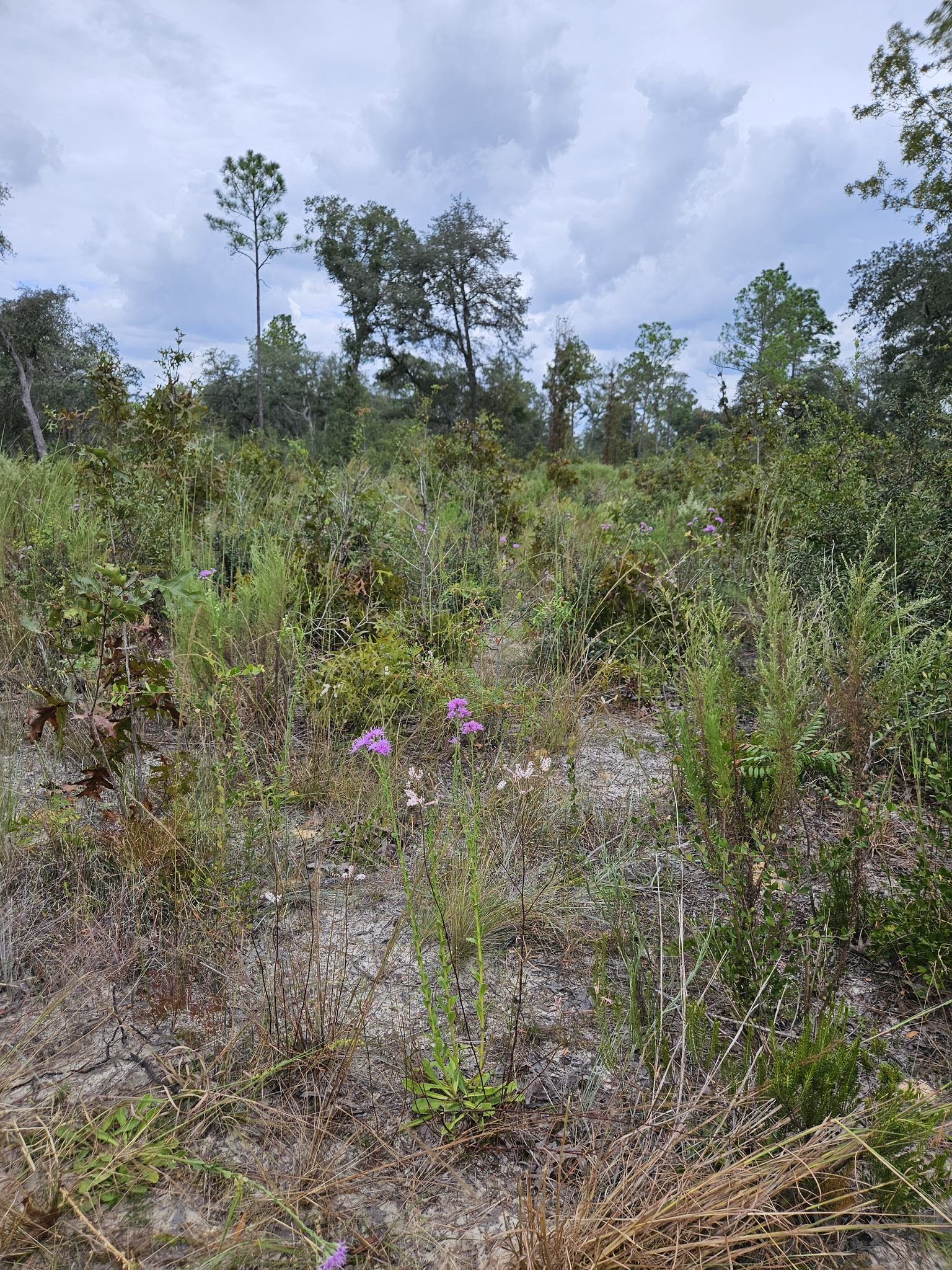
Habitat
