= Adaina cinerascens =

Scientific classification
- Kingdom: Animalia
- Phylum: Arthropoda
- Class: Insecta
- Order: Lepidoptera
- Family: Pterophoridae
- Genus: Adaina
- Species: A. cinerascens

Binomial name
- Adaina cinerascens (Walsingham, 1880)

Synonyms
- Aciptilus cinerascens Walsingham, 1880

Species of plume moth

Adaina cinerascens is a moth of the family Pterophoridae. It is found in North America (including California, Nevada, Utah, Oregon, Alberta and British Columbia)

The wingspan is about 19 mm. The head is slightly ochreous and the antennae are pubescent, pale ochreous. The thorax is whitish, especially in front, where two indistinct dark lines run forward to the head. The abdomen is pale ochreous and the legs are whitish, the fore and middle pairs tinged with brown on the inner side. The forewings are very pale ochreous, dusted thickly with brownish, forming a large spot before the base of the fissure. There is a subcostal spot before the middle and two small costal spots on the outer half of the first lobe. The fringes below the apex of first lobe and on the apex of the second lobe are dark brown. They are pale subochreous within the fissure, with a brownish spot on the hind margin. The hindwings and fringes are pale cinereous (ash-grey) and the underside is pale brownish.

The larvae have been recorded feeding on Balsamorhiza sagittata. They are found on the underside of the leaves of their host plant.
