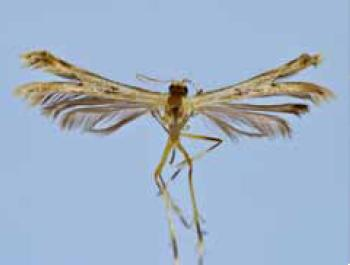

Scientific classification
- Kingdom: Animalia
- Phylum: Arthropoda
- Clade: Pancrustacea
- Class: Insecta
- Order: Lepidoptera
- Family: Pterophoridae
- Genus: Adaina
- Species: A. bernardi

Binomial name
- Adaina bernardi Gielis, 1992

= Adaina bernardi =

Species of plume moth

Adaina bernardi is a moth of the family Pterophoridae. It is found in Costa Rica and Mexico.

The wingspan is about 15 mm. Adults have been recorded in July, August and December.

== Etymology ==
The species is named after Bernard Landry.
