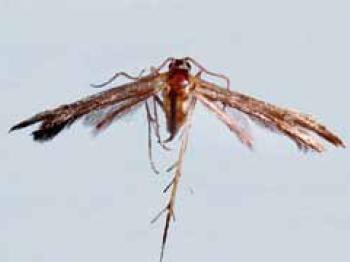

Scientific classification
- Kingdom: Animalia
- Phylum: Arthropoda
- Class: Insecta
- Order: Lepidoptera
- Family: Pterophoridae
- Genus: Adaina
- Species: A. obscura

Binomial name
- Adaina obscura Gielis, 1999

= Adaina obscura =

Species of plume moth

Adaina obscura is a moth of the family Pterophoridae. It is found in Costa Rica.

The wingspan is 12 mm. The forewings are grey‑brown. The hindwings and fringes are grey‑brown. Adults are on wing in July.
