= Adaina gentilis =

Scientific classification
- Kingdom: Animalia
- Phylum: Arthropoda
- Class: Insecta
- Order: Lepidoptera
- Family: Pterophoridae
- Genus: Adaina
- Species: A. gentilis

Binomial name
- Adaina gentilis Meyrick, 1911

Species of plume moth

Adaina gentilis is a moth in the family Pterophoridae. It is known from South Africa.
