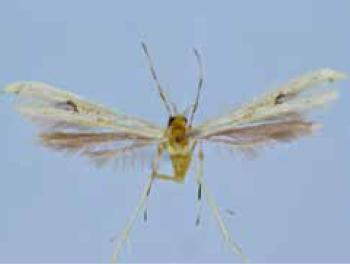

Scientific classification
- Kingdom: Animalia
- Phylum: Arthropoda
- Clade: Pancrustacea
- Class: Insecta
- Order: Lepidoptera
- Family: Pterophoridae
- Genus: Adaina
- Species: A. beckeri

Binomial name
- Adaina beckeri Gielis, 1992

= Adaina beckeri =

Species of plume moth

Adaina beckeri is a moth of the family Pterophoridae. It is known from Costa Rica and Belize.

The wingspan is about 14 mm. Adults have been recorded in July.

== Etymology ==
The species is named after its collector, Dr. V.O. Becker.
