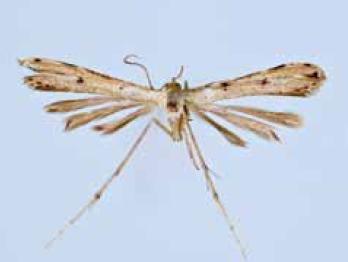

Scientific classification
- Kingdom: Animalia
- Phylum: Arthropoda
- Class: Insecta
- Order: Lepidoptera
- Family: Pterophoridae
- Genus: Adaina
- Species: A. perplexus

Binomial name
- Adaina perplexus (Grossbeck, 1917)

Synonyms
- Pterophorus perplexus Grossbeck, 1917

= Adaina perplexus =

Species of plume moth

Adaina perplexus is a moth of the family Pterophoridae. It is found in the United States, including the Florida Everglades. It has also been recorded from Cuba and Trinidad.

The wingspan is about 14 mm. The head is pale ocherous-brown. The antennae are whitish annulated (ringed) with pale brown above. The thorax and abdomen are whitish, the latter usually with a black point on the posterior edge of each segment above, and with a similar series on the sides which may form a patch on the sixth segment. The forewings are creamy-white shaded with pale ocherous-brown and sprinkled with dark brown atoms, some of which form distinct spots. The fringes are dusky. The hindwings are uniform pale smoky, the fringes paler. Adults are on wing in January, March, April, May, July and October.

== Taxonomy ==
Some authors list Adaina perplexus as a synonym of Adaina ambrosiae.
