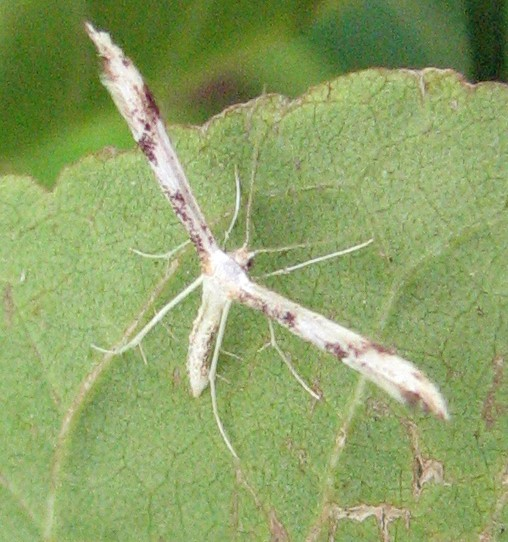

Scientific classification
- Kingdom: Animalia
- Phylum: Arthropoda
- Class: Insecta
- Order: Lepidoptera
- Family: Pterophoridae
- Genus: Adaina
- Species: A. montanus

Binomial name
- Adaina montanus (Walsingham, 1880)

Synonyms
- Aciptilus montanus Walsingham, 1880; Adaina montana; Pterophorus declivis Meyrick, 1913; Adaina declivis (Meyrick, 1913)

= Adaina montanus =

Species of plume moth

Adaina montanus is a moth of the family Pterophoridae. It is found in North America, including south-eastern Canada and the western and north-eastern United States.

The wingspan is about 16 mm. The head is white and the antennae are faintly dotted above with brownish. The thorax, abdomen and legs are snow white, although the fore and middle legs are brownish on the inner side. The forewings are snow white, sprinkled with ferruginous-brown scales, especially on the outer half of the costa. A spot of these scales is found before the base of the fissure and runs obliquely to a darker spot on the costa, which is nearly connected by a dark shade with another brown costal spot near the apex. There is a dark-brown fine streak on the outer half of the costa of the second lobe extending through the fringe under the apex. All of the rest of the fringe is snow white. The hindwings are dusted with cinereous (ash-grey) brown.

Adults have been recorded in July and August.

The larvae feed on Xanthium strumarium canadense and Symphyotrichum novi-belgii. Young larvae are found on the underside of the leaves of their host plant. Later, they can also be found on the upperside. Young larvae eat out the parenchyma, leaving the epidermis. First instar larvae are entirely white, except for the claws and mandibles. Later instars are pale green, although the eighth and ninth rings are yellow. When full-grown, the larvae are pale pea green, with a paler head and a dorsal stripe consisting of three white lines. The seventh, eighth and ninth rings yellow. Pupation takes place in a light green pupa, although some have a reddish stripe along the dorsal part of the abdomen.
