= Adaina propria =

Scientific classification
- Kingdom: Animalia
- Phylum: Arthropoda
- Class: Insecta
- Order: Lepidoptera
- Family: Pterophoridae
- Genus: Adaina
- Species: A. propria

Binomial name
- Adaina propria Meyrick, 1921

Species of plume moth

Adaina propria is a moth in the family Pterophoridae. It is known from Mozambique.
