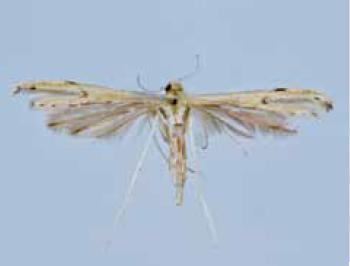

Scientific classification
- Kingdom: Animalia
- Phylum: Arthropoda
- Clade: Pancrustacea
- Class: Insecta
- Order: Lepidoptera
- Family: Pterophoridae
- Genus: Adaina
- Species: A. invida

Binomial name
- Adaina invida (Meyrick, 1908)

Synonyms
- Marasmarcha invida Meyrick, 1908

= Adaina invida =

Species of plume moth

Adaina invida is a moth of the family Pterophoridae. It is found in Brazil (São Paulo), Costa Rica, and Panama.

The wingspan is 12–13 millimetres (0.47–0.51 in). Adults have been recorded in February, July, and October. The larvae feed on Senecio brasiliensis.
