= Adaina praeusta =

Scientific classification
- Kingdom: Animalia
- Phylum: Arthropoda
- Clade: Pancrustacea
- Class: Insecta
- Order: Lepidoptera
- Family: Pterophoridae
- Genus: Adaina
- Species: A. praeusta

Binomial name
- Adaina praeusta (Möschler, 1890)

Synonyms
- Pterophorus praeusta Möschler, 1890

Species of plume moth

Adaina praeusta is a moth of the family Pterophoridae. It is only known from Puerto Rico.

The wing length is about 4 mm (0.16 in).
