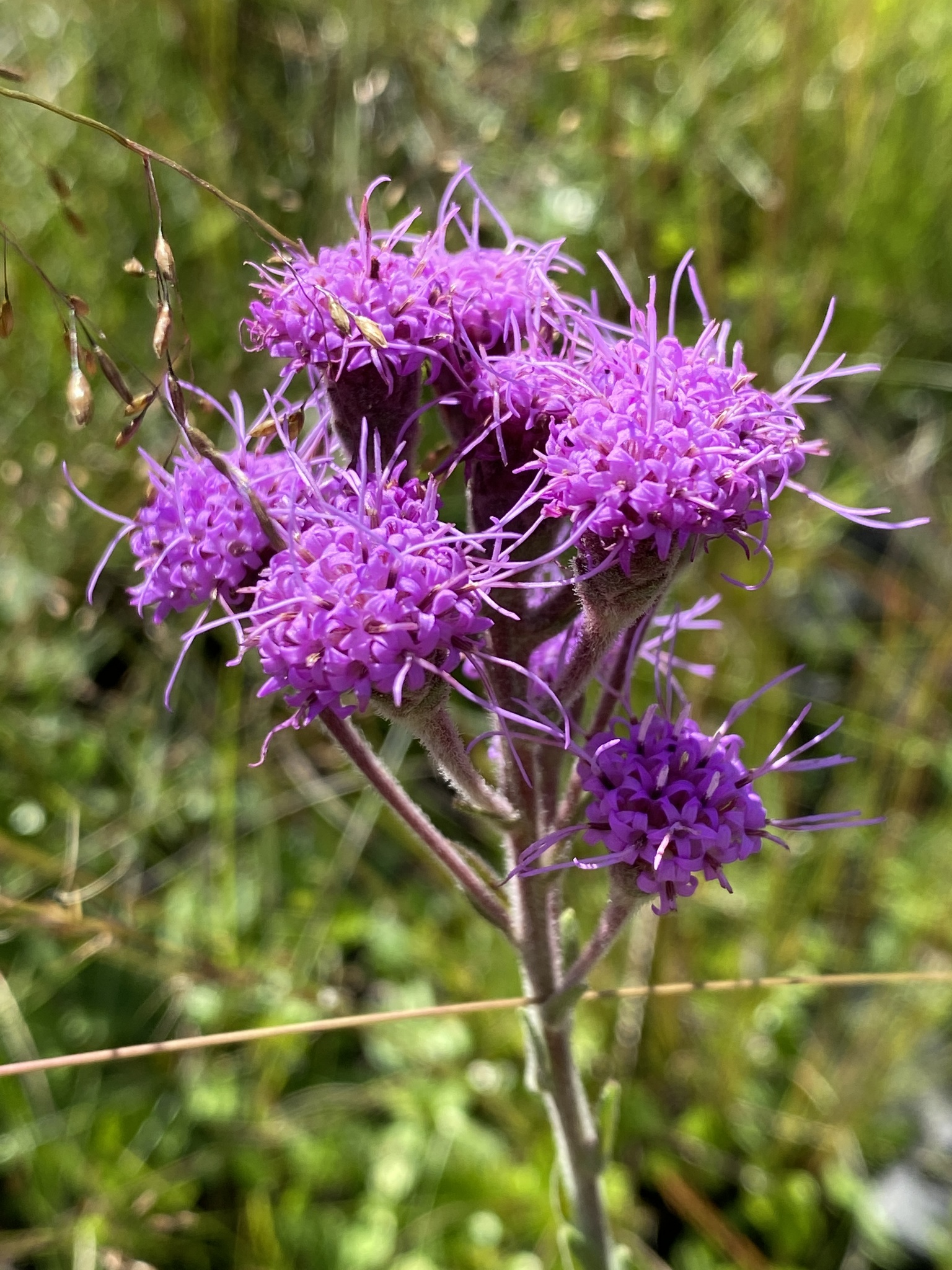

Scientific classification
- Kingdom: Plantae
- Clade: Embryophytes
- Clade: Tracheophytes
- Clade: Spermatophytes
- Clade: Angiosperms
- Clade: Eudicots
- Clade: Asterids
- Order: Asterales
- Family: Asteraceae
- Genus: Carphephorus
- Species: C. tomentosus

Binomial name
- Carphephorus tomentosus (Michx.) Torr. & A.Gray

Synonyms
- Carphephorus tomentosus var. walteri (Elliott) Fernald; Liatris tomentosa Michx.; Liatris walteri Elliott

= Carphephorus tomentosus =

Species of flowering plant

Carphephorus tomentosus, the woolly chaffhead, is a species of North American plants in the family Asteraceae. They are native to the southeastern United States in the states of Virginia, Georgia, North Carolina, and South Carolina.

Carphephorus tomentosus is an herb up to 80 cm (32 inches) tall, covered with many hairs resembling wool. It produces a flat-topped inflorescence with many small purplish flower heads containing disc florets but no ray florets.
