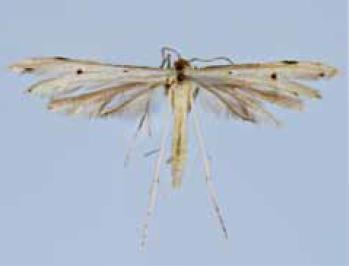

Scientific classification
- Kingdom: Animalia
- Phylum: Arthropoda
- Class: Insecta
- Order: Lepidoptera
- Family: Pterophoridae
- Genus: Adaina
- Species: A. bolivari

Binomial name
- Adaina bolivari (Capuse, 1987)

Synonyms
- Paravinculia bolivari Capuse, 1987

= Adaina bolivari =

Species of plume moth

Adaina bolivari or Paravinculia bolivari is a species of moth in the family Pterophoridae. It is found in Venezuela, Ecuador, Bolivia, and Brazil.

The wingspan is 12–14 mm (0.47–0.55 in). Adults are on wing from September to November.
