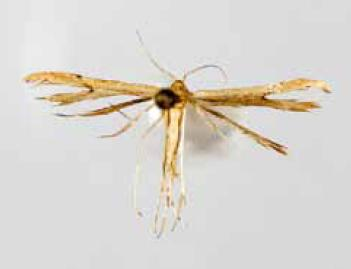

Scientific classification
- Kingdom: Animalia
- Phylum: Arthropoda
- Class: Insecta
- Order: Lepidoptera
- Family: Pterophoridae
- Genus: Adaina
- Species: A. zephyria

Binomial name
- Adaina zephyria Barnes & Lindsey, 1921

= Adaina zephyria =

Species of plume moth

Adaina zephyria is a moth of the family Pterophoridae. It was described by William Barnes and Arthur Ward Lindsey in 1921. It is widely distributed in the Americas, ranging from California (USA) through Mexico and Central America (recorded in Costa Rica) to South America (records from Venezuela, Ecuador, Peru, Bolivia, Brazil, Paraguay, and Argentina.

The wingspan is 14–17 mm. Adults are brownish white, but the head is slightly darker in front and above and pale between the antennae. These are dotted with brown above. The forewings have brown irroration (speckling), forming a vague spot in the middle of the cell. The hindwings and all fringes are almost the same color as the forewings. Adults are on wing from January to May and in September and October.
