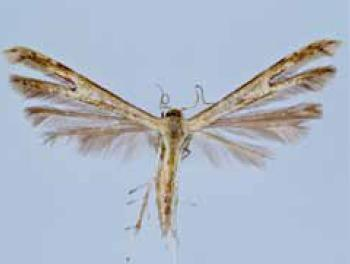

Scientific classification
- Kingdom: Animalia
- Phylum: Arthropoda
- Class: Insecta
- Order: Lepidoptera
- Family: Pterophoridae
- Genus: Adaina
- Species: A. atahualpa

Binomial name
- Adaina atahualpa Gielis, 2011

= Adaina atahualpa =

Species of plume moth

Adaina atahualpa is a moth of the family Pterophoridae. It is found in Colombia and Ecuador.

The wingspan is 12–15 mm. The forewings are ochreous-white and the markings are pale brown. The hindwings and fringes are grey-brown. Adults are on wing in May, September and October.

== Etymology ==
The species is named after Atahualpa, the last effective Inca emperor before the Spanish conquest.
