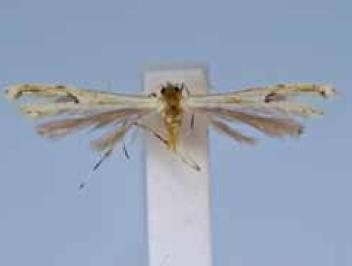

Scientific classification
- Kingdom: Animalia
- Phylum: Arthropoda
- Clade: Pancrustacea
- Class: Insecta
- Order: Lepidoptera
- Family: Pterophoridae
- Genus: Adaina
- Species: A. costarica

Binomial name
- Adaina costarica Gielis, 1992

= Adaina costarica =

Species of plume moth

Adaina costarica is a moth of the family Pterophoridae. It is found in Costa Rica.

The wingspan is 13–16 millimetres (0.51–0.63 in). Adults have been recorded in July.

== Etymology ==
The species is named after the country of its discovery.
