= Adaina microdactoides =

Scientific classification
- Kingdom: Animalia
- Phylum: Arthropoda
- Class: Insecta
- Order: Lepidoptera
- Family: Pterophoridae
- Genus: Adaina
- Species: A. microdactoides

Binomial name
- Adaina microdactoides Gielis, 2003

Species of plume moth

Adaina microdactoides is a moth of the family Pterophoridae. It is known from Luzon and Mindanao in the Philippines.

The wingspan is 13–14 mm. Adults are on wing in August and November.
