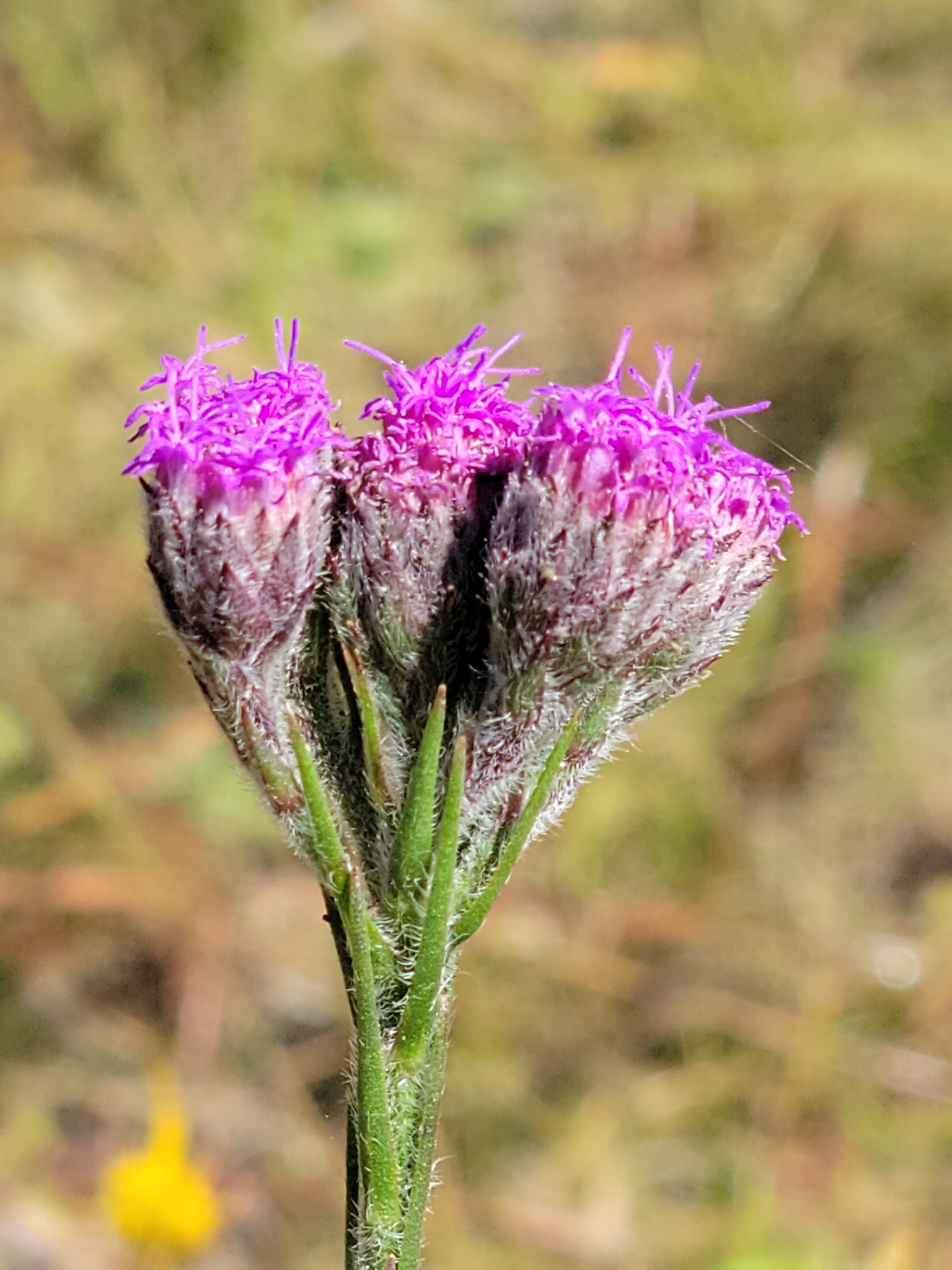

Scientific classification
- Kingdom: Plantae
- Clade: Embryophytes
- Clade: Tracheophytes
- Clade: Angiosperms
- Clade: Eudicots
- Clade: Asterids
- Order: Asterales
- Family: Asteraceae
- Genus: Carphephorus
- Species: C. pseudoliatris

Binomial name
- Carphephorus pseudoliatris Cass.

Synonyms
- Carphephorus pseudo-liatris Cass. 1816; Liatris squamosa Nutt. 1818

= Carphephorus pseudoliatris =

Species of flowering plant

Carphephorus pseudoliatris, the bristleleaf chaffhead, is a species of North American plants in the family Asteraceae. They are native to the southeastern United States in the states of Florida, Georgia, Alabama, Mississippi, and Louisiana.

Carphephorus pseudoliatris is an herb up to 100 cm (40 inches) tall. It produces a flat-topped inflorescence with many small purplish flower heads containing disc florets but no ray florets.
