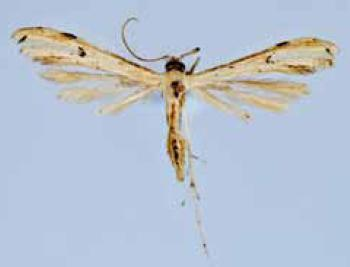

Scientific classification
- Kingdom: Animalia
- Phylum: Arthropoda
- Clade: Pancrustacea
- Class: Insecta
- Order: Lepidoptera
- Family: Pterophoridae
- Genus: Adaina
- Species: A. ipomoeae

Binomial name
- Adaina ipomoeae Bigot & Etienne, 2009

= Adaina ipomoeae =

Species of plume moth

Adaina ipomoeae is a moth of the family Pterophoridae. It is found in Cuba, Jamaica, Puerto Rico, Guadeloupe, the Dominican Republic, Grenada, and Florida.

== Description ==
The wingspan is 11–13 millimetres (0.43–0.51 in). The forewings are pale ochreous and the markings are dark brown. The hindwings and fringes are pale ochreous. Adults are on wing in January, August and October.

The larvae feed on Ipomoea tiliacea and Merremia umbellata.
