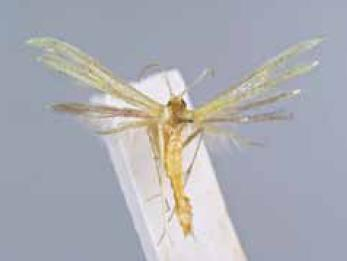

Scientific classification
- Kingdom: Animalia
- Phylum: Arthropoda
- Class: Insecta
- Order: Lepidoptera
- Family: Pterophoridae
- Genus: Adaina
- Species: A. primulacea

Binomial name
- Adaina primulacea Meyrick, 1929

= Adaina primulacea =

Species of plume moth

Adaina primulacea is a moth of the family Pterophoridae. It is known from Taboga Island in the Gulf of Panama, Costa Rica and southern Florida, United States. It is probably widespread throughout the Neotropics, including the West Indies and Central and South America.

The length of the forewings is 6–7 mm for males and 7–8 mm for females. Adults are on wing in September and December.

The larvae feed on Chromolaena odorata.
