= Adaina periarga =

Scientific classification
- Kingdom: Animalia
- Phylum: Arthropoda
- Class: Insecta
- Order: Lepidoptera
- Family: Pterophoridae
- Genus: Adaina
- Species: A. periarga

Binomial name
- Adaina periarga Meyrick, 1913

Synonyms
- Adaina periarcha Vári, 1958

Species of plume moth

Adaina periarga is a moth in the family Pterophoridae. It is known from South Africa.
