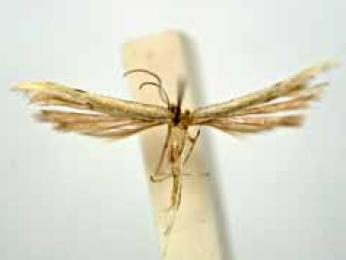

Scientific classification
- Kingdom: Animalia
- Phylum: Arthropoda
- Clade: Pancrustacea
- Class: Insecta
- Order: Lepidoptera
- Family: Pterophoridae
- Genus: Adaina
- Species: A. excreta

Binomial name
- Adaina excreta Meyrick, 1930

= Adaina excreta =

Species of plume moth

Adaina excreta is a moth of the family Pterophoridae. It is found in Peru (Carabaya), Argentina, and Ecuador.

The wingspan is 18 millimetres (0.71 in). Adults are on wing in January, June, October and November.
