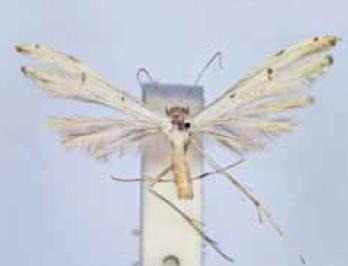

Scientific classification
- Kingdom: Animalia
- Phylum: Arthropoda
- Clade: Pancrustacea
- Class: Insecta
- Order: Lepidoptera
- Family: Pterophoridae
- Genus: Adaina
- Species: A. planaltina

Binomial name
- Adaina planaltina Gielis, 1992

= Adaina planaltina =

Species of plume moth

Adaina planaltina is a moth of the family Pterophoridae. It is found in the Federal District of Brazil.

The wingspan is about 15 mm. Adults have been recorded in August (mid-winter).

== Etymology ==
The species is named after the collecting area, Planaltina in Brazil.
