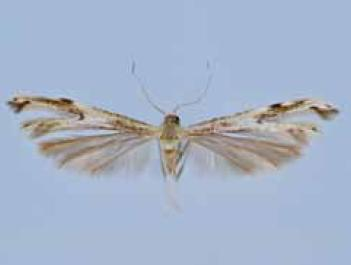

Scientific classification
- Kingdom: Animalia
- Phylum: Arthropoda
- Clade: Pancrustacea
- Class: Insecta
- Order: Lepidoptera
- Family: Pterophoridae
- Genus: Adaina
- Species: A. everdinae

Binomial name
- Adaina everdinae Gielis, 1991

= Adaina everdinae =

Species of plume moth

Adaina everdinae is a moth of the family Pterophoridae. It is known from Salta and Tucumán Provinces, Argentina.

The wingspan is 13 millimetres (0.51 in). Adults have been recorded in April and December.
