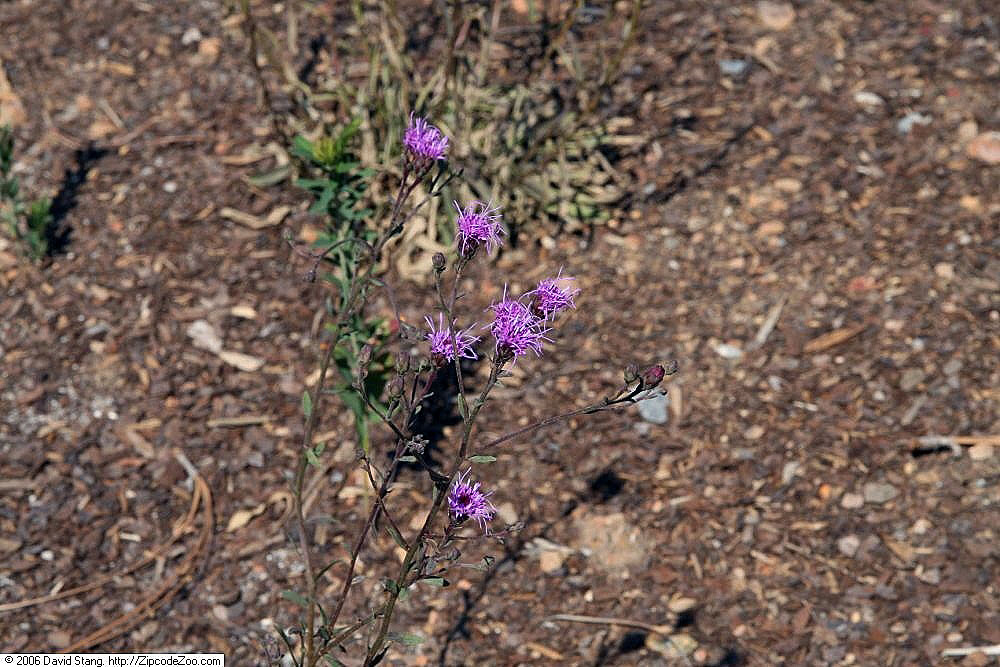

Scientific classification
- Kingdom: Plantae
- Clade: Tracheophytes
- Clade: Angiosperms
- Clade: Eudicots
- Clade: Asterids
- Order: Asterales
- Family: Asteraceae
- Genus: Carphephorus
- Species: C. bellidifolius

Binomial name
- Carphephorus bellidifolius (Michx.) Torr. & A.Gray

Synonyms
- Liatris bellidifolia Michx.

= Carphephorus bellidifolius =

Species of flowering plant

Carphephorus bellidifolius, the sandy-woods chaffhead, is a species of North American plants in the family Asteraceae. They are native to the southeastern United States in the States of Virginia, Georgia, North Carolina, and South Carolina.

Carphephorus bellidifolius is an herb up to 60 cm (24 inches) tall, largely without hairs. It produces an open, loose inflorescence with many small purplish flower heads containing disc florets but no ray florets.
