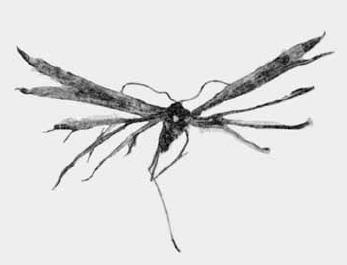

Scientific classification
- Kingdom: Animalia
- Phylum: Arthropoda
- Class: Insecta
- Order: Lepidoptera
- Family: Pterophoridae
- Genus: Adaina
- Species: A. desolata

Binomial name
- Adaina desolata Arenberger & Bond, 1995

= Adaina desolata =

Species of plume moth

Adaina desolata is a moth of the family Pterophoridae. It is found in Colombia.

The wingspan is 15 millimetres (0.59 in). The forewings are pale brown. Adults are on wing in August, at an altitude of 2,750 meters.
