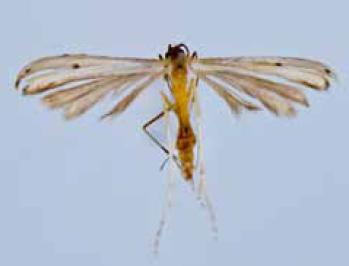

Scientific classification
- Kingdom: Animalia
- Phylum: Arthropoda
- Clade: Pancrustacea
- Class: Insecta
- Order: Lepidoptera
- Family: Pterophoridae
- Genus: Adaina
- Species: A. hodias

Binomial name
- Adaina hodias (Meyrick, 1908)

Synonyms
- Marasmarcha hodias Meyrick, 1908

= Adaina hodias =

Species of plume moth

Adaina hodias is a moth of the family Pterophoridae. It is found in Brazil (Mato Grosso, São Paulo), Costa Rica, Venezuela (Mérida), Ecuador, and Mexico.

The wingspan is 13–14 millimetres (0.51–0.55 in). Adults are on wing in February, April, July, August, October and December.
