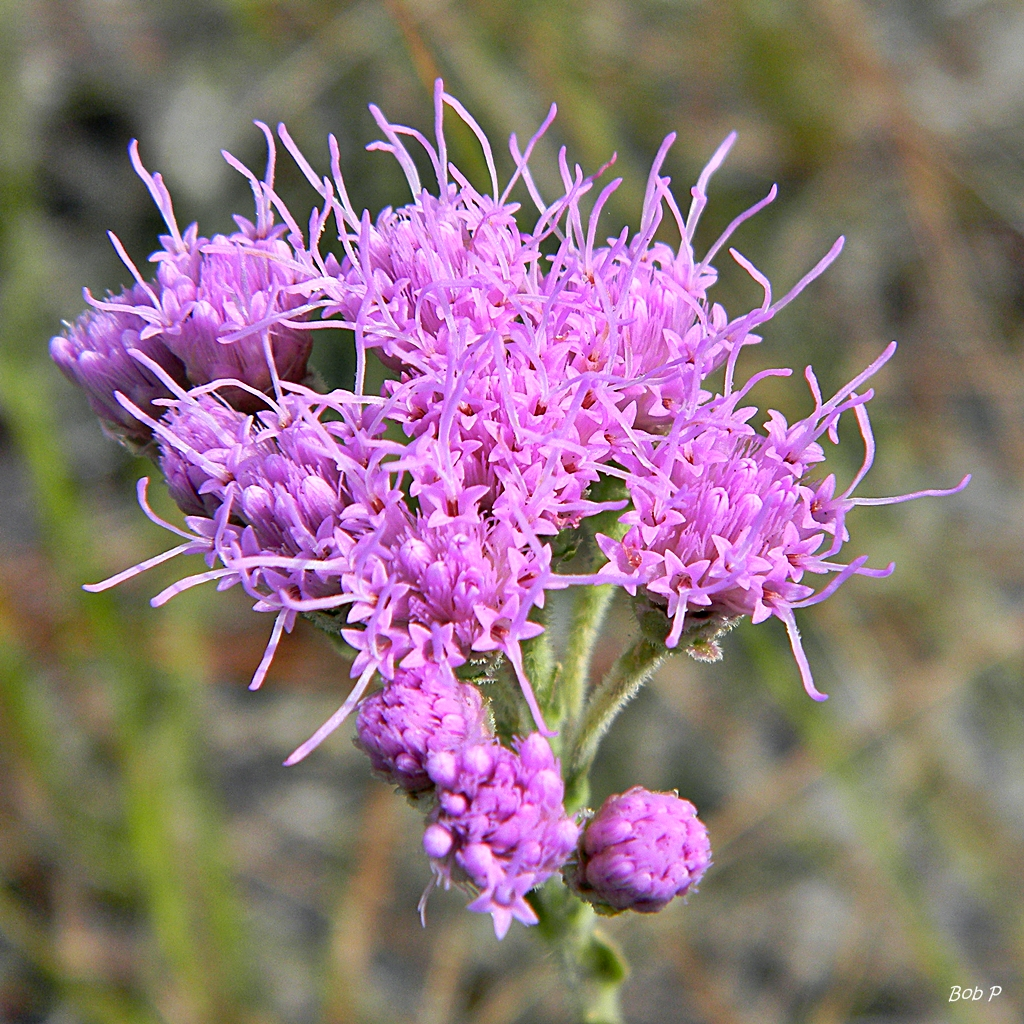
- Carphephorus corymbosus

Scientific classification
- Kingdom: Plantae
- Clade: Embryophytes
- Clade: Tracheophytes
- Clade: Angiosperms
- Clade: Eudicots
- Clade: Asterids
- Order: Asterales
- Family: Asteraceae
- Subfamily: Asteroideae
- Tribe: Eupatorieae
- Genus: Carphephorus; Cass.

Type species
- Carphephorus pseudoliatris Cass.

= Carphephorus =

Genus of flowering plants

Carphephorus is a genus of North American plants in the family Asteraceae. They are native to the southeastern United States from Louisiana to Virginia. Plants of this genus are known commonly as chaffheads.

== Description ==
These are perennial plants that grow from a caudex and fibrous root system. The stems are erect and unbranched, usually reaching 20 to 60 centimeters (8-24 inches) in height, and taller at times. The leaves are alternately arranged and point upward, sometimes pressed against the stem. The blades vary in shape and are hairy to hairless and generally glandular. The flower heads are borne in open inflorescences. Each head contains up to about 35 disc florets, usually lavender to dark magenta or pinkish purple, sometimes blue. The fruit is a ribbed, rough-textured cypsela with a pappus of bristles.

== Classification ==
Some authors separate certain species into separate genera, Trilisa and Litrisa, on the basis of certain floral characters. The species are similar enough in other aspects that other authors maintain them in Carphephorus. Molecular data may support the separation of at least some of the taxa.

Carphephorus is in the tribe Eupatorieae of the aster family. Like other members of this tribe, the flower heads have disc florets and no ray florets. It is also in the subtribe Liatrinae along with, for example, Liatris and Garberia.

Species and varieties

- Carphephorus bellidifolius – sandywoods chaffhead - Georgia South Carolina North Carolina Virginia
- Carphephorus carnosus (syn. Trilisa carnosa) – pineland chaffhead - Florida
- Carphephorus corymbosus – coastal plain chaffhead - Florida Georgia South Carolina
- Carphephorus odoratissimus (syn. Trilisa odoratissima) – vanillaleaf - Louisiana Mississippi Alabama Florida Georgia South Carolina North Carolina
  - C. odoratissimus var. odoratissimus
  - C. odoratissimus var. subtropicanus (sometimes treated as a separate species, Carphephorus subtropicanus). This species or variety is more southern than C. odoratissimus var. odoratissimus, lacks the characteristic coumarin odor of the latter, and has a different growth habit, being smaller with more of a rosette form. There is some overlap between the ranges of the two.
- Carphephorus pseudoliatris – bristleleaf chaffhead - Louisiana Mississippi Alabama Florida Georgia
- Carphephorus tomentosus – woolly chaffhead - Georgia South Carolina North Carolina Virginia

Formerly included

- Carphephorus paniculatus (syn of Trilisa paniculata ) – hairy chaffhead - Alabama Georgia Florida South Carolina North Carolina

== Biochemistry ==
A number of species contain volatile oils, giving characteristic odors.
