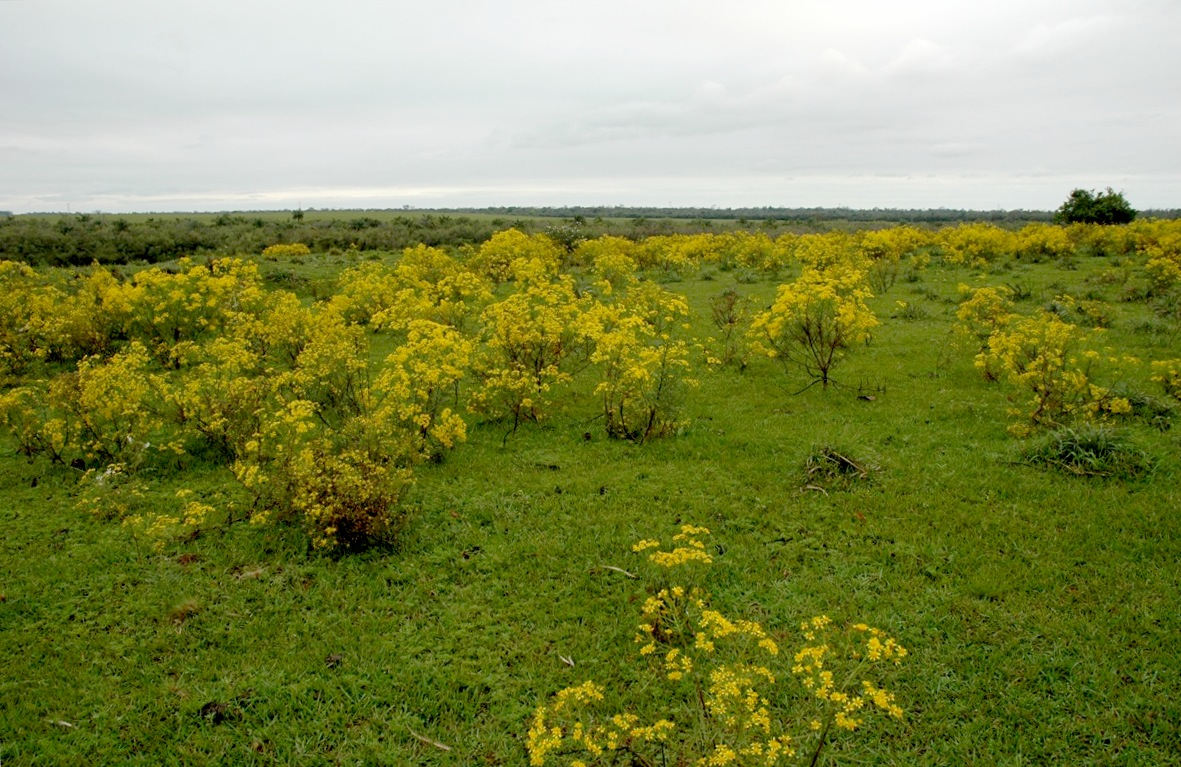
- Flor-das-almas growing in Rio Grande do Sul

Scientific classification
- Kingdom: Plantae
- Clade: Embryophytes
- Clade: Tracheophytes
- Clade: Spermatophytes
- Clade: Angiosperms
- Clade: Eudicots
- Clade: Asterids
- Order: Asterales
- Family: Asteraceae
- Genus: Senecio
- Species: S. brasiliensis

Binomial name
- Senecio brasiliensis (Spreng.) Less.
- Native range of S. brasiliensis

Synonyms
- Cineraria brasiliensis Spreng. Senecio amabilis Vell. Senecio cannabinifolius Hook.& Arn. Senecio megapotamicus H. Buek; Senecio tripartitus DC.

= Senecio brasiliensis =

Species of flowering plant in the daisy family

Senecio brasiliensis, known by the common name flor-das-almas (flower-of-souls), is a perennial species of the family Asteraceae. It is native to fields and meadows of central South America.

== Description ==
S. brasiliensis is a densely leafy perennial herb, 1 metre (3.3 ft) to 2 metres (6.6 ft) tall, with yellow flowers that prefers to make its home in degraded pasture lands and unploughed croplands in central South America.

Leaves and stems: S. brasiliensis stands very upright with a branched hairless and grooved stem. The leaves are alternate, pinnate and deeply lobed dark green on the top, whitish green on the underside. The lower part of the plant is smooth, while the upper part is hairy and the leaves cluster at the highest point with the flower stalks (corymbs).

Flowers: Yellow flowers dense on corymbs; two types of flowers (that look like [petal]s), disc florets with both male and female flowers and ray flowers which are simply female.

Seeds: Small seed with white hairs that use the wind to get around with.

== Common names ==
- English: Flower of souls, hempleaf ragwort
- Portuguese: malmequer-amarelo, Maria-mole, tasneirinha, flor-das-almas
- Guarani: Agosto poty (August flower)
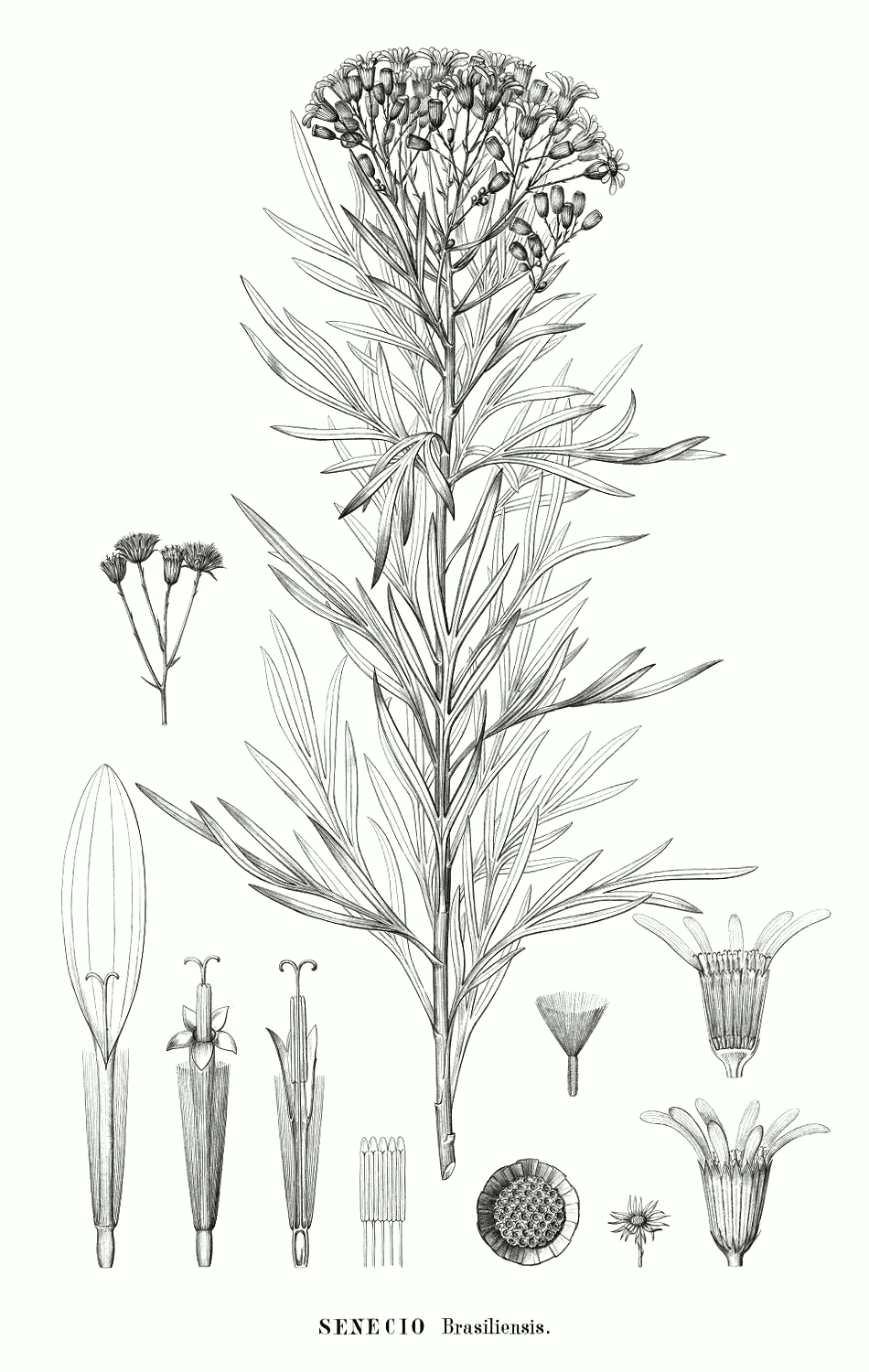

== Distribution ==
S. brasiliensis grows at elevations of 0 to 1,000 metres (3,300 ft).

Native: Argentina (mostly North Argentine Northwest and Gran Chaco), Bolivia, Brazil (mostly South Central), Paraguay, and Uruguay.

Current:

America

North America: Alabama, Florida
South America: Argentina, Bolivia, Brazil, Paraguay, Uruguay

Europe

South-West Europe: Portugal

== Predators ==
- Phaedon confinis (Chrysomelidae)
- Atarsocoris brachiariae (Hemiptera: Cydnidae) – Burrowing brown bug
