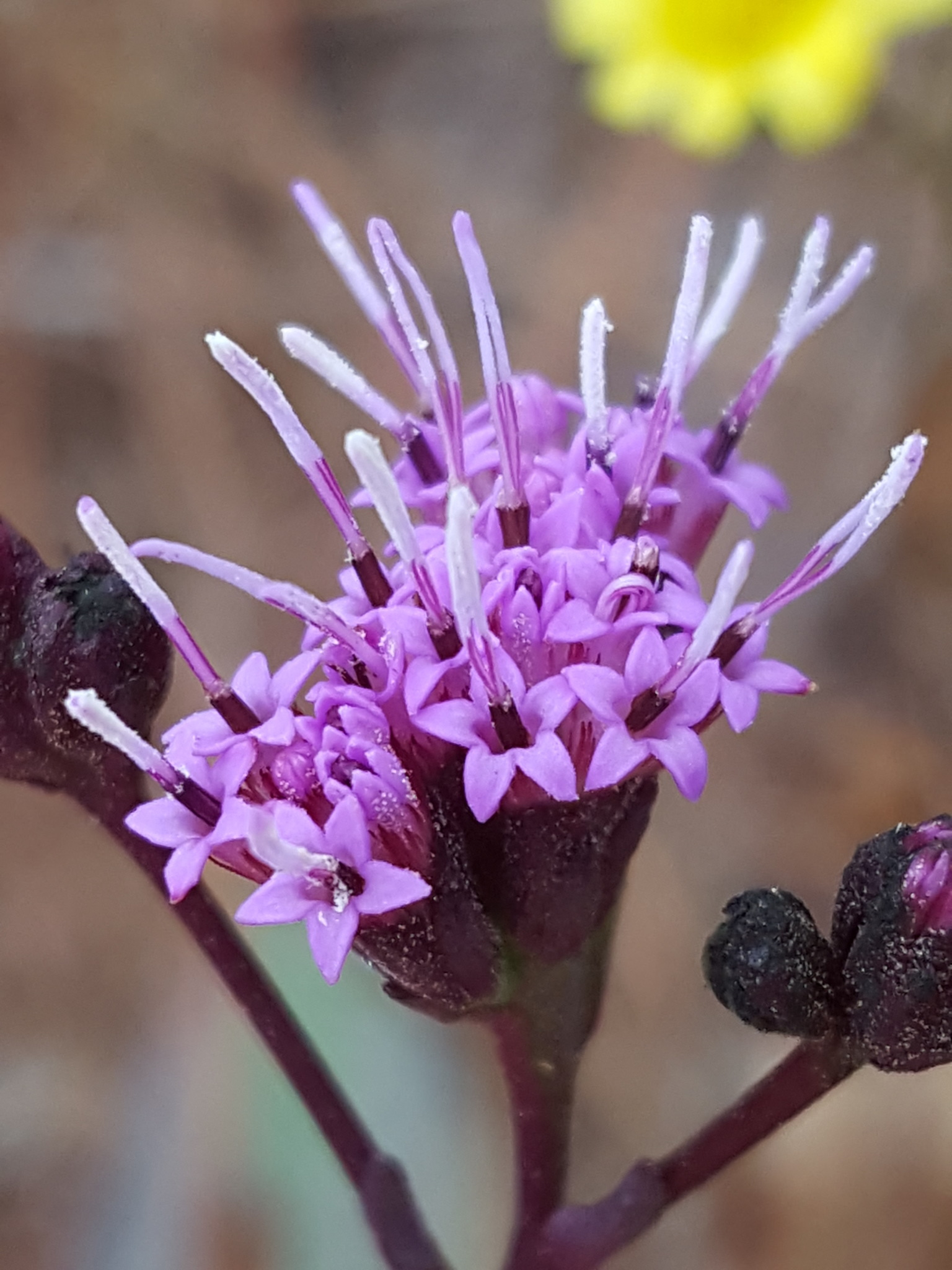

Conservation status
- Secure (NatureServe)

Scientific classification
- Kingdom: Plantae
- Clade: Tracheophytes
- Clade: Angiosperms
- Clade: Eudicots
- Clade: Asterids
- Order: Asterales
- Family: Asteraceae
- Genus: Carphephorus
- Species: C. odoratissimus

Binomial name
- Carphephorus odoratissimus (J.F.Gmel.) H.J.-C. Hebert

Synonyms
- Chrysocoma odoratissima J.F.Gmel.; Carphephorus subtropicanus DeLaney, N.Bissett & Weidenh., syn of var. subtropicanus

= Carphephorus odoratissimus =

Species of flowering plant

Carphephorus odoratissimus (syn. Trilisa odoratissima), common name vanillaleaf, is a species of North American plants in the family Asteraceae. This species is native to the southeastern United States, including the states of Georgia, North Carolina, South Carolina, Alabama, Mississippi, Louisiana, and Florida.

Carphephorus odoratissimus is a herbaceous perennial up to 180 cm (6 feet) in height, and is largely glabrous. It produces a flat-topped inflorescence with many small purplish flower heads containing disc florets but no ray florets.

Varieties

- Carphephorus odoratissimus var. odoratissimus - Georgia, North Carolina, South Carolina, Alabama, Mississippi, Louisiana, and Florida
- Carphephorus odoratissimus var. subtropicanus Wunderlin & B.F.Hansen - Central and South Florida

== Ecology ==
=== Habitat ===
C. odoratissimus primarily grows on sandy and well-drained loamy soils. It can be found in oak-pine woodlands on Ultisols, located on sand ridges within flatwoods, in moist areas, within burned upland longleaf pine-wiregrass communities, and in pine-saw palmetto woodlands.

== Uses ==
Carphephorus odoratissimus var. odoratissimus was given the common name vanillaleaf in reference to the vanilla-like odor that emanates from its foliage, which is due to the high (1.6%) content of coumarin as its major aromatic constituent. As a result, this variety has a history of use in cosmetics, herbal medicine, and as an additive to smoking tobacco. The leaves can be used to make a tonic for treating malaria.
