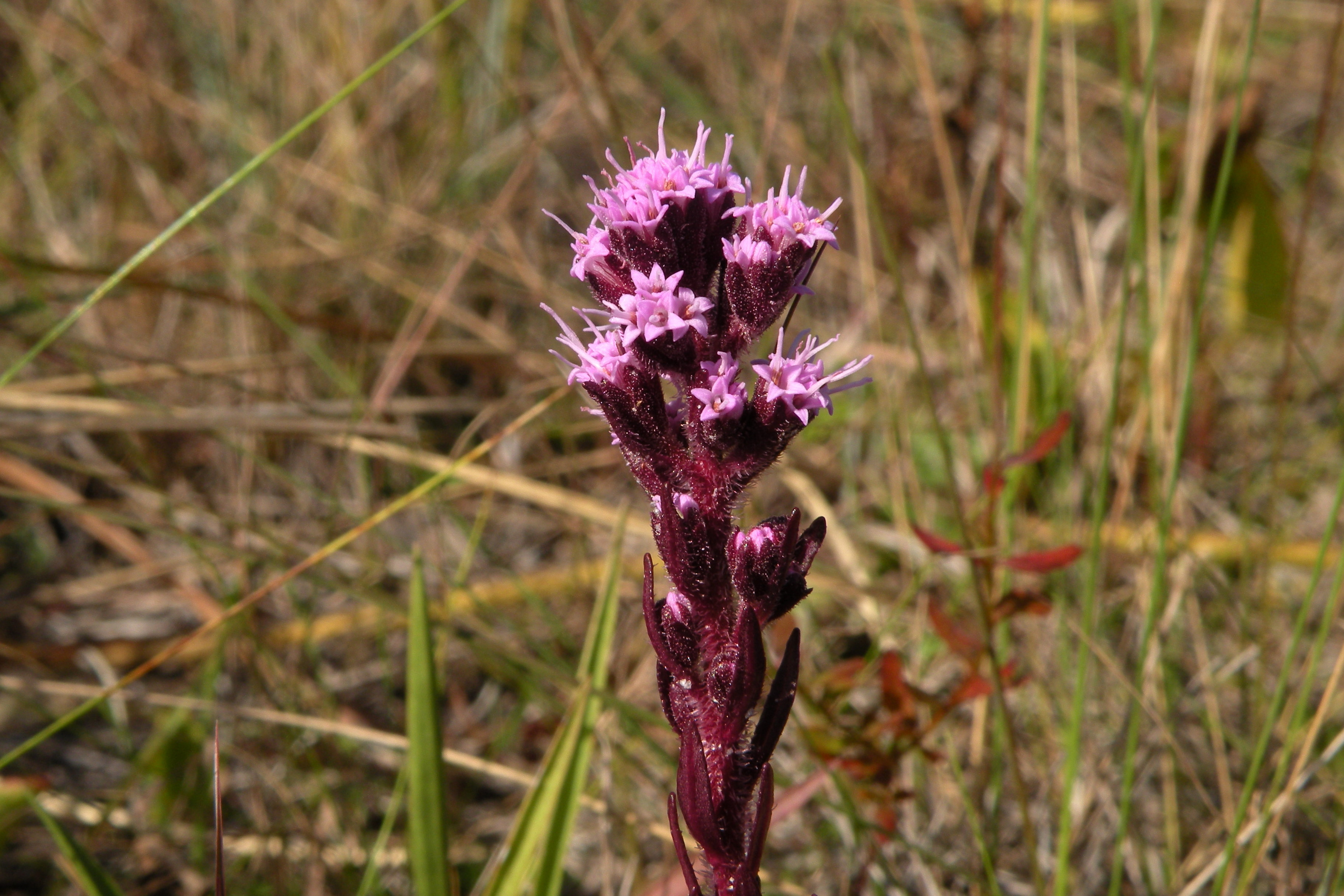
- In Apalachicola National Forest, Florida

Scientific classification
- Kingdom: Plantae
- Clade: Tracheophytes
- Clade: Angiosperms
- Clade: Eudicots
- Clade: Asterids
- Order: Asterales
- Family: Asteraceae
- Genus: Carphephorus
- Species: C. paniculatus

Binomial name
- Carphephorus paniculatus (J.Gmel.) Hebert

Synonyms
- Anonymos paniculatus Walt.; Chrysocoma paniculata (Walt.) J. Gmel.; Liatris paniculata (J. Gmel.) Michx.; Trilisa paniculata (J. Gmel.) Cass.

= Carphephorus paniculatus =

Species of flowering plant

Carphephorus paniculatus, commonly known as the hairy chaffhead, is a species of flowering plant native to parts of the southeastern United States. A perennial dicot, it reaches a height of 3 feet.
