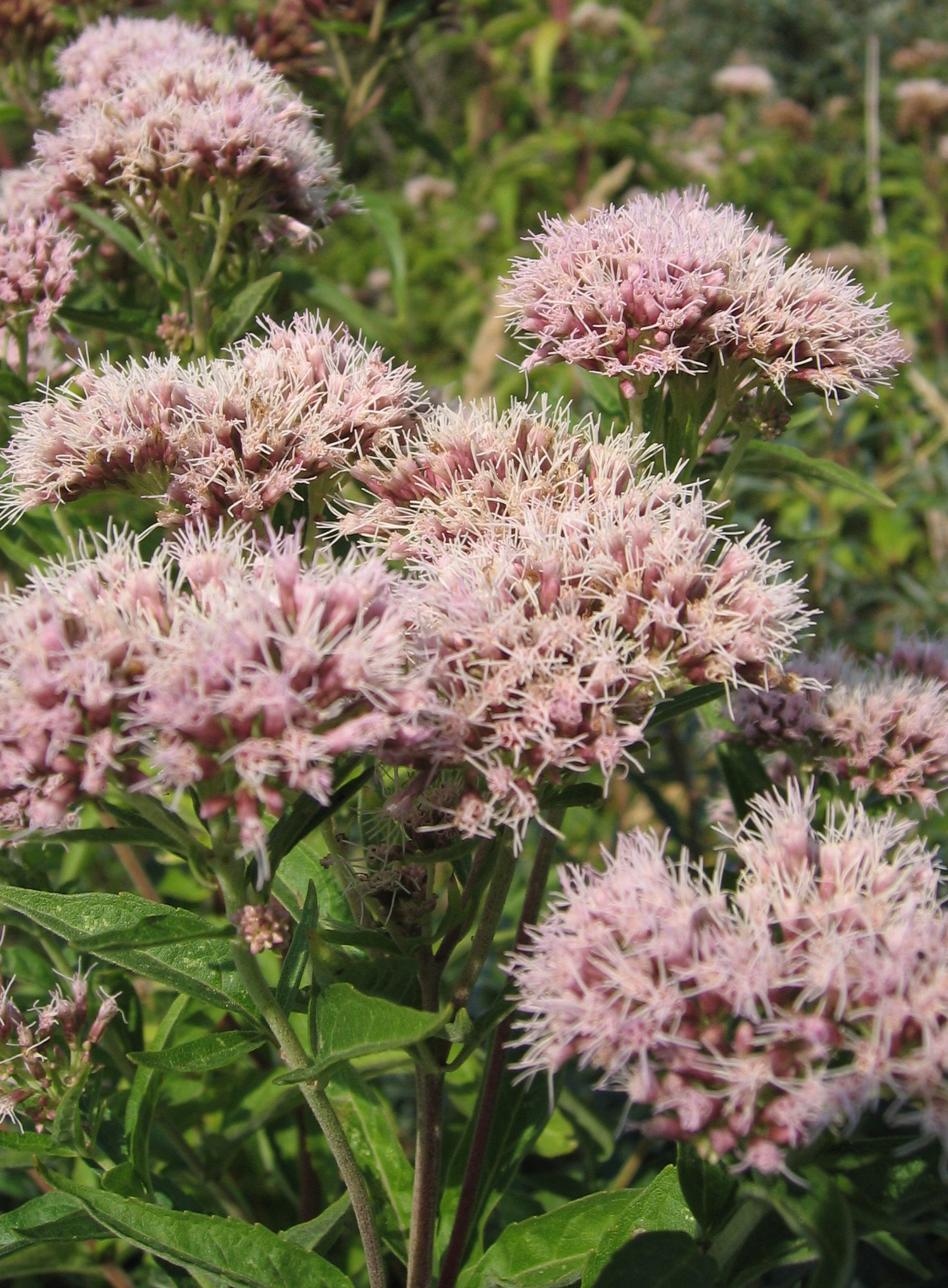
- IJmuiden, Netherlands

Scientific classification
- Kingdom: Plantae
- Clade: Tracheophytes
- Clade: Angiosperms
- Clade: Eudicots
- Clade: Asterids
- Order: Asterales
- Family: Asteraceae
- Genus: Eupatorium
- Species: E. cannabinum

Binomial name
- Eupatorium cannabinum L.

Synonyms
- Synonymy: Chrone heterophylla Dulac; Cunigunda vulgaris Bubani; Eupatorium allaisii Sennen; Eupatorium argenteum Wallich; Eupatorium birmanicum DC.; Eupatorium cannabis-folium Gilib.; Eupatorium caucasicum Steven; Eupatorium corsicum Req. ex Loisel.; Eupatorium dicline Edgew.; Eupatorium finlaysonianum Wallich ex DC.; Eupatorium heterophyllum DC.; Eupatorium hyrcanicum Steven; Eupatorium lambertianum Wallich; Eupatorium lemassonii Biau; Eupatorium lindleyanum F.Muell. 1865 not DC. 1836; Eupatorium longicaule Wallich ex DC.; Eupatorium mairei H.Lév.; Eupatorium ponticum Georgi; Eupatorium punduanum Wallichex DC.; Eupatorium simonsii C.B.Clarke; Eupatorium soleirolii Loisel.; Eupatorium suaveolens Wallich; Eupatorium trifidum Vahl; Eupatorium trifoliatum hort. dorp. ex Stev.; Eupatorium variifolium Bartl.; Eupatorium viscosum Wallich; Mikania longicaulis Wallich

= Eupatorium cannabinum =

Species of plant

Eupatorium cannabinum, commonly known as hemp-agrimony, is a herbaceous plant in the family Asteraceae. It is a robust perennial native to Europe, Northwestern Africa, Turkey, Syria, Iran, Iraq, Jordan, the Caucasus and Central Asia, and grows in damp to wet habitats (also rarely on dry soils), usually in lowlands but known up to 410 m altitude in Britain. It is cultivated as an ornamental plant and occasionally found as a garden escape in scattered locations in China, the United States and Canada. It is extremely attractive to butterflies, much like buddleia.

If the genus Eupatorium is defined in a restricted sense (about 42 species), E. cannabinum is the only species of that genus native to Europe, with the remainder in Asia or North America.

== Description ==
Eupatorium cannabinum is a perennial herb up to 1.75 metres (5.7 feet) tall forming extensive clumps, with the reddish stems covered in small hairs. The leaves are opposite, deeply 3-lobed, occasionally 5-lobed, and have serrated margins. It is dioecious, with racemes of mauve flower heads which are pollinated by insects from July to early September. The flowers are visited by many types of insects, and have a generalised pollination syndrome. The flower heads are composed of dense clusters of 2–5 mm long florets of fluffy appearance, and can be pink or purple, or rarely whitish. The fruit is an achene about 2 or 3 mm long, borne by a pappus with hairs 3 to 5 mm long, which is distributed by the wind. The plant over-winters as a hemicryptophyte.

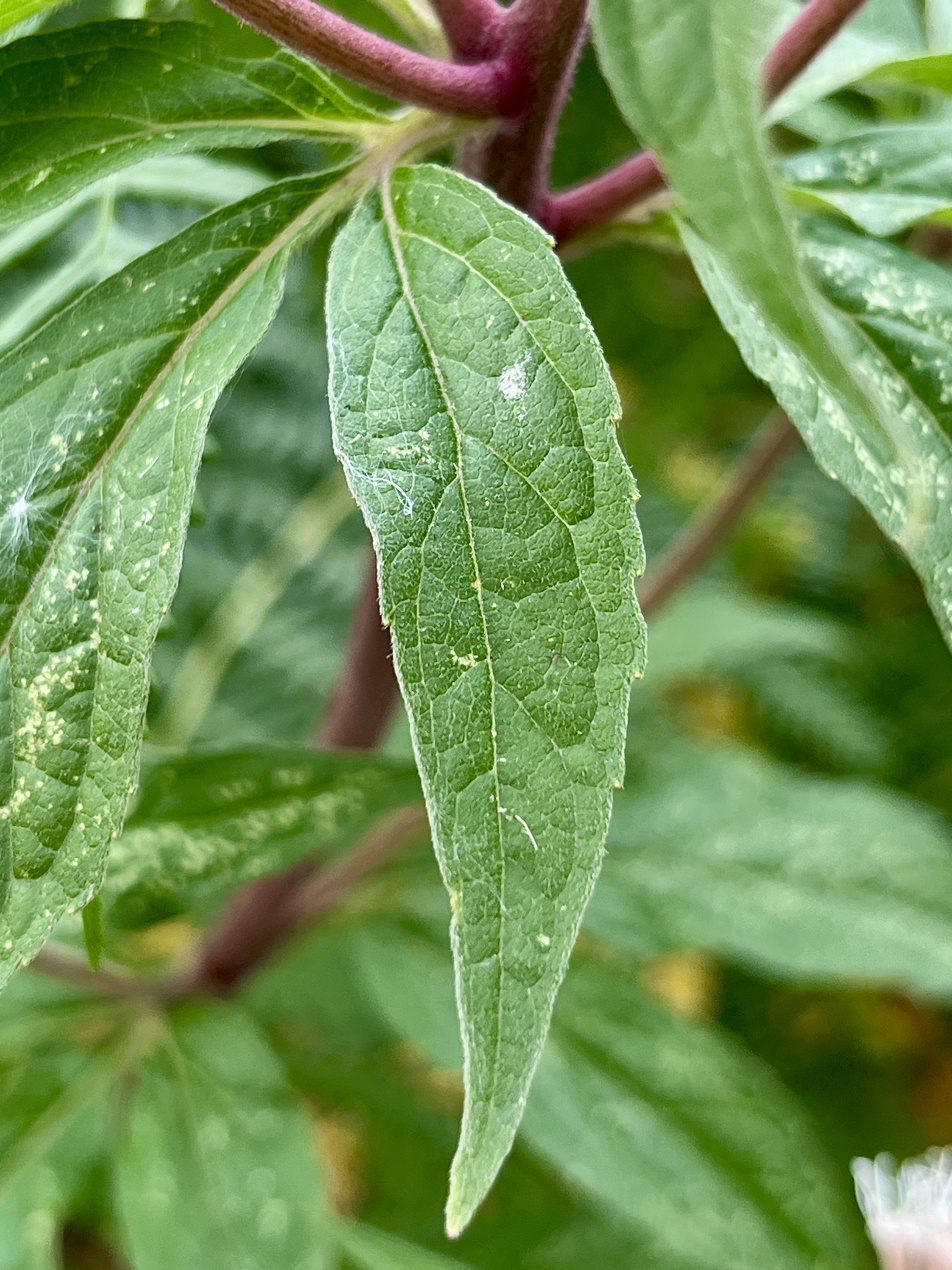
Leaf

== Taxonomy ==
Two subspecies are accepted by some authorities, but are not considered distinct by the Plants of the World Online database:

- Eupatorium cannabinum L. subsp. cannabinum - most of species range
- Eupatorium cannabinum L. subsp. corsicum (Req. ex Loisel.) P.Fourn. - Corsica, Sardinia, Basilicata, Apulia

== Toxicity ==
Eupatorium cannabinum contains tumorigenic pyrrolizidine alkaloids. The alkaloids may be present in the plant material as their N-oxides.

== Folk medicine ==
E. cannabinum, known locally by the Nepali names of Banmara and Kalijhar, is used as a styptic in the folk medicine of the Indian state of Sikkim in the Eastern Himalayas (to which the plant is not native, but an introduction).

The leaves and tender stems are crushed fresh and the juice is applied to cuts and bruises. Sometimes, when the wound is large, the squeezed remains of the plant are placed over the wound in the form of a poultice. The bleeding stops immediately and the wound is protected from infection.

== Gallery ==
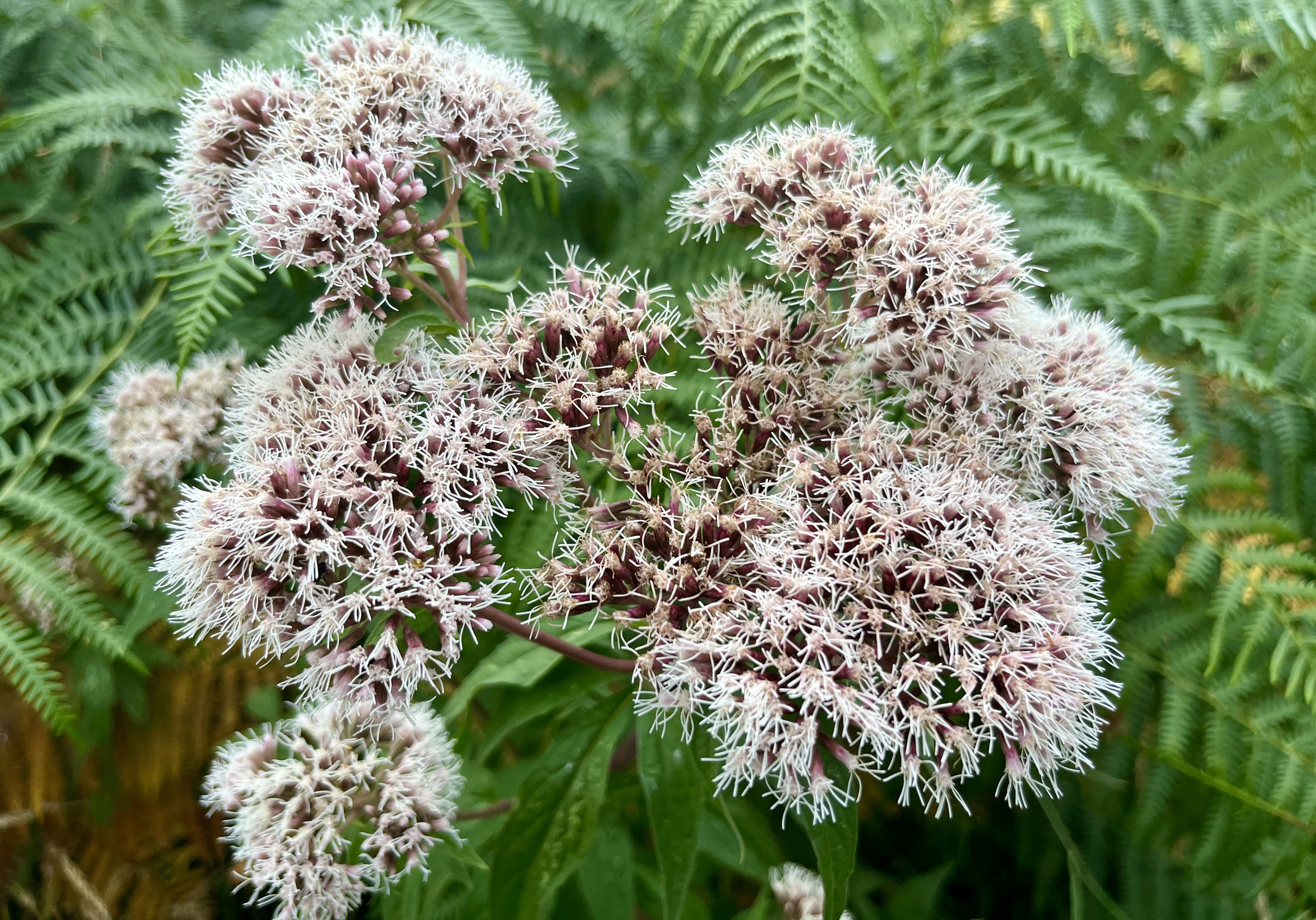
White flowers

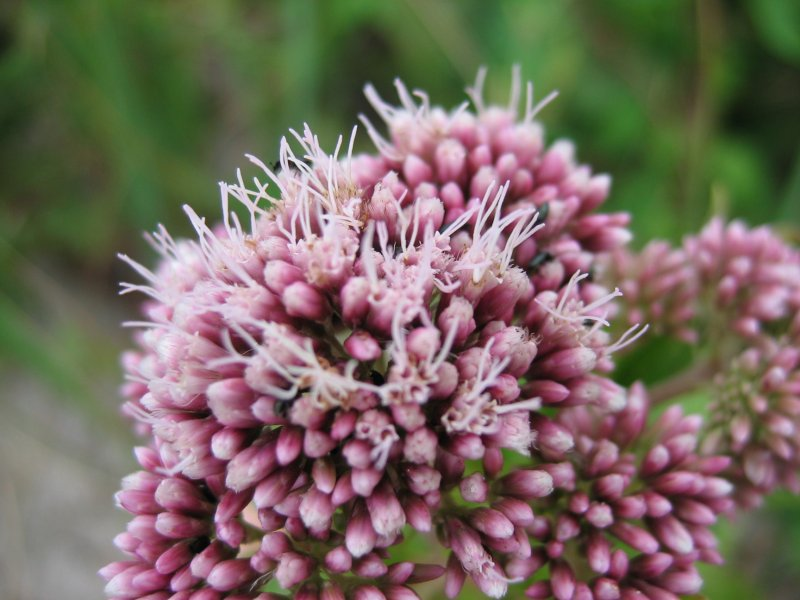

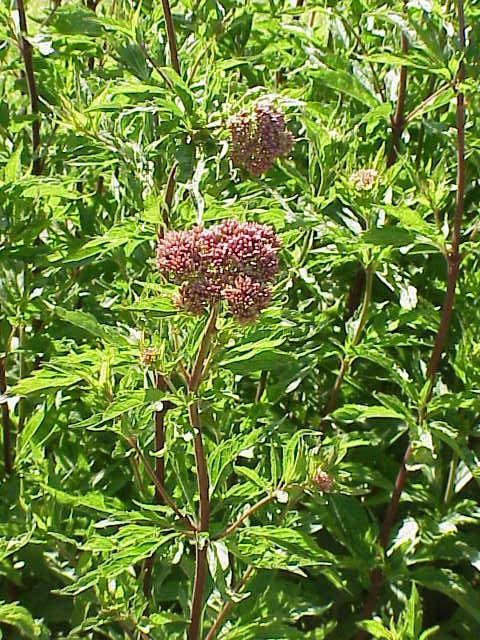

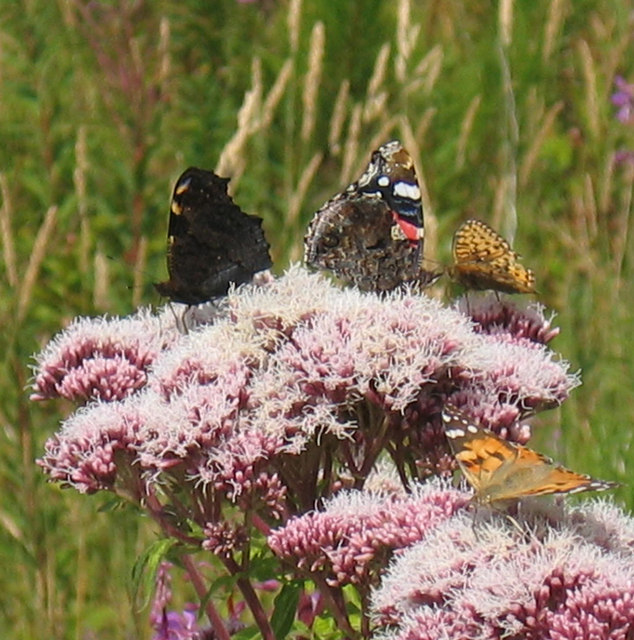

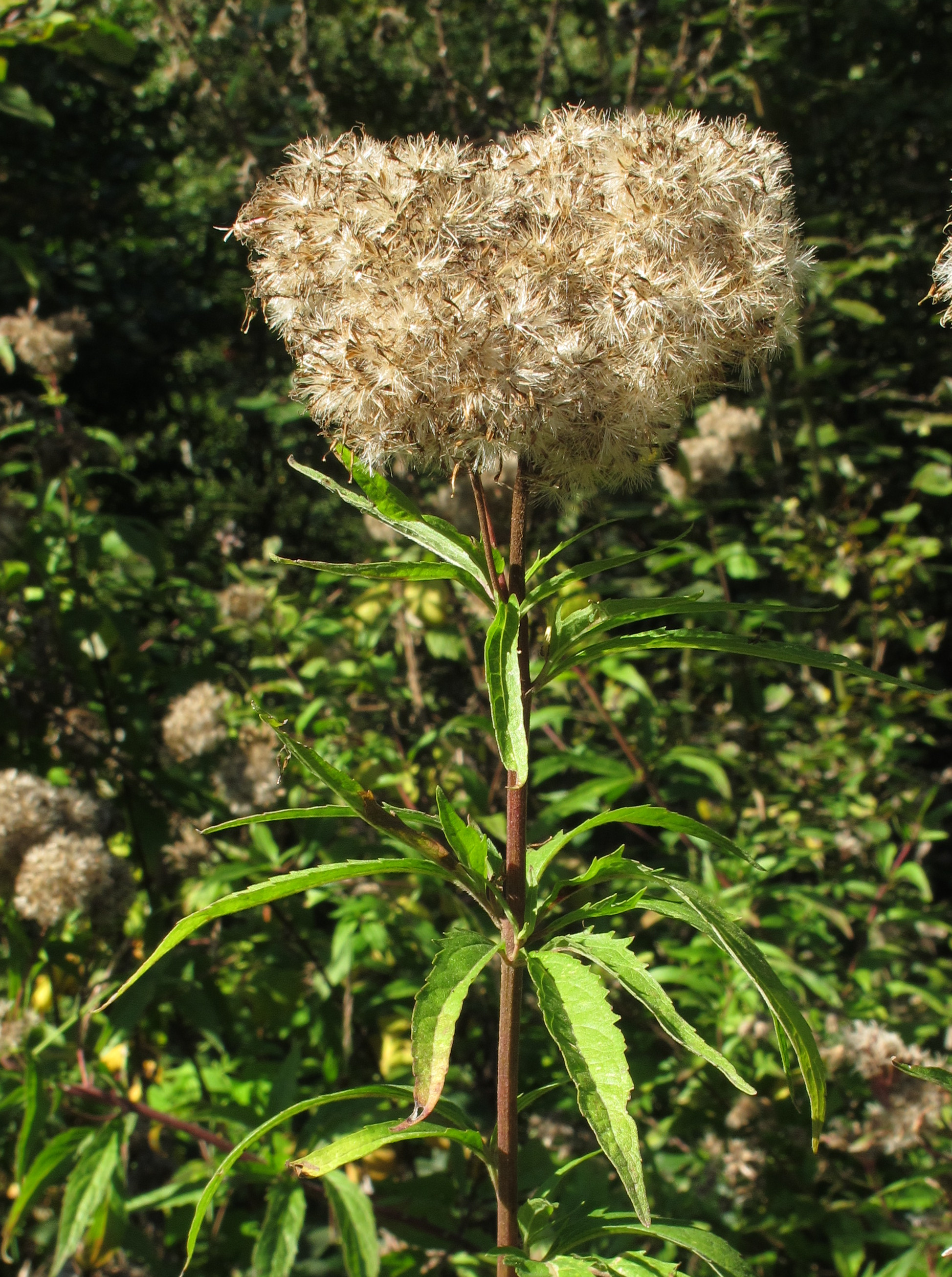

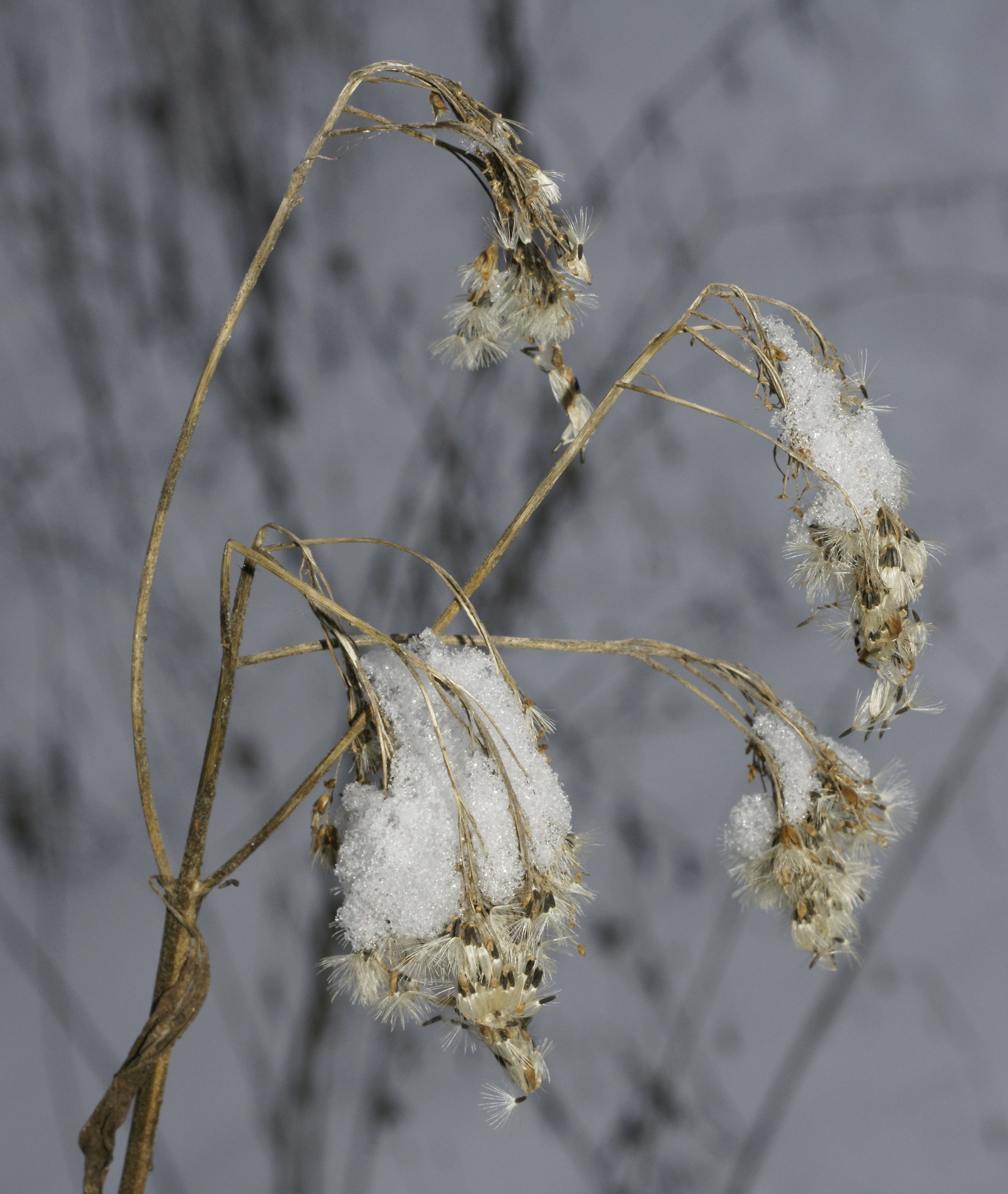
