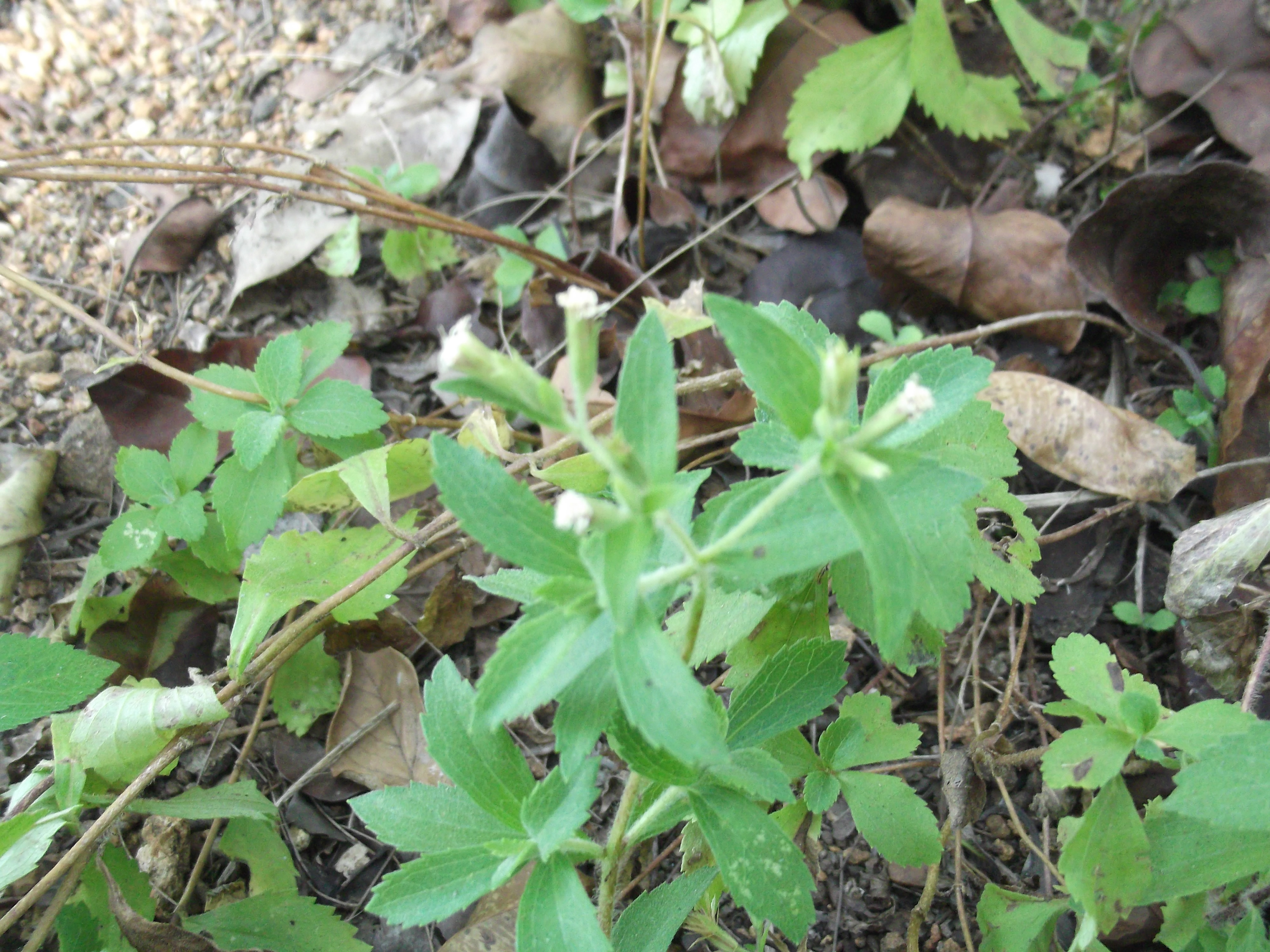
- Piqueria trinervia

Scientific classification
- Kingdom: Plantae
- Clade: Tracheophytes
- Clade: Angiosperms
- Clade: Eudicots
- Clade: Asterids
- Order: Asterales
- Family: Asteraceae
- Subfamily: Asteroideae
- Tribe: Eupatorieae
- Genus: Piqueria; Cav.

Type species
- Piqueria trinervia Cav.

= Piqueria =

Genus of flowering plants

Piqueria is a genus of Caribbean and Mesoamerican plants in the tribe Eupatorieae within the family Asteraceae.

Species

- Piqueria glandulosa B.L.Turner - Michoacán
- Piqueria hintonii R.M.King - Guerrero
- Piqueria laxiflora B.L.Rob. & Seaton - Jalisco, Durango, Michoacán, Zacatecas
- Piqueria pilosa Kunth - Michoacán, Oaxaca, México State, Hidalgo, Guanajuato, D.F., Tamaulipas, Chiapas, Tlaxcala
- Piqueria pringlei B.L.Rob. & Seaton - México State
- Piqueria serrata A.Gray - San Luis Potosí, Jalisco, México State
- Piqueria triflora Hemsl. - Durango, Guerrero, Sinaloa, Michoacán, Nayarit, Jalisco
- Piqueria trinervia Cav. - from Tamaulipas to Panama, also Hispaniola

formerly included

Several dozen species once included in Piqueria but now considered better suited to other genera: Acritopappus Ageratum Alomia Clibadium Ellenbergia Erythradenia Gardnerina Guevaria Gymnocoronis Koanophyllon Ophryosporus Phalacraea Richterago Teixeiranthus Trichogonia
