= Goatweed =

Goatweed may refer to:

== Plants ==
- Ageratum, a genus of plants in the family Asteraceae, particularly:
  - Ageratum conyzoides a weed or garden flower
  - Ageratum houstonianum a popular garden flower and sometimes a weed, blue billy goat weed
- Capraria biflora, a species of plant in the family Scrophulariaceae
- Croton (plant), a genus of plants in the family Euphorbiaceae
- Hypericum perforatum, a species of plant in the family Hypericaceae
- Hypericum erectum, a species of plant in the family Hypericaceae

== Other ==
- Anaea andria, a species of butterfly

== See also ==
- Horny goat weed
