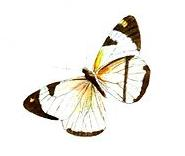

Scientific classification
- Kingdom: Animalia
- Phylum: Arthropoda
- Class: Insecta
- Order: Lepidoptera
- Family: Pieridae
- Genus: Melete
- Species: M. salacia

Binomial name
- Melete salacia (Godart, 1819)

Synonyms
- Pieris salacia Godart, 1819; Pieris vecticlusa Butler, 1865

= Melete salacia =

Species of butterfly

Melete salacia is a butterfly in the family Pieridae. It is found on Hispaniola and Cuba in the Caribbean. The habitat consists of mesic hardwood forests.

== Description ==
The length of the forewings is 22–29 mm (0.87–1.14 in) for males and 23–26 mm (0.91–1.02 in) for females.

== Diet ==
Adults feed on flower nectar of a variety of flowers, including Asclepias, Palicourea barbinervia, Cordia globosa, Lantana ovatifolia, Morinda citrifolia, Tournefortia hirsutissima, Ageratum conyzoides, Coffea arabica and Croton barahonensis.

== Subspecies ==
The following subspecies are recognised:

- Melete salacia salacia (Mexico)
- Melete salacia cubana Fruhstorfer, 1908 (Hispaniola, Cuba)
