= Phalacraea =

Scientific classification
- Kingdom: Plantae
- Clade: Embryophytes
- Clade: Tracheophytes
- Clade: Spermatophytes
- Clade: Angiosperms
- Clade: Eudicots
- Clade: Asterids
- Order: Asterales
- Family: Asteraceae
- Subfamily: Asteroideae
- Tribe: Eupatorieae
- Genus: Phalacraea; DC.

Type species
- Phalacraea latifolia DC.

Synonyms
- Steleocodon Gilli

Genus of flowering plants

Phalacraea is a genus of South American plants in the tribe Eupatorieae within the family Asteraceae.

Species

- Phalacraea callitricha (B.L.Rob.) R.M.King & H.Rob. - Colombia, Ecuador
- Phalacraea ecuadorensis R.M.King & H.Rob. - Ecuador
- Phalacraea latifolia DC. - Peru
- Phalacraea longipetiolata (B.L.Rob.) R.M.King & H.Rob. - Colombia, Ecuador (=Steleocodon gracilis Gilli)

formerly included

see Ageratum Alomia

- Phalacraea coelestina Regel - Ageratum microcarpum (Benth. ex Oersted) Hemsley
- Phalacraea lindenii Sch.Bip. ex Benth. & Hook.f. - Alomia ageratoides Kunth
- Phalacraea wendlandii Sch.Bip. ex Klatt - Ageratum rugosum Coulter ex J. D. Smith
