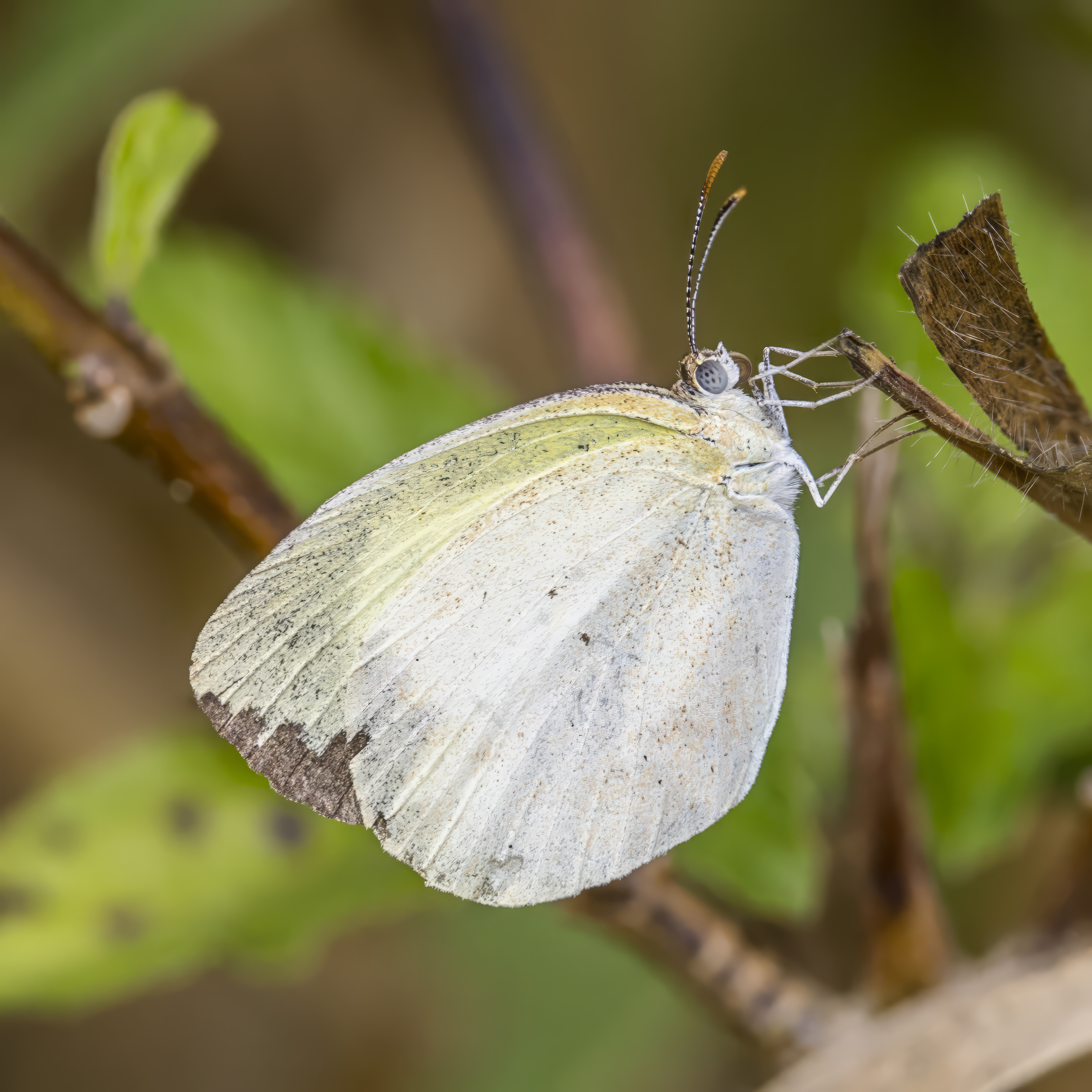
- P. l. athalia, Colombia

Scientific classification
- Kingdom: Animalia
- Phylum: Arthropoda
- Class: Insecta
- Order: Lepidoptera
- Family: Pieridae
- Genus: Eurema
- Species: E. leuce

Binomial name
- Eurema leuce (Boisduval, 1836)

Synonyms
- Terias leuce Boisduval, 1836; Pyrisitia leuce; Papilio sanguinea Larrañaga, 1923; Terias riograndensis d'Almeida, 1934; Terias circumcincta Bates, 1861; Terias athalia C. & R. Felder, [1865]; Terias diodina Butler, 1875; Terias pseudoleuce d'Almeida, 1934; Eurema hahneli Staudinger, 1884; Eurema sanjuanensis Watson, 1938

= Eurema leuce =

Hall's sulphur

Species of butterfly

Eurema leuce, the Hall's sulphur, is a butterfly in the family Pieridae. It is found on the West Indies and in Brazil, Uruguay, Colombia, and Venezuela.

The length of the forewings is 17–21 mm for males and females. Adults have been recorded feeding on Bidens pilosa, Tournefortia hirsutissima, and Croton barahonensis.

== Subspecies ==
The following subspecies are recognised:

- E. l. leuce (Brazil: Rio Grande do Sul, Uruguay)
- E. l. circumcincta (Bates, 1861) (Brazil: Pará)
- E. l. athalia (C. & R. Felder, [1865]) (Colombia, Venezuela, Trinidad)
- E. l. flavilla (Bates, 1861) (Brazil: Amazonas), Peru)
- E. l. memulus (Butler, 1871) (Haiti)
- E. l. antillarum (Hall, 1936) (St. Kitts, Dominica, St. Lucia, Puerto Rico)
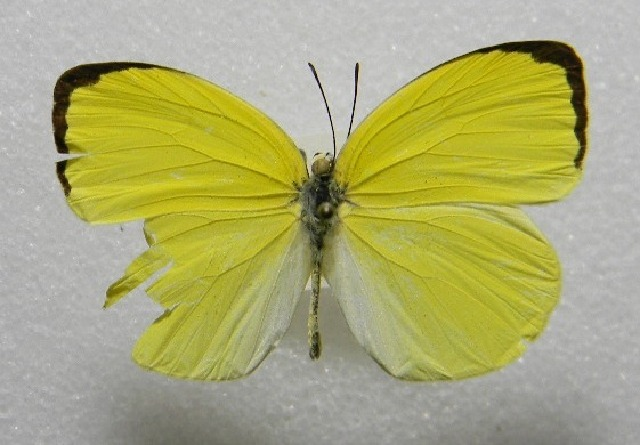
Male. ventral view

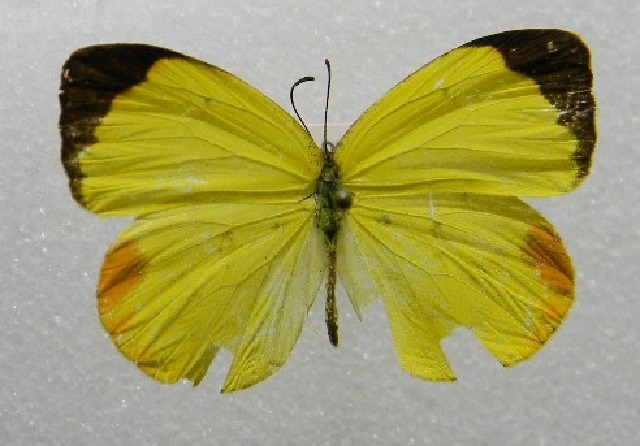
Female, dorsal view

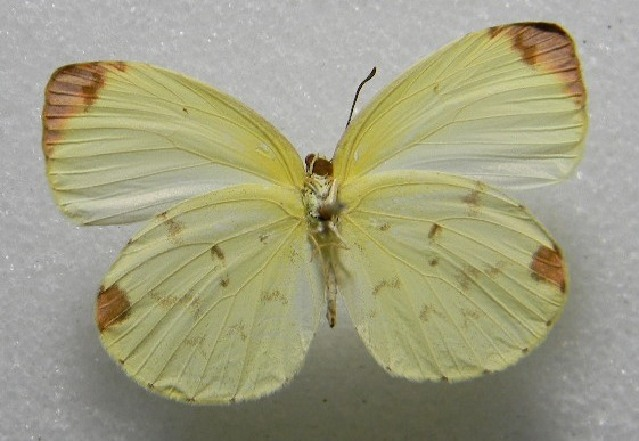
Female, ventral view
