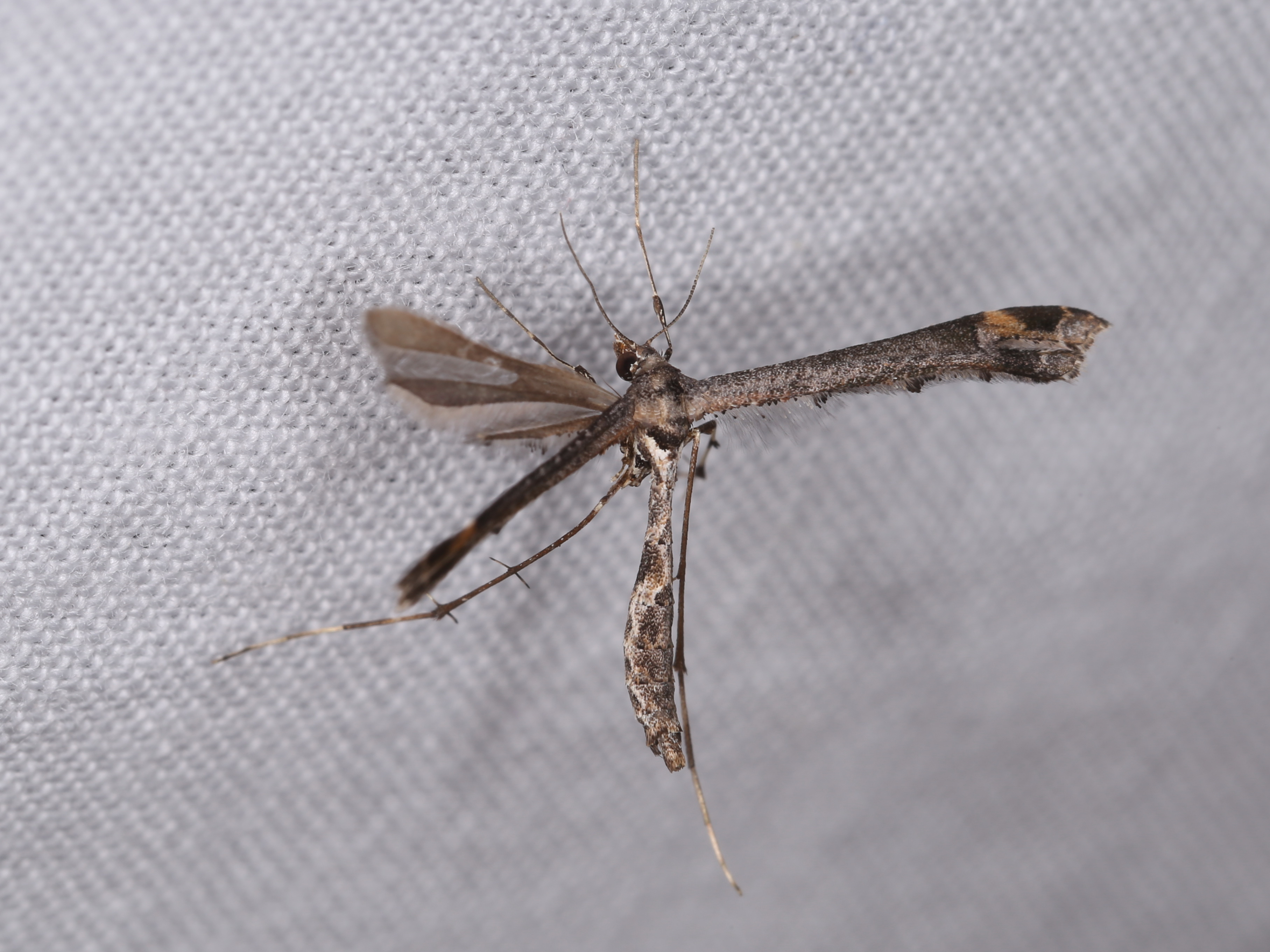

Scientific classification
- Domain: Eukaryota
- Kingdom: Animalia
- Phylum: Arthropoda
- Class: Insecta
- Order: Lepidoptera
- Family: Pterophoridae
- Genus: Anstenoptilia
- Species: A. marmarodactyla

Binomial name
- Anstenoptilia marmarodactyla (Dyar, 1902)

Synonyms
- Anstenoptilia marmorodactyla; Platyptilia marmarodactyla Dyar, 1902; Platyptilia pasadenensis Grinnell, 1908

= Anstenoptilia marmarodactyla =

Species of plume moth

Anstenoptilia marmarodactyla is a moth of the family Pterophoridae. It is native to California and Arizona, south through Mexico to Costa Rica. It is an introduced species in Hawaii.

Harrison Gray Dyar Jr. described the species in 1902 as Platyptilia marmarodactyla. In 1958, Zimmerman moved the species to a new genus, Anstenoptilia, but (mis-)spelled the epithet: Anstenoptilia marmorodactyla. The misspelling has been reused in several subsequent publications.

The wingspan is 16–18 mm. Adults are on wing in May and September in Central America and from July to November in the Nearctic realm.

The larvae feed on Ageratum, Salvia, Agastache, Mentha, Pycnanthemum, Monardella, Scrophularia and Lantana species.
