= Fleischmannia obscurifolia =

Conservation status
- Least Concern (IUCN 3.1)

Scientific classification
- Kingdom: Plantae
- Clade: Tracheophytes
- Clade: Angiosperms
- Clade: Eudicots
- Clade: Asterids
- Order: Asterales
- Family: Asteraceae
- Genus: Fleischmannia
- Species: F. obscurifolia

Binomial name
- Fleischmannia obscurifolia (Hieron.) R.M.King & H.Rob.

Synonyms
- Eupatorium obscurifolium Hieron.; Eupatorium aequinoctiale B.L.Rob.; Eupatorium huigrense B.L.Rob.; Fleischmannia aequinoctialis (B.L.Rob.) R.M.King & H.Rob.; Fleischmannia huigrensis (B.L.Rob.) R.M.King & H.Rob.

Species of flowering plant

Fleischmannia obscurifolia is a species of flowering plant in the family Asteraceae. It is found in Ecuador and Colombia. Its natural habitats are subtropical or tropical moist lowland forests and subtropical or tropical moist montane forests. It is threatened by habitat loss.

The species was first described as Eupatorium obscurifolium by Georg Hans Emmo Wolfgang Hieronymus in 1900. In 1970 Robert Merrill King and Harold Ernest Robinson placed the species in genus Fleischmannia as F. obscurifolia.
