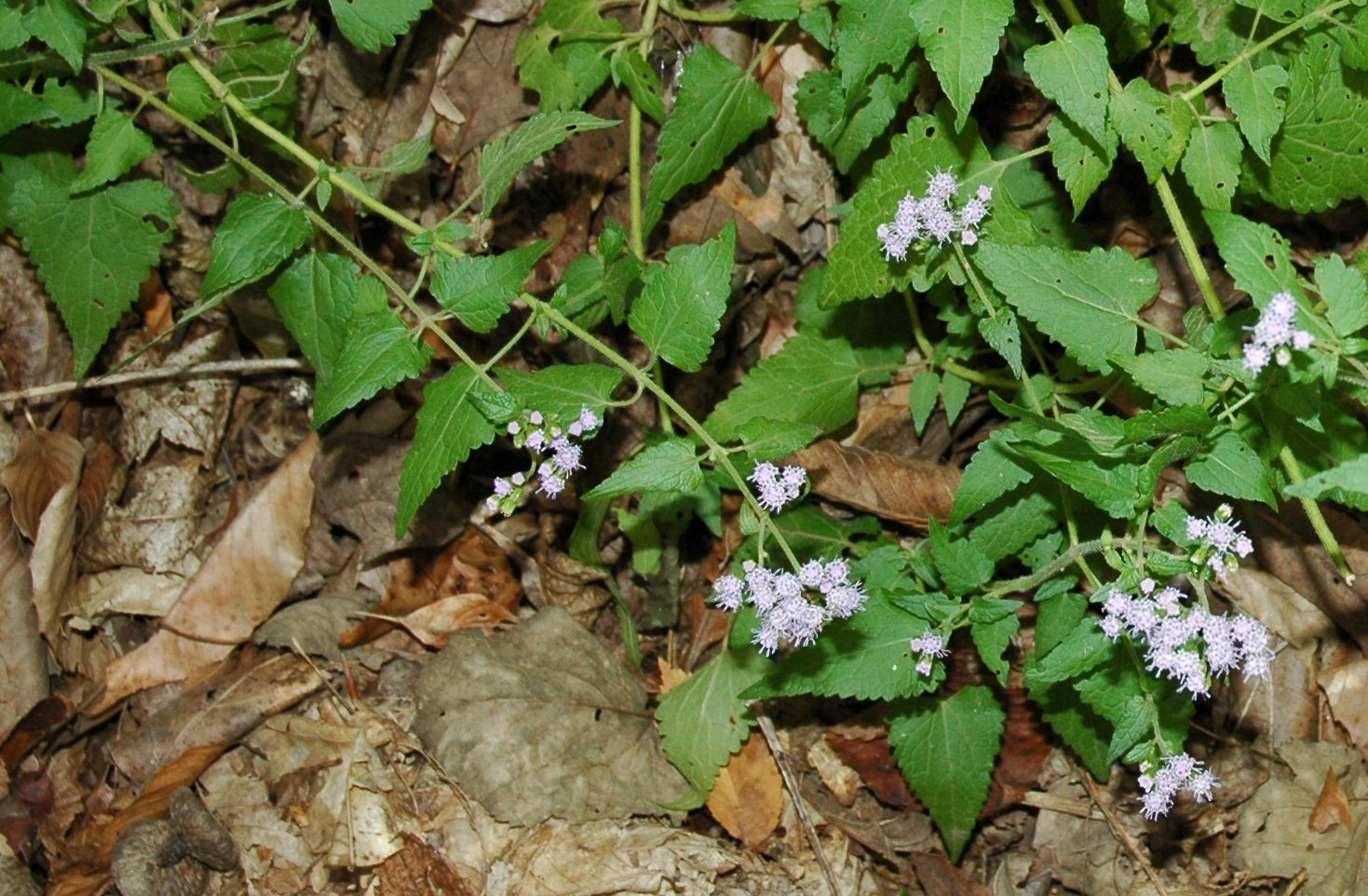
- Fleischmannia incarnata

Scientific classification
- Kingdom: Plantae
- Clade: Embryophytes
- Clade: Tracheophytes
- Clade: Spermatophytes
- Clade: Angiosperms
- Clade: Eudicots
- Clade: Asterids
- Order: Asterales
- Family: Asteraceae
- Subfamily: Asteroideae
- Tribe: Eupatorieae
- Genus: Fleischmannia; Sch.Bip.

Synonyms
- Eupatorium sect. Microstemon Cabrera

= Fleischmannia =

Genus of flowering plants

Fleischmannia is a genus of flowering plant in the family Asteraceae. The name honours Gottfried F. Fleischmann (1777–1850), the teacher of Carl Heinrich Schultz at University of Erlangen–Nuremberg. Members of the genus are native to South, Central, and North America, with some species found as far north as Virginia and Illinois. They are commonly known as thoroughworts.

Fleischmannia is in the tribe Eupatorieae and as such has flower heads with disc florets and no ray florets. Within that tribe it is most closely related to Conoclinium and Ageratum.

Fleischmannia species were traditionally included as part of the large Eupatorium, recognized in the broad sense based on achenes with five ribs and a pappus of capillary bristles. Fleischmannia is distinguished morphologically by having the inner surface of the corolla lobes markedly papillate (requires magnification to see), the carpopodia symmetrical and stopper-shaped, and the involucres small and with 3 series of subimbricate bracts. The number of flowers per head is typically 20 or more (up to 50). Many species are herbs and somewhat weedy, and have leaves with long petioles. Although the base chromosome number for the genus is x=10, one species, F. microstemon, is notable for have a chromosome number of x=4, the lowest in tribe Eupatorieae. A thorough study of Fleischmannia is needed to determine if all of its species are actually distinct and worthy of recognition.

Species

- Fleischmannia allenii R.M.King & H.Rob.
- Fleischmannia altihuanucana H.Rob.
- Fleischmannia anisopoda (B.L.Rob.) R.M.King & H.Rob.
- Fleischmannia anomalochaeta R.M.King & H.Rob.
- Fleischmannia antiquorum (Standl. & Steyerm.) R.M.King & H.Rob.
- Fleischmannia arguta (Kunth) B.L.Rob.
- Fleischmannia bergantinensis (V.M.Badillo) R.M.King & H.Rob.
- Fleischmannia blakei (B.L.Rob.) R.M.King & H.Rob.
- Fleischmannia bohlmanniana R.M.King & H.Rob.
- Fleischmannia bridgesii (B.L.Rob.) R.M.King & H.Rob.
- Fleischmannia cajamarcensis H.Rob.
- Fleischmannia capillipes (Benth. ex Oerst.) R.M.King & H.Rob.
- Fleischmannia carletonii (B.L.Rob.) R.M.King & H.Rob.
- Fleischmannia ceronii H.Rob.
- Fleischmannia chiriquensis R.M.King & H.Rob.
- Fleischmannia ciliolifera R.M.King & H.Rob.
- Fleischmannia coibensis S.Díaz
- Fleischmannia cookii (B.L.Rob.) R.M.King & H.Rob.
- Fleischmannia crocodilia (Standl. & Steyerm.) R.M.King & H.Rob.
- Fleischmannia cuatrecasasii R.M.King & H.Rob.
- Fleischmannia davidsmithii H.Rob.
- Fleischmannia deborabellae R.M.King & H.Rob.
- Fleischmannia dissolvens (Baker) R.M.King & H.Rob.
- Fleischmannia diversifolia (Schrad.) H.Rob.
- Fleischmannia dodsonii H.Rob.
- Fleischmannia ejidensis (V.M.Badillo) R.M.King & H.Rob.
- Fleischmannia ferreyrae R.M.King & H.Rob.
- Fleischmannia ferreyrii R.M.King & H.Rob.
- Fleischmannia fragilis (B.L.Rob.) R.M.King & H.Rob.
- Fleischmannia gentryi R.M.King & H.Rob.
- Fleischmannia gonzalezii (B.L.Rob.) R.M.King & H.Rob.
- Fleischmannia granatensis R.M.King & H.Rob.
- Fleischmannia guatemalensis R.M.King & H.Rob.
- Fleischmannia hammellii H.Rob.
- Fleischmannia harlingii R.M.King & H.Rob.
- Fleischmannia haughtii R.M.King & H.Rob.
- Fleischmannia hemonophylla
- Fleischmannia holwayana (B.L.Rob.) R.M.King & H.Rob.
- Fleischmannia huigrensis (B.L.Rob.) R.M.King & H.Rob.
- Fleischmannia hymenophylla (Klatt) R.M.King & H.Rob.
- Fleischmannia ignota (V.M.Badillo) R.M.King & H.Rob.
- Fleischmannia imitans (B.L.Rob.) R.M.King & H.Rob.
- Fleischmannia incarnata (Walter) R.M.King & H.Rob.
- Fleischmannia killipii H.Rob.
- Fleischmannia kingii H.Rob.
- Fleischmannia klattiana (Hieron.) R.M.King & H.Rob.
- Fleischmannia laxa (Gardner) R.M.King & H.Rob.
- Fleischmannia laxicephala (Cabrera) R.M.King & H.Rob.
- Fleischmannia lellingeri R.M.King & H.Rob.
- Fleischmannia lithophila (B.L.Rob.) R.M.King & H.Rob.
- Fleischmannia lloensis (Hieron.) R.M.King & H.Rob.
- Fleischmannia loxensis H.Rob.
- Fleischmannia magdalenensis (B.L.Rob.) R.M.King & H.Rob.
- Fleischmannia marginata (Poepp. & Endl.) R.M.King & H.Rob.
- Fleischmannia matudae R.M.King & H.Rob.
- Fleischmannia mayorii (B.L.Rob.) R.M.King & H.Rob.
- Fleischmannia mercedensis (B.L.Rob.) R.M.King & H.Rob.
- Fleischmannia microstemoides H.Rob.
- Fleischmannia microstemon (Cass.) R.M.King & H.Rob.
- Fleischmannia misera (B.L.Rob.) R.M.King & H.Rob.
- Fleischmannia monagasensis (V.M.Badillo) R.M.King & H.Rob.
- Fleischmannia multinervis (Benth.) R.M.King & H.Rob.
- Fleischmannia narinoensis H.Rob.
- Fleischmannia nix R.M.King & H.Rob.
- Fleischmannia obscurifolia (Hieron.) R.M.King & H.Rob.
- Fleischmannia pastazae (B.L.Rob.) R.M.King & H.Rob.
- Fleischmannia patens (Klatt) R.M.King & H.Rob.
- Fleischmannia pennellii (B.L.Rob.) R.M.King & H.Rob.
- Fleischmannia petiolata H.Rob.
- Fleischmannia plectranthifolia (Benth. ex Oerst.) R.M.King & H.Rob.
- Fleischmannia polopolensis (B.L.Rob.) R.M.King & H.Rob.
- Fleischmannia porphyranthema (A.Gray) R.M.King & H.Rob.
- Fleischmannia pratensis (Klatt) R.M.King & H.Rob.
- Fleischmannia purpusii R.M.King & H.Rob.
- Fleischmannia pycnocephala (Less.) R.M.King & H.Rob.
- Fleischmannia pycnocephaloides (B.L.Rob.) R.M.King & H.Rob.
- Fleischmannia quirozii H.Rob.
- Fleischmannia remotifolia (DC.) R.M.King & H.Rob.
- Fleischmannia rhodotephra (B.L.Rob.) R.M.King & H.Rob.
- Fleischmannia rivulorum (B.L.Rob.) R.M.King & H.Rob.
- Fleischmannia sagasteguii H.Rob.
- Fleischmannia salina B.L.Turner
- Fleischmannia saxorum (Standl. & Steyerm.) R.M.King & H.Rob.
- Fleischmannia schickendantzii (Hieron.) R.M.King & H.Rob.
- Fleischmannia seleriana (B.L.Rob.) R.M.King & H.Rob.
- Fleischmannia sideritides (Benth. ex Benth.) R.M.King & H.Rob.
- Fleischmannia sinaloensis (B.L.Rob.) R.M.King & H.Rob.
- Fleischmannia sinclairii (Benth. ex Oerst.) R.M.King & H.Rob.
- Fleischmannia sonorae (A.Gray) R.M.King & H.Rob.
- Fleischmannia soratae (Sch.Bip. ex B.L.Rob.) R.M.King & H.Rob.
- Fleischmannia splendens R.M.King & H.Rob.
- Fleischmannia steyermarkii R.M.King & H.Rob.
- Fleischmannia tamboensis (Hieron.) R.M.King & H.Rob.
- Fleischmannia trinervia (Sch.Bip.) R.M.King & H.Rob.
- Fleischmannia tysonii R.M.King & H.Rob.
- Fleischmannia vargasii H.Rob.
- Fleischmannia viscidipes (B.L.Rob.) R.M.King & H.Rob.
- Fleischmannia yungasensis (B.L.Rob.) R.M.King & H.Rob.
- Fleischmannia zakii H.Rob.
