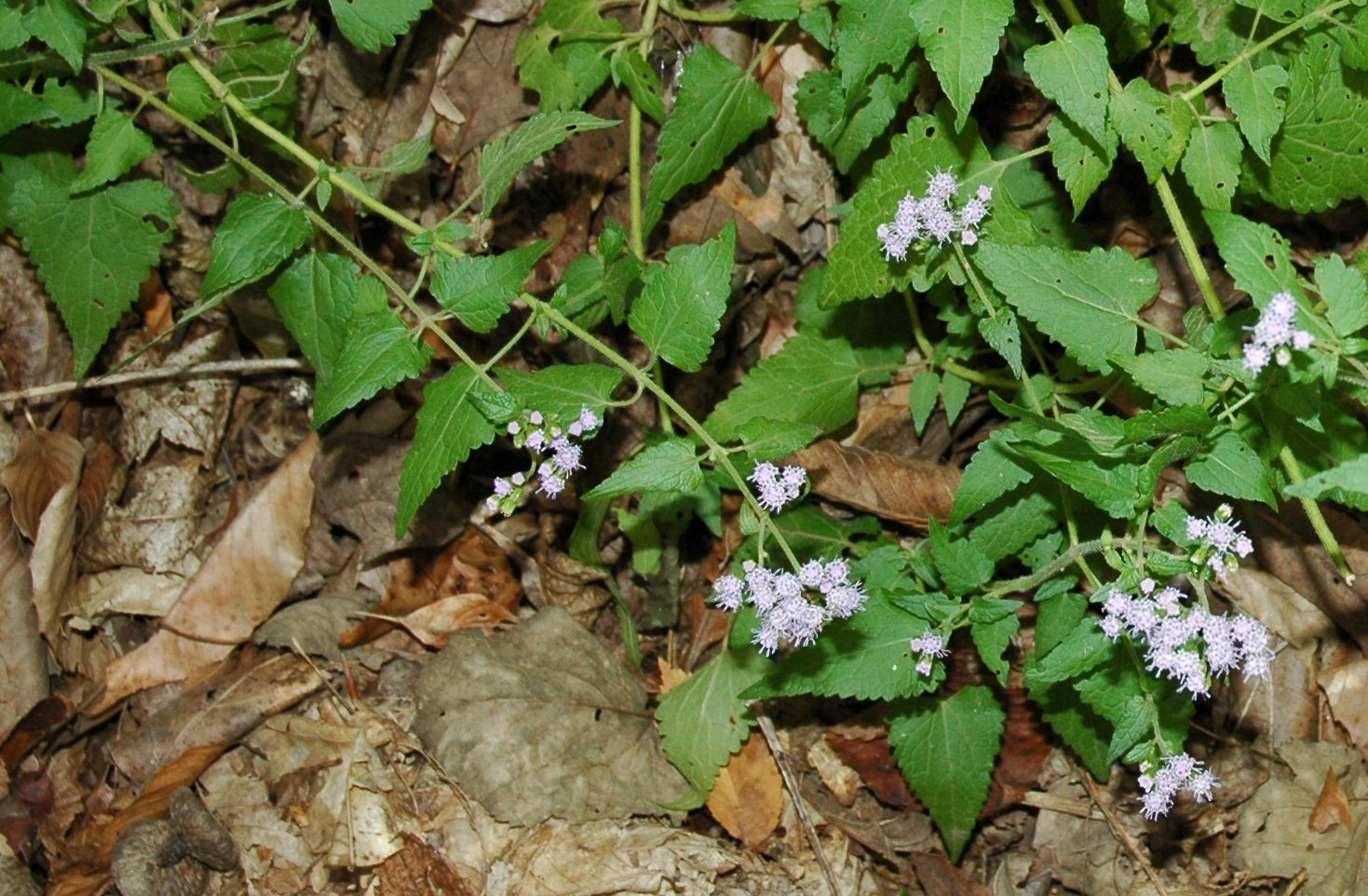

Scientific classification
- Kingdom: Plantae
- Clade: Tracheophytes
- Clade: Angiosperms
- Clade: Eudicots
- Clade: Asterids
- Order: Asterales
- Family: Asteraceae
- Genus: Fleischmannia
- Species: F. incarnata

Binomial name
- Fleischmannia incarnata R.M.King & H.Rob.

Synonyms
- Eupatorium incarnatum Walter 1788; Kyrstenia incarnata (Walter) Greene

= Fleischmannia incarnata =

Species of flowering plant

Fleischmannia incarnata, the pink slender-thoroughwort or pink thoroughwort, is a North American species of flowering plant in the family Asteraceae. It is native to the United States from Florida north as far as Virginia, Ohio, and Illinois, and west to Texas and Oklahoma. It is also found in northeastern Mexico (Veracruz, Tamaulipas, Nuevo León).

Fleischmannia incarnata grows in moist woodlands, thickets, marshes, and along streambanks. It is a perennial herb up to 200 cm (79 in) or 6 2/3 feet) tall. It produces numerous flower heads in a flat-topped array at the ends of the stems, each head with about 20 pink, purple, or whitish disc flowers per head but no ray flowers. The plant attracts butterflies.
