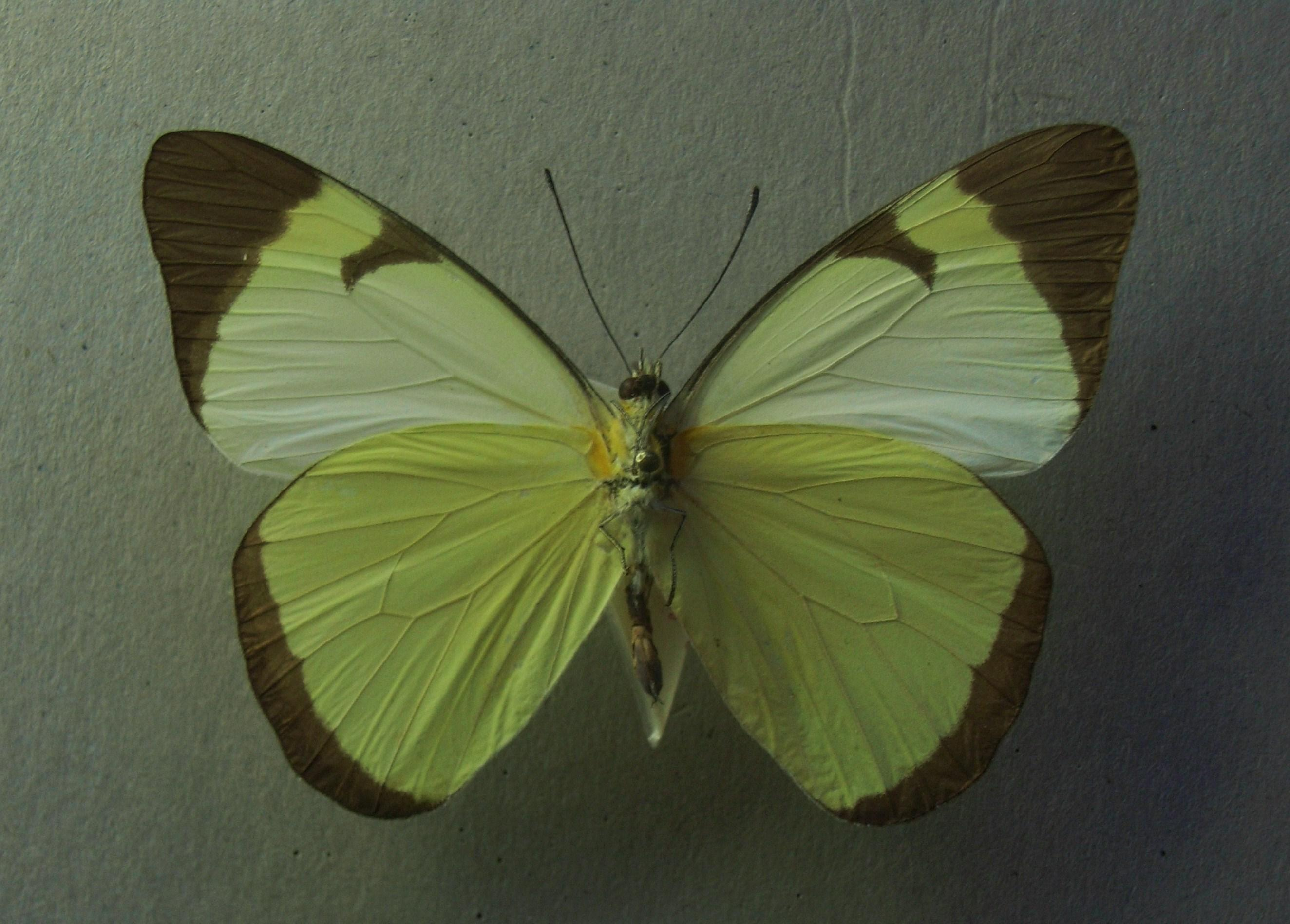

Scientific classification
- Kingdom: Animalia
- Phylum: Arthropoda
- Class: Insecta
- Order: Lepidoptera
- Family: Pieridae
- Genus: Melete
- Species: M. lycimnia

Binomial name
- Melete lycimnia (Cramer, [1777])

Synonyms
- Papilio lycimnia Cramer, [1777]; Mylothris agrippina Hübner, [1819]; Papilio flippantha Fabricius, 1793; Pieris limnoria Godart, [1819]; Mylothris pantoporia Hübner, [1833]; Daptonura hübneri Butler, 1896; Melete lycimnia pantoporia f. fiora Fruhstorfer, 1907; Melete lycimnia pantoporia f. pertho Fruhstorfer, 1907; Pieris isandra Boisduval, 1836; Daptonoura isandra; Melete isandra kleta Fruhstorfer, 1907; Daptonura pedrosina Butler, 1877; Melete lycimnia iphigenia Fruhstorfer, 1907; Melete lycimnia marica Fruhstorfer, 1908; Melete lycimnia donata f. bianca Fruhstorfer, 1908; Melete lycimnia maeotis Fruhstorfer, 1907; Melete lycimnia donata Fruhstorfer, 1907; Melete eurymnia f. asta Fruhstorfer, 1908; Melete lycimnia donata f. monica Fruhstorfer, 1908; Melete lycimnia maeotis f. radiata Fruhstorfer, 1908; Melete lycimnia myrtis Fruhstorfer, 1908; Melete lycimnia donata f. pseudomyrtis Fruhstorfer, 1908; Daptonoura calymnia ab. leucoptera Apolinar, 1926; Daptonura [sic] florinda var. monstrosa Butler, 1875; Daptonoura panamensis Staudinger, 1876; Daptonoura panamensis var. anceps Staudinger, 1876; Melete lycimnia aelia f. pistoria Fruhstorfer, 1908; Daptonoura lycimnia f. semiobscurata Weymer, [1914]; Daptonoura palaestra var. equadorica Strand, 1916; Melete lycimnia gargaphia Fruhstorfer, 1907; Melete lycimnia gargaphia f. amarella Fruhstorfer, 1907; Melete lycimnia petronia f. daulia Fruhstorfer, 1908; Melete lycimnia calymnia f. theodora Fruhtorfer, 1908; Daptonoura lycimnia f. paula Röber, 1909; Melete lycimnia marica f. moesia Fruhstorfer, 1908; Melete lycimnia aelia f. napona Fruhstorfer, 1908; Melete lycimnia maeotis f. velia Fruhstorfer, 1908; Melete lycimnia narmia f. othoca Fruhstorfer, 1910

= Melete lycimnia =

Species of butterfly

Melete lycimnia, the common melwhite, primrose flag or lycimnia white flag, is a butterfly in the family Pieridae. It is found from Texas in the United States to Bolivia. The habitat consists of lowland rainforests.

The wingspan is 52–56 mm (2.0–2.2 in). The appearance of the adults depends on the subspecies and ranges from a white ground colour, narrow black borders, and a yellow spot at the base of the hindwings (M. l. peruviana) to primrose yellow, with wide brown borders (M. l. lycimnia). In all subspecies, females are more yellowish.

The larvae probably feed on Loranthaceae species.

== Subspecies ==
The following subspecies are recognised:

- M. l. lycimnia (Suriname)
- M. l. flippantha (Fabricius, 1793) (Brazil: Rio de Janeiro, Espírito Santo, Minas Gerais)
- M. l. isandra (Boisduval, 1836) (Mexico, Honduras, Costa Rica)
- M. l. peruviana (Lucas, 1852) (Peru, Bolivia, Brazil: Amazonas)
- M. l. aelia (C. & R. Felder, 1861) (Ecuador, Colombia, Peru, Bolivia)
- M. l. eurymnia (C. & R. Felder, 1865) (Colombia)
- M. l. monstrosa (Butler, 1875) (Panama)
- M. l. chagris (Staudinger, 1876) (Panama)
- M. l. harti (Butler, 1896) (Trinidad)
- M. l. latilimbata (Butler, 1896) (Ecuador)
- M. l. petronia Fruhstorfer, 1907 (Brazil: Santa Catarina, Rio Grande do Sul)
- M. l. phazania Fruhstorfer, 1907 (Brazil: Bahia)
- M. l. theodori Fruhstorfer, 1907 (Brazil: Amazonas)
- M. l. paulista Fruhstorfer, 1908 (Brazil: São Paulo)
- M. l. napona (Röber, 1909) (Ecuador, Peru)
- M. l. narmia Fruhstorfer, 1910 (Brazil: Mato Grosso)
