= Guevaria loxensis =

Conservation status
- Endangered (IUCN 3.1)

Scientific classification
- Kingdom: Plantae
- Clade: Tracheophytes
- Clade: Angiosperms
- Clade: Eudicots
- Clade: Asterids
- Order: Asterales
- Family: Asteraceae
- Genus: Guevaria
- Species: G. loxensis

Binomial name
- Guevaria loxensis (S.F.Blake & Steyerm.) R.M.King & H.Rob.

Species of flowering plant

Guevaria loxensis is a species of flowering plant in the family Asteraceae. It is found only in Ecuador. Its natural habitat is subtropical or tropical moist montane forests. It is threatened by habitat loss.
