= Anstenoptilia hugoiella =

Scientific classification
- Domain: Eukaryota
- Kingdom: Animalia
- Phylum: Arthropoda
- Class: Insecta
- Order: Lepidoptera
- Family: Pterophoridae
- Genus: Anstenoptilia
- Species: A. hugoiella

Binomial name
- Anstenoptilia hugoiella Gielis, 1996

Synonyms
- Platyptilia pediculosa Walsingham (nomen nudum)

Species of plume moth

Anstenoptilia hugoiella is a moth of the family Pterophoridae. It is known from Brazil, Colombia, Ecuador, Peru and Venezuela.

The wingspan is 18–20 mm. Adults are on wing in February, March and August.
