= Fleischmannia harlingii =

Conservation status
- Vulnerable (IUCN 3.1)

Scientific classification
- Kingdom: Plantae
- Clade: Tracheophytes
- Clade: Angiosperms
- Clade: Eudicots
- Clade: Asterids
- Order: Asterales
- Family: Asteraceae
- Genus: Fleischmannia
- Species: F. harlingii

Binomial name
- Fleischmannia harlingii R.M.King & H.Rob.

Species of flowering plant

Fleischmannia harlingii is a species of flowering plant in the family Asteraceae. It is found only in Ecuador. Its natural habitat is subtropical or tropical dry shrubland. It is a perennial herb up to 50 cm tall. It produces numerous flower heads in a branching array at the ends of the stems, each head with about 20 white disc flowers per head but no ray flowers.

The species is threatened by habitat loss.
