= Ageratum iltisii =

Conservation status
- Vulnerable (IUCN 3.1)

Scientific classification
- Kingdom: Plantae
- Clade: Tracheophytes
- Clade: Angiosperms
- Clade: Eudicots
- Clade: Asterids
- Order: Asterales
- Family: Asteraceae
- Genus: Ageratum
- Species: A. iltisii

Binomial name
- Ageratum iltisii R.M.King & H.Rob.

Species of flowering plant

Ageratum iltisii is a species of flowering plant in the family of Asteraceae. It is endemic to Ecuador.

Its natural habitat is subtropical or tropical moist montane forests. It is currently recorded as being threatened by habitat loss.
