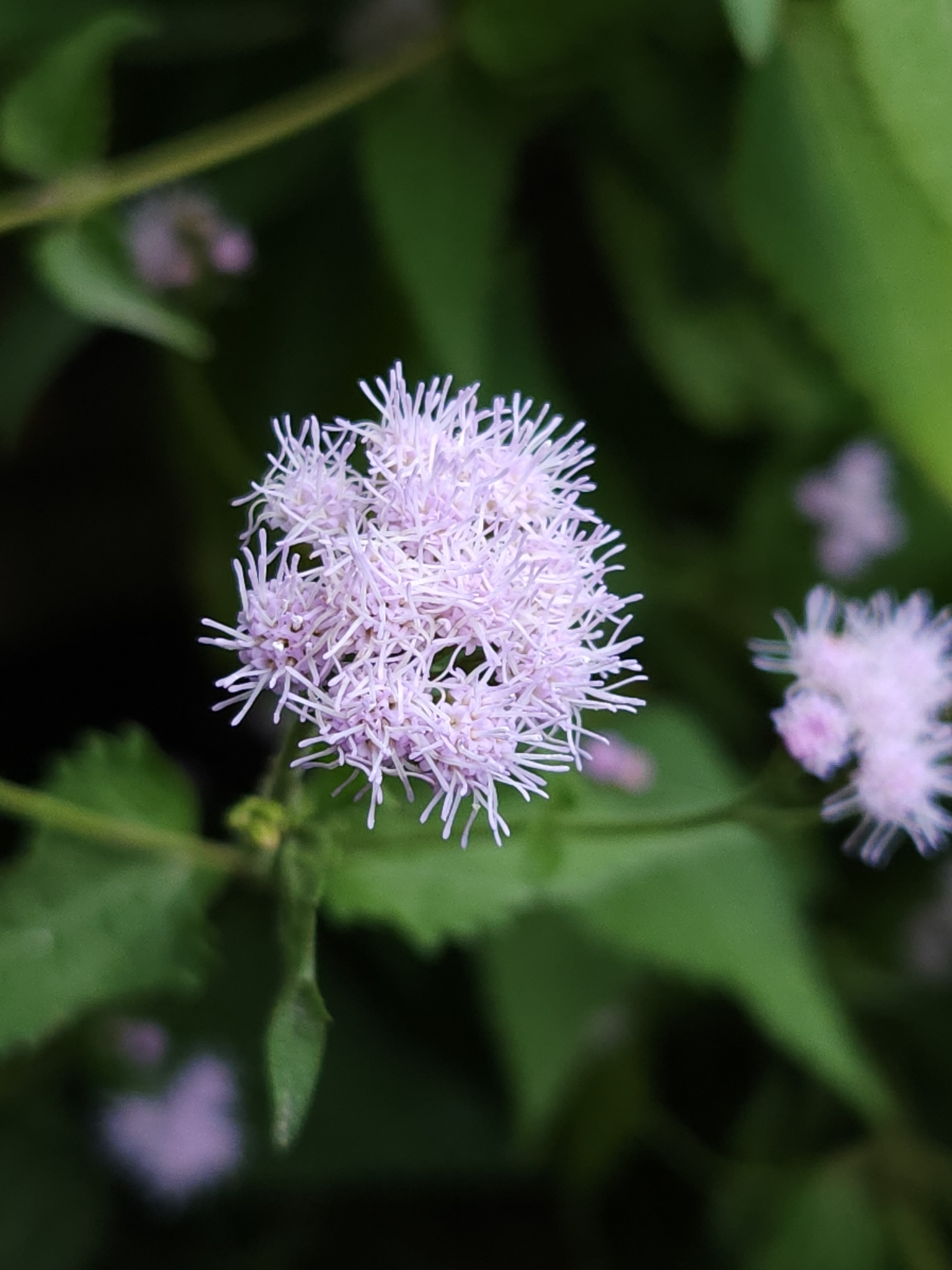

Scientific classification
- Kingdom: Plantae
- Clade: Tracheophytes
- Clade: Angiosperms
- Clade: Eudicots
- Clade: Asterids
- Order: Asterales
- Family: Asteraceae
- Genus: Fleischmannia
- Species: F. sonorae

Binomial name
- Fleischmannia sonorae (A.Gray) R.M.King & H.Rob.

Synonyms
- Eupatorium schiedeanum var. grosse-dentatum A.Gray; Eupatorium sonorae A.Gray

= Fleischmannia sonorae =

Species of flowering plant

Fleischmannia sonorae, the Sonoran slender-thoroughwort or Sonoran thoroughwort, is a North American species of flowering plant in the family Asteraceae. It is native to western Mexico from Sonora and Chihuahua as far south as Michoacán, as well as from the southwestern United States (Arizona and New Mexico).

Fleischmannia sonorae grows along streambanks and on rocky slopes. It is a perennial herb up to 80 cm (31 in) tall. It produces numerous flower heads in a flat-topped array at the ends of the stems, each head with pale purple disc flowers per head but no ray flowers.
