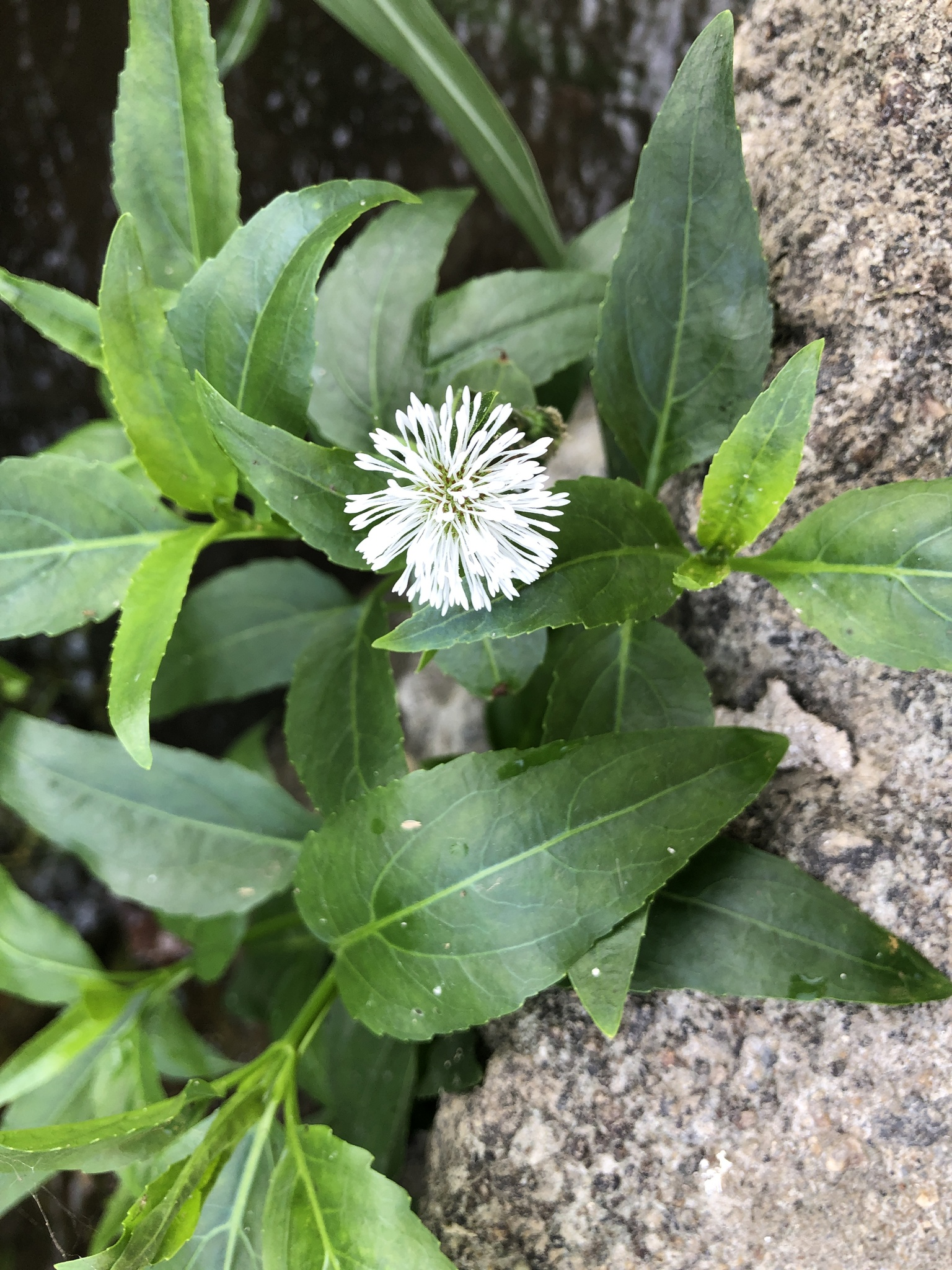

Scientific classification
- Kingdom: Plantae
- Clade: Tracheophytes
- Clade: Angiosperms
- Clade: Eudicots
- Clade: Asterids
- Order: Asterales
- Family: Asteraceae
- Genus: Gymnocoronis
- Species: G. spilanthoides

Binomial name
- Gymnocoronis spilanthoides DC.

= Gymnocoronis spilanthoides =

Species of plant

Gymnocoronis spilanthoides, also known by its common name Senegal tea or Senegal tea plant is a species from the genus Gymnocoronis. The species was first described by Augustin Pyramus de Candolle.

In the European Union, the species features since 2019 on the list of invasive alien species of Union concern. This means that import of the species and trade in the species is forbidden in the whole of the EU.
