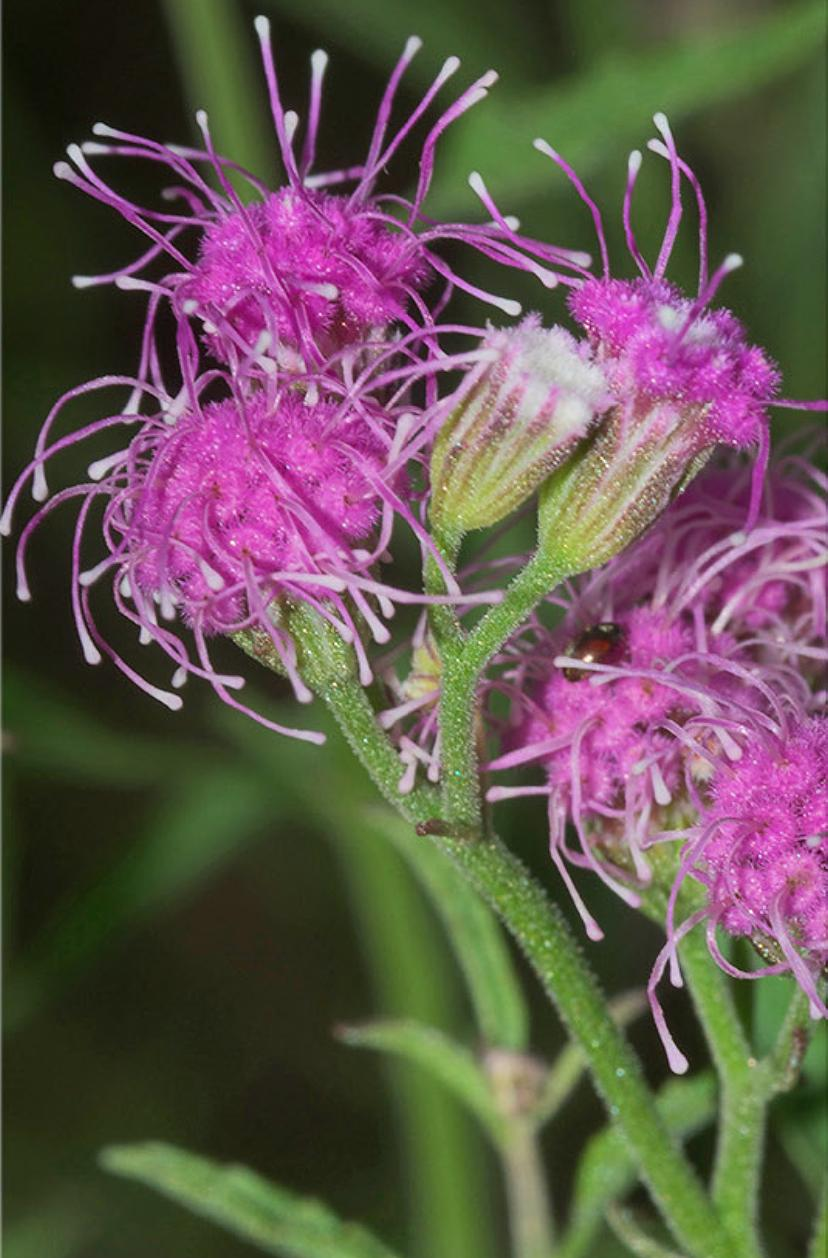
- Trichogonia campestris

Scientific classification
- Kingdom: Plantae
- Clade: Tracheophytes
- Clade: Angiosperms
- Clade: Eudicots
- Clade: Asterids
- Order: Asterales
- Family: Asteraceae
- Subfamily: Asteroideae
- Tribe: Eupatorieae
- Genus: Trichogonia (DC.) Gardner

Synonyms
- Kuhnia sect. Trichogonia DC.

= Trichogonia =

Genus of flowering plants

Trichogonia is a genus of South American plants in the tribe Eupatorieae within the family Asteraceae.

Species

- Trichogonia arguta
- Trichogonia attenuata
- Trichogonia bishopii
- Trichogonia campestris
- Trichogonia capitata
- Trichogonia chodatii
- Trichogonia cinerea
- Trichogonia crenulata
- Trichogonia dubia
- Trichogonia fiebrigii
- Trichogonia grazielae
- Trichogonia harleyi
- Trichogonia hassleri
- Trichogonia heringeri
- Trichogonia hirtiflora
- Trichogonia laxa
- Trichogonia martii
- Trichogonia menthifolia
- Trichogonia munhozii
- Trichogonia phlebodes
- Trichogonia prancii
- Trichogonia pseudocampestris
- Trichogonia rhadinocarpa
- Trichogonia rhodotricha
- Trichogonia salviifolia
- Trichogonia santosii
- Trichogonia scottmorii
- Trichogonia spathuliolia
- Trichogonia tombadorensis
- Trichogonia villosa
- Trichogonia zehntneri

formerly included

see Acritopappus Campuloclinium Platypodanthera Trichogoniopsis

- Trichogonia barrosoana - Campuloclinium campuloclinioides
- Trichogonia gardneri - Trichogoniopsis adenantha
- Trichogonia leiantha - Trichogoniopsis adenantha
- Trichogonia macrolepis - Trichogoniopsis adenantha
- Trichogonia macrolepis - Trichogoniopsis podocarpa
- Trichogonia melissaefolia - Platypodanthera melissaefolia
- Trichogonia podocarpa - Trichogoniopsis podocarpa
- Trichogonia scabra - Campuloclinium tubaraoense
- Trichogonia selloi - Trichogoniopsis adenantha
- Trichogonia selowii - Trichogoniopsis adenantha
- Trichogonia viscosa - Acritopappus longifolius
