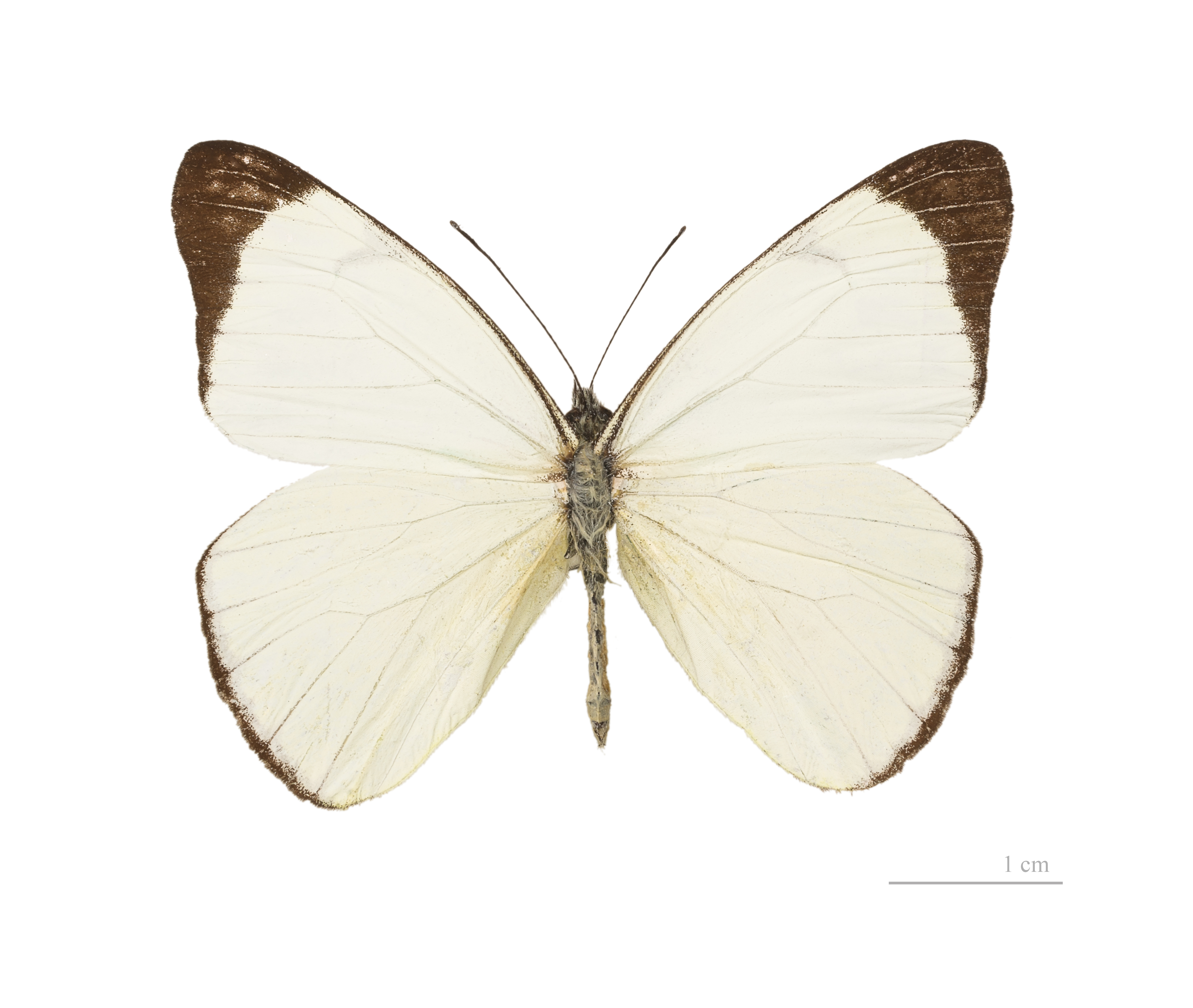
- Melete leucadia - Muséum de Toulouse

Scientific classification
- Kingdom: Animalia
- Phylum: Arthropoda
- Clade: Pancrustacea
- Class: Insecta
- Order: Lepidoptera
- Family: Pieridae
- Tribe: Pierini
- Genus: Melete; Swainson, 1831

Synonyms
- Daptonoura Butler, 1869

= Melete (butterfly) =

Genus of butterflies

Melete is a Neotropical genus of butterflies in the family Pieridae. The genus was erected by William Swainson in 1831.

== Species ==
- Melete calymnia (C. Felder & R. Felder, 1862)
- Melete leucadia (C. Felder & R. Felder, 1862)
- Melete leucanthe (C. Felder & R. Felder, 1861)
- Melete lycimnia (Cramer, 1777)
- Melete polyhymnia (C. Felder & R. Felder, 1865)
- Melete salacia (Godart, 1819)
