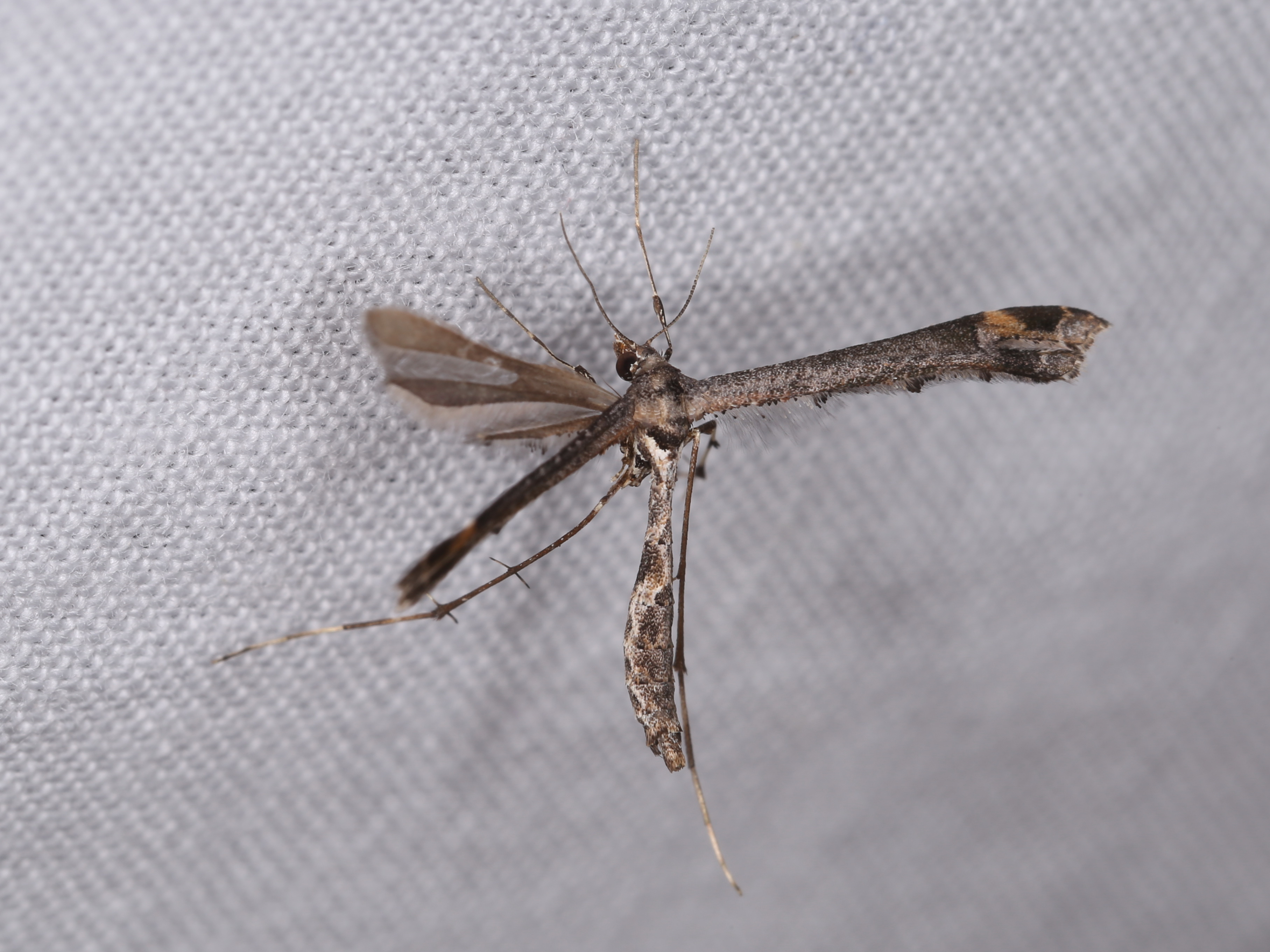
- Anstenoptilia marmarodactyla

Scientific classification
- Kingdom: Animalia
- Phylum: Arthropoda
- Class: Insecta
- Order: Lepidoptera
- Family: Pterophoridae
- Tribe: Platyptiliini
- Genus: Anstenoptilia; Zimmerman, 1958

= Anstenoptilia =

Plume moth genus

Anstenoptilia is a genus of moths in the family Pterophoridae.

== Species ==
- Anstenoptilia hugoiella Gielis, 1996
- Anstenoptilia marmarodactyla (Dyar, 1903)
