= Platypodanthera =

Scientific classification
- Kingdom: Plantae
- Clade: Embryophytes
- Clade: Tracheophytes
- Clade: Angiosperms
- Clade: Eudicots
- Clade: Asterids
- Order: Asterales
- Family: Asteraceae
- Subfamily: Asteroideae
- Tribe: Eupatorieae
- Genus: Platypodanthera; R.M. King & H. Rob.
- Species: P. melissifolia

Binomial name
- Platypodanthera melissifolia (DC.) R.M.King & H.Rob.

Synonyms
- Platypodanthera melissaefolia (DC.) R.M.King & H.Rob., alternate spelling; Carelia melissaefolia (DC.) Kuntze, alternate spelling; Trichogonia melissaefolia (DC.) Mattf., alternate spelling; Eupatorium nudum Gardner; Ageratum melissaefolium DC., alternate spelling; Carelia melissifolia (DC.) Kuntze; Trichogonia melissifolia (DC.) Mattf.; Ageratum melissifolium DC.

Genus of plants

Platypodanthera is a genus of plants in the tribe Eupatorieae within the family Asteraceae.

== Species ==
The only known species is Platypodanthera melissifolia, native to eastern Brazil (States of Bahia and Pernambuco).
