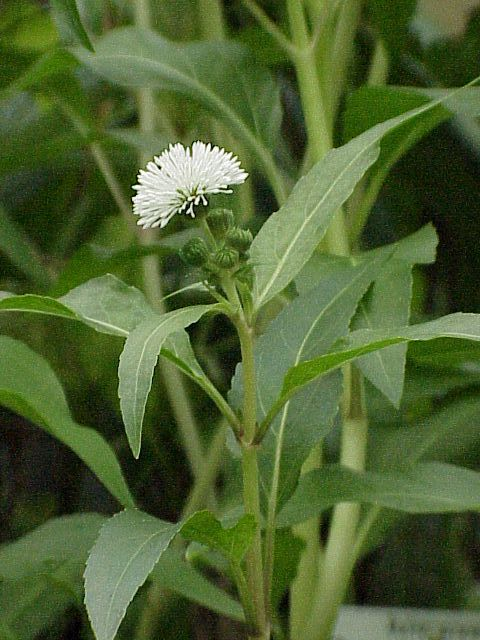
- Gymnocoronis spilanthoides

Scientific classification
- Kingdom: Plantae
- Clade: Embryophytes
- Clade: Tracheophytes
- Clade: Angiosperms
- Clade: Eudicots
- Clade: Asterids
- Order: Asterales
- Family: Asteraceae
- Subfamily: Asteroideae
- Tribe: Eupatorieae
- Genus: Gymnocoronis; DC.

Type species
- Gymnocoronis attenuata DC.

= Gymnocoronis =

Genus of flowering plants

Gymnocoronis is a genus of flowering plants in the family Asteraceae.

Species

- Gymnocoronis latifolia Hook. & Arn. - Guatemala, Mexico (from Tamaulipas to Chiapas)
- Gymnocoronis matudae R.M.King & H.Rob. - Campeche
- Gymnocoronis sessilis S.F.Blake - Tabasco, Chiapas, Veracruz, Jalisco, Guatemala
- Gymnocoronis spilanthoides (D.Don ex Hook. & Arn.) DC. - Brazil, Peru, Bolivia, Paraguay, Uruguay, Argentina; naturalized in Australia, New Zealand, China, Europe : France in Sarthe.
