= Guevaria =

Scientific classification
- Kingdom: Plantae
- Clade: Embryophytes
- Clade: Tracheophytes
- Clade: Spermatophytes
- Clade: Angiosperms
- Clade: Eudicots
- Clade: Asterids
- Order: Asterales
- Family: Asteraceae
- Subfamily: Asteroideae
- Tribe: Eupatorieae
- Genus: Guevaria; R.M.King & H.Rob.

Type species
- Piqueria sodiroi Hieron. ex Sodiro

Genus of flowering plants

Guevaria is a genus of South American flowering plants in the family Asteraceae.

Species

- Guevaria alvaroi R.M.King & H.Rob.
- Guevaria loxensis (S.F.Blake & Steyerm.) R.M.King & H.Rob.
- Guevaria micranthera H.Rob.
- Guevaria sodiroi (Hieron. ex Sodiro) R.M.King & H.Rob.
- Guevaria vargasii (Chung) R.M.King & H.Rob.
