= Teixeiranthus =

Scientific classification
- Kingdom: Plantae
- Clade: Tracheophytes
- Clade: Angiosperms
- Clade: Eudicots
- Clade: Asterids
- Order: Asterales
- Family: Asteraceae
- Subfamily: Asteroideae
- Tribe: Eupatorieae
- Genus: Teixeiranthus; R.M. King & H.Rob.
- Species: T. foliosus

Binomial name
- Teixeiranthus foliosus (Gardner) R.M.King & H.Rob

Synonyms
- Isocarpha foliosa Gardner (type species of Teixeiranthus); Alomia foliosa (Gardner) Benth. & Hook.f.; Piqueria foliosa (Gardner) Gardner

Genus of plants

Teixeiranthus is a genus of flowering plants in the tribe Eupatorieae within the family Asteraceae. As of March 2024, the Global Compositae Database accepted only one species, Teixeiranthus foliosus, endemic to northeast Brazil.

Teixeiranthus pohlii is accepted as Ageratum pohlii.
