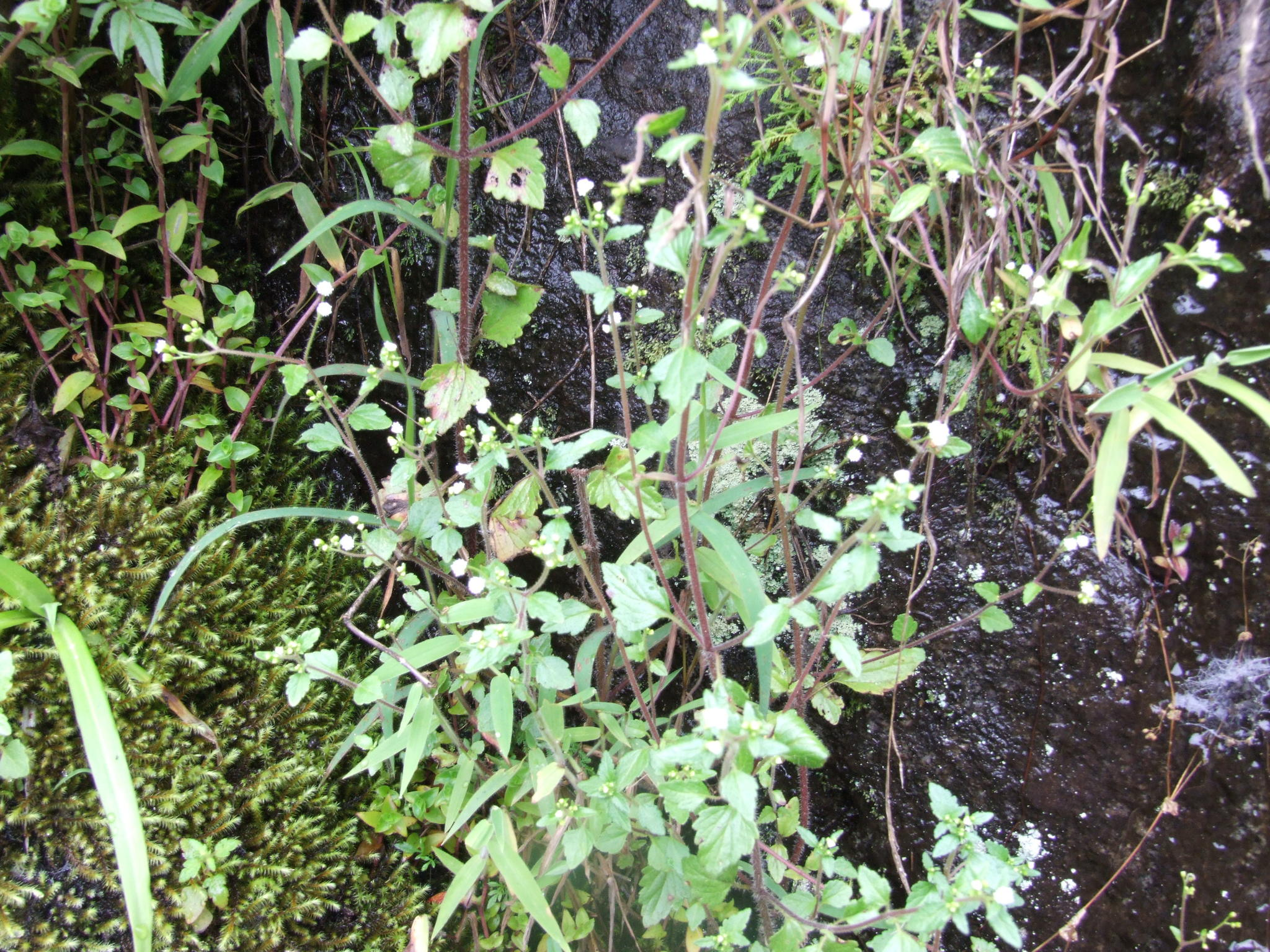

Scientific classification
- Kingdom: Plantae
- Clade: Tracheophytes
- Clade: Angiosperms
- Clade: Eudicots
- Clade: Asterids
- Order: Asterales
- Family: Asteraceae
- Subfamily: Asteroideae
- Tribe: Eupatorieae
- Genus: Ellenbergia; Cuatrec.
- Species: E. glandulata

Binomial name
- Ellenbergia glandulata Cuatrec.

Synonyms
- Piqueria setifera Chung

= Ellenbergia =

Ellenbergia glandulata

Species of plant

Ellenbergia is a genus of flowering plants in the family Asteraceae.

There is only one known species, Ellenbergia glandulata, endemic to the Cuzco region of Peru. It is listed as endangered.
