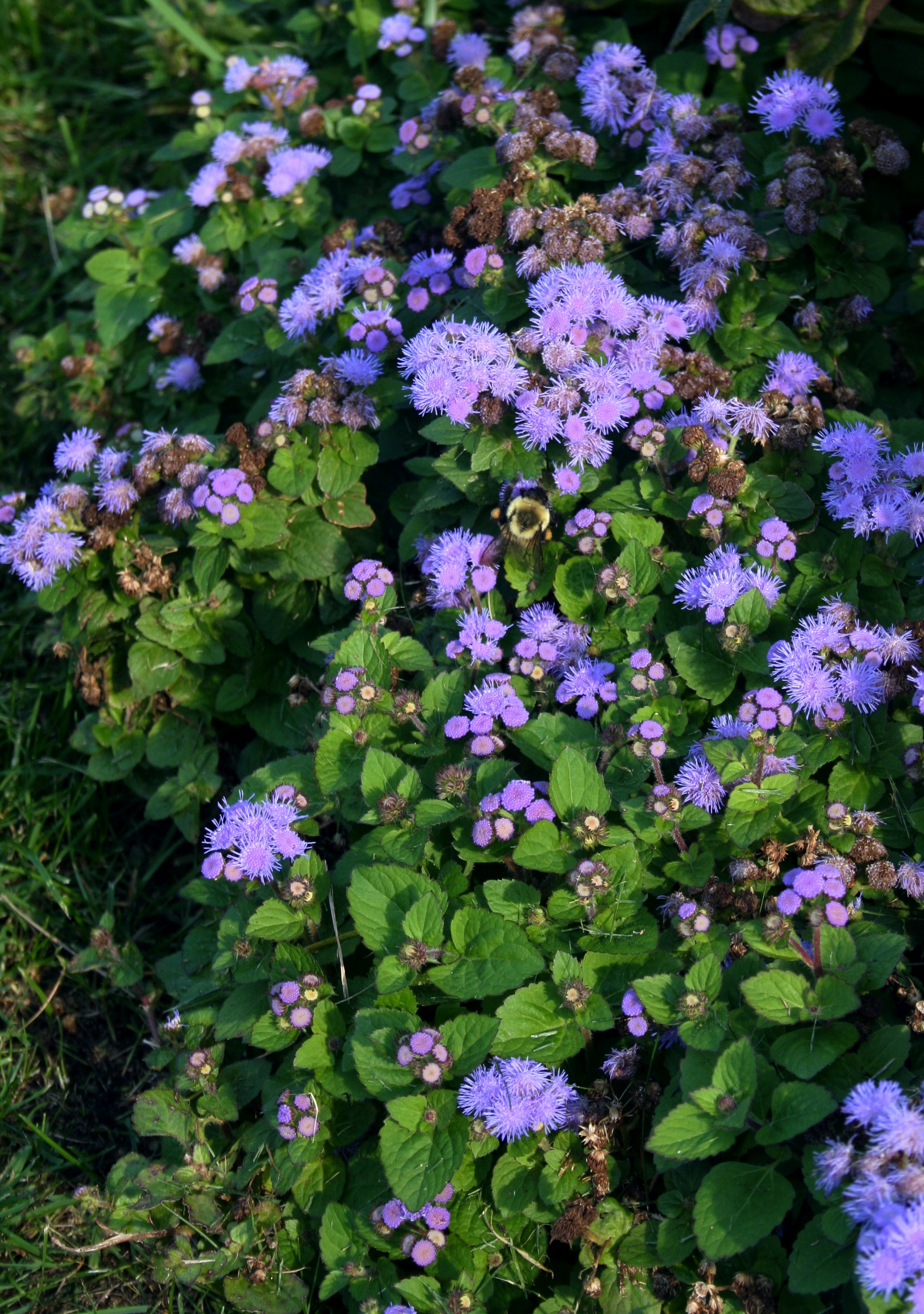

Scientific classification
- Kingdom: Plantae
- Clade: Tracheophytes
- Clade: Angiosperms
- Clade: Eudicots
- Clade: Asterids
- Order: Asterales
- Family: Asteraceae
- Genus: Ageratum
- Species: A. houstonianum

Binomial name
- Ageratum houstonianum Mill.

Synonyms
- Synonymy: Ageratum mexicanum Sweet; Ageratum mexicanum Sims; Ageratum wendlandii Hort. ex Vilm.; Ageratum wendlandii Bailly; Cacalia mentrasto Vell.; Carelia houstoniana (Mill.) Kuntze

= Ageratum houstonianum =

Species of plant

Ageratum houstonianum, commonly known as flossflower, bluemink, goatweed, blueweed, pussy foot or Mexican paintbrush, is a cool-season annual plant often grown as bedding in gardens.

== Description ==
This herbaceous annual or dwarf shrub grows to 0.3–1 m (1 ft 0 in – 3 ft 3 in) high, with ovate to triangular leaves 2–7 cm (0.79–2.76 in) long, and blue flowerheads (sometimes white, pink, or purple). The flower heads are borne in dense corymbs. The ray flowers are threadlike and fluff-haired, leading to the common name. The narrow lanceolate bracts are pointed, denticulate only at the top and glandular hairy. The flowering period is from May to November in the northern hemisphere. The plant attracts butterflies.

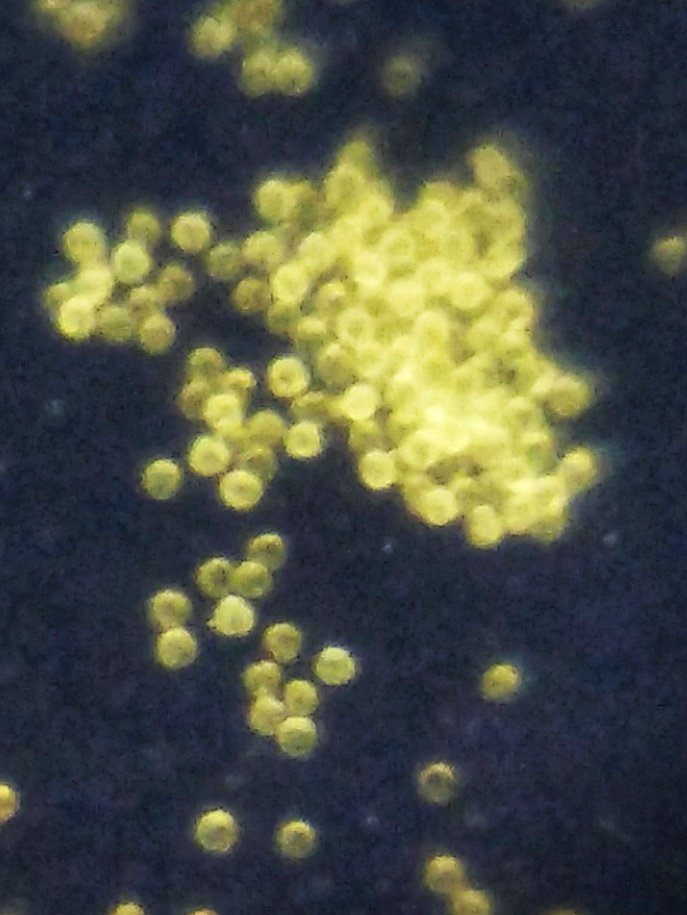
Pollens of Ageratum houstonianum

== Range ==
The plant is native to Central America in Guatemala and Belize, and adjacent parts of Mexico, but has become an invasive weed in other areas. It was also naturalized in large parts of the tropics and in the southern United States. Its habitat is pastures, moist forest clearings and bushes up to altitudes of 1,000 metres (3,280 ft).

Today, it is widely used as an ornamental plant for summer borders and balcony boxes, high varieties also as cut flowers. The species is cultivated once a year, having numerous varieties whose crowns may be dark blue, purple, pink and white. Preferring cool soils and exposure in full sun, high varieties reach stature heights up to 60 centimetres (24 in).

== Chemistry ==
Ageratum has evolved a unique method of protecting itself from insects: it produces a methoprene-like compound which interferes with the normal function of the corpus allatum, the organ responsible for secreting juvenile hormone during insect growth and development. This chemical triggers the next molting cycle to prematurely develop adult structures, and can render most insects sterile if ingested in large enough quantities.

=== Toxicity ===
Ageratum houstonianum is toxic to grazing animals, causing liver lesions. It contains pyrrolizidine alkaloids.

== Weed risk ==
Ageratum houstonianum is prone to becoming a rampant environmental weed when grown outside of its natural range. It has become an invasive weed in the United States, Australia, Europe, Africa, China, Japan, New Zealand, and the Philippines.

== Varieties ==
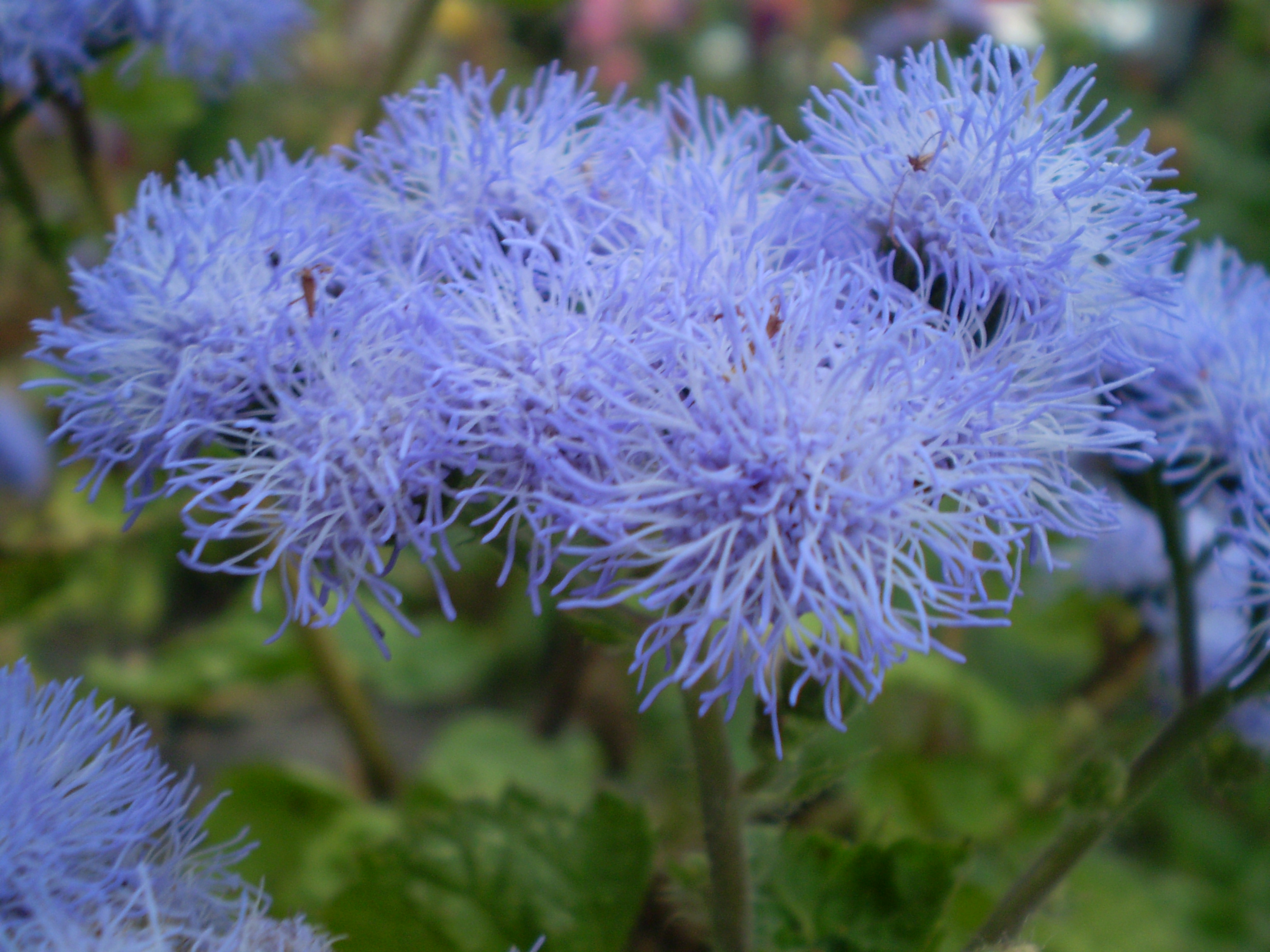

- Ageratum houstonianum var. angustatum B.L. Rob.
- Ageratum houstonianum f. isochroum
- Ageratum houstonianum f. luteum
- Ageratum houstonianum var. muticescens
- Ageratum houstonianum f. niveum
- Ageratum houstonianum f. normale
- Ageratum houstonianum var. typicum
- Ageratum houstonianum f. versicolor

The cultivars 'Blue Danube' and 'Blue Horizon' have gained the Royal Horticultural Society's Award of Garden Merit.
