= Alomia =

Scientific classification
- Kingdom: Plantae
- Clade: Tracheophytes
- Clade: Angiosperms
- Clade: Eudicots
- Clade: Asterids
- Order: Asterales
- Family: Asteraceae
- Subfamily: Asteroideae
- Tribe: Eupatorieae
- Genus: Alomia; Kunth

Type species
- Alomia ageratoides Kunth

Synonyms
- Dadia Vell.

Genus of flowering plants

Alomia is a genus of flowering plants in the family Asteraceae, described as a genus in 1818.

Alomia is endemic to Mexico.

Species

- Alomia ageratoides Kunth - Mexico
- Alomia alata Hemsl. - Guerrero, Morelos, México State
- Alomia callosa (S.Watson) B.L.Rob. - Jalisco
- Alomia hintonii R.M.King & H.Rob. - México State
- Alomia stenolepis S.F.Blake - Sonora
