= Croton barahonensis =

Scientific classification
- Kingdom: Plantae
- Clade: Tracheophytes
- Clade: Angiosperms
- Clade: Eudicots
- Clade: Rosids
- Order: Malpighiales
- Family: Euphorbiaceae
- Genus: Croton
- Species: C. barahonensis

Binomial name
- Croton barahonensis Urb.

Species of flowering plant

Croton barahonensis is a species of plant of the genus Croton and the family of Euphorbiaceae, present in the Dominican Republic on the island of Hispaniola.
