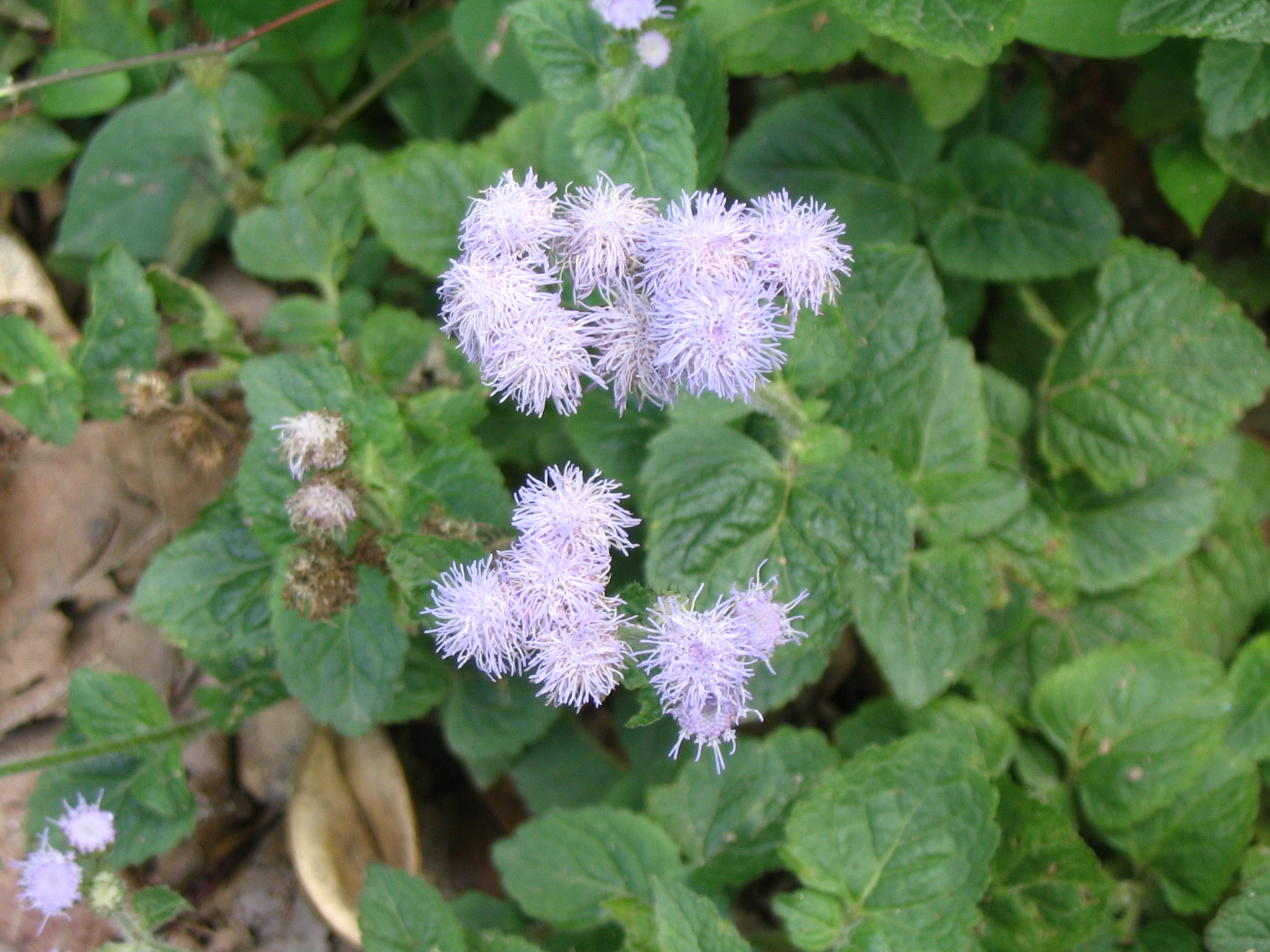

Conservation status
- Secure (NatureServe)

Scientific classification
- Kingdom: Plantae
- Clade: Embryophytes
- Clade: Tracheophytes
- Clade: Spermatophytes
- Clade: Angiosperms
- Clade: Eudicots
- Clade: Asterids
- Order: Asterales
- Family: Asteraceae
- Genus: Ageratum
- Species: A. conyzoides

Binomial name
- Ageratum conyzoides L. 1753 not Hieron. 1895 nor Sieber ex Steud. 1840

Synonyms
- Synonymy: Ageratum album Hort.Berol. ex Hornem.; Ageratum arsenei B.L.Rob.; Ageratum brachystephanum Regel; Ageratum ciliare L.; Ageratum ciliare Lour.; Ageratum coeruleum Desf. 1804, rejected name not Sieber ex Baker 1876; Ageratum cordifolium Roxb.; Ageratum hirsutum Lam.; Ageratum hirsutum Poir.; Ageratum humile Larran.; Ageratum humile Salisb.; Ageratum humile Larrañaga; Ageratum iltisii R.M.King & H.Rob.; Ageratum latifolium Cav.; Ageratum microcarpum (Benth. ex Benth.) Hemsl.; Ageratum muticum Griseb.; Ageratum obtusifolium Lam.; Ageratum odoratum Vilm.; Ageratum odoratum Bailly; Ageratum suffruticosum Regel; Cacalia mentrasto Vell. Conc.; Caelestina latifolia (Cav.) Benth. ex Oerst.; Caelestina microcarpa Benth. ex Oerst.; Caelestina suffruticosa Sweet; Carelia brachystephana (Regel) Kuntze; Carelia conyzoides (L.) Kuntze; Carelia mutica (Griseb.) Kuntze; Eupatorium conyzoides (L.) E. H. Krause; Eupatorium paleaceum Sessé & Moc.; Sparganophorus obtusifolius Lag.

= Ageratum conyzoides =

Species of plant

Ageratum conyzoides (billygoat-weed, chick weed, goatweed, whiteweed, mentrasto) is native to Tropical America, especially Brazil, and is an invasive weed in many other regions. It is an herb that is 0.5–1 m. high, with ovate leaves 2–6 cm long, and flowers are white to mauve.

In Vietnamese, the plant is called cứt lợn (meaning "pig feces") due to its growth in dirty areas.

== Uses ==
As a medicinal plant, Ageratum conyzoides is widely used by many traditional cultures against dysentery and diarrhea. It is also an insecticide and nematicide.

== Toxicity ==
Ingesting A. conyzoides can cause liver lesions and tumors. There was a mass poisoning incident in Ethiopia as a result of contamination of grain with A. conyzoides. The plant contains the pyrrolizidine alkaloids lycopsamine and echinatine.

== Weed risk ==
A. conyzoides is prone to becoming a rampant environmental weed when grown outside of its natural range. It is an invasive weed in Africa, Australia, Southeast Asia, Hawaii, and the USA. It is considered a moderate weed of rice cultivation in Asia.

== Gallery ==
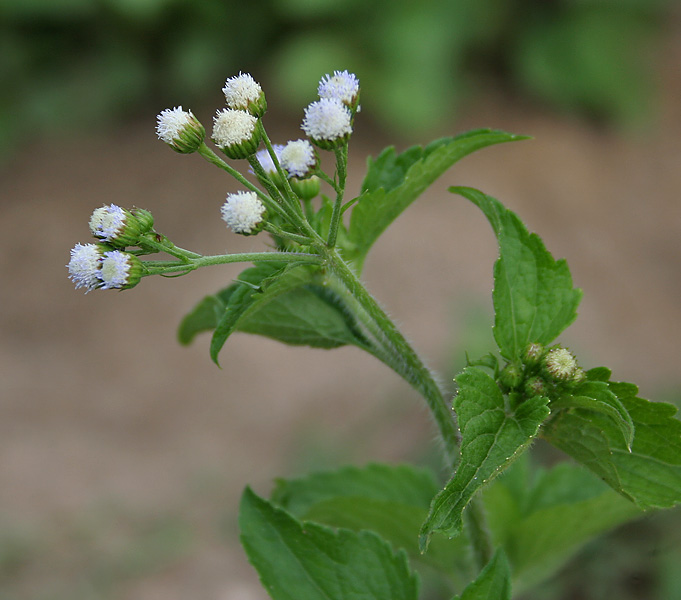
in Narsapur, Medak district.

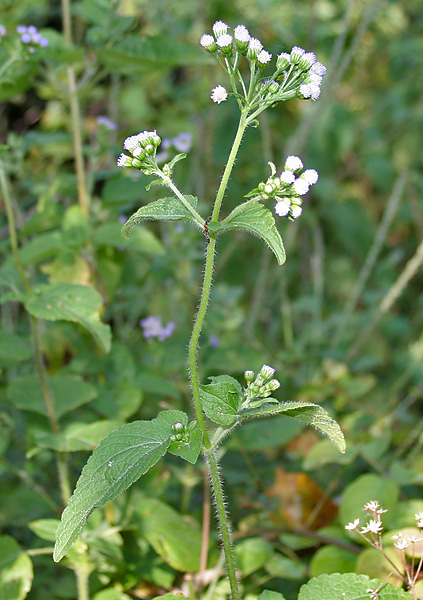
in Narsapur, Medak district.

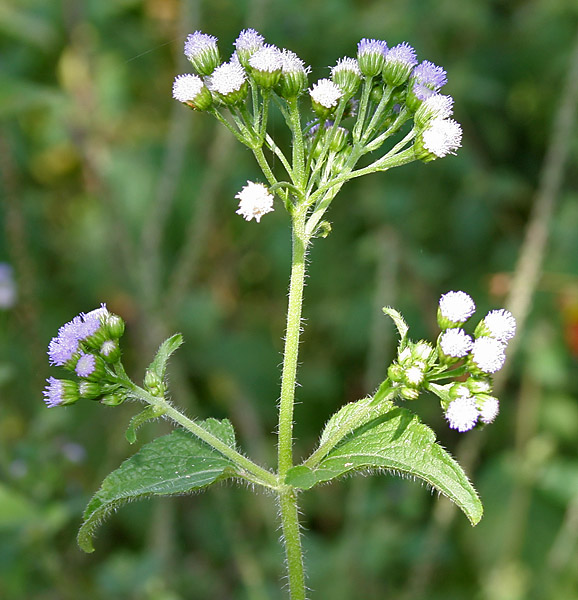
in Narsapur, Medak district.

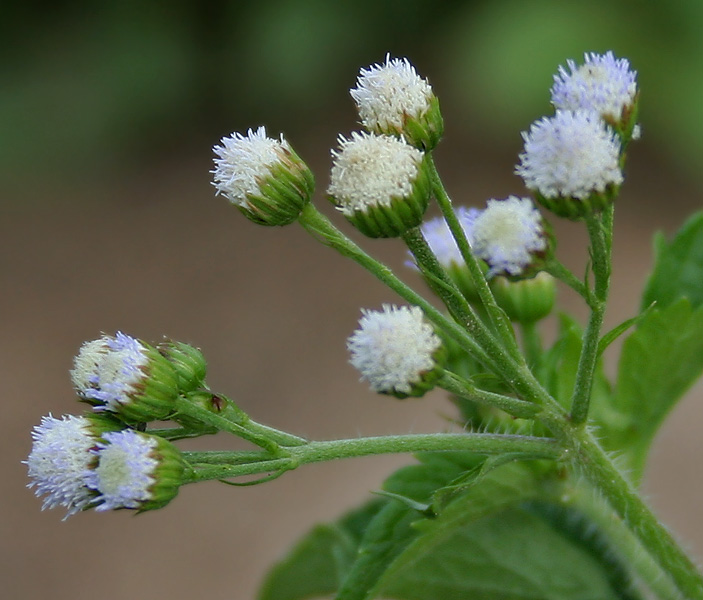
in Narsapur, Medak district.

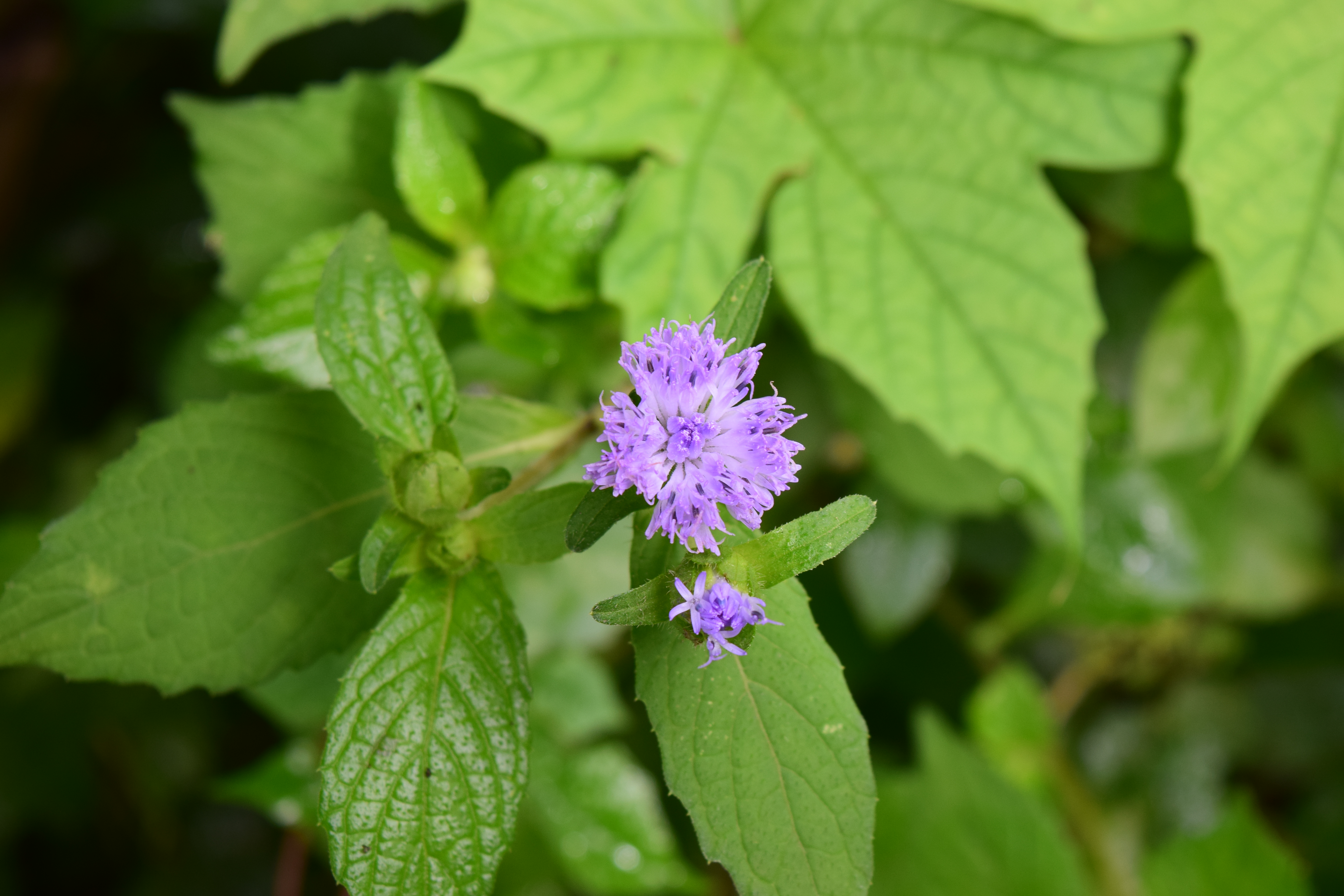
From Kerala.

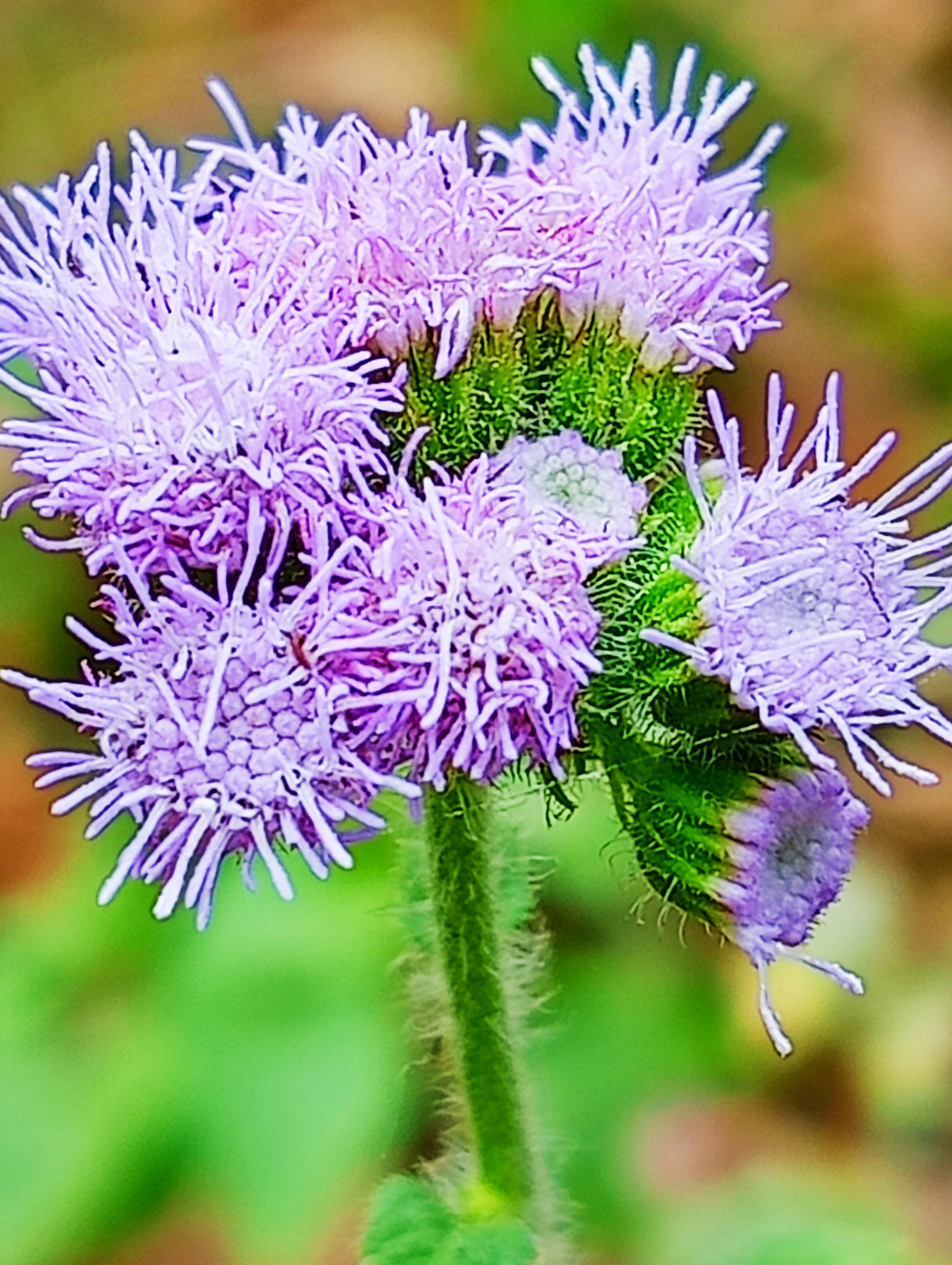
in Assam Don Bosco University Campus, Tapesia Gardens
