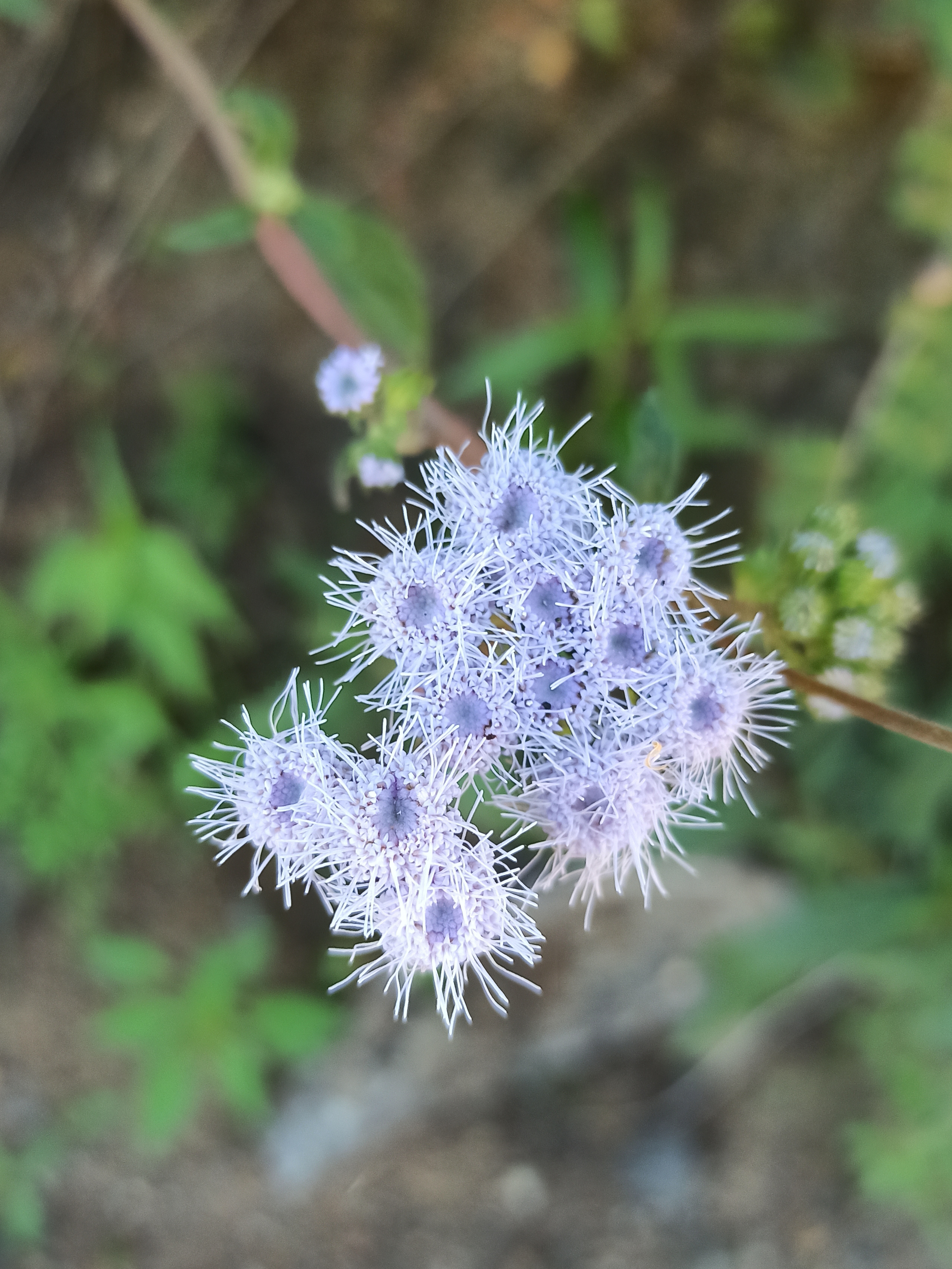
- Ageratum corymbosum

Scientific classification
- Kingdom: Plantae
- Clade: Embryophytes
- Clade: Tracheophytes
- Clade: Spermatophytes
- Clade: Angiosperms
- Clade: Eudicots
- Clade: Asterids
- Order: Asterales
- Family: Asteraceae
- Subfamily: Asteroideae
- Tribe: Eupatorieae
- Genus: Ageratum; L. 1753 not Mill. 1754 (Plantaginaceae)

= Ageratum =

Genus of plants

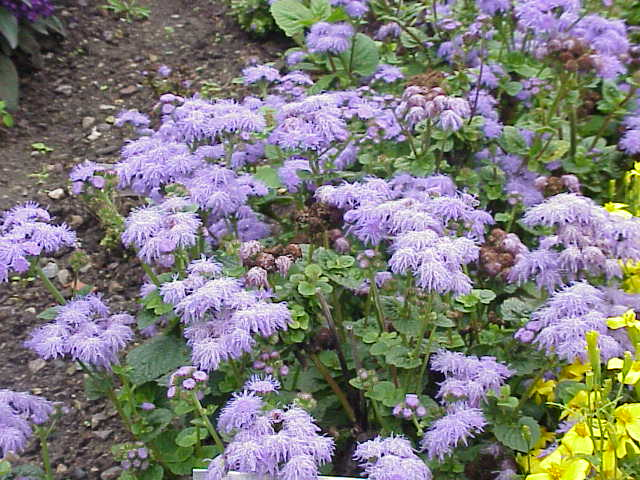
Bluemink (Ageratum houstonianum)

Ageratum (/əˈdʒɛrətəm/) (whiteweed in the US) is a genus of 40 to 60 tropical and warm temperate flowering annuals and perennials from the family Asteraceae, tribe Eupatorieae. Most species are native to Central America and Mexico but four are native to the United States.

They form tussocks or small mounds. They grow to a height of 30 inches (76 cm). The opposite leaves are cordate or oval, hairy or tomentose. The margins are slightly toothed or serrate. The leaves form compact clusters.

The fluffy flowers are lavender-blue, pink, lilac, or white, and spread in small compound umbels. They give small, dry fruits.

== Cultivation ==
Ageratums are grown for their flowers, especially A. houstonianum.

Most common ageratums, "Hawaii" for example, are a short 6–8 inches (15–20 cm) when full grown. Tall ageratum are also available in seed catalogues. They are about 18 inches (46 cm) in height with blue flowers. There is also a medium-height snowcapped variety, white top on blue flowers. The blues are most popular and common, but colors also include violet, pink and white. Their size and color makes ageratums good candidates for rock gardens, bedding, and containers. They grow well in sun or partial shade, from early summer to first frost. They are quite easy to grow, producing a profusion of fluffy flowers all season long.

== Toxicity ==
Several species of Ageratum are toxic, containing pyrrolizidine alkaloids. Ageratum houstonianum and Ageratum conyzoides cause liver lesions and are tumorigenic.

== Weed risk ==
Ageratum conyzoides and Ageratum houstonianum are prone to becoming rampant environmental weeds when grown outside of their natural range.

== Species ==
As of July 2020, Plants of the World online has 40 accepted species:

- Ageratum albidum Hemsl.
- Ageratum ballotifolium (Maguire, Steyerm. & Wurdack) R.M.King & H.Rob.
- Ageratum candidum G.M.Barroso
- Ageratum chiriquense (B.L.Rob.) R.M.King & H.Rob.
- Ageratum chortianum Standl. & Steyerm.
- Ageratum conyzoides L.
- Ageratum corymbosum (S.F.Blake) L.O.Williams
- Ageratum corymbosum Zuccagni
- Ageratum echioides Hemsl.
- Ageratum elassocarpum S.F.Blake
- Ageratum ellipticum B.L.Rob.
- Ageratum fastigiatum (Gardner) R.M.King & H.Rob.
- Ageratum gaumeri B.L.Rob.
- Ageratum grossedentatum Rzed.
- Ageratum guatemalense M.F.Johnson
- Ageratum hondurense R.M.King & H.Rob.
- Ageratum houstonianum Mill.
- Ageratum iltisii R.M.King & H.Rob.
- Ageratum koulianum Bhellum
- Ageratum littorale A.Gray
- Ageratum lundellii R.M.King & H.Rob.
- Ageratum maritimum Kunth
- Ageratum microcarpum (Benth.) Hemsl.
- Ageratum microcephalum Hemsl.
- Ageratum molinae R.M.King & H.Rob.
- Ageratum munaense R.M.King & H.Rob.
- Ageratum myriadenium (Baker) R.M.King & H.Rob.
- Ageratum oerstedii B.L.Rob
- Ageratum paleaceum (J.Gay ex DC.) Hemsl.
- Ageratum peckii B.L.Rob
- Ageratum petiolatum (Hook. & Arn.) Hemsl.
- Ageratum platylepis (B.L.Rob.) R.M.King & H.Rob.
- Ageratum platypodum B.L.Rob
- Ageratum riparium B.L.Rob.
- Ageratum rugosum J.M.Coult.
- Ageratum salvanaturae B.Smalla & N.Kilian
- Ageratum scorpioideum Baker
- Ageratum solisii B.L.Turner
- Ageratum standleyi B.L.Rob
- Ageratum tehuacanum R.M.King & H.Rob.
- Ageratum tomentosum (Benth.) Hemsl.

Selected synonyms include:

- Ageratum altissimum L. – synonym of Ageratina altissima (L.) R.M.King & H.Rob.
- Ageratum anisochroma (Klatt) R.M.King & H.Rob. – synonym of Ageratina anisochroma (Klatt) R.M.King & H.Rob.
- Ageratum isocarphoides (DC.) Hemsl. – synonym of Ageratum echioides Hemsl.
- Ageratum lavenia (L.) Kuntze – synonym of Adenostemma lavenia (L.) Kuntze
- Ageratum lucidum B.L.Rob. – synonym of Ageratum corymbosum Zuccagni
- Ageratum meridanum V.M.Badillo – synonym of Ageratum microcarpum (Benth.) Hemsl.
- Ageratum nelsonii (B.L.Rob.) M.F.Johnson – synonym of Ageratum elassocarpum S.F.Blake
- Ageratum oliveri R.M.King & H.Rob. – synonym of Ageratum oerstedii B.L.Rob.
- Ageratum panamense B.L.Rob. – synonym of Ageratum riparium B.L.Rob.
- Ageratum pohlii (Baker) H.Rob. – synonym of Teixeiranthus pohlii (Baker) R.M.King & H.Rob.
- Ageratum radicans B.L.Rob. – synonym of Ageratum peckii B.L.Rob.
- Ageratum salicifolium Hemsl. – synonym of Ageratum corymbosum Zuccagni
- Ageratum stachyofolium B.L.Rob. – synonym of Paneroa stachyofolia (B.L.Rob.) E.E.Schill.

== Segregate genera ==
The genus Paneroa consists of one species, Paneroa stachyofolia, native to Oaxaca, which was first described in Ageratum but which seems to be more closely related to Conoclinium and Fleischmannia.
