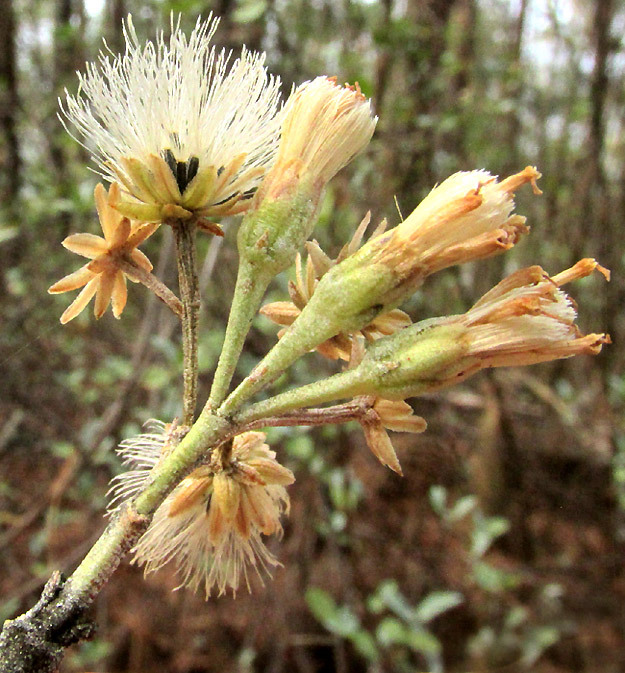
- Inflorescence

Scientific classification
- Kingdom: Plantae
- Clade: Tracheophytes
- Clade: Angiosperms
- Clade: Eudicots
- Clade: Asterids
- Order: Asterales
- Family: Asteraceae
- Genus: Ageratina
- Species: A. glabrata

Binomial name
- Ageratina glabrata (Kunth) R.M.King & H.Rob. 1970

Synonyms
- Eupatorium glabratum Kunth (1818); Ageratina modesta (Kunth) R.M.King & H.Rob. (1972); Eupatorium gonocladum DC. (1836); Eupatorium modestum Kunth (1847); Eupatorium piperitum Sessé & Moc. (1894); Eupatorium xalapense Kunth (1818)

= Ageratina glabrata =

Species of plant

Ageratina glabrata is a flowering plant belonging to the family Asteraceae.

== Description ==
Ageratina glabrata displays these main distinguishing features:

- It is a woody shrub up to 2.4 meters tall (~8 feet).
- Its leaves, arising in pairs opposite one another, are longer than wide, with a pointed tip, and margins which are toothed to almost smooth.
- Blades are hairless and somewhat resiny-shiny, with the lower surface dotted with glands; leaf texture ranges from thin to somewhat leathery.
- Flowers are arranged in heads consisting only of 15-18 disk florets with cylindrical corollas; the heads are arranged in cyme-type inflorescences.
- Corollas are white, sometimes with pinkish lobes, and up to about 7 mm long ( 3/16 inch).
- The fruit is a one-seeded, non-splitting, "cypsela" with a pappus almost as long as the corolla.

== Taxonomy ==
In 1970 when R.M. King and H. Robinson established the taxon Ageratina glabrata, they did so by reassigning the taxon Eupatorium glabratum, along with dozens of other Eupatorium species, to the preexisting genus Ageratina, creating Ageratina glabrata. Mostly they based their genus transfer on floral anatomy and the cytological evidence that among Ageratina species, as they conceived of the genus, the haploid chromosome number was n = 17.

In 1818, Ageratina glabrata was described – under the basionym Eupatorium glabratum – by Carl Sigismund Kunth based on a collection by Alexander von Humboldt and Aimé Bonpland encountered between Omitlan and "Real del Monte", today known as Mineral del Monte, both in the Mexican state of Hidalgo. The type specimen was collected at an elevation of "1300 hex." as expressed in Kunth's 19th-century Latin. The hex. stands for hexapoda, the Latin designation for the French unit of length at that time known as the toise; 1300 hex. converts to about 2534 meters (~8300 feet).

=== Etymology ===
The genus name Ageratina is based on another genus, Ageratum, plus the Latin diminutive suffix ina. Species in the two genera are very similar and dozens of species have been reassigned from Ageratum into Ageratina.

The species epithet glabrata is based on the Latin glaber meaning 'smooth, bald', likely referring to the species' hairless leaves. In 1818, Kunth formally described the leaves of the type specimen as "... subcarosa, glabra...", suggesting the name glabratum.

== Distribution ==
Ageratina glabrata is endemic to Mexico, from the northern states of Sinaloa, Durango and Tamaulipas south to Oaxaca and Puebla.

== Habitat ==
Ageratina glabrata occurs in forests in which fir trees occur, oak and pine forests, and mesophytic forests at elevations of 2600-3500 meters (~8550-11,500 feet). It is described as abundant in the understory of managed temperate forests in central Mexico.

== Ecology ==
Ageratina glabrata has a continuous flowering pattern throughout the year. Relative to closely related species, its greater height and cover suggest an adaptation to open environments.

== In traditional medicine ==
In Mexico, Ageratina glabrata is considered to have analgesic activity; one of its names is hierba del golpe, which can be translated loosely as 'plant for hits'. Preliminary results of controlled tests with rats using the "hot plate"and "tail flick tests" suggested that treatment with extracts of the plant provided analgesic effects for 5 hours after its administration.

Another study, noting the shrub's traditional use for stomach pain and for postpartum baths, found that Ageratina glabrata contains antioxidants that might explain the usefulness.

== Gallery ==
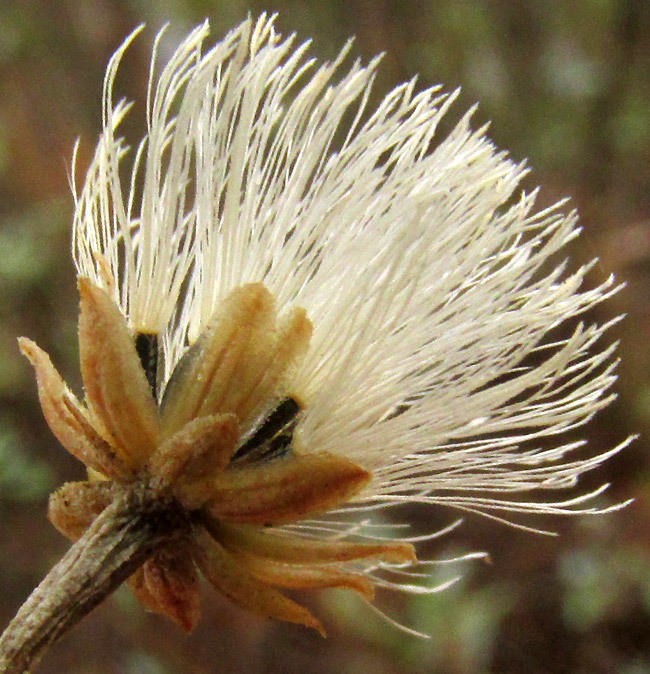
Ageratina glabrata, fruiting head with involucral bracts

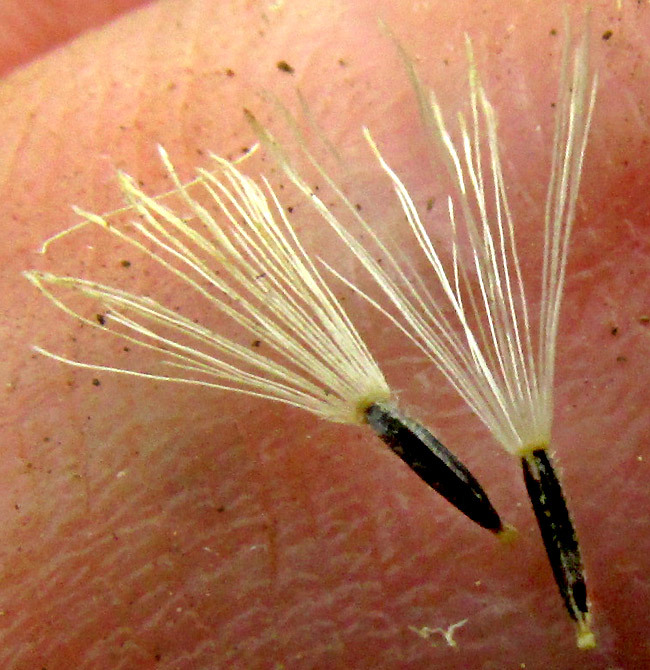
Ageratina glabrata, ridged cypselae with pappuses

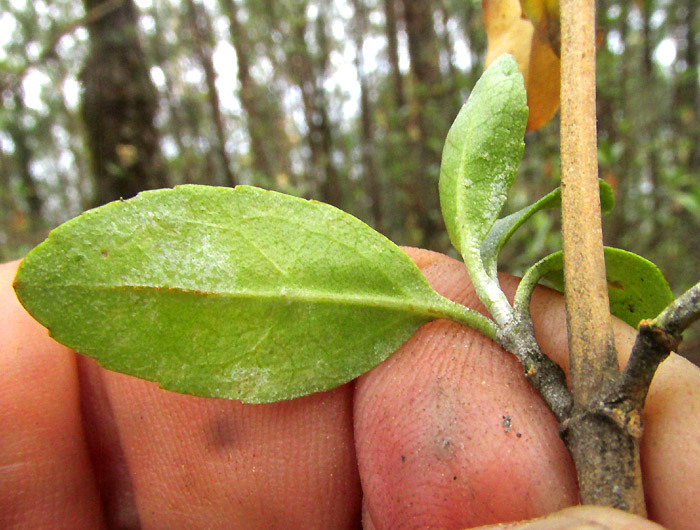
Ageratina glabrata, hairless leaves resiny and glandular below

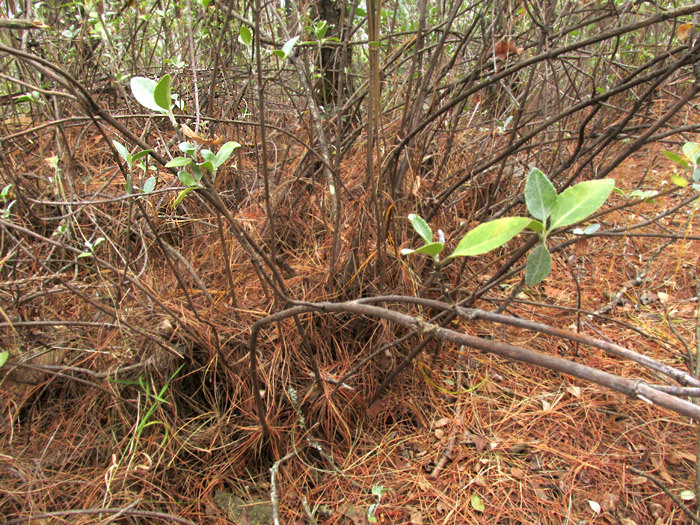
Ageratina glabrata, much branched at base

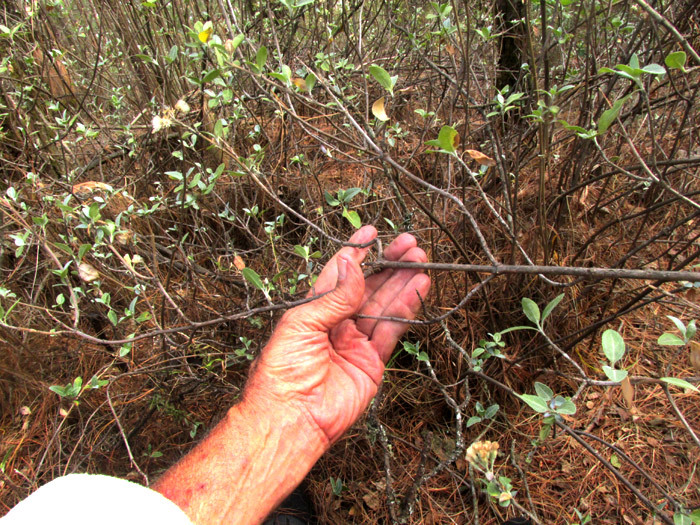
Ageratina glabrata, leafy branches difusely branched
