= Ageratina macbridei =

Conservation status
- Least Concern (IUCN 2.3)

Scientific classification
- Kingdom: Plantae
- Clade: Tracheophytes
- Clade: Angiosperms
- Clade: Eudicots
- Clade: Asterids
- Order: Asterales
- Family: Asteraceae
- Genus: Ageratina
- Species: A. macbridei

Binomial name
- Ageratina macbridei (B.L.Rob.) R.M.King & H.Rob

Synonyms
- Eupatorium macbridei B.L.Rob.

Species of plant

Ageratina macbridei is a species of flowering plant in the family Asteraceae. It is endemic to Peru, where it occurs in several types of habitats, often near rivers.

== Etymology ==
Ageratina is derived from Greek meaning 'un-aging', in reference to the flowers keeping their color for a long time. This name was used by Dioscorides for a number of different plants.
