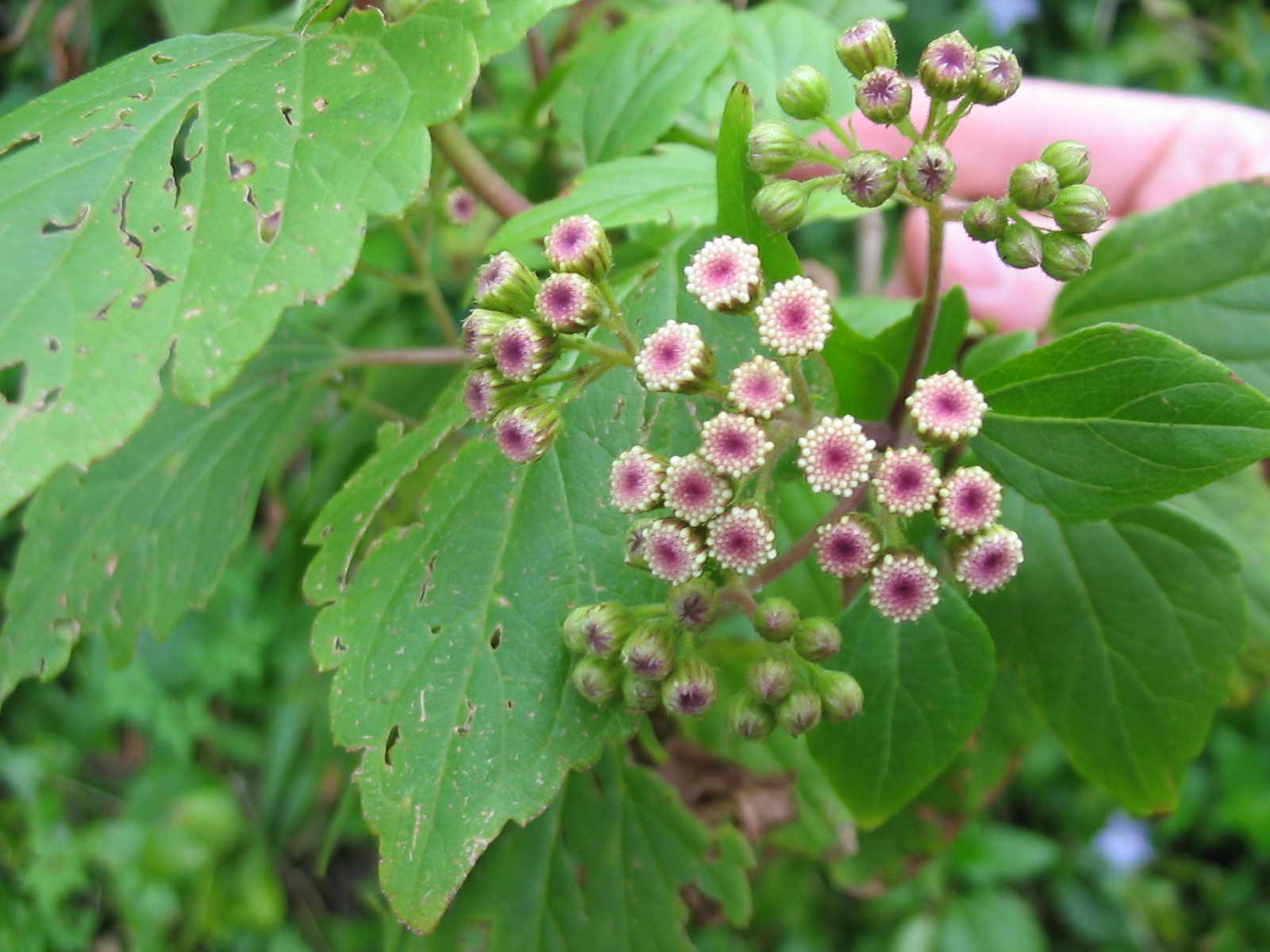
- Sticky snakeroot (Ageratina adenophora)

Scientific classification
- Kingdom: Plantae
- Clade: Tracheophytes
- Clade: Angiosperms
- Clade: Eudicots
- Clade: Asterids
- Order: Asterales
- Family: Asteraceae
- Subfamily: Asteroideae
- Tribe: Eupatorieae
- Genus: Ageratina; Spach

Species
- 322; see text.

Synonyms
- Batschia Moench, nom. illeg.; Bustamenta Alamán ex DC.; Kyrstenia Neck. ex Greene; Mallinoa J.M.Coult.; Pachythamnus (R.M.King & H.Rob.) R.M.King & H.Rob.; Piptothrix A.Gray

= Ageratina =

Genus of flowering plants

Ageratina, commonly known as snakeroot, is a genus of over 300 species of perennials and rounded shrubs in the family Asteraceae.

These plants grow mainly in the warmer regions of the Americas and West Indies. Over 150 species are native to Mexico. Some flourish in the cooler areas of the eastern United States. Two Mexican species have become a pest in parts of Australia and Taiwan. Ageratina used to belong to the genus Eupatorium, but it has been reclassified.

The genus name Ageratina means "like Ageratum" and consists of Ageratum and -ina, the feminine form of the Latin adjectival suffix -inus.

== Description ==
The inflorescence consists of multiple fluffy, red or pinkish-white capitula in clusters. These lack the typical ray flowers of the composites.

They have multiple, much-branched woody stems. The petioles are rather long. The leaves are triangular, serrate and opposite with a foul-smelling, musky scent.

== Species ==
As of May 2024, Plants of the World online accepted 315 species:

- Ageratina acevedoana B.L.Turner
- Ageratina acevedoi H.Rob.
- Ageratina adenophora (Spreng.) R.M.King & H.Rob.
- Ageratina adenophoroides H.Rob.
- Ageratina aegirophylla (B.L.Rob.) R.M.King & H.Rob.
- Ageratina altissima (L.) R.M.King & H.Rob.
- Ageratina amblyolepis (B.L.Rob.) R.M.King & H.Rob.
- Ageratina ampla (Benth.) R.M.King & H.Rob.
- Ageratina anchistea (Grashoff & Beaman) R.M.King & H.Rob.
- Ageratina angustifolia (Kunth) R.M.King & H.Rob.
- Ageratina anisochroma (Klatt) R.M.King & H.Rob.
- Ageratina apollinairei (B.L.Rob.) R.M.King & H.Rob.
- Ageratina appendiculata V.M.Badillo
- Ageratina aracaiensis V.M.Badillo
- Ageratina arbutifolia (Benth.) R.M.King & H.Rob.
- Ageratina areolaris (DC.) D.Gage ex B.L.Turner
- Ageratina aristeguietii R.M.King & H.Rob.
- Ageratina aristei (B.L.Rob.) R.M.King & H.Rob.
- Ageratina aromatica (L.) Spach
- Ageratina arsenei (B.L.Rob.) R.M.King & H.Rob.
- Ageratina asclepiadea (L.f.) R.M.King & H.Rob.
- Ageratina astellera (B.L.Turner) B.L.Turner
- Ageratina atrocordata (B.L.Rob.) R.M.King & H.Rob.
- Ageratina austin-smithii R.M.King & H.Rob.
- Ageratina ayerscottiana B.L.Turner
- Ageratina baccharoides (Kunth) R.M.King & H.Rob.
- Ageratina badia (Klatt) R.M.King & H.Rob.
- Ageratina barclayae R.M.King & H.Rob.
- Ageratina barriei B.L.Turner
- Ageratina beamanii B.L.Turner
- Ageratina bellidifolia (Benth.) R.M.King & H.Rob.
- Ageratina bishopii R.M.King & H.Rob.
- Ageratina blepharilepis (Sch.Bip.) R.M.King & H.Rob.
- Ageratina bobjansenii B.L.Turner
- Ageratina boekei R.M.King & H.Rob.
- Ageratina boyacensis R.M.King & H.Rob.
- Ageratina brandegeana (B.L.Rob.) R.M.King & H.Rob.
- Ageratina brevipes (DC.) R.M.King & H.Rob.
- Ageratina bustamenta (DC.) R.M.King & H.Rob.
- Ageratina caeciliae (B.L.Rob.) R.M.King & H.Rob.
- Ageratina calaminthifolia (Kunth) R.M.King & H.Rob.
- Ageratina calophylla (Greene) R.M.King & H.Rob.
- Ageratina campii H.Rob.
- Ageratina campylocladia (B.L.Rob.) R.M.King & H.Rob.
- Ageratina capazica V.M.Badillo
- Ageratina capillipes R.M.King & H.Rob.
- Ageratina cardiophylla (B.L.Rob.) R.M.King & H.Rob.
- Ageratina carmonis (Standl. & Steyerm.) R.M.King & H.Rob.
- Ageratina cartagoensis R.M.King & H.Rob.
- Ageratina celestini (Cuatrec.) R.M.King & H.Rob.
- Ageratina cerifera (McVaugh) R.M.King & H.Rob.
- Ageratina chachapoyasensis (Cuatrec.) R.M.King & H.Rob.
- Ageratina chazaroana B.L.Turner
- Ageratina chimalapana B.L.Turner
- Ageratina chiriquensis (B.L.Rob.) R.M.King & H.Rob.
- Ageratina choricephala (B.L.Rob.) R.M.King & H.Rob.
- Ageratina choricephaloides (B.L.Rob.) R.M.King & H.Rob.
- Ageratina colimana B.L.Turner
- Ageratina collodes (B.L.Rob. & Greenm.) R.M.King & H.Rob.
- Ageratina concordiana B.L.Turner
- Ageratina contigua R.M.King & H.Rob.
- Ageratina contorta (C.D.Adams) R.M.King & H.Rob.
- Ageratina corylifolia (Griseb.) R.M.King & H.Rob.
- Ageratina costaricensis R.M.King & H.Rob.
- Ageratina crassiceps (B.L.Rob.) R.M.King & H.Rob.
- Ageratina crassiramea (B.L.Rob.) R.M.King & H.Rob.
- Ageratina cremastra (B.L.Rob.) R.M.King & H.Rob.
- Ageratina cronquistii R.M.King & H.Rob.
- Ageratina cruzii B.L.Turner
- Ageratina cuatrecasasii R.M.King & H.Rob.
- Ageratina cuencana (B.L.Rob.) R.M.King & H.Rob.
- Ageratina cuicatlana B.L.Turner
- Ageratina cumbensis H.Rob.
- Ageratina cutervensis (Hieron.) R.M.King & H.Rob.
- Ageratina cuzcoensis (Hieron.) R.M.King & H.Rob.
- Ageratina cylindrica (McVaugh) R.M.King & H.Rob.
- Ageratina dasyneura (B.L.Rob.) R.M.King & H.Rob.
- Ageratina davidsei R.M.King & H.Rob.
- Ageratina deltoidea (Jacq.) R.M.King & H.Rob.
- Ageratina desquamans (B.L.Rob.) R.M.King & H.Rob.
- Ageratina dictyoneura (Urb.) R.M.King & H.Rob.
- Ageratina dillonii H.Rob.
- Ageratina diversipila R.M.King & H.Rob.
- Ageratina dolichobasis (McVaugh) R.M.King & H.Rob.
- Ageratina dombeyana (DC.) R.M.King & H.Rob.
- Ageratina dorrii V.M.Badillo
- Ageratina eleazarii Rzed.
- Ageratina elegans (Kunth) R.M.King & H.Rob.
- Ageratina enixa (B.L.Rob.) R.M.King & H.Rob.
- Ageratina espinosarum (A.Gray) R.M.King & H.Rob.
- Ageratina etlana B.L.Turner
- Ageratina etlensis (B.L.Rob.) R.M.King & H.Rob.
- Ageratina ewanii H.Rob.
- Ageratina fastigiata (Kunth) R.M.King & H.Rob.
- Ageratina feuereri H.Rob.
- Ageratina flaviseta (B.L.Rob.) R.M.King & H.Rob.
- Ageratina fleischmannioides H.Rob.
- Ageratina flourensifolia (B.L.Turner) R.M.King & H.Rob.
- Ageratina funckii (B.L.Rob.) R.M.King & H.Rob.
- Ageratina geminata (McVaugh) R.M.King & H.Rob.
- Ageratina gentryana B.L.Turner
- Ageratina gilbertii (B.L.Rob.) R.M.King & H.Rob.
- Ageratina glabrata (Kunth) R.M.King & H.Rob.
- Ageratina glandulifera (Hieron.) R.M.King & H.Rob.
- Ageratina glauca (Sch.Bip. ex Klatt) R.M.King & H.Rob.
- Ageratina glechonophylla (Less.) R.M.King & H.Rob.
- Ageratina glischra (B.L.Rob.) R.M.King & H.Rob.
- Ageratina gloeoclada (B.L.Rob.) R.M.King & H.Rob.
- Ageratina glyptophlebia (B.L.Rob.) R.M.King & H.Rob.
- Ageratina gonzalezorum B.L.Turner
- Ageratina gracilenta (B.L.Rob.) R.M.King & H.Rob.
- Ageratina gracilis (Kunth) R.M.King & H.Rob.
- Ageratina grandifolia (Regel) R.M.King & H.Rob.
- Ageratina grashoffii B.L.Turner
- Ageratina guatemalensis R.M.King & H.Rob.
- Ageratina gynoxoides (Wedd.) R.M.King & H.Rob.
- Ageratina gypsophila B.L.Turner
- Ageratina halbertiana (McVaugh) R.M.King & H.Rob.
- Ageratina harlingii H.Rob.
- Ageratina hartii (Urb.) R.M.King & H.Rob.
- Ageratina hasegawana B.L.Turner
- Ageratina havanensis (Kunth) R.M.King & H.Rob.
- Ageratina hederifolia (A.Gray) R.M.King & H.Rob.
- Ageratina helenae R.M.King & H.Rob.
- Ageratina henzium B.L.Turner
- Ageratina herbacea (A.Gray) R.M.King & H.Rob.
- Ageratina hernandezii B.L.Turner
- Ageratina hidalgensis (B.L.Rob.) R.M.King & H.Rob.
- Ageratina hirtella R.M.King & H.Rob.
- Ageratina huahuapana B.L.Turner
- Ageratina huehueteca (Standl. & Steyerm.) R.M.King & H.Rob.
- Ageratina humochica B.L.Turner
- Ageratina hyssopina (A.Gray) R.M.King & H.Rob.
- Ageratina ibaguensis (Sch.Bip. ex Hieron.) R.M.King & H.Rob.
- Ageratina ilicifolia B.L.Turner
- Ageratina illita (Urb.) R.M.King & H.Rob.
- Ageratina iltisii B.L.Turner
- Ageratina infiernillensis R.M.King & H.Rob.
- Ageratina intercostulata (B.L.Rob.) R.M.King & H.Rob.
- Ageratina intibucensis R.M.King & H.Rob.
- Ageratina irrasa (B.L.Rob.) R.M.King & H.Rob.
- Ageratina isolepis (B.L.Rob.) R.M.King & H.Rob.
- Ageratina jahnii (B.L.Rob.) R.M.King & H.Rob.
- Ageratina jaliscensis (B.L.Rob.) D.Gage ex B.L.Turner
- Ageratina jalpana B.L.Turner
- Ageratina jalpanserra B.L.Turner
- Ageratina jocotepecana B.L.Turner
- Ageratina josepaneroi B.L.Turner
- Ageratina josephensis Rodr.-Cabeza & S.Díaz
- Ageratina jucunda (Greene) Clewell & Wooten
- Ageratina juxtlahuacensis Panero & Villaseñor
- Ageratina killipii H.Rob.
- Ageratina kochiana B.L.Turner
- Ageratina kupperi (Suess.) R.M.King & H.Rob.
- Ageratina lapsensis B.L.Turner
- Ageratina lasia (B.L.Rob.) R.M.King & H.Rob.
- Ageratina lasioneura (Hook. & Arn.) R.M.King & H.Rob.
- Ageratina latipes (Benth.) R.M.King & H.Rob.
- Ageratina leiocarpa (B.L.Rob.) D.Gage ex B.L.Turner
- Ageratina lemmonii (B.L.Rob.) R.M.King & H.Rob.
- Ageratina leptodictyon (A.Gray) R.M.King & H.Rob.
- Ageratina liebmannii (Sch.Bip. ex Klatt) R.M.King & H.Rob.
- Ageratina ligustrina (DC.) R.M.King & H.Rob.
- Ageratina lobulifera (B.L.Rob.) R.M.King & H.Rob.
- Ageratina lopez-mirandae R.M.King & H.Rob.
- Ageratina lorentzii (Hieron.) R.M.King & H.Rob.
- Ageratina luciae-brauniae (Fernald) R.M.King & H.Rob.
- Ageratina lucida (Ortega) R.M.King & H.Rob.
- Ageratina macbridei (B.L.Rob.) R.M.King & H.Rob.
- Ageratina macdonaldii B.L.Turner
- Ageratina macvaughii R.M.King & H.Rob.
- Ageratina mairetiana (DC.) R.M.King & H.Rob.
- Ageratina malacolepis (B.L.Rob.) R.M.King & H.Rob.
- Ageratina manantlana B.L.Turner
- Ageratina maranonii H.Rob.
- Ageratina markporteri B.L.Turner
- Ageratina mayajana B.L.Turner
- Ageratina mazatecana B.L.Turner
- Ageratina megacephala B.L.Turner
- Ageratina megaphylla B.L.Turner
- Ageratina miahuatlana B.L.Turner
- Ageratina microcephala B.L.Turner
- Ageratina miquihuana (B.L.Turner) R.M.King & H.Rob.
- Ageratina molinae R.M.King & H.Rob.
- Ageratina moorei B.L.Turner
- Ageratina mortoniana (Alain) R.M.King & H.Rob.
- Ageratina muelleri (Sch.Bip. ex Klatt) R.M.King & H.Rob.
- Ageratina mutiscuensis (B.L.Rob.) R.M.King & H.Rob.
- Ageratina neblinensis J.Montoya, E.Linares, Torres Marq., Vicente Orell.
- Ageratina neohintonorium B.L.Turner
- Ageratina neriifolia (B.L.Rob.) R.M.King & H.Rob.
- Ageratina nesomii B.L.Turner
- Ageratina nubicola Pruski & Clase
- Ageratina oaxacana (Klatt) R.M.King & H.Rob.
- Ageratina ocanensis (B.L.Rob.) R.M.King & H.Rob.
- Ageratina occidentalis (Hook.)R.M.King & H.Rob.
- Ageratina oligocephala (DC.) R.M.King & H.Rob.
- Ageratina oppositifolia (A.Gray) B.L.Turner
- Ageratina oreithales (Greenm.) B.L.Turner
- Ageratina ovilla (Standl. & Steyerm.) R.M.King & H.Rob.
- Ageratina ozolotepecana B.L.Turner
- Ageratina palmeri (A.Gray) B.L.Turner
- Ageratina pampalcensis (B.L.Rob.) R.M.King & H.Rob.
- Ageratina paramensis (Aristeg.) R.M.King & H.Rob.
- Ageratina parayana (Espinosa) B.L.Turner
- Ageratina parviceps H.Rob.
- Ageratina paucibracteata (Alain) R.M.King & H.Rob.
- Ageratina pauciflora B.L.Turner
- Ageratina paupercula (A.Gray) R.M.King & H.Rob.
- Ageratina pazcuarensis (Kunth) R.M.King & H.Rob.
- Ageratina pelotropha (B.L.Rob.) R.M.King & H.Rob.
- Ageratina pendula Panero & Villaseñor
- Ageratina pentlandiana (DC.) R.M.King & H.Rob.
- Ageratina perezii B.L.Turner
- Ageratina persetosa H.Rob.
- Ageratina petiolaris (Moc. & Sessé ex DC.) R.M.King & H.Rob.
- Ageratina photina (B.L.Rob.) R.M.King & H.Rob.
- Ageratina pichinchensis (Kunth) R.M.King & H.Rob.
- Ageratina pochutlana B.L.Turner
- Ageratina popayanensis (Hieron.) R.M.King & H.Rob.
- Ageratina potosina B.L.Turner
- Ageratina pringlei (B.L.Rob. & Greenm.) R.M.King & H.Rob.
- Ageratina proba (N.E.Br.) R.M.King & H.Rob.
- Ageratina prunellifolia (Kunth) R.M.King & H.Rob.
- Ageratina prunifolia (Kunth) R.M.King & H.Rob.
- Ageratina pseudochilca (Benth.) R.M.King & H.Rob.
- Ageratina pseudogracilis H.Rob.
- Ageratina psilodora (B.L.Rob.) R.M.King & H.Rob.
- Ageratina queretaroana B.L.Turner
- Ageratina ramireziorum (J.Espinosa) B.L.Turner
- Ageratina ramonensis (B.L.Rob.) R.M.King & H.Rob.
- Ageratina rangelii H.Rob.
- Ageratina regalis H.Rob.
- Ageratina resiniflua H.Rob.
- Ageratina resiniflua (Urb.) R.M.King & H.Rob.
- Ageratina reticulifora (Standl. & L.O.Williams) R.M.King & H.Rob.
- Ageratina rhodopappa (B.L.Rob.) R.M.King & H.Rob.
- Ageratina rhodopoda (B.L.Rob.) R.M.King & H.Rob.
- Ageratina rhomboidea (Kunth) R.M.King & H.Rob.
- Ageratina rhypodes (B.L.Rob.) R.M.King & H.Rob.
- Ageratina rhytidodes (B.L.Rob.) R.M.King & H.Rob.
- Ageratina riparia (Regel) R.M.King & H.Rob.
- Ageratina riskindii B.L.Turner
- Ageratina rivalis (Greenm.) R.M.King & H.Rob.
- Ageratina roanensis (Small) E.E.Lamont
- Ageratina robinsoniana (Greene) B.L.Turner
- Ageratina roraimensis (N.E.Br.) R.M.King & H.Rob.
- Ageratina rosei H.Rob.
- Ageratina rothrockii (A.Gray) R.M.King & H.Rob.
- Ageratina rubicaulis (Kunth) R.M.King & H.Rob.
- Ageratina rupicola (B.L.Rob. & Greenm.) R.M.King & H.Rob.
- Ageratina salicifolia R.M.King & H.Rob.
- Ageratina saltillensis (B.L.Rob.) R.M.King & H.Rob.
- Ageratina salvadorensis R.M.King & H.Rob.
- Ageratina sandersii B.L.Turner
- Ageratina saxorum (Standl. & Steyerm.) R.M.King & H.Rob.
- Ageratina schaffneri (Sch.Bip. ex B.L.Rob.) R.M.King & H.Rob.
- Ageratina scopulorum (Wedd.) R.M.King & H.Rob.
- Ageratina scorodonioides (A.Gray) R.M.King & H.Rob.
- Ageratina seleri B.L.Turner
- Ageratina serboana B.L.Turner
- Ageratina serrulata H.Rob.
- Ageratina shastensis (D.W.Taylor & Stebbins) R.M.King & H.Rob.
- Ageratina simulans (B.L.Rob.) R.M.King & H.Rob.
- Ageratina sodiroi (Hieron.) R.M.King & H.Rob.
- Ageratina soejimana B.L.Turner
- Ageratina solana B.L.Turner
- Ageratina sotarensis (Hieron.) R.M.King & H.Rob.
- Ageratina sousae B.L.Turner
- Ageratina spooneri B.L.Turner
- Ageratina standleyi R.M.King & H.Rob.
- Ageratina sternbergiana (DC.) R.M.King & H.Rob.
- Ageratina stictophylla (B.L.Rob.) R.M.King & H.Rob.
- Ageratina stricta (A.Gray) R.M.King & H.Rob.
- Ageratina subcoriacea R.M.King & H.Rob.
- Ageratina subferruginea (B.L.Rob.) R.M.King & H.Rob.
- Ageratina subinclusa (Klatt) R.M.King & H.Rob.
- Ageratina sundbergii B.L.Turner
- Ageratina tambillensis (Hieron.) R.M.King & H.Rob.
- Ageratina tarmensis (B.L.Rob.) R.M.King & H.Rob.
- Ageratina tejalapana B.L.Turner
- Ageratina tenuis (R.E.Fr.) R.M.King & H.Rob.
- Ageratina textitlana B.L.Turner
- Ageratina theifolia (Benth.) R.M.King & H.Rob.
- Ageratina thyrsiflora (Greene) R.M.King & H.Rob.
- Ageratina tinifolia (Kunth) R.M.King & H.Rob.
- Ageratina tomentella (Schrad.) R.M.King & H.Rob.
- Ageratina tonduzii (Klatt) R.M.King & H.Rob.
- Ageratina tovarae H.Rob.
- Ageratina trianae H.Rob.
- Ageratina triangulata (Alamán ex DC.) B.L.Turner
- Ageratina triniona (McVaugh) R.M.King & H.Rob.
- Ageratina tristis (DC.) R.M.King & H.Rob.
- Ageratina urbani (Ekman ex Urb.) R.M.King & H.Rob.
- Ageratina vacciniifolia (Benth.) R.M.King & H.Rob.
- Ageratina vallincola (DC.) R.M.King & H.Rob.
- Ageratina venulosa (A.Gray) R.M.King & H.Rob.
- Ageratina vernalis (Vatke & Kurtz) R.M.King & H.Rob.
- Ageratina vernicosa (Sch.Bip. ex Greenm.) R.M.King & H.Rob.
- Ageratina viburnoides (DC.) R.M.King & H.Rob.
- Ageratina viejoana B.L.Turner
- Ageratina villarrealii B.L.Turner
- Ageratina villonacoensis H.Rob.
- Ageratina viscosa (Kunth) R.M.King & H.Rob.
- Ageratina viscosissima (Rolfe) R.M.King & H.Rob.
- Ageratina warnockii B.L.Turner
- Ageratina websteri H.Rob.
- Ageratina wrightii (A.Gray) R.M.King & H.Rob.
- Ageratina wurdackii R.M.King & H.Rob.
- Ageratina yaharana B.L.Turner
- Ageratina yecorana B.L.Turner
- Ageratina zapalinama B.L.Turner
- Ageratina zaragozana B.L.Turner
- Ageratina zinniifolia (B.L.Rob.) R.M.King & H.Rob.
- Ageratina zunilana (Standl. & Steyerm.) R.M.King & H.Rob.

Selected synonyms:

- Ageratina conspicua R.M.King & H.Rob. — synonym of Ageratina grandifolia (Regel) R.M.King & H.Rob.
- Ageratina dendroides (Spreng.) R.M.King & H.Rob. — synonym of Raulinoreitzia crenulata (Spreng.) R.M.King & H.Rob.

== Toxicity ==
Milk from cows that have eaten snakeroot can cause illness if ingested because the milk becomes toxic. Symptoms of milk sickness include vomiting.

== Medicinal use ==
Ageratina pichinchensis is a traditional Mexican treatment for superficial fungal infections of the skin. These plant extracts contain encecalin which has activity to inhibit and kill the fungus. Studies have compared its effectiveness in treating toenail fungus with ciclopirox.

In India, Snakeroot refers to another species called "Rauvolfia serpentina", long used to treat snakebite, epilepsy, mental disorders. It was also discovered to be useful in regulating hypertension discovered in 1949, but it causes various side effects. Used to treat schizophrenia due to the alkaloid reserpine it contains.
