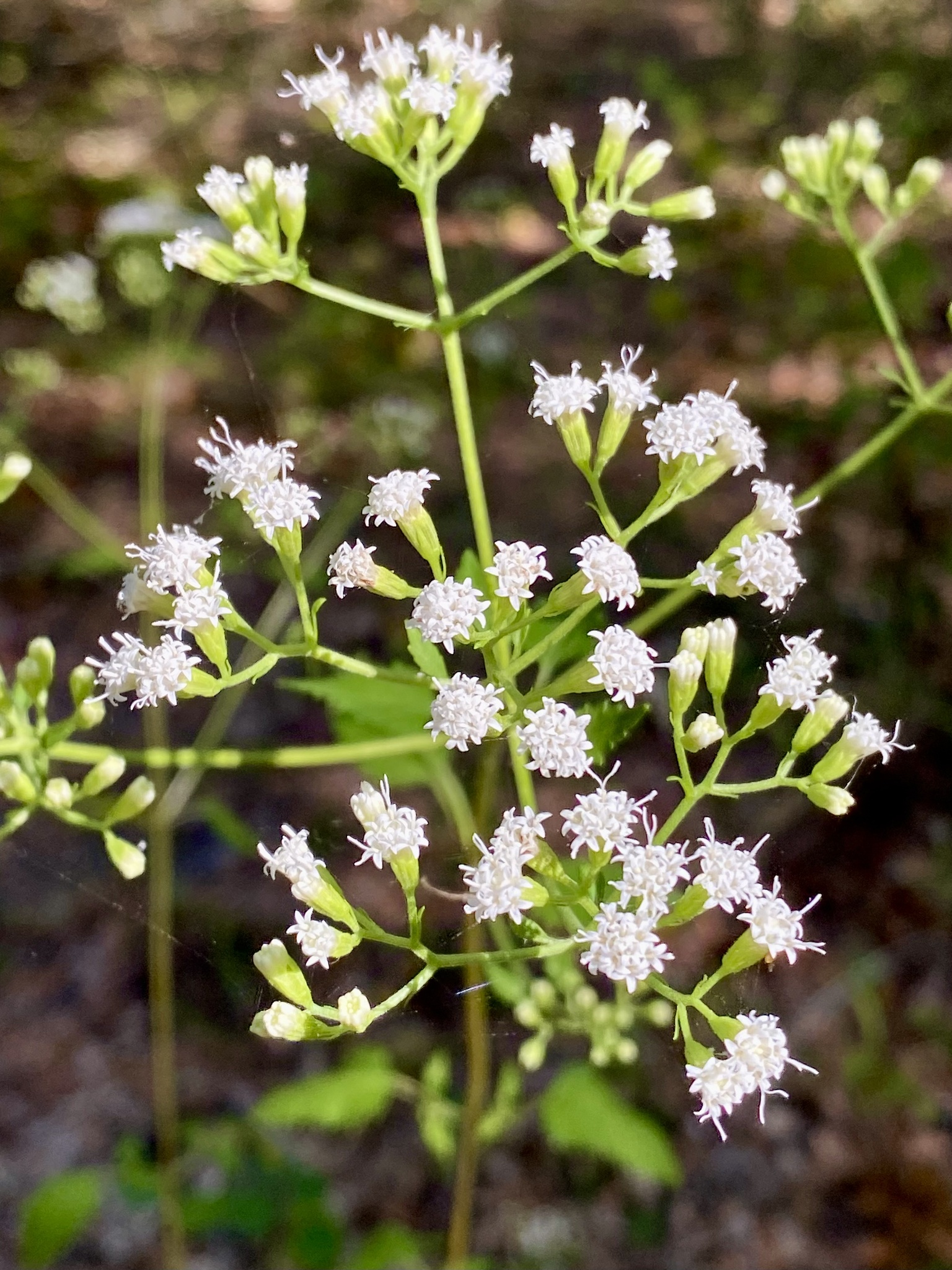

Conservation status
- Apparently Secure (NatureServe)

Scientific classification
- Kingdom: Plantae
- Clade: Tracheophytes
- Clade: Angiosperms
- Clade: Eudicots
- Clade: Asterids
- Order: Asterales
- Family: Asteraceae
- Genus: Ageratina
- Species: A. jucunda

Binomial name
- Ageratina jucunda (Greene) Clewell & Wooten

Synonyms
- Ageratina aromatica var. incisa (A.Gray) C.F.Reed; Eupatorium aromaticum var. incisum A.Gray; Eupatorium incisum (A.Gray) Chapm. 1897 not Rich. 1792 nor Griseb. 1866; Eupatorium jucundum Greene; Eupatorium suaveolens Chapm. 1878 not Kunth 1818 nor Wall. 1831; Kyrstenia jucunda (Greene) Greene

= Ageratina jucunda =

Species of flowering plant

Ageratina jucunda, called the Hammock snakeroot, is a North American species of plants in the family Asteraceae. Found only in the southeastern United States in the states of Georgia and Florida, it is a perennial herb growing up to 3 ft (0.91 m) tall.

== Etymology ==
Ageratina is derived from Greek meaning 'un-aging', in reference to the flowers keeping their color for a long time. This name was used by Dioscorides for a number of different plants.
