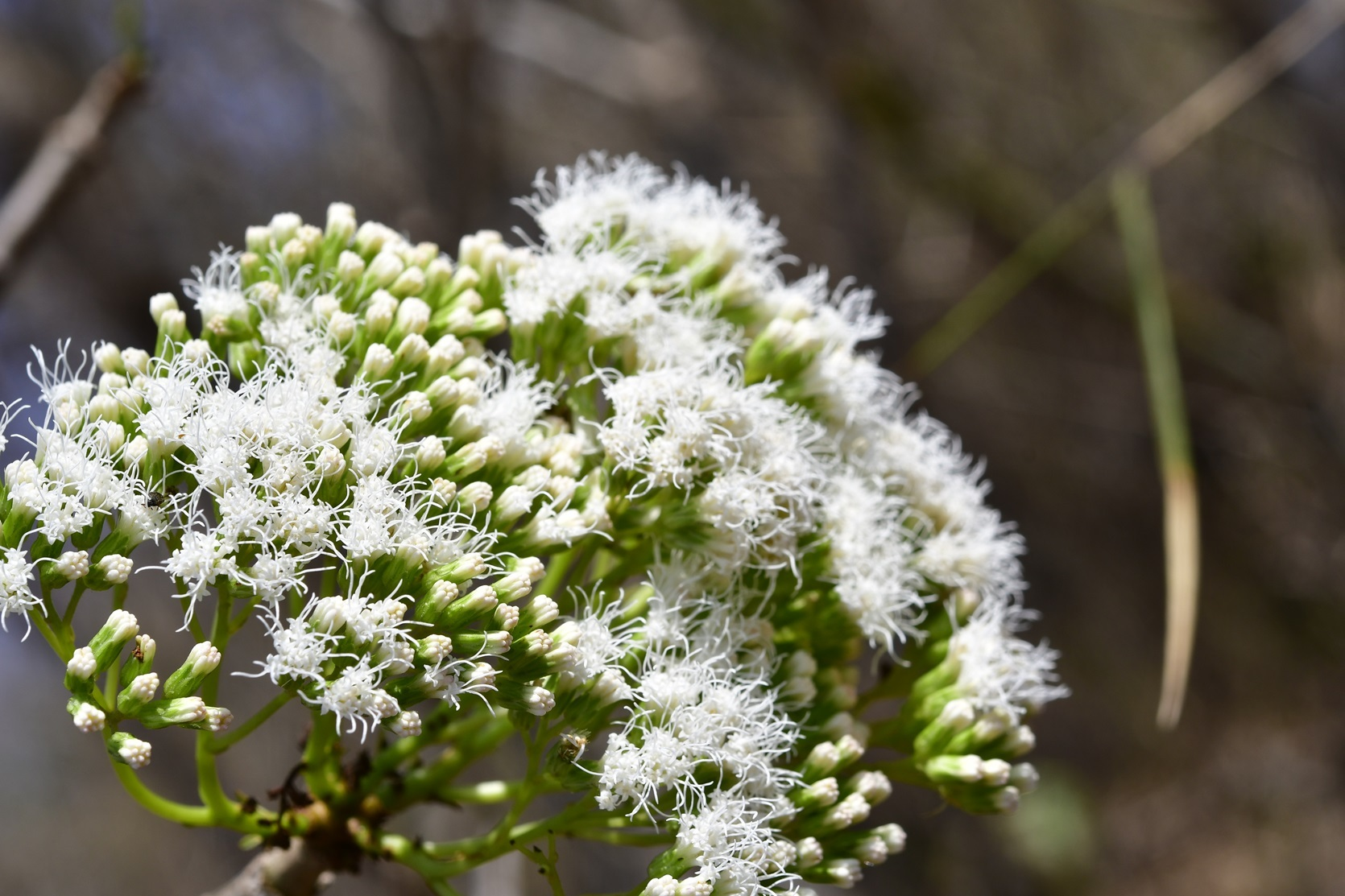

Scientific classification
- Kingdom: Plantae
- Clade: Tracheophytes
- Clade: Angiosperms
- Clade: Eudicots
- Clade: Asterids
- Order: Asterales
- Family: Asteraceae
- Genus: Ageratina
- Species: A. crassiramea

Binomial name
- Ageratina crassiramea (B.L.Rob.) R.M.King & H.Rob.

Synonyms
- Eupatorium crassirameum B.L.Rob.; Pachythamnus crassirameus (B.L.Rob.) R.M.King & H.Rob.

= Ageratina crassiramea =

Species of plant

Ageratina crassiramea is a species of flowering plant in the family Asteraceae, native to central and southern Mexico through Central America to Nicaragua. It was first described by Benjamin Lincoln Robinson in 1900 as Eupatorium crassirameum.
