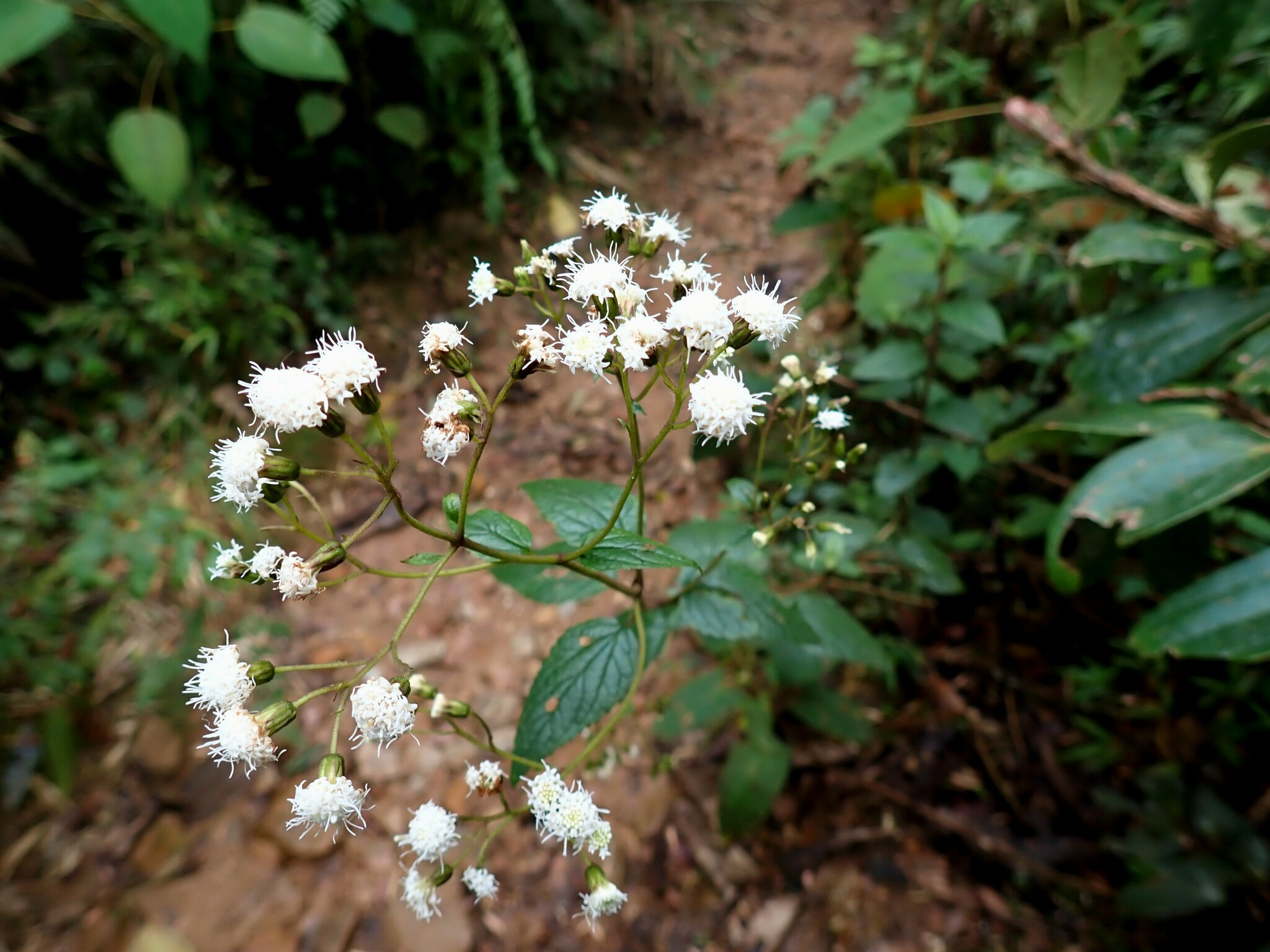

Scientific classification
- Kingdom: Plantae
- Clade: Tracheophytes
- Clade: Angiosperms
- Clade: Eudicots
- Clade: Asterids
- Order: Asterales
- Family: Asteraceae
- Genus: Ageratina
- Species: A. gracilis

Binomial name
- Ageratina gracilis (Kunth) R.M.King & H.Rob.

= Ageratina gracilis =

Species of plant

Ageratina gracilis is a plant in the family Asteraceae, native to South America.

== Range ==
Ageratina gracilis is native to Colombia, Ecuador, and Venezuela, where it grows in mountains at elevations from 1700 to 4100 meters.

== Ecology ==
Ageratina gracilis disperses its seeds by wind and is short-term persistent in the soil seed bank.

== Uses ==
Ageratina gracilis has been investigated for possible anti-cancer properties.
