= Ageratina lemmonii =

Conservation status
- Imperiled (NatureServe)

Scientific classification
- Kingdom: Plantae
- Clade: Tracheophytes
- Clade: Angiosperms
- Clade: Eudicots
- Clade: Asterids
- Order: Asterales
- Family: Asteraceae
- Genus: Ageratina
- Species: A. lemmonii

Binomial name
- Ageratina lemmonii (B.L.Rob.) R.M.King & H.Rob.

Synonyms
- Eupatorium euonymifolium Greene; Eupatorium lemmonii B.L.Rob.; Eupatorium lemmoni B.L.Rob.; Kyrstenia euonymyfolia (Greene) Greene

Species of flowering plant

Ageratina lemmonii, called the Lemmon's snakeroot, is a North American species of plants in the family Asteraceae. It is found only in the southwestern United States in the states of Arizona and New Mexico, as well as the states of Sonora, Sinaloa, Chihuahua and Durango in Mexico.

== Etymology ==
Ageratina is derived from Greek meaning 'un-aging', in reference to the flowers keeping their color for a long time. This name was used by Dioscorides for a number of different plants.

The species is named for John Gill Lemmon (1831–1908), husband of botanist Sara Plummer Lemmon (1836–1923).
