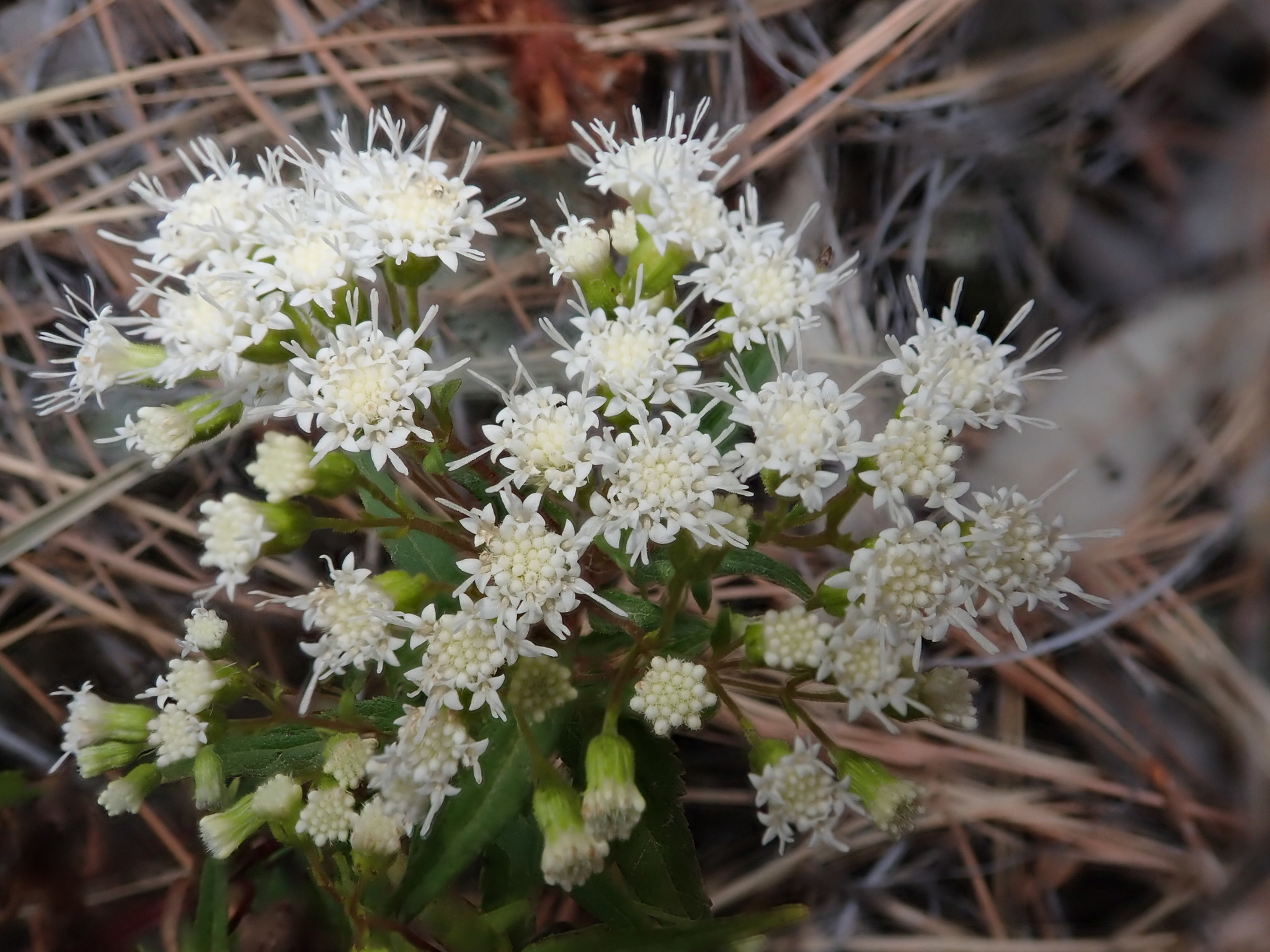

Scientific classification
- Kingdom: Plantae
- Clade: Tracheophytes
- Clade: Angiosperms
- Clade: Eudicots
- Clade: Asterids
- Order: Asterales
- Family: Asteraceae
- Genus: Ageratina
- Species: A. paupercula

Binomial name
- Ageratina paupercula (A.Gray) R.M.King & H.Rob.

Synonyms
- Eupatorium pauperculum A.Gray; Kyrstenia paupercula (A.Gray) Greene; Piptothrix arizonica Nelson

= Ageratina paupercula =

Species of flowering plant

Ageratina paupercula, called the Santa Rita snakeroot, is a North American species of shrubs or perennial herbs in the family Asteraceae. It is found only in the states of Arizona, Sonora, Chihuahua, Durango, Nayarit, and Jalisco.

== Etymology ==
Ageratina is derived from Greek meaning 'un-aging', in reference to the flowers keeping their color for a long time. This name was used by Dioscorides for a number of different plants.

The epithet paupercula is feminine of pauperculus, Latin for "poor".

The "Santa Rita" part of the common name refers to the Santa Rita Mountains in southern Arizona, south of Tucson, where the species was initially discovered.
