= Ageratina sodiroi =

Conservation status
- Least Concern (IUCN 3.1)

Scientific classification
- Kingdom: Plantae
- Clade: Tracheophytes
- Clade: Angiosperms
- Clade: Eudicots
- Clade: Asterids
- Order: Asterales
- Family: Asteraceae
- Genus: Ageratina
- Species: A. sodiroi

Binomial name
- Ageratina sodiroi (Hieron.) R.M.King & H.Rob.

Synonyms
- Eupatorium sodiroi Hieron. in Bot. Jahrb. Syst. 29: 12 (1900)

Species of flowering plant

Ageratina sodiroi is a species of flowering plant in the family Asteraceae. It is endemic to Ecuador, where it is widely distributed in the Andes.

This plant grows as an herb, sub-shrub, or shrub. It grows in forests and upper Andean vegetation types up to 3500 meters in altitude.

== Etymology ==
Ageratina is derived from Greek meaning 'un-aging', in reference to the flowers keeping their color for a long time.

The specific epithet of sodiroi refers to Luis Sodiro (1836–1909), who was an Italian Jesuit priest and a field botanist, who collected many plants in Ecuador.

It was first published in Phytologia vol.19 on page 217 in 1970.
