= Ageratina rhypodes =

Conservation status
- Near Threatened (IUCN 3.1)

Scientific classification
- Kingdom: Plantae
- Clade: Tracheophytes
- Clade: Angiosperms
- Clade: Eudicots
- Clade: Asterids
- Order: Asterales
- Family: Asteraceae
- Genus: Ageratina
- Species: A. rhypodes

Binomial name
- Ageratina rhypodes (B.L.Rob.) R.M.King & H.Rob.

Synonyms
- Ageratina esmeraldae (Cuatrec.) R.M.King & H.Rob.; Eupatorium esmeraldae Cuatrec.; Eupatorium rhypodes B.L.Rob.

Species of flowering plant

Ageratina rhypodes is a species of flowering plant in the family Asteraceae. It is found only in Ecuador. Its natural habitats are subtropical or tropical moist montane forests and subtropical or tropical high-elevation grassland. It is threatened by habitat loss.

== Etymology ==
Ageratina is derived from Greek meaning 'un-aging', in reference to the flowers keeping their color for a long time. This name was used by Dioscorides for a number of different plants.
