= Ageratina concordiana =

Scientific classification
- Kingdom: Plantae
- Clade: Tracheophytes
- Clade: Angiosperms
- Clade: Eudicots
- Clade: Asterids
- Order: Asterales
- Family: Asteraceae
- Genus: Ageratina
- Species: A. concordiana

Binomial name
- Ageratina concordiana B.L.Turner

Species of flowering plant

Ageratina concordiana is a species of flowering shrub in the family Asteraceae, native to the state of Sinaloa in northwestern Mexico.

The plant is similar to Ageratina reserva but with larger, heart-shaped leaves and smaller flowerheads. Ageratina reserva is found further south, in the state of Chiapas. Ageratina concordianais named for the Municipio (district) of Concordia in southern Sinaloa, where the species was initially discovered.

== Etymology ==
Ageratina is derived from Greek meaning 'un-aging', in reference to the flowers keeping their color for a long time. This name was used by Dioscorides for a number of different plants.
