= Ageratina roanensis =

- Ageratina roanensis in bloom

Conservation status
- Vulnerable (NatureServe)

Scientific classification
- Kingdom: Plantae
- Clade: Tracheophytes
- Clade: Angiosperms
- Clade: Eudicots
- Clade: Asterids
- Order: Asterales
- Family: Asteraceae
- Genus: Ageratina
- Species: A. roanensis

Binomial name
- Ageratina roanensis (Small) E.E. Lamont

Synonyms
- Ageratina altissima var. roanensis (Small) Clewell & Wooten; Eupatorium roanense Small; Eupatorium roanensis Small; Eupatorium rugosum var. roanense (Small) Fernald

Species of flowering plant

Ageratina roanensis, also known as the Appalachian white snakeroot or Appalachian milk-poison, is a poisonous species of perennial herb in the sunflower family (Asteraceae). It is endemic to moderate to high elevation habitats along the Southern Appalachian Mountains of Tennessee, North Carolina, Virginia, Kentucky, and South Carolina.

== Description ==
The species grows to about 2 to 2.5 feet tall and flowers from July through October.

It can be distinguished from related members in the genus by its combination of longer phyllaries (5-7mm), inflorescences in dense corymbs, and its moderate to high elevation forest habitat.

== Taxonomy & taxonomic history ==
The specific epithet "roanensis" refers to Roan Mountain, from which the type specimen was collected.

The species was originally described in 1933 by John Kunkel Small under the name Eupatorium roanensis.

E. roanensis was reduced to varietal rank under Eupatorium rugosum (E. rugosum var. roanense) in 1942. It was transferred to the genus Ageratina under the name Ageratina altissima var. roanensis in 1971.

A 2018 publication raised A. altissima var. roanensis to species rank (A. roanensis), citing consistent morphological differences and restriction to higher elevation habitats in the Southern Appalachian Mountains.

== Conservation ==
NatureServe ranks Ageratina altissima var. roanensis (outdated synonym of Ageratina roanensis) as globally vulnerable (G5T3T4). It is ranked S2 (Imperiled) in Tennessee.
