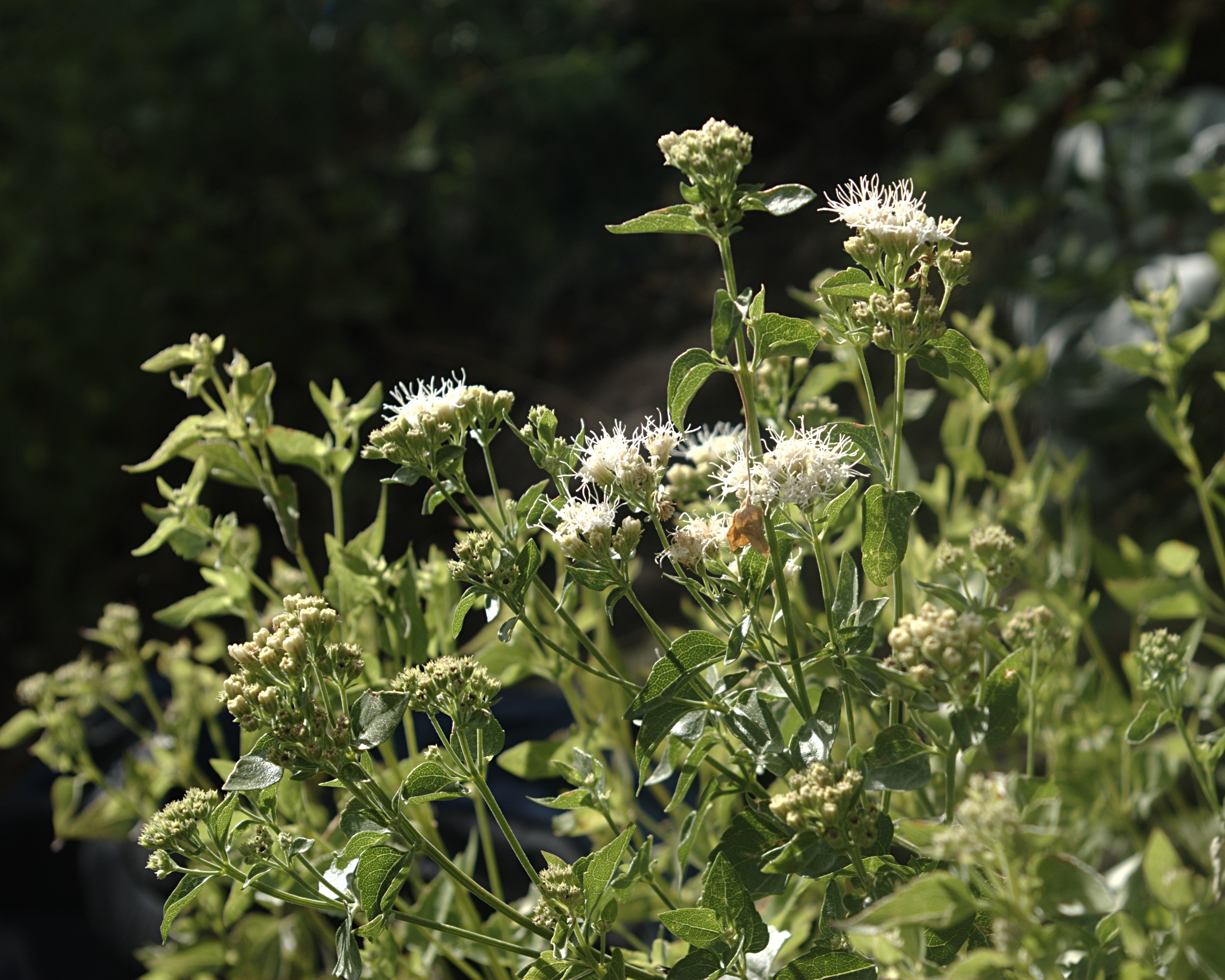

Conservation status
- Secure (NatureServe)

Scientific classification
- Kingdom: Plantae
- Clade: Tracheophytes
- Clade: Angiosperms
- Clade: Eudicots
- Clade: Asterids
- Order: Asterales
- Family: Asteraceae
- Genus: Ageratina
- Species: A. herbacea

Binomial name
- Ageratina herbacea (A.Gray) King & H.Rob.

Synonyms
- Synonymy: Eupatorium ageratifolium var. herbaceum A.Gray; Eupatorium arizonicum (A.Gray) Greene; Eupatorium arizonicum (A.Gray) A.Nelson; Eupatorium betulifolium (Greene) B.L.Rob.; Eupatorium herbaceum (A.Gray) Greene; Eupatorium occidentale var. arizonicum A.Gray; Kyrstenia arizonica (A.Gray) Greene; Kyrstenia betulifolia Greene; Kyrstenia herbacea (A.Gray) Greene

= Ageratina herbacea =

Species of flowering plant

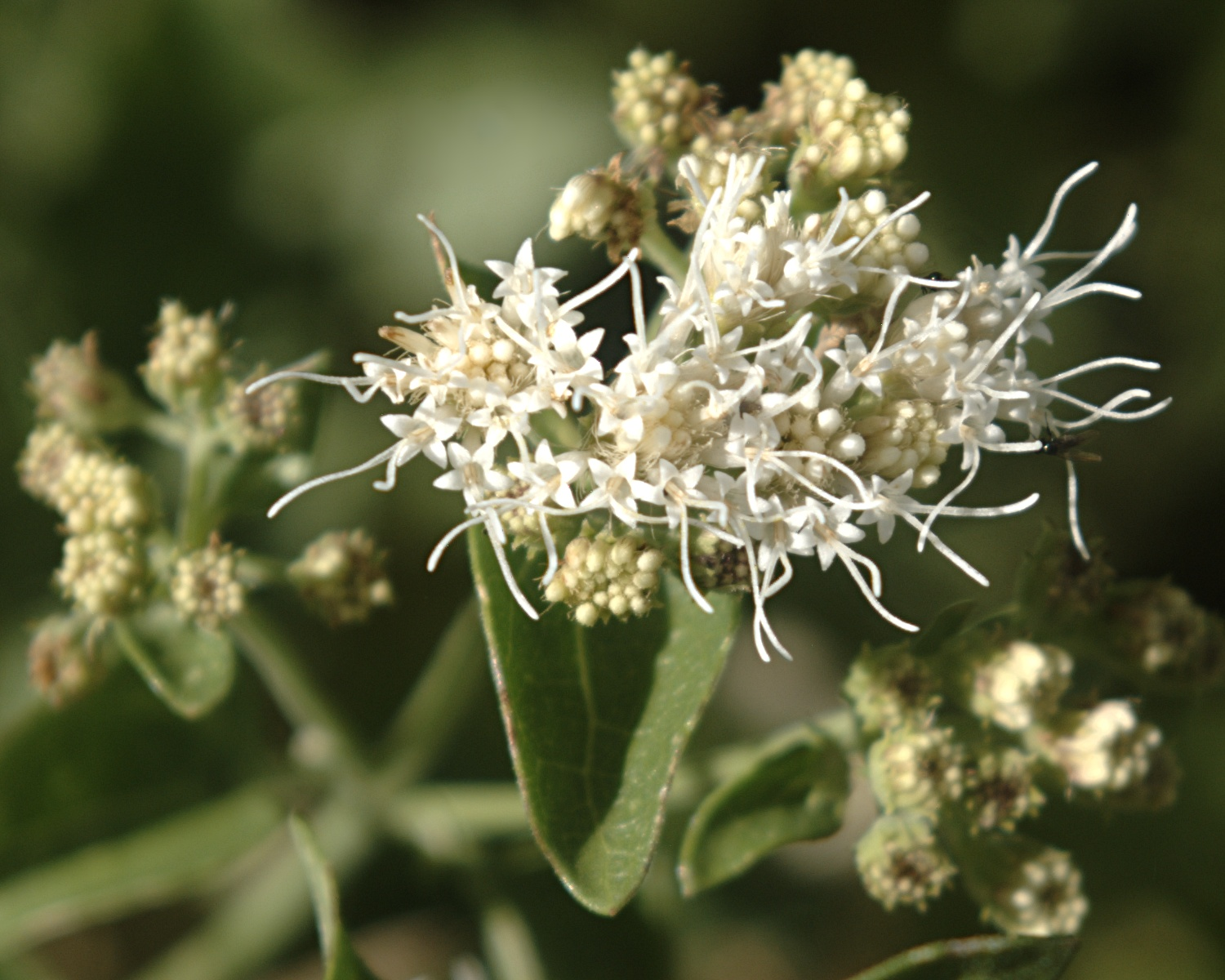
Flower detail

Ageratina herbacea is a North American species of flowering plants in the family Asteraceae known by the common names fragrant snakeroot and Apache snakeroot. It is native to desert regions (Sonoran, Mojave, and Chihuahuan Deserts) of the southwestern United States (southeastern California, southern Nevada, southern Utah, Colorado, Arizona, New Mexico, western Texas) and northern Mexico (Baja California, Chihuahua, Coahuila, Sonora). It grows in rocky slopes in conifer forests and woodlands.

Ageratina herbacea is a perennial herb growing a green, fuzzy stem from a woody caudex to heights between about 50 and 70 centimeters. The leaves are yellow to green or grayish and are triangular to heart-shaped. The inflorescence is a cluster of fuzzy flower heads under a centimeter long containing long, protruding white disc florets and no ray florets. The fruit is an achene a few millimeters long with a rough bristly pappus.

== Etymology ==
Ageratina is derived from Greek meaning 'un-aging', in reference to the flowers keeping their color for a long time. This name was used by Dioscorides for a number of different plants.
