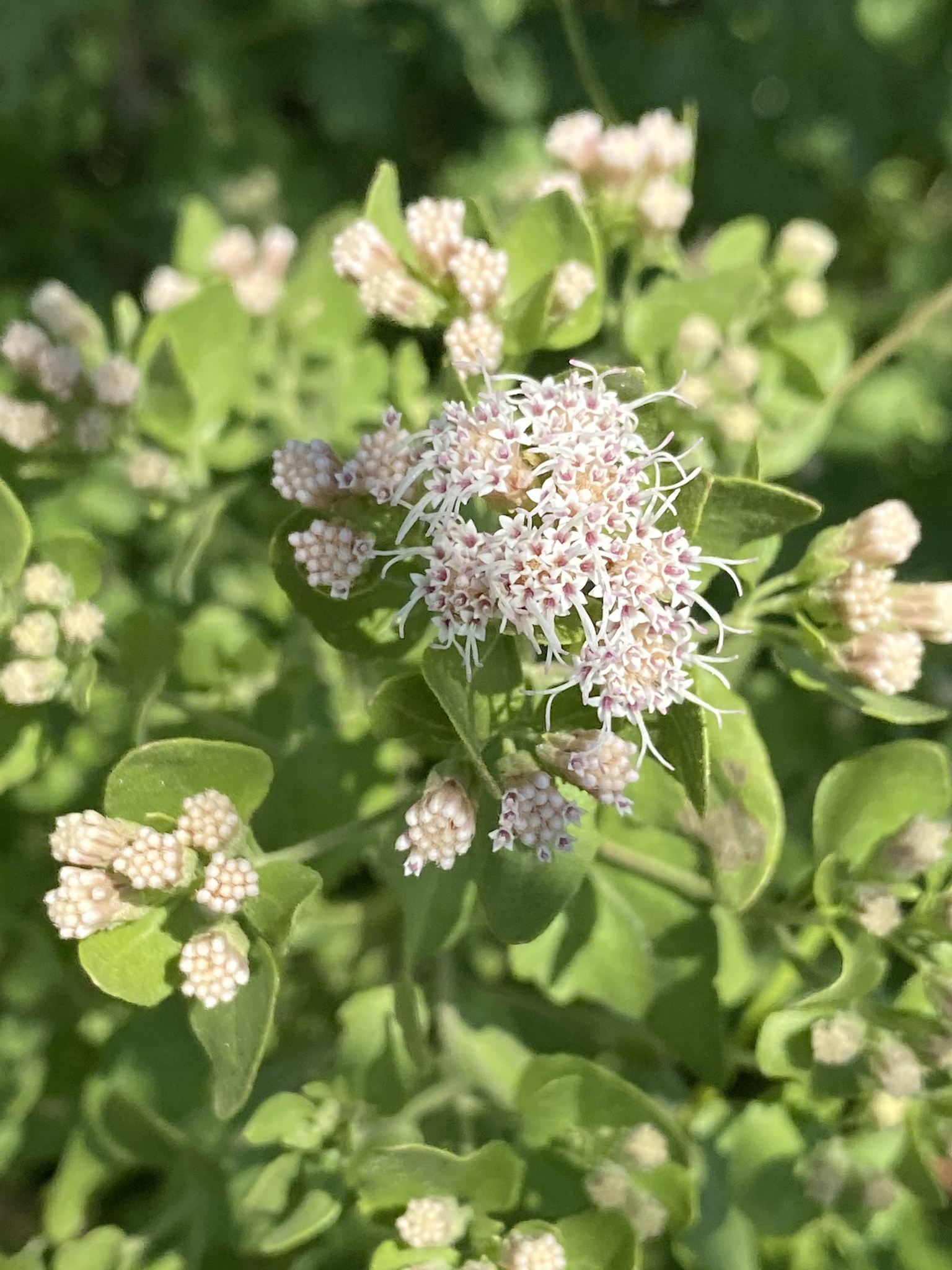

Conservation status
- Secure (NatureServe)

Scientific classification
- Kingdom: Plantae
- Clade: Tracheophytes
- Clade: Angiosperms
- Clade: Eudicots
- Clade: Asterids
- Order: Asterales
- Family: Asteraceae
- Genus: Ageratina
- Species: A. wrightii

Binomial name
- Ageratina wrightii (A.Gray) R.M.King & H.Rob.

Synonyms
- Eupatorium wrightii A.Gray (basionym); Kyrstenia parvifolia Greene

= Ageratina wrightii =

Species of flowering plant

Ageratina wrightii (Wright's snakeroot) is a North American species of plants in the family Asteraceae. It is native to the southwestern United States (New Mexico, southern Arizona, western Texas) and northern Mexico (Tamaulipas, Nuevo León, Coahuila, Chihuahua, San Luis Potosí, Durango, Zacatecas, Aguascalientes, Jalisco).

== Etymology ==
Ageratina is derived from Greek meaning 'un-aging', in reference to the flowers keeping their color for a long time. This name was used by Dioscorides for a number of different plants.

The plant is named for American botanist Charles Wright (1811-1885).
