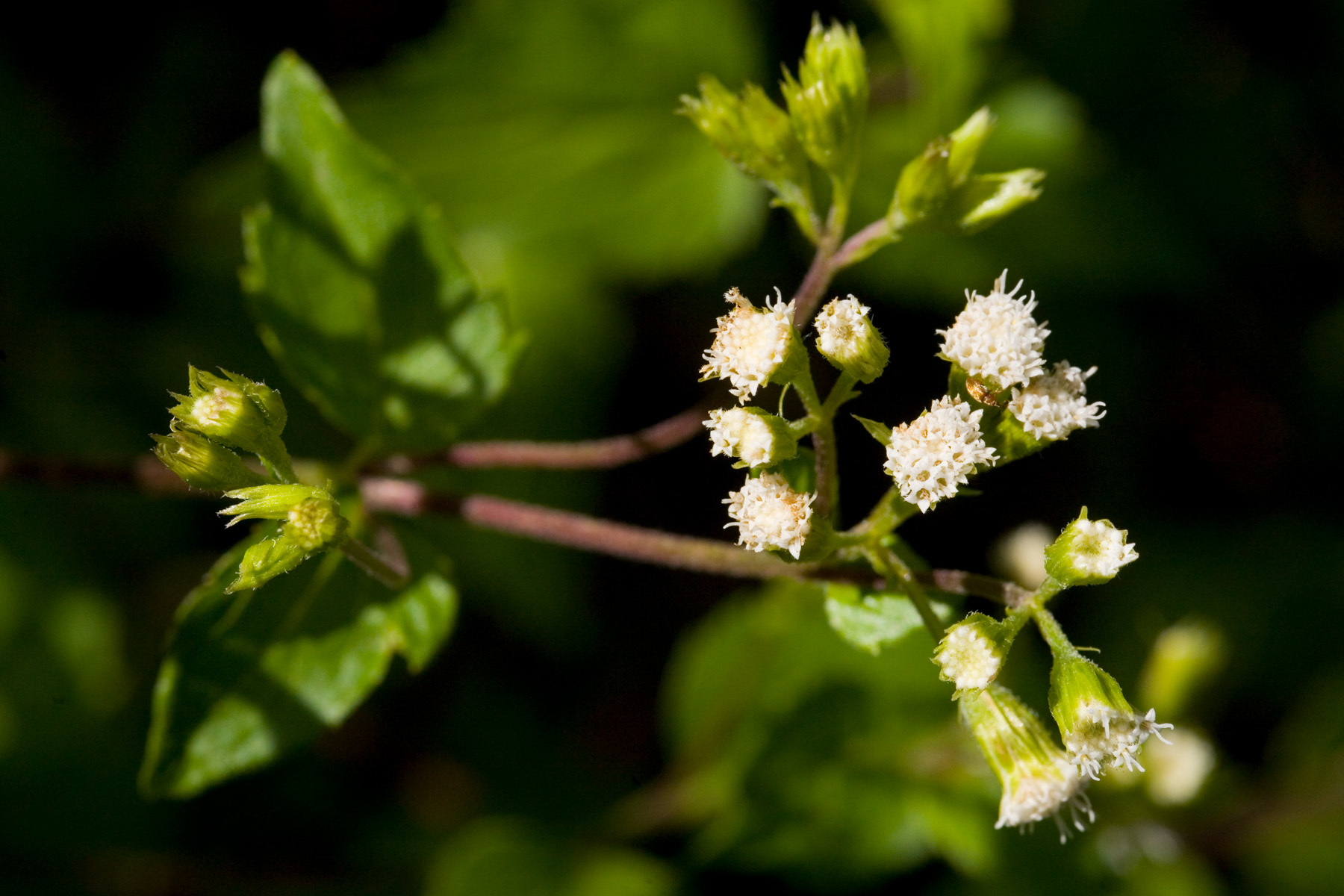

Conservation status
- Apparently Secure (NatureServe)

Scientific classification
- Kingdom: Plantae
- Clade: Tracheophytes
- Clade: Angiosperms
- Clade: Eudicots
- Clade: Asterids
- Order: Asterales
- Family: Asteraceae
- Genus: Ageratina
- Species: A. rothrockii

Binomial name
- Ageratina rothrockii (A.Gray) R.M.King & H.Rob.

Synonyms
- Eupatorium rothrockii A.Gray; Kyrstenia rothrockii (A.Gray) Greene

= Ageratina rothrockii =

Species of flowering plant

Ageratina rothrockii (Rothrock's snakeroot) is a North American species of plants in the family Asteraceae. It is found only in the southwestern United States in the states of Arizona, New Mexico, and Texas, as well as the states of Sonora, Coahuila, Chihuahua, and Durango in Mexico.

== Etymology ==
Ageratina is derived from Greek meaning 'un-aging', in reference to the flowers keeping their color for a long time. This name was used by Dioscorides for a number of different plants.

The species is named for American botanist and forester Joseph Rothrock, 1839–1922.
