= Ageratina thyrsiflora =

Scientific classification
- Kingdom: Plantae
- Clade: Tracheophytes
- Clade: Angiosperms
- Clade: Eudicots
- Clade: Asterids
- Order: Asterales
- Family: Asteraceae
- Genus: Ageratina
- Species: A. thyrsiflora

Binomial name
- Ageratina thyrsiflora (Greene) R.M.King & H.Rob.

Synonyms
- Eupatorium thyrsiflorum (Greene) B.L.Rob.; Kyrstenia thyrsiflora Greene

Species of flowering plant

Ageratina thyrsiflora is a North American species of plants in the family Asteraceae. It is native mostly to northwestern Mexico (states of Chihuahua, Durango, Jalisco, Sinaloa, and Sonora). The range extends just barely into the United States, a single herbarium specimen having been collected in 1929 just north of the border town of Nogales, Arizona.

== Etymology ==
Ageratina is derived from Greek meaning 'un-aging', in reference to the flowers keeping their color for a long time. This name was used by Dioscorides for a number of different plants. Thyrsiflora is derived from the Ancient Greek thyrsos (θύρσος; meaning a 'contracted panicle, wreath, or thyrsos') and the Latin floris (gen. 'flower'), and so, thyrsiflora means approximately 'with flowers arranged in the shape of a contracted panicle or thyrsos staff'.
