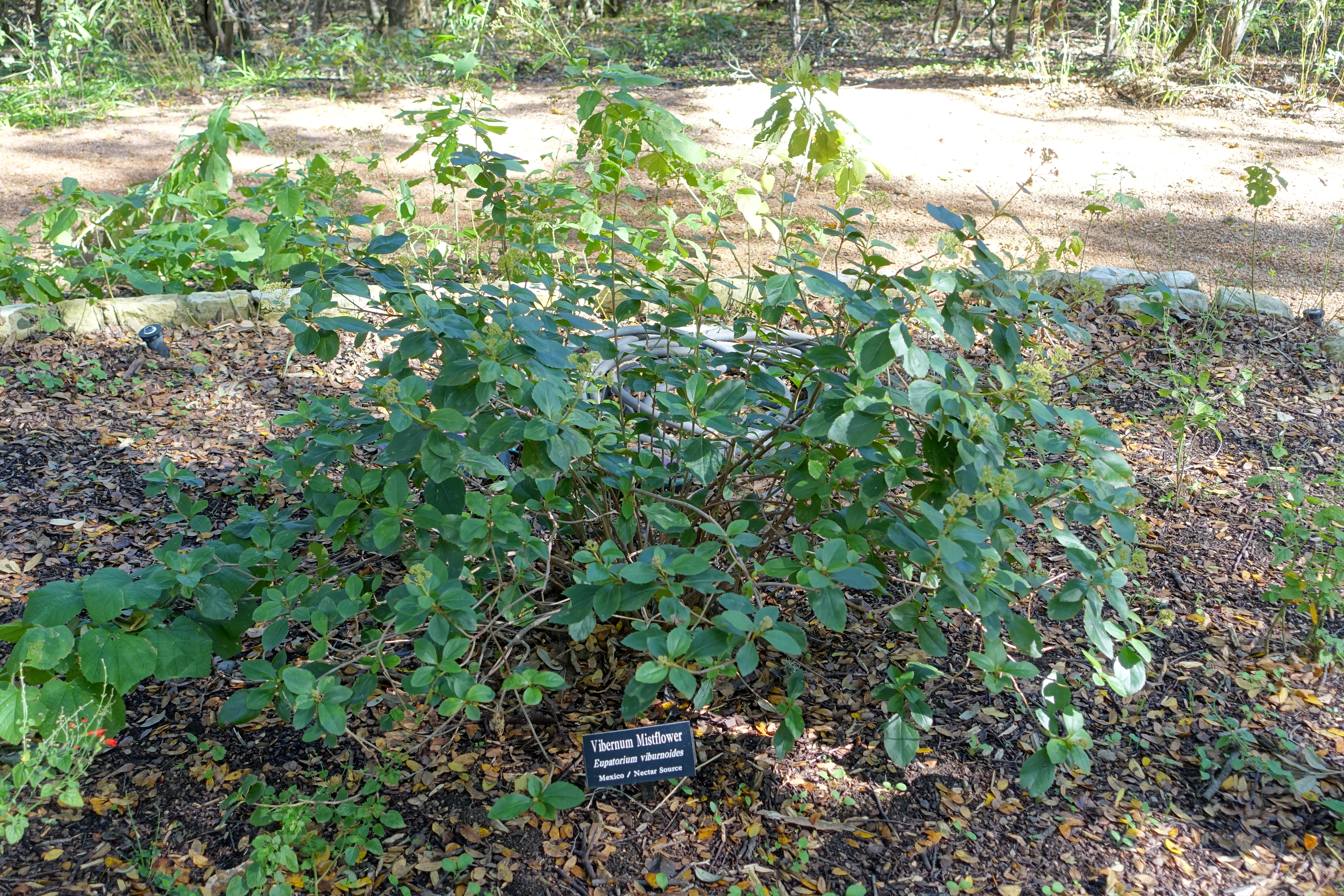

Scientific classification
- Kingdom: Plantae
- Clade: Tracheophytes
- Clade: Angiosperms
- Clade: Eudicots
- Clade: Asterids
- Order: Asterales
- Family: Asteraceae
- Genus: Ageratina
- Species: A. viburnoides

Binomial name
- Ageratina viburnoides (DC.) R.M.King & H.Rob.

Synonyms
- Eupatorium viburnoides DC. (basionym)

= Ageratina viburnoides =

Species of flowering plant

Ageratina viburnoides is a species of plant in the family Asteraceae.

== Etymology ==
Ageratina is derived from Greek meaning 'un-aging', in reference to the flowers keeping their color for a long time. This name was used by Dioscorides for a number of different plants.
