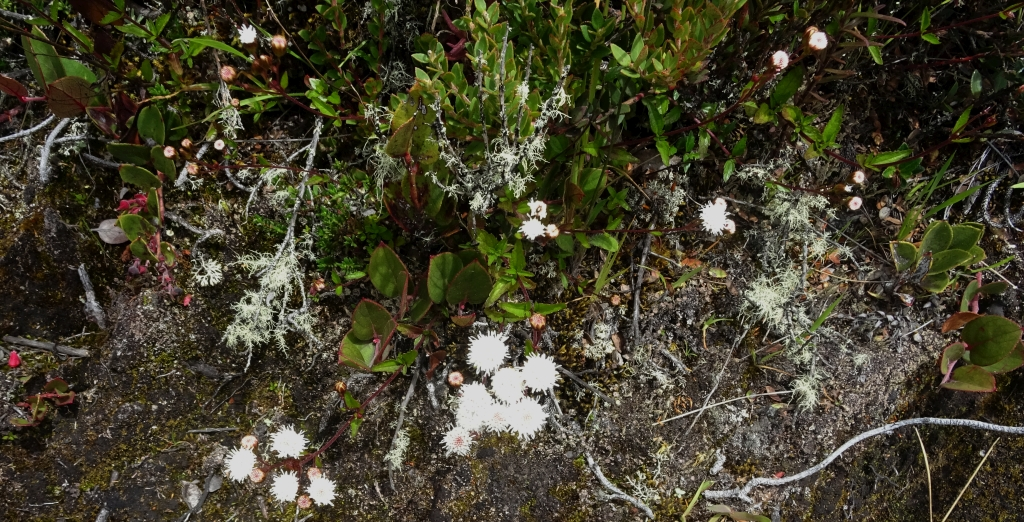
- Ageratina tinifolia at Ocetá Páramo, Colombia

Scientific classification
- Kingdom: Plantae
- Clade: Tracheophytes
- Clade: Angiosperms
- Clade: Eudicots
- Clade: Asterids
- Order: Asterales
- Family: Asteraceae
- Genus: Ageratina
- Species: A. tinifolia

Binomial name
- Ageratina tinifolia (Kunth) R.M. King & H. Rob

Synonyms
- Eupatorium lehmannianum Klatt 1886; Eupatorium tinifolium Kunth 1818

= Ageratina tinifolia =

Species of flowering plant

Ageratina tinifolia is a species of flowering plant in the family Asteraceae. It is found in the Andes from southern Colombia (departments of Antioquia, Boyacá, Caldas, Cauca, Cesar, Cundinamarca, Huila, Meta, Nariño, Norte de Santander, Putumayo, Quindío, Risaralda, Santander and Tolima) to Venezuela, where it typically occurs in the transition zone of high Andean forests and páramo vegetation.

== Etymology ==
The species epithet is derived from the Greek τεινο, "wide", referring to the shape of the flowers. In the publication about the Royal Botanical Expedition to New Granada, headed by Spanish botanist and priest José Celestino Mutis, the Spanish name is registered as "pegajosa". Other reported names for the plant include "amargoso" in Sumapaz, "ayubara" in the Páramo de las Papas, Cauca, "chilco" in El Cocuy, Boyacá, La Calera, Cundinamarca and Angostura, Antioquia and "chilco amargo" in Soacha, Cundinamarca.

== Description ==
The species was first described as part of the genus Ageratina in 1970 by King and Rob. Earlier reports include Von Humboldt and Bonpland as "grows in New Granada" and by German botanists as Eupatorium tinifolium by Carl Sigismund Kunth in 1818 and Eupatorium lehmannianum by Friedrich Wilhelm Klatt in 1886.

== Distribution ==
It occurs in the Andean region in high Andean forest biomes at altitudes ranging from 2,500 to 3,700 metres (8,200 to 12,100 ft) and on páramos, such as at altitudes of 3,000 to 3,100 metres (9,800 to 10,200 ft) in La Chorrera, Une, Cundinamarca. The plant is a typical species at the transition of the two biomes. To the north on the Altiplano Cundiboyacense in the Cárpatos forest reserve of Guasca, Cundinamarca, the plant is one of the most abundant in the higher elevation areas, dominated by Weinmannia pinnata and Miconia theaezans. Ageratina tinifolia is the most dominant species in the northeastern part of the Llano de Paletará, Coconuco, Cauca. The plant is also abundant in the El Volcán forest reserve of Pamplona, Norte de Santander.
