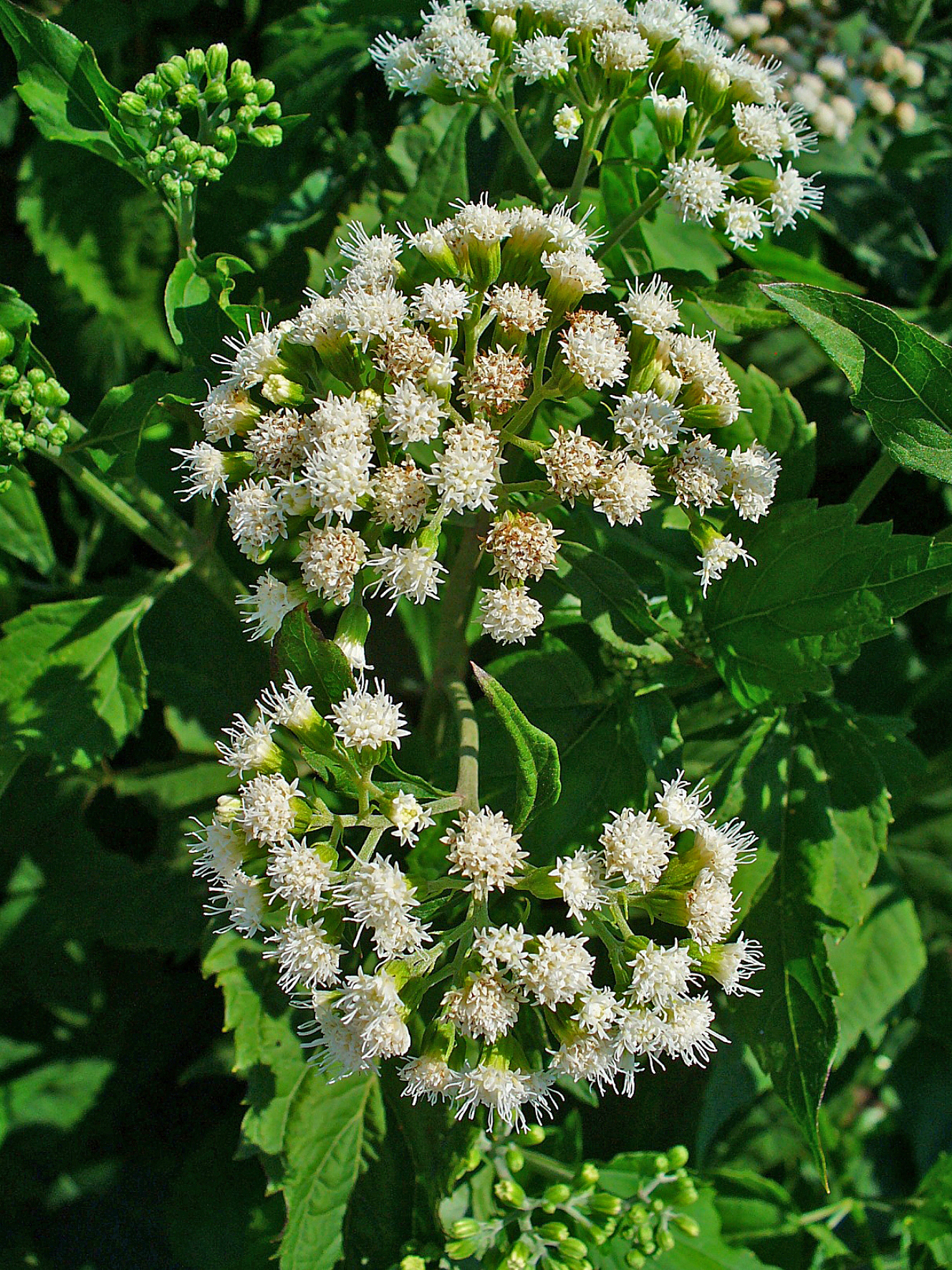

Conservation status
- Secure (NatureServe)

Scientific classification
- Kingdom: Plantae
- Clade: Tracheophytes
- Clade: Angiosperms
- Clade: Eudicots
- Clade: Asterids
- Order: Asterales
- Family: Asteraceae
- Genus: Ageratina
- Species: A. aromatica

Binomial name
- Ageratina aromatica (L.) Spach

Synonyms
- Synonymy: Ageratina cordata (Walter) Spach; Eupatorium aromaticum L.; Eupatorium ceanothifolium Muhl. ex Willd.; Eupatorium cordatum Walter 1788 not Burm.f. 1768 nor Mutis 1958; Eupatorium cordiforme Poir.; Eupatorium engelmannianum Link ex Torr. & A.Gray; Eupatorium latidens Small; Eupatorium melissoides Willd.; Eupatorium nemorale Greene; Eupatorium tracyi Greene; Eupatorium viburnifolium Greene; Kyrstenia aromatica (L.) Greene; Kyrstenia ceanothifolia (Muhlenb.Willd.) Greene; Kyrstenia melissoides (Willd.) Greene; Kyrstenia nemoralis (Greene) Greene; Kyrstenia tracyi (Greene) Greene; Kyrstenia viburnifolia (Greene) Greene

= Ageratina aromatica =

Species of flowering plant

Ageratina aromatica, also known as lesser snakeroot and small-leaved white snakeroot, is a North American species of plants in the family Asteraceae. It is widespread and common across much of the eastern and southern United States from Louisiana to Massachusetts, as far inland as Kentucky and Ohio.

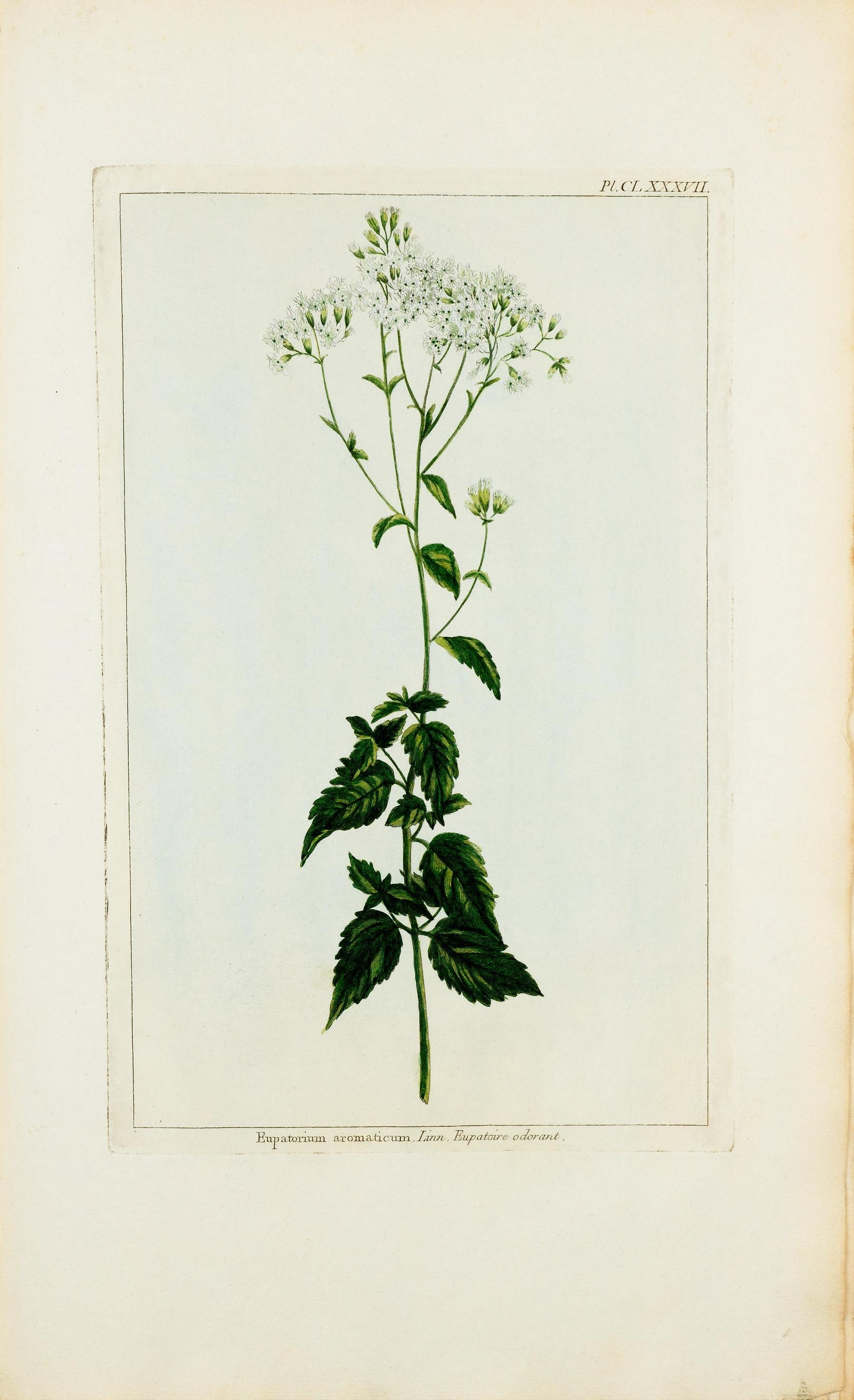
Illustration of plant.

== Etymology ==
Ageratina is derived from Greek meaning 'un-aging', in reference to the flowers keeping their color for a long time. This name was used by Dioscorides for a number of different plants.

== Ecology ==
The lesser snakeroot lives in woodlands as a perennial in early successional gap habitats created by fires or fallen trees. It is often found near rocky outcroppings.

Ageratina aromatica is insect pollinated and is recorded to have been visited in northern Florida by the bee species Agapostemon splendens, Augochloropsis metallica, Augochloropsis sumptuosa, Bombus bimaculatus, Hylaeus floridanus, and Lasioglossum apopkense.

== Conservation ==
A. aromatica is listed as endangered in New York.

== Taxonomy ==
A variety incisum from Florida and Virginia has been described.
