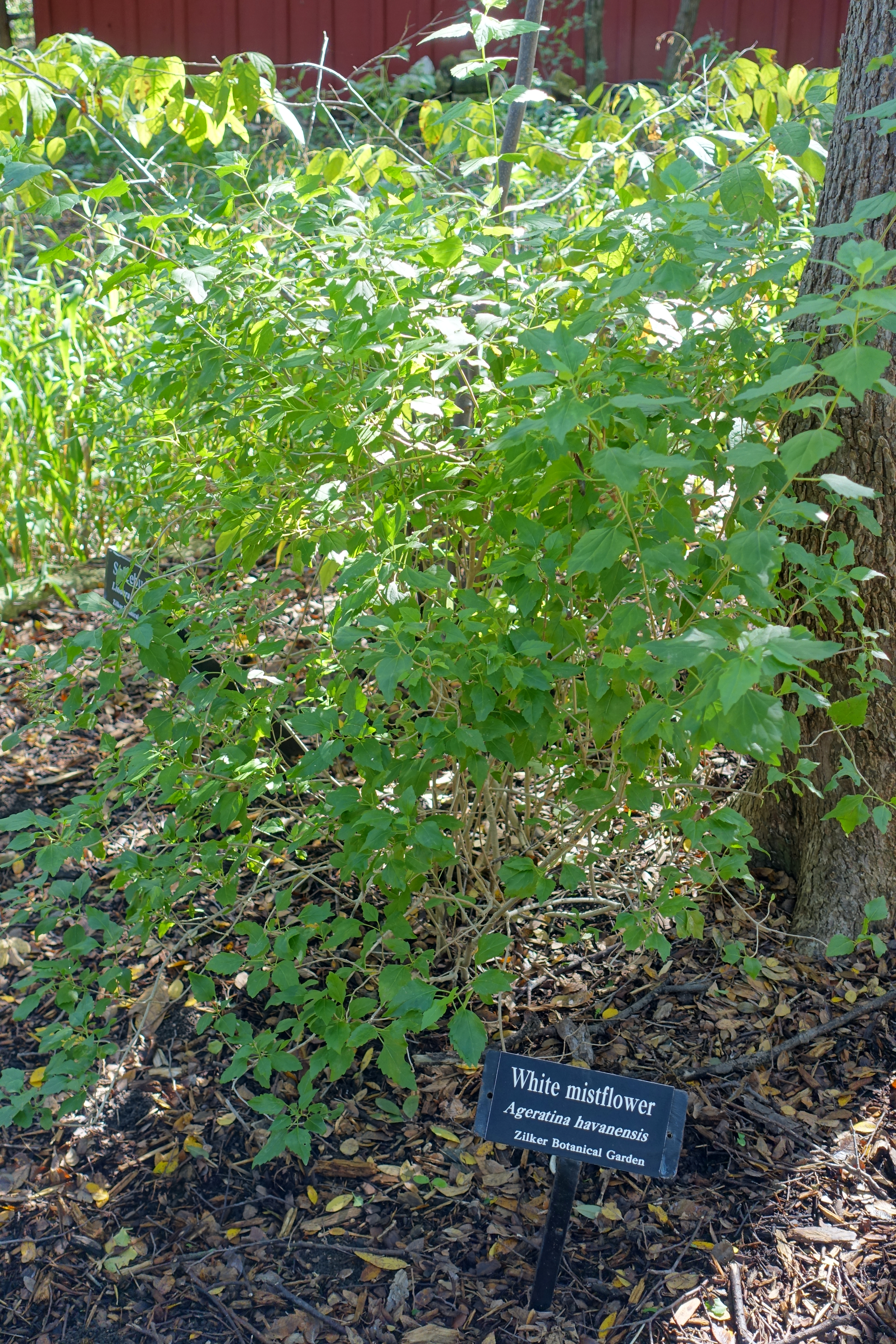

Conservation status
- Least Concern (IUCN 3.1)

Scientific classification
- Kingdom: Plantae
- Clade: Tracheophytes
- Clade: Angiosperms
- Clade: Eudicots
- Clade: Asterids
- Order: Asterales
- Family: Asteraceae
- Genus: Ageratina
- Species: A. havanensis

Binomial name
- Ageratina havanensis (Kunth) R.M King & H.Rob.

Synonyms
- Synonymy: Bulbostylis deltoides Buckley; Eupatorium ageratifolium DC.; Eupatorium ageratoides Bertero ex DC. 1836 not L.f. 1782; Eupatorium berlandieri DC.; Eupatorium havanense Kunth; Eupatorium leiophyllum Less.; Eupatorium lindheimerianum Scheele; Eupatorium papantlense Less.; Eupatorium texense (Torr. & A.Gray) Rydb.; Kyrstenia ageratifolia (DC.) Greene; Mikania deltoides Poepp. ex Spreng.

= Ageratina havanensis =

Species of flowering plant

Ageratina havanensis, the Havana snakeroot or white mistflower, is a species of flowering shrub in the family Asteraceae, native to the south-western United States (Texas), Cuba, and north-eastern and east-central Mexico (Veracruz, Tamaulipas, Coahuila, Nuevo León, Hidalgo, San Luis Potosí, Puebla, Guanajuato, Querétaro). Unlike many other species of Ageratina, it is evergreen.

== Etymology ==
Ageratina is derived from Greek meaning 'un-aging', in reference to the flowers keeping their color for a long time. This name was used by Dioscorides for a number of different plants.
