= Ageratina cuencana =

Conservation status
- Vulnerable (IUCN 3.1)

Scientific classification
- Kingdom: Plantae
- Clade: Tracheophytes
- Clade: Angiosperms
- Clade: Eudicots
- Clade: Asterids
- Order: Asterales
- Family: Asteraceae
- Genus: Ageratina
- Species: A. cuencana

Binomial name
- Ageratina cuencana (B.L.Rob.) R.M.King & H.Rob.

Synonyms
- Eupatorium cuencanum B.L.Rob.

Species of flowering plant

Ageratina cuencana is a species of flowering plant in the family Asteraceae. It is endemic to Ecuador. Its natural habitats are subtropical or tropical moist montane forests and subtropical or tropical high-altitude shrubland. It is threatened by habitat loss.

== Etymology ==
Ageratina is derived from Greek meaning "un-aging", in reference to the flowers keeping their color for a long time. This name was used by Dioscorides for a number of different plants.
