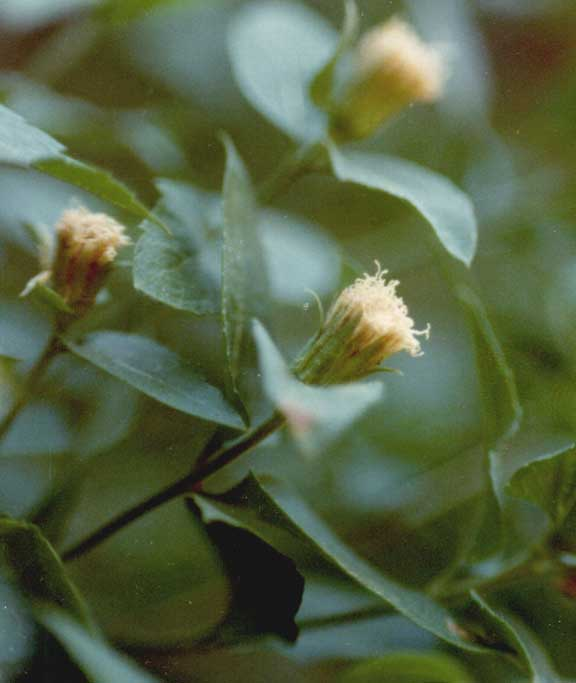

Conservation status
- Vulnerable (NatureServe)

Scientific classification
- Kingdom: Plantae
- Clade: Tracheophytes
- Clade: Angiosperms
- Clade: Eudicots
- Clade: Asterids
- Order: Asterales
- Family: Asteraceae
- Genus: Ageratina
- Species: A. shastensis

Binomial name
- Ageratina shastensis (Taylor & Stebbins) R. M. King & H. Rob.

Synonyms
- Eupatorium shastensis Taylor & Stebbins

= Ageratina shastensis =

Species of flowering plant

Ageratina shastensis is a species of snakeroot which is endemic to Shasta County, California. It is known by the common names Mt. Shasta snakeroot and Shasta eupatorium.

== Description ==
Ageratina shastensis is a woody perennial which bears unassuming fluffy white flowers about a centimeter wide. It is an uncommon plant which grows in the cracks of limestone cliffs of the Mount Shasta, part of the Cascade Range.

== Etymology ==
Ageratina is derived from Greek meaning 'un-aging', in reference to the flowers keeping their color for a long time. This name was used by Dioscorides for a number of different plants.
