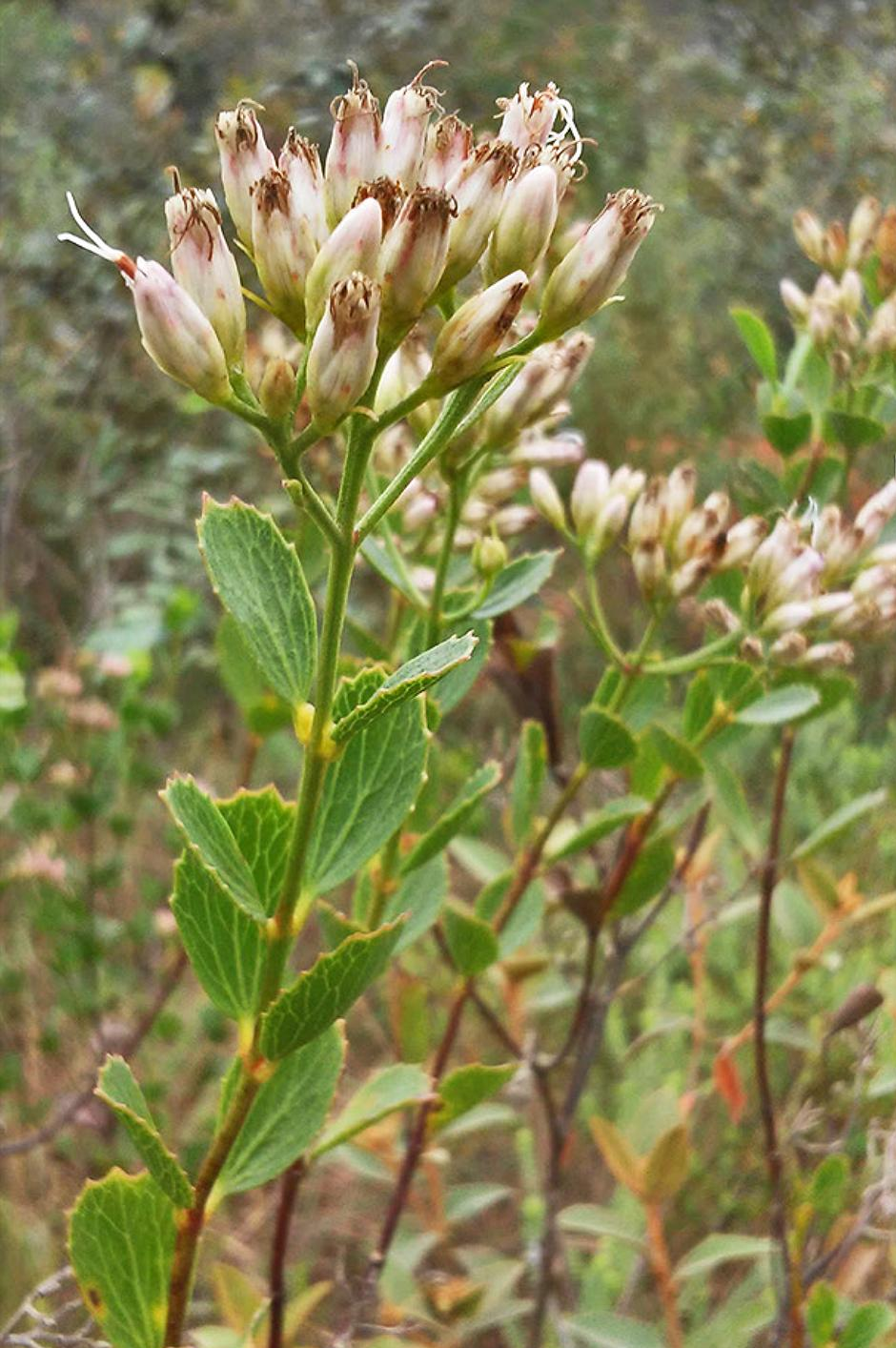
- Symphyopappus decussatus

Scientific classification
- Kingdom: Plantae
- Clade: Tracheophytes
- Clade: Angiosperms
- Clade: Eudicots
- Clade: Asterids
- Order: Asterales
- Family: Asteraceae
- Subfamily: Asteroideae
- Tribe: Eupatorieae
- Genus: Symphyopappus; Turcz.

Type species
- Symphyopappus decussatus Turcz.

Synonyms
- Eupatorium sect. Symphyopappus (Turcz.) Cabrera

= Symphyopappus =

Genus of plants

Symphyopappus is a genus of South American plants in the tribe Eupatorieae within the family Asteraceae.

Species

- Symphyopappus angustifolius Cabrera - Minas Gerais, Bahia
- Symphyopappus apurimacensis H.Rob. - Apurímac
- Symphyopappus brasiliensis (Gardner) R.M.King & H.Rob. - Minas Gerais
- Symphyopappus casarettoi B.L.Rob. - Paraná, Rio Grande do Sul, Santa Catarina
- Symphyopappus compressus (Gardner) B.L.Rob. - Bahia, Paraná, Rio Grande do Sul, Santa Catarina, D.F., São Paulo, Minas Gerais, Goiás
- Symphyopappus cuneatus (DC.) Sch.Bip. ex Baker - Paraná, Santa Catarina, São Paulo, Minas Gerais, Rio de Janeiro
- Symphyopappus decemflorus H.Rob. - Minas Gerais
- Symphyopappus decussatus Turcz. - Minas Gerais, Bahia
- Symphyopappus itatiayensis (Hieron.) R.M.King & H.Rob. - Paraná, Santa Catarina, São Paulo, Minas Gerais, Rio de Janeiro, D.F.
- Symphyopappus lymansmithii B.L.Rob. - Paraná, Santa Catarina, São Paulo, Rio Grande do Sul, Espírito Santo
- Symphyopappus myricifolius B.L.Rob. - Minas Gerais
- Symphyopappus reitzii (Cabrera) R.M.King & H.Rob. - Santa Catarina
- Symphyopappus reticulatus Baker - Minas Gerais
- Symphyopappus uncinatus H.Rob - Minas Gerais

formerly included

See Goyazianthus Neocabreria Raulinoreitzia

- Symphyopappus catharinensis - Neocabreria catharinensis
- Symphyopappus leptophlebius - Raulinoreitzia leptophlebia
- Symphyopappus pennivenius - Neocabreria pennivenia
- Symphyopappus tetrastichus - Goyazianthus tetrastichus
