= Goyazianthus =

Scientific classification
- Kingdom: Plantae
- Clade: Tracheophytes
- Clade: Angiosperms
- Clade: Eudicots
- Clade: Asterids
- Order: Asterales
- Family: Asteraceae
- Subfamily: Asteroideae
- Tribe: Eupatorieae
- Genus: Goyazianthus; R.M.King & H.Rob
- Species: G. tetrastichus

Binomial name
- Goyazianthus tetrastichus (B.L.Rob.) R.M.King & H.Rob

Synonyms
- Symphyopappus tetrastichus B.L.Rob.; Eupatorium tetrastichum (B.L.Rob.) Steyerm.

Genus of flowering plants

Goyazianthus is a genus of flowering plants in the family Asteraceae.

There is only one known species, Goyazianthus tetrastichus, endemic to Brazil (Goiás and Brazilia Distrito Federal).
