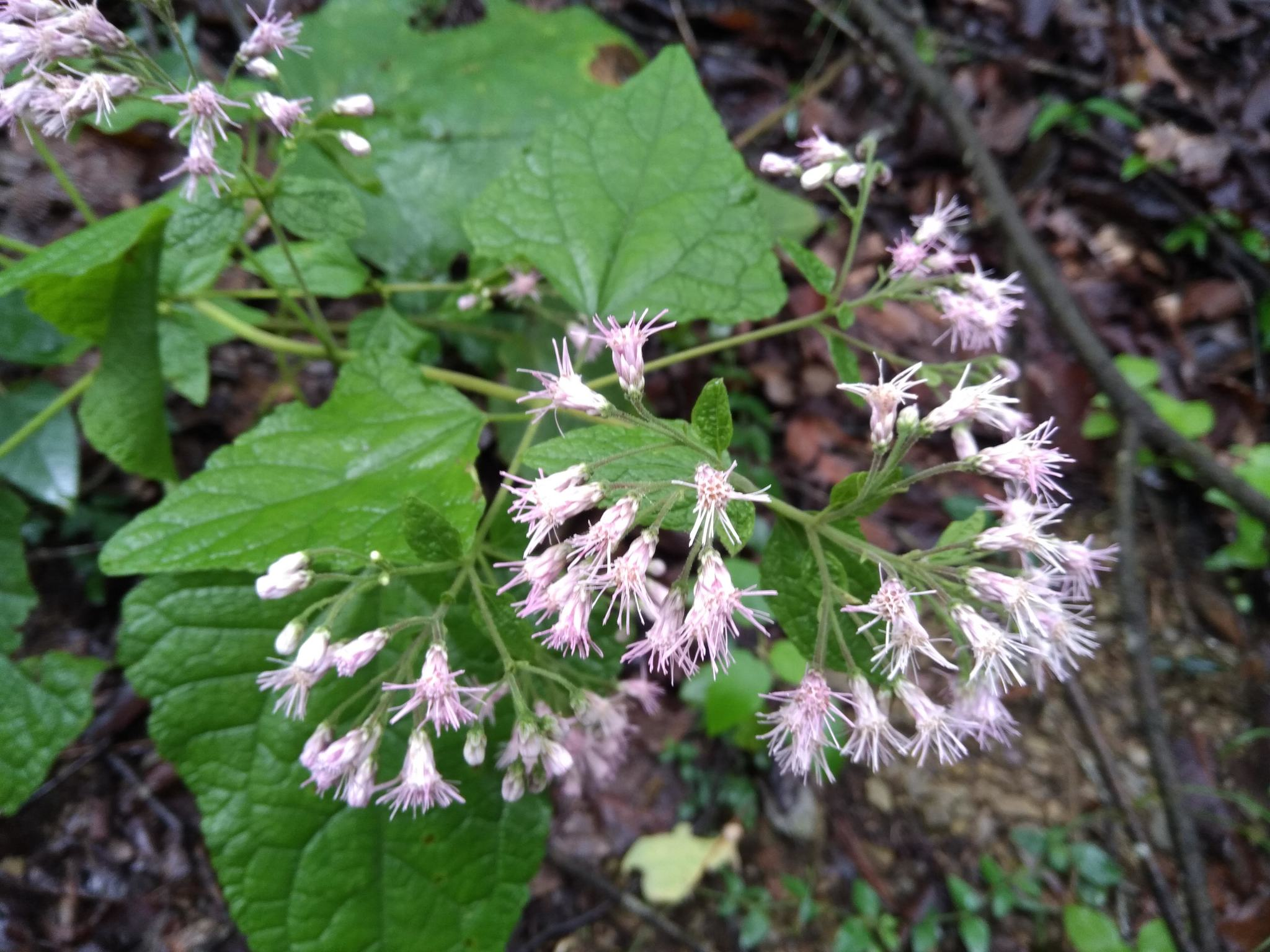
- Peteravenia malvifolia

Scientific classification
- Kingdom: Plantae
- Clade: Tracheophytes
- Clade: Angiosperms
- Clade: Eudicots
- Clade: Asterids
- Order: Asterales
- Family: Asteraceae
- Subfamily: Asteroideae
- Tribe: Eupatorieae
- Genus: Peteravenia; R.M.King & H Rob.

Type species
- Eupatorium schultzii Schnittsp.

= Peteravenia =

Genus of flowering plants

Peteravenia is a genus of Mesoamerican plants in the tribe Eupatorieae within the family Asteraceae.

The genus is named for US botanist Peter H. Raven.

Species

- Peteravenia cyrilli-nelsonii (Ant.Molina) R.M.King & H.Rob. - Honduras
- Peteravenia grisea (J.M.Coult.) R.M.King & H.Rob. - Honduras, Guatemala, Nicaragua description Nash, Flora of Guatemala
- Peteravenia malvifolia (DC.) R.M.King & H.Rob. - Nuevo León, San Luis Potosí
- Peteravenia phoenicolepis (B.L.Rob.) R.M.King & H.Rob. - Guatemala, El Salvador, Honduras, Mexico (Chiapas)
- Peteravenia schultzii (Schnittsp.) R.M.King & H.Rob. - Honduras, Mexico (Chiapas, Oaxaca, Tamaulipas, Veracruz, Querétaro), Guatemala, Nicaragua, El Salvador, Costa Rica,
